= Architecture of Seattle =

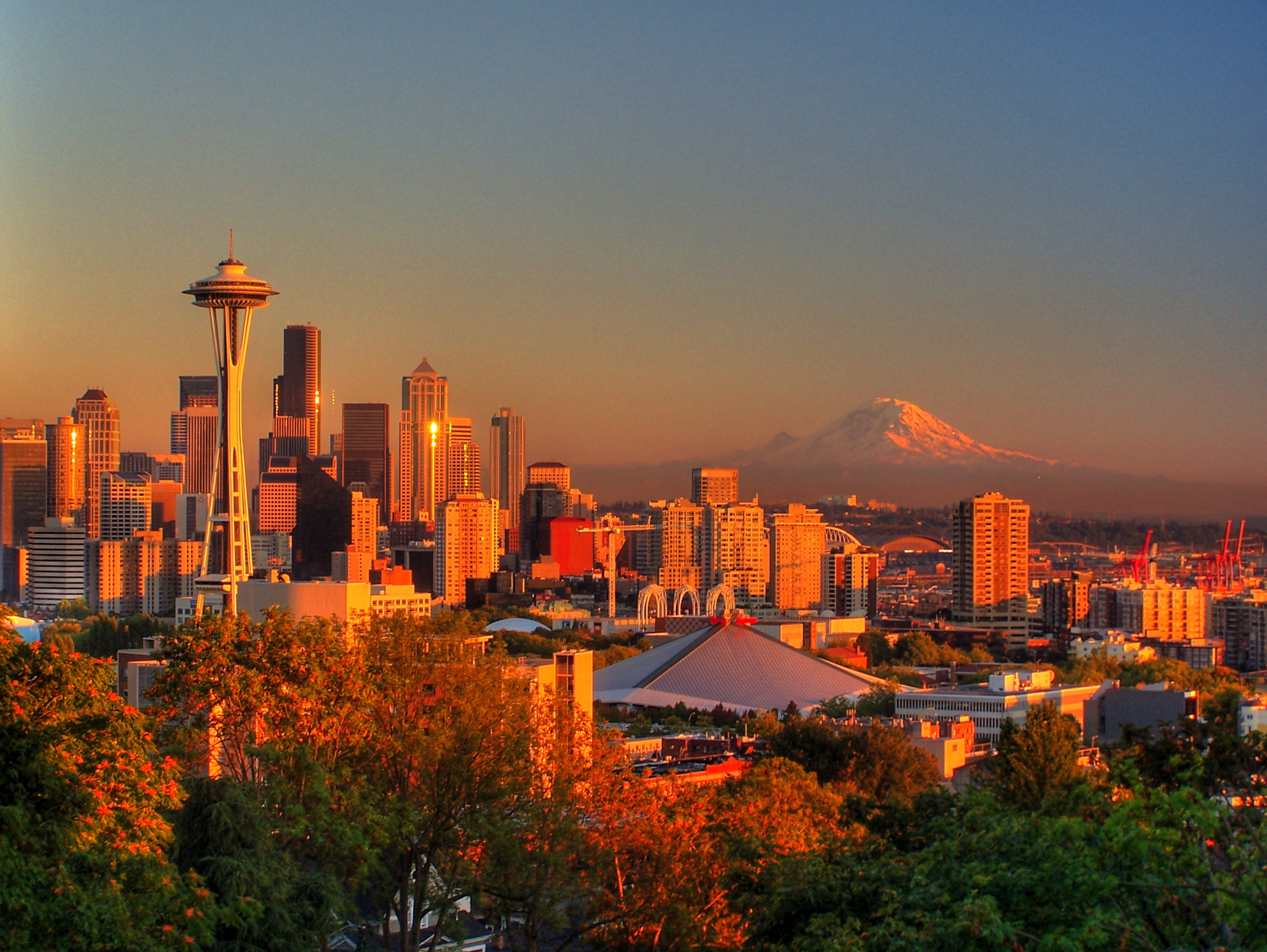
The Space Needle and other Seattle Center buildings built for the 1962 Century 21 Exposition (World's Fair), viewed from Kerry Park at sunset. In the background are Downtown and Mount Rainier

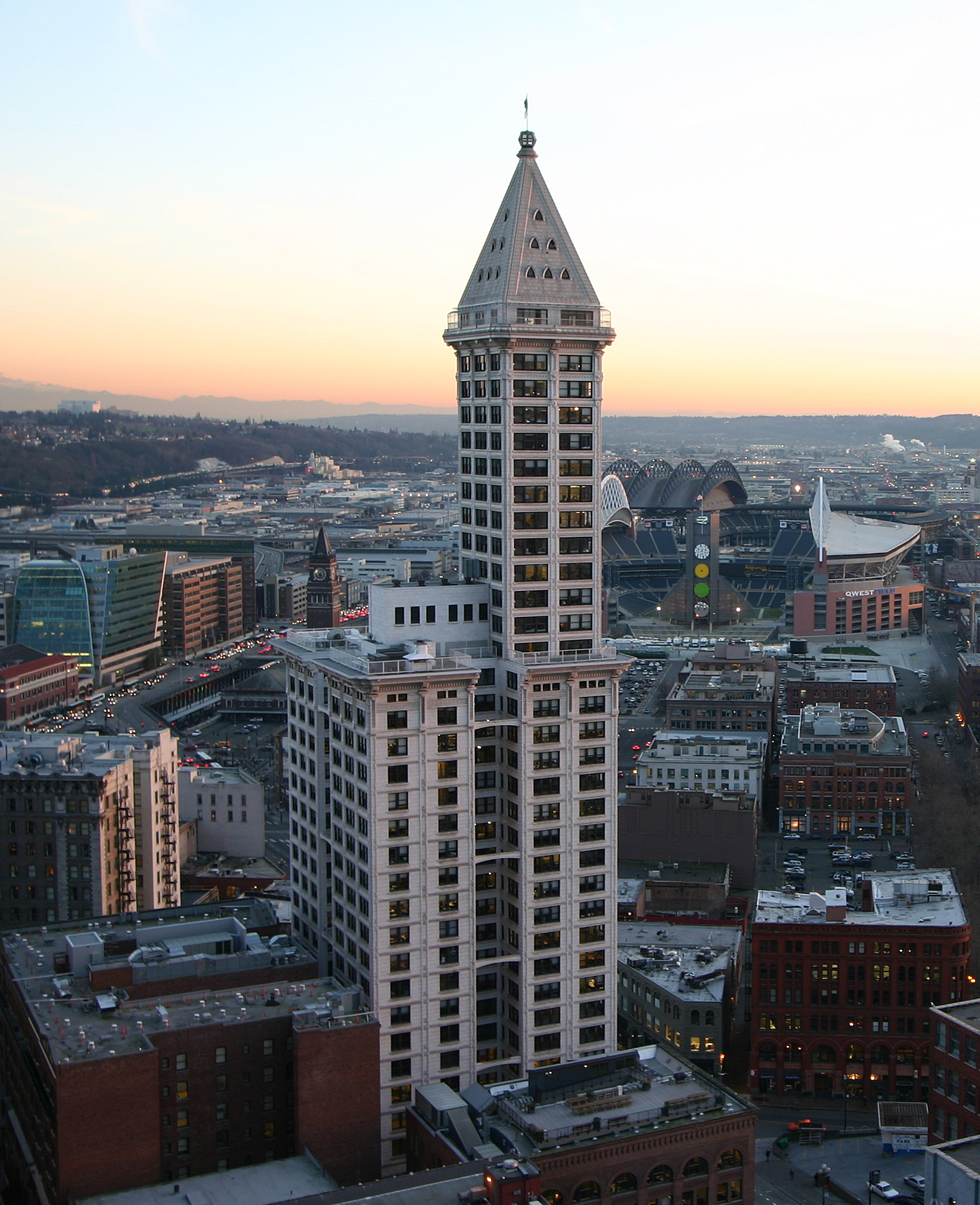
Smith Tower (completed 1914) viewed from the north

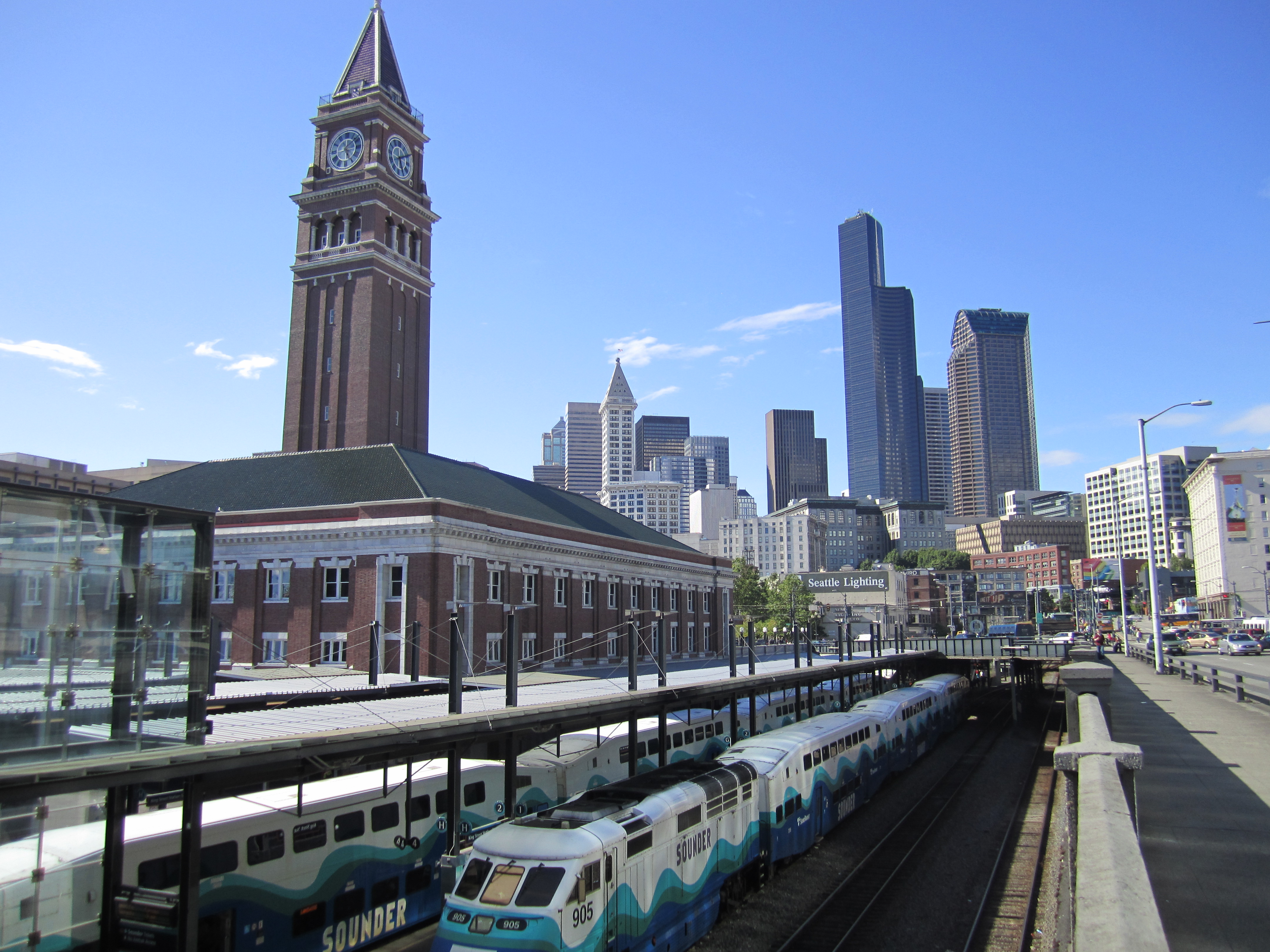
King Street Station and skyline

The architecture of Seattle, Washington, the largest city in the Pacific Northwest region of the U.S., features elements that predate the arrival of the area's first settlers of European ancestry in the mid-19th century, and has reflected and influenced numerous architectural styles over time. As of the early 21st century, a major construction boom continues to redefine the city's downtown area as well as neighborhoods such as Capitol Hill, Ballard and, perhaps most dramatically, South Lake Union.

== Native and native-influenced architecture ==
Prior to the arrival of European settlers in the Puget Sound area, the largest building in the Salish Sea region was Old Man House, a longhouse roughly 13.5 miles (21.7 km) northwest of Downtown Seattle near the present-day town of Suquamish. Measuring roughly 800 feet (240 m) in length, it was the largest longhouse ever known and remained the largest building in the region until it was burned by the United States government in 1870.

While there were no native structures of this scale within the city limits of present-day Seattle, the Duwamish tribe had at least 13 villages in that area. Of these, the largest and most important was dᶻidᶻəlal̕ič ("little crossing-over place") near present-day Pioneer Square, with an estimated 200 people in 1800, before Old World diseases caused massive death in the region. It consisted of eight longhouses, each roughly 60 by 120 feet (18 by 37 m), and an even larger potlatch house.

Although no significant architectural structures from the era before European settlement survive as anything more than archaeological sites, several present-day Seattle buildings deliberately evoke traditional regional Native American architecture. Examples of this include Daybreak Star Cultural Center in Discovery Park, owned by the United Indians of All Tribes; the Duwamish Longhouse, owned by the Duwamish tribe, just west of the Duwamish River, roughly across the street from the present-day Herring's House Park, whose name commemorates the second-largest historical Duwamish village, tohl-AHL-too ("herring's house") or hah-AH-poos ("where there are horse clams"); wǝɫǝbʔaltxʷ ("Intellectual House"), a multi-service learning and gathering space for Native American students, faculty and staff on the Seattle campus of the University of Washington; and Ivar's Salmon House, a restaurant on the north shore of Lake Union.

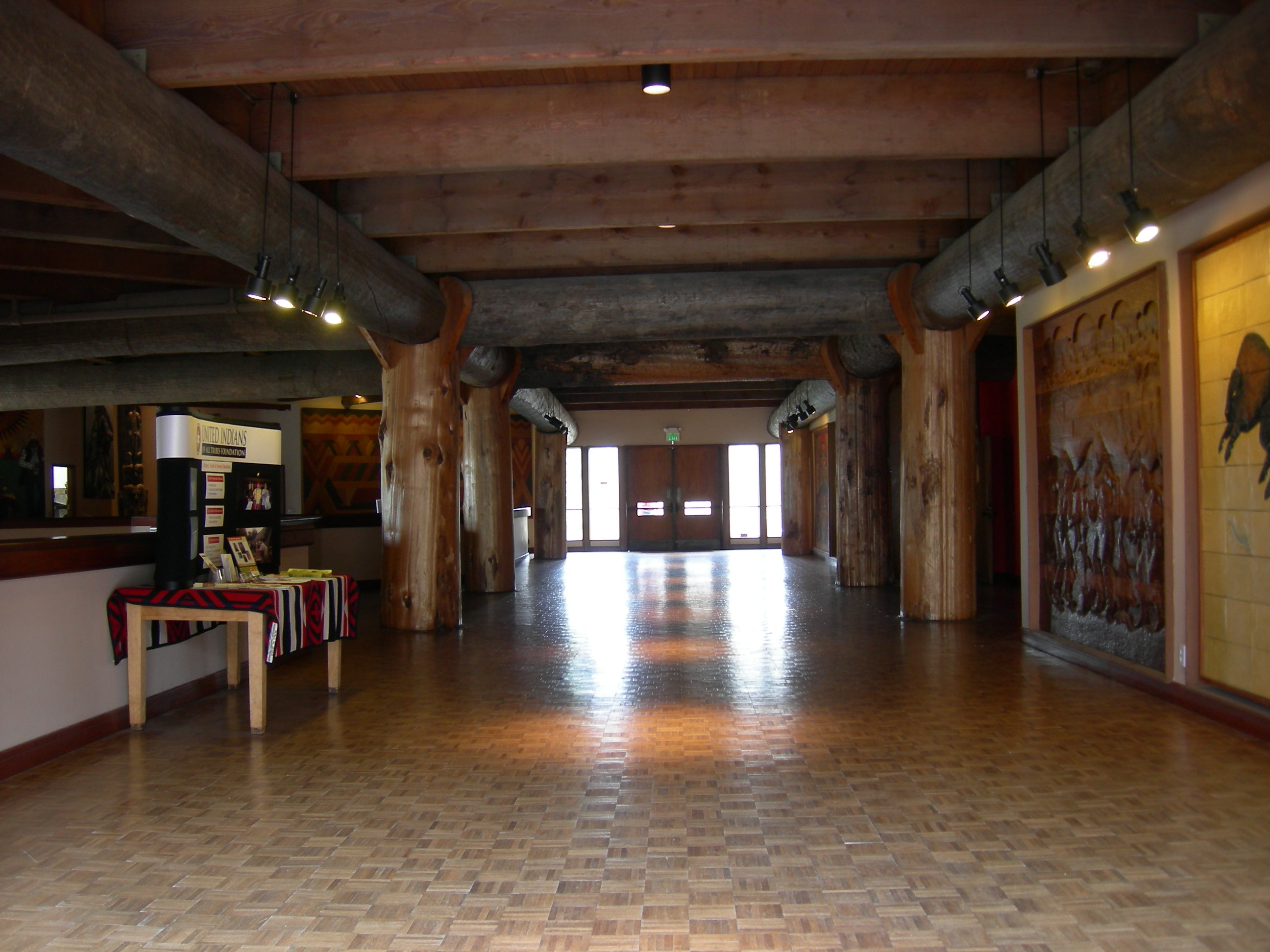
Interior, Daybreak Star Cultural Center

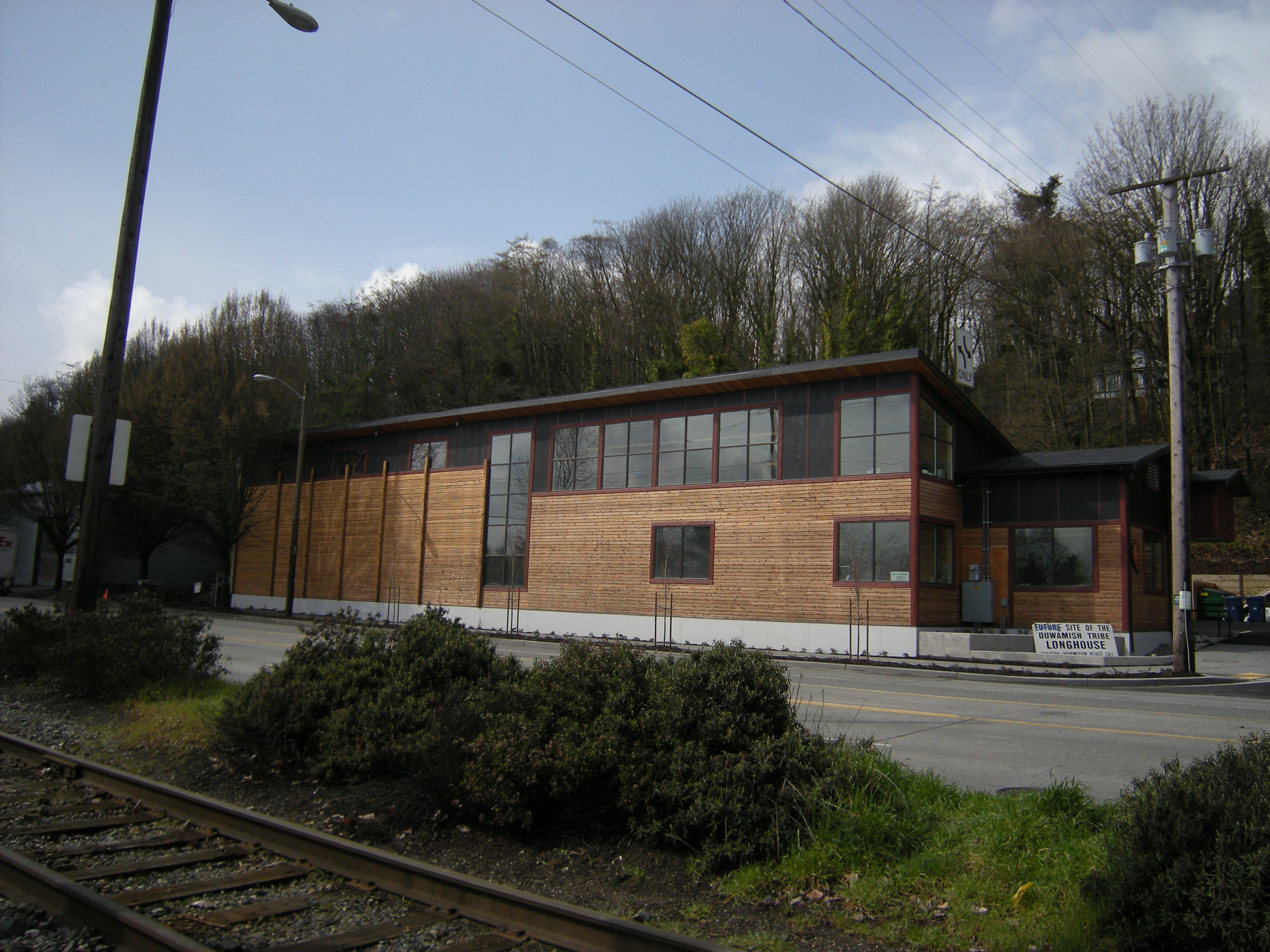
Duwamish Longhouse

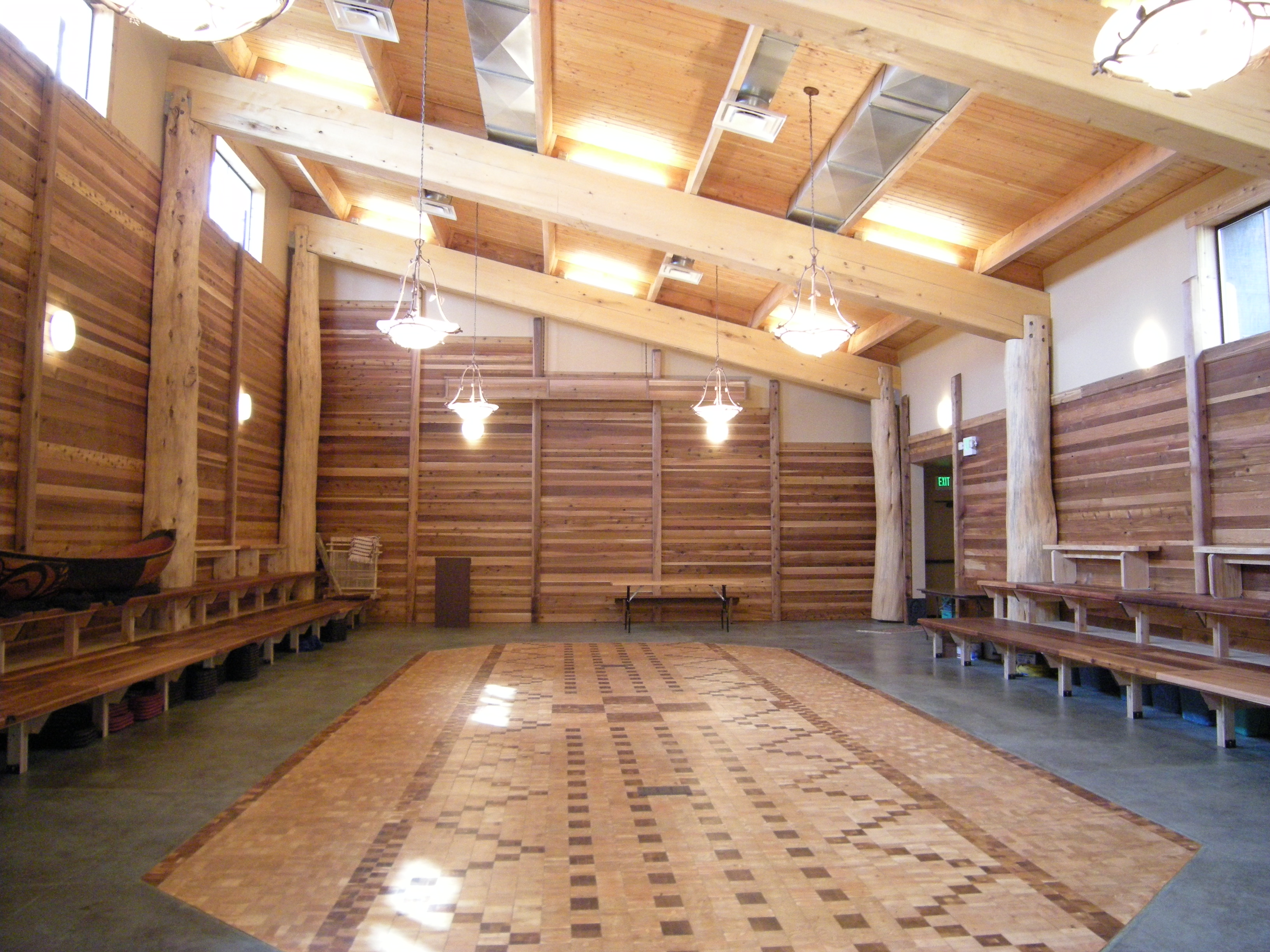
Interior, Duwamish Longhouse

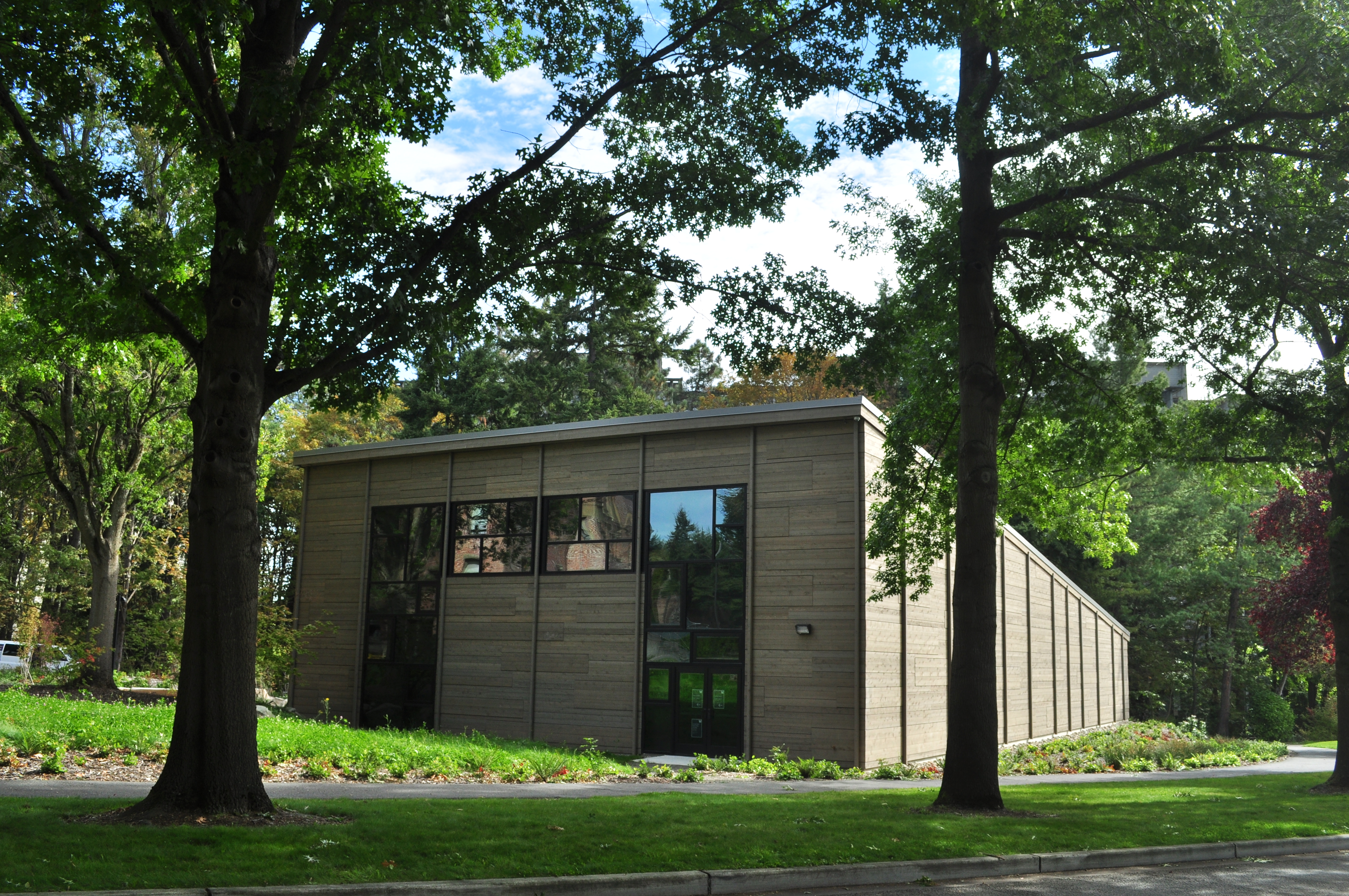
Intellectual House

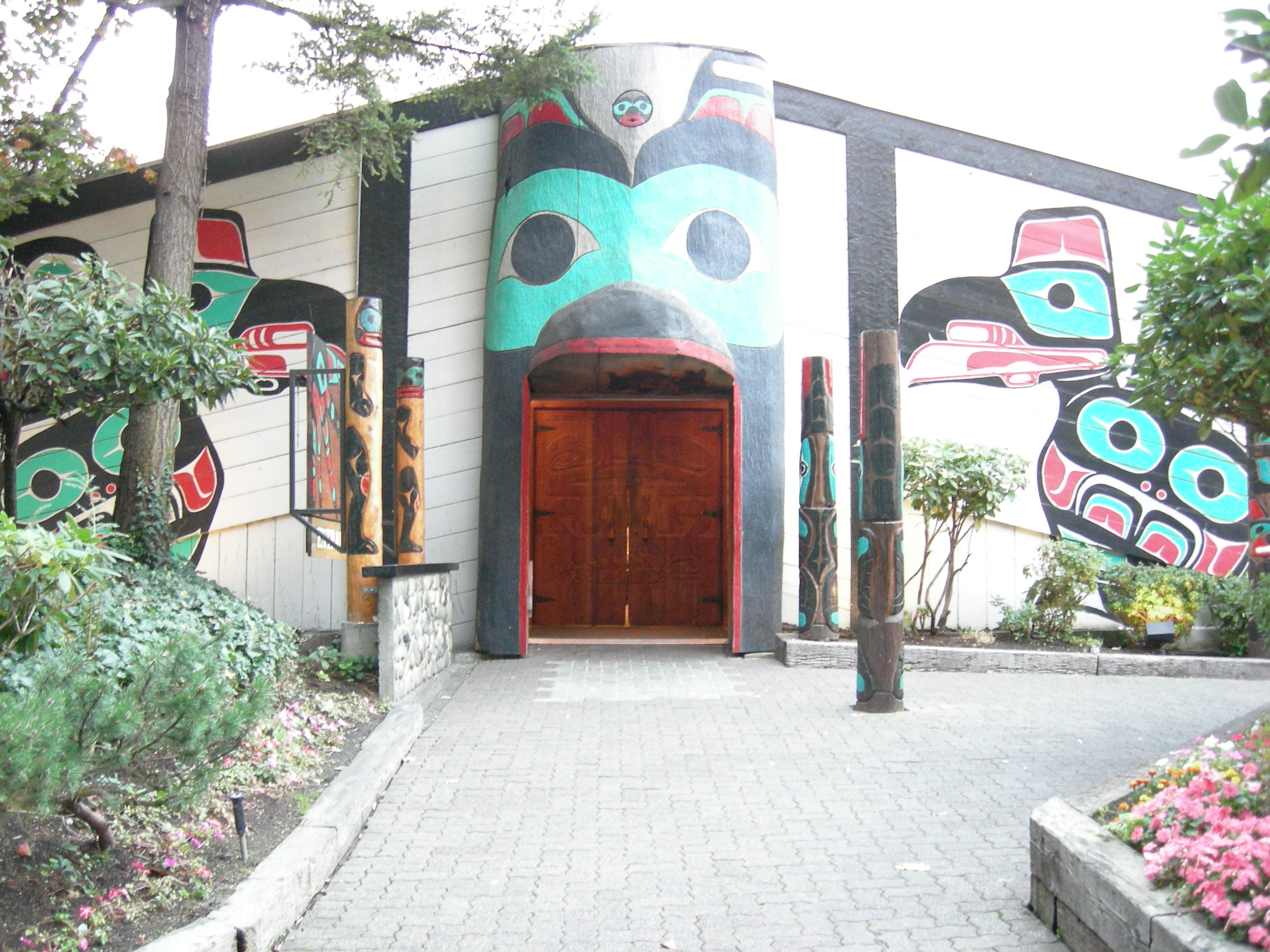
Main entrance of Ivar's Salmon House

== Prominent architects ==
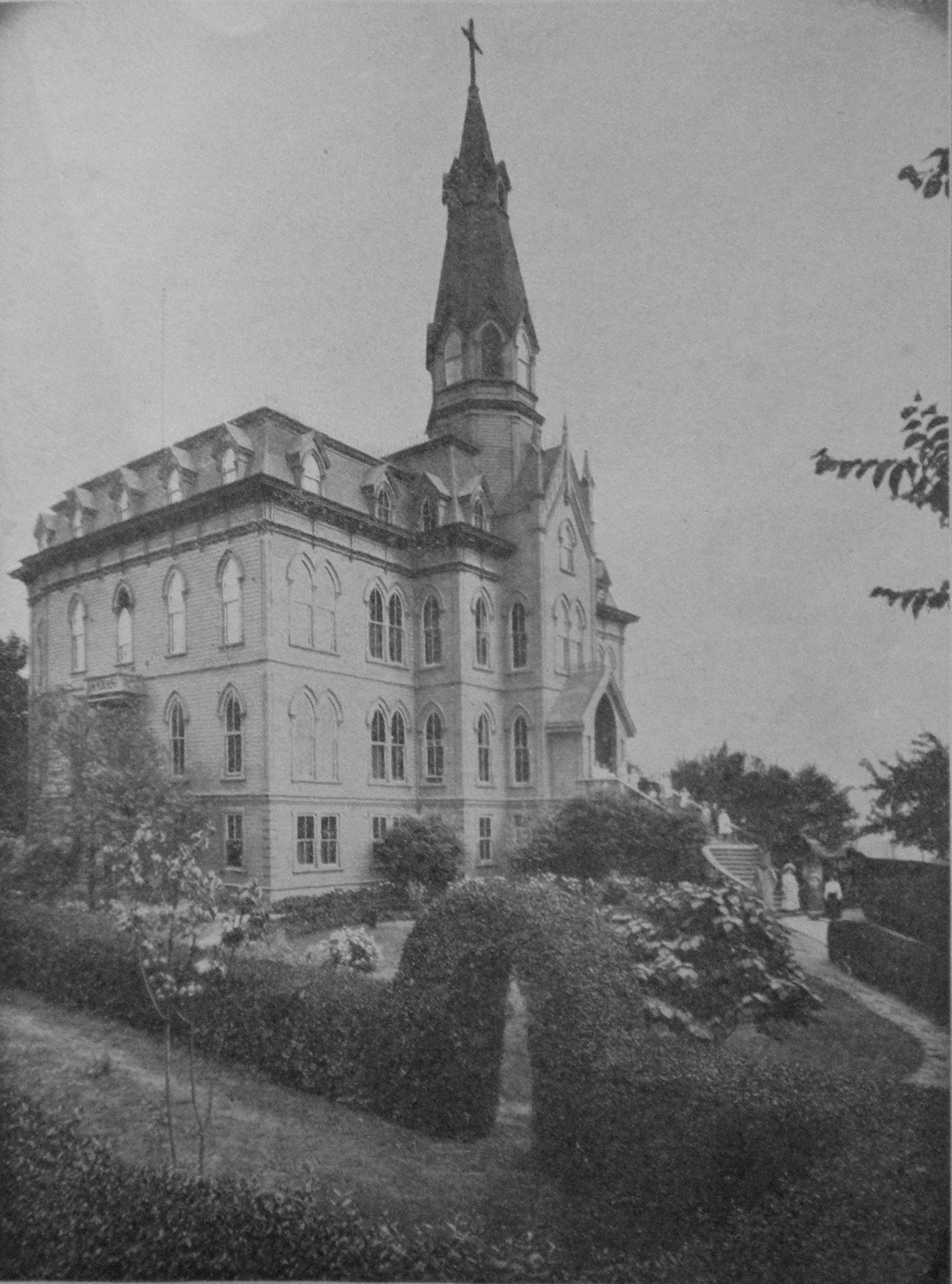
Holy Names Academy at Seventh and Jackson, pictured here in 1905

Among the first significant architects in the Pacific Northwest after European settlement were Mother Joseph of the Sacred Heart (born Esther Pariseau) and the barely-documented Donald McKay; neither has surviving work in Seattle, although works of both survive in Vancouver, Washington. In Seattle, the two collaborated on Providence Hospital (built 1882–1883; destroyed 1911) at Fifth and Madison, the current site of the William Kenzo Nakamura United States Courthouse. McKay was also responsible in the years 1882–1884 for a major enlargement of the now-demolished Catholic Church of Our Lady of Good Help, as well as designing the Occidental Hotel (First and Yesler, later site of the Seattle Hotel and now the "Sinking Ship" parking garage) and Seattle Engine House No. 1 (both lost in the 1889 Fire) and the Holy Names Academy at Seventh and Jackson (lost in the Jackson Street regrade of 1906).

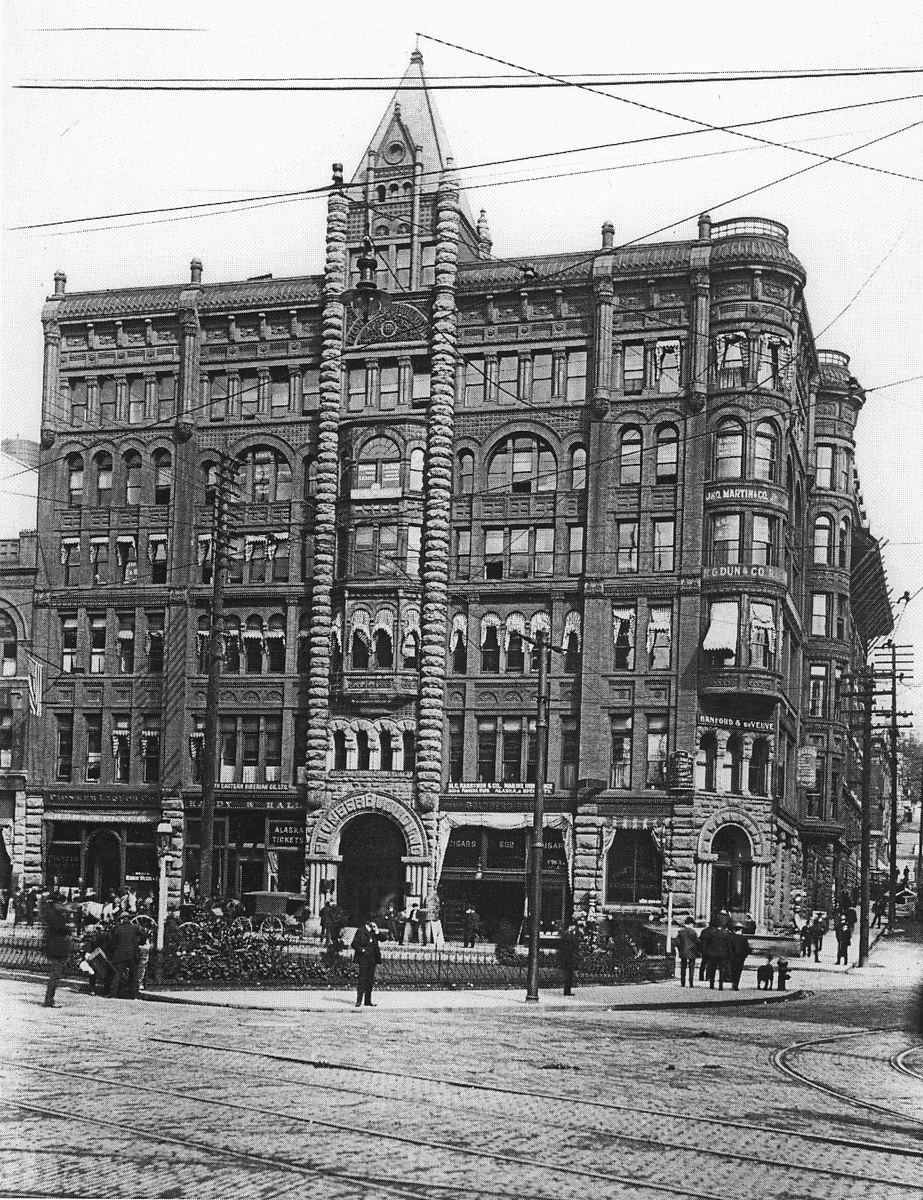
The Pioneer Building, pictured circa 1900

Elmer H. Fisher, an exponent of the Richardsonian Romanesque style, came to prominence immediately after the 1889 fire; he designed many of the new "fireproof" buildings in what is now the Pioneer Square neighborhood. His best-known surviving building is the Pioneer Building (built 1889–1891) directly on Pioneer Square at First and Yesler; his equally grand Burke Building, built at the same time, was demolished to make way for the Henry M. Jackson Federal Building; a few of its decorative elements survive on the plaza of that Federal Building. Two other surviving Fisher buildings are also right at First and Yesler: the Yesler Building on the southwest corner and the Mutual of New York Building on the northwest corner, both initially built 1890–1891 and later enlarged. His Austin A. Bell Building (1889–1890, now Bell Apartments) remains an equally prominent feature of Belltown.

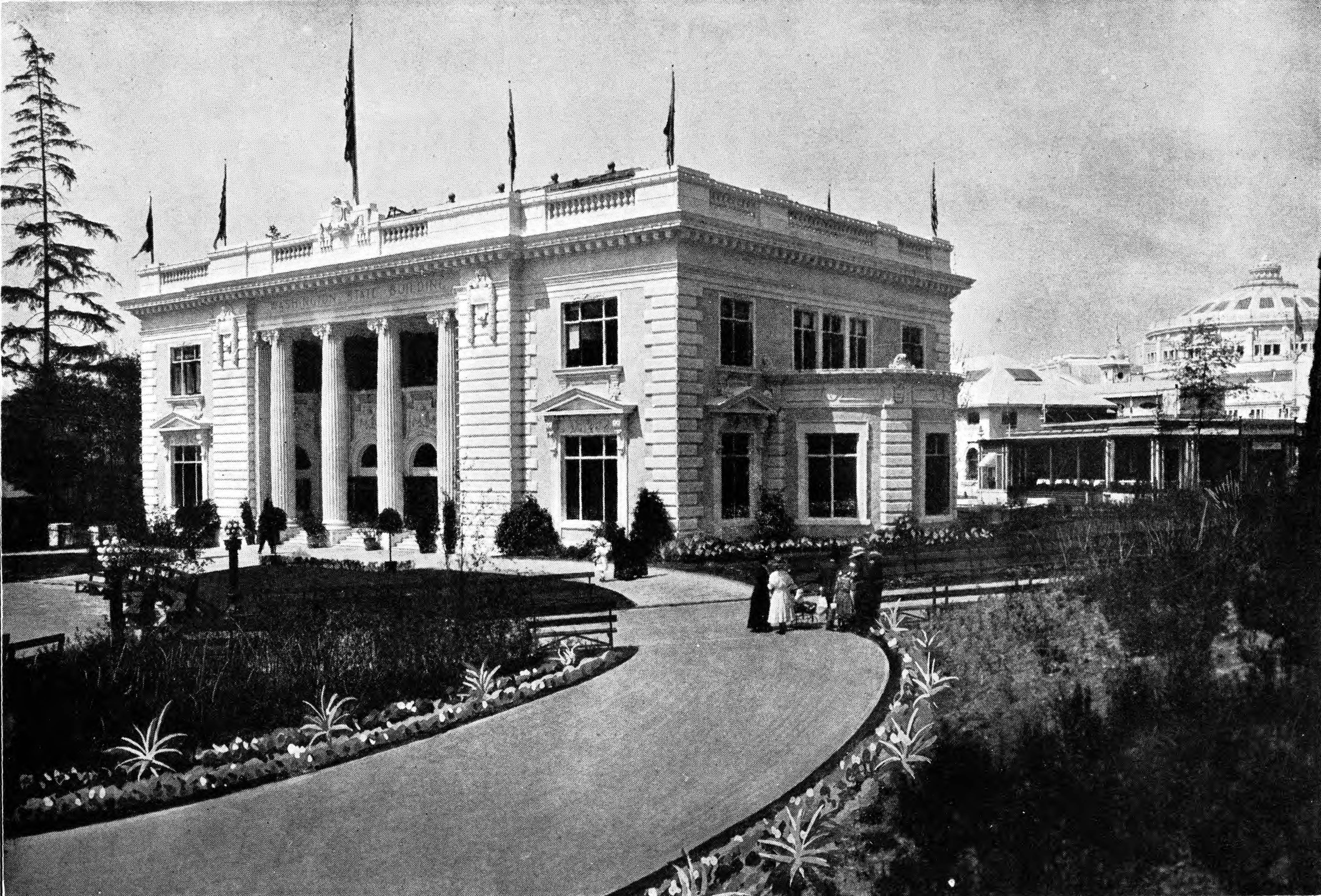
Bebb & Mendel's Washington State Building for the Alaska-Yukon-Pacific Exposition of 1909, a temporary structure on the University of Washington campus, which served as the exposition grounds

Englishman Charles Herbert Bebb and German Louis Leonard Mendel made their separate ways to Seattle in the 1890s. Their partnership Bebb & Mendel (1901–1914) was the city's most prominent architectural firm during its period of activity. Among their many surviving buildings in Seattle are the University Heights School (first portion built 1902), now a community center; the William Walker House (built 1906–1907, also known as "Hill-Crest") in the Washington Park neighborhood, now the official residence of the president of the University of Washington; the First Church of Christ, Scientist on Capitol Hill (built in two phases, 1908–1909, 1912–14), now converted into condominium apartments; the Frye Hotel (built 1906–1911); the Hoge Building (built 1909–1911) briefly the city's tallest building; and Fire Station No. 18 (built 1910–1911) in Ballard, now a bar and restaurant.

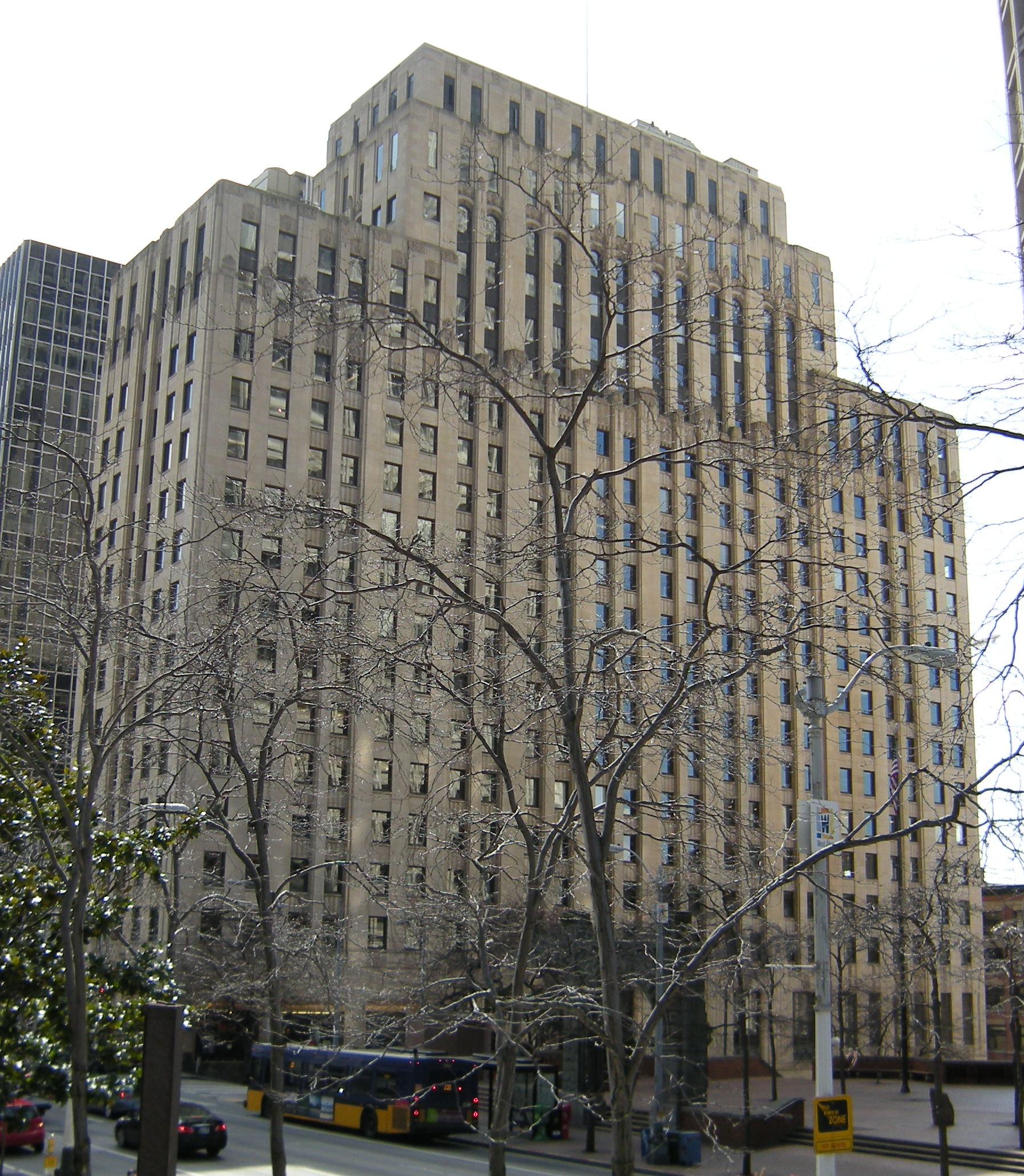
John Graham, Sr.'s Exchange Building (1929–1931)

Another Englishman who figured prominently in Seattle architecture was Liverpool-born John Graham, Sr. From 1905 to 1910 he was in partnership with David J. Myers; they designed houses, apartment buildings, and several Alaska-Yukon-Pacific Exposition pavilions. A prominent surviving Myers-Graham building is the main ("Seaview") building of The Kenney, a retirement home in West Seattle. He established his own firm in 1910; his numerous downtown buildings in this period include the Joshua Green Building (1913); the Frederick and Nelson department store (1916–1919), now Nordstrom's flagship store; and the Dexter Horton Building (1921–1924), an office building for First Seattle Dexter Horton National Bank, later Seafirst Bank. Other buildings from this period include the Ford Assembly Plant Building (1913) near the southeast corner of Lake Union—later home to the printer Craftsman Press and is now used as a self-storage building—and the Seattle Yacht Club (1919–1921) in Montlake. In the late 1920s he began working along Art Deco lines, with such buildings as the Roosevelt Hotel (1928–1929); the Bon Marché (1928–1929), now a Macy's; and the Exchange Building (1929–1931). Grant Hildebrand counts the Exchange Building as "perhaps Graham's finest work." He collaborated with Bebb and Gould on the U.S. Marine Hospital complex at the north end of Beacon Hill (1931–1934), later for more than a decade headquarters of Amazon.com, now Pacific Tower. Graham lived until 1955, but he collaborated with William L. Painter in New York City 1936–1942, and it was mainly Graham's son John Graham, Jr. who eventually built back up a Seattle practice for the firm.

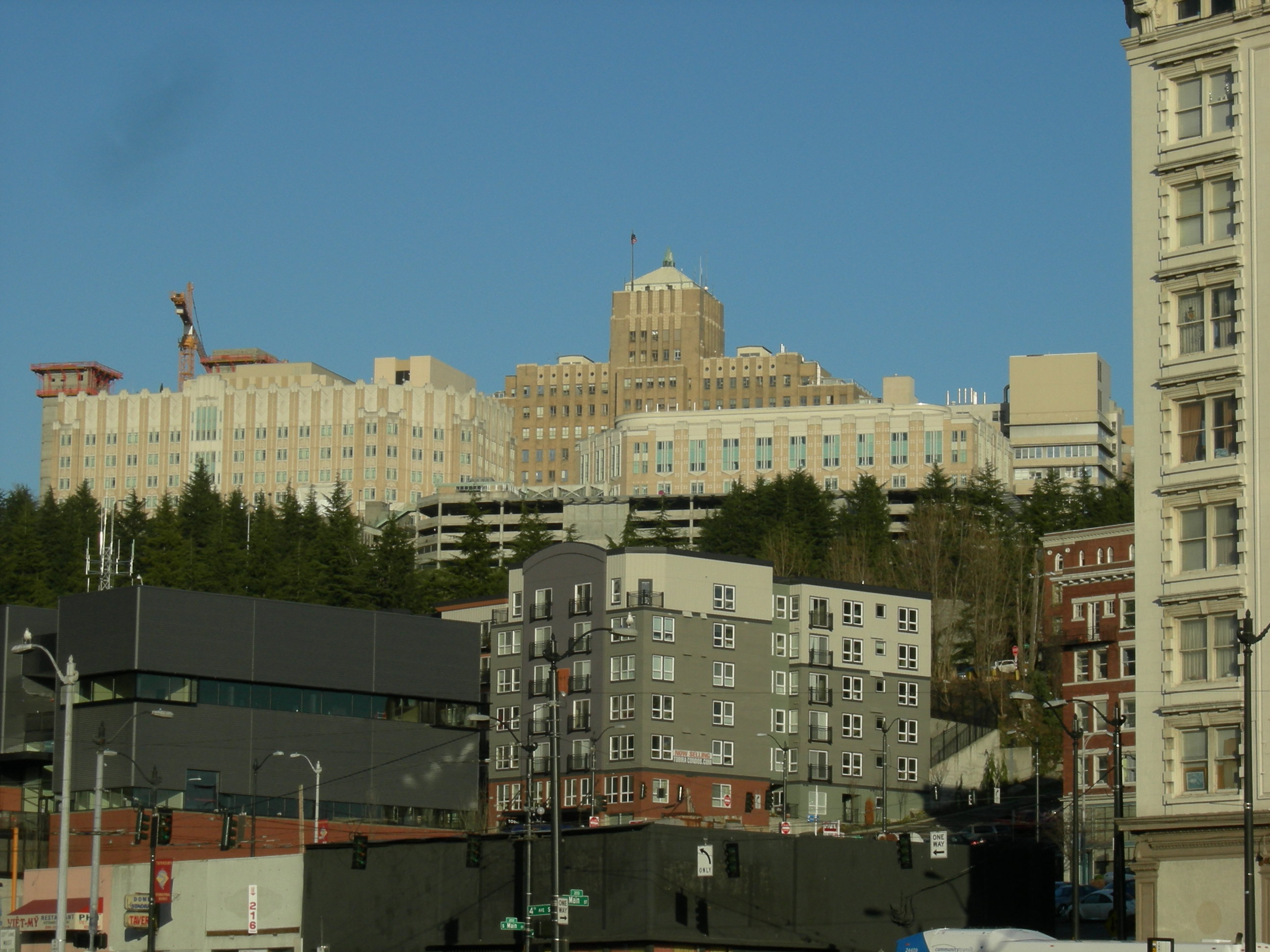
Harborview Hospital, still a prominent feature of Seattle's skyline, seen here from the Pioneer Square neighborhood

Iowa-born Harlan Thomas started his career in Colorado and traveled widely before arriving in Seattle in his mid-30s in 1906. By the end of 1907, he had already made his mark with his own Mediterranean-style villa on the west slope of Queen Anne Hill, the eclectic Chelsea Family Hotel across from Kinnear Park, and the Italianate Sorrento Hotel on the First Hill edge of Downtown before adopting a more stripped-down style influenced by Finnish architect Eliel Saarinen. In the following years he designed a number of schools around Washington state and partnered with various other architects on prominent Seattle buildings: with Clyde Grainger he designed the Corner Market building in Pike Place Market (1911–1912); with W. Marbury Somervell, three Carnegie libraries (1912–1915); with Schack, Young & Myers the Seattle Chamber of Commerce Building (1923–1925); and in the partnership Thomas, Grainger, and Thomas (the latter Thomas being his own son Donald), Seattle's Rhodes Department Store (1926–1927, later Arcade Plaza Building, now demolished), William O. McKay Ford Sales and Service Building (1925, now reconstructed as part of the Allen Institute for Brain Science), and Harborview Hospital (1929–1931). Other projects in and around Seattle included two fraternal buildings at the University of Washington (the former Delta Kappa Epsilon fraternity, 1914, now Tau Kappa Epsilon, and the Kappa Kappa Gamma sorority, 1930), a 500-unit World- War II-era housing project in Bremerton, Washington, and speculative housing designed for developer Albert Balch in northeast Seattle. He also taught architecture at the University of Washington 1926–1940.

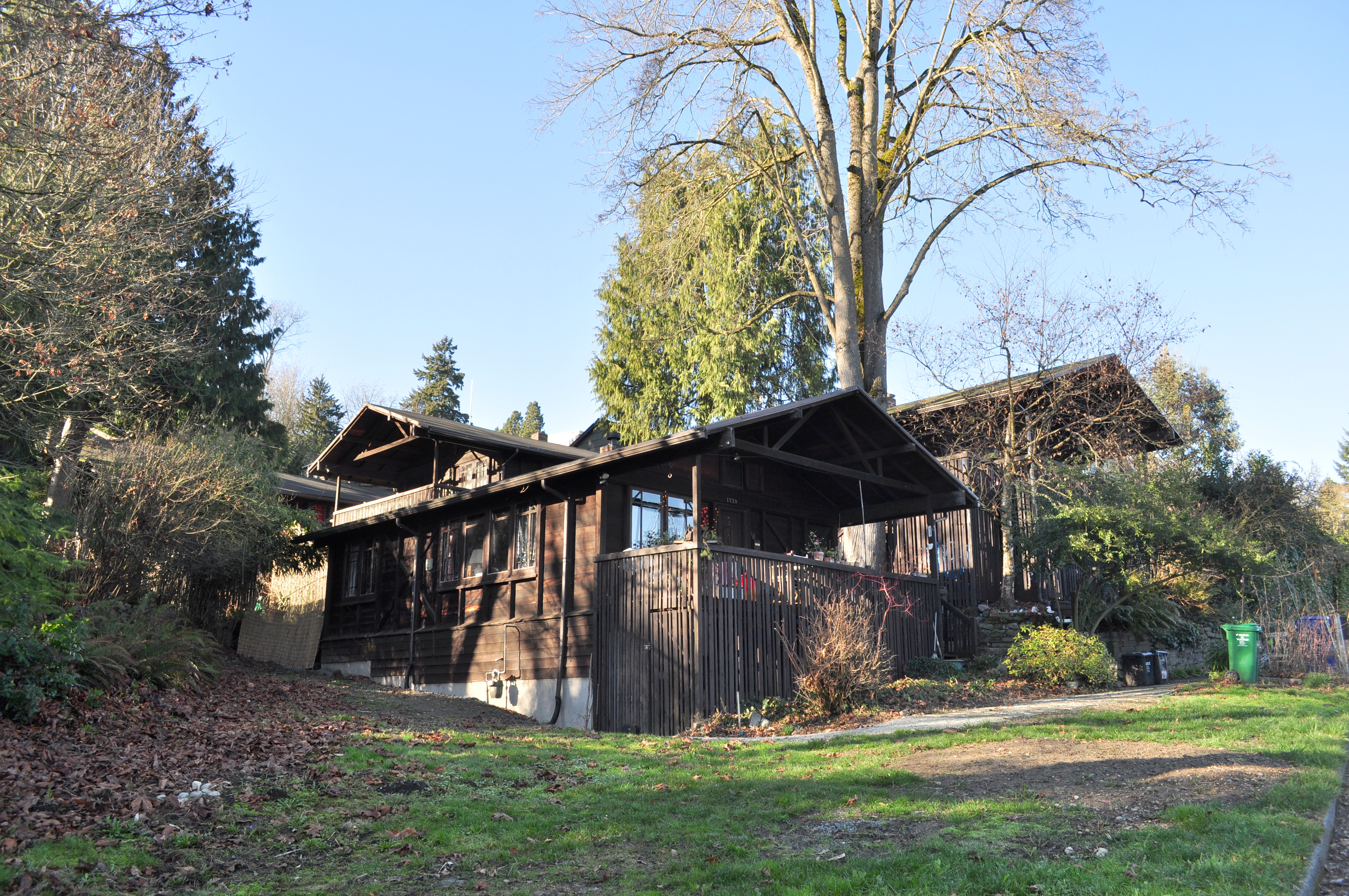
A number of modest, rustic cottages by Ellsworth Storey survive near Colman Park on the Lake Washington shore. Their Seattle Landmark status and recognition on the National Register of Historic Places has improved their chances of remaining in a neighborhood where few such modest residences remain.

Ellsworth Storey was from Chicago, first visited Seattle as a teenager, and settled there in 1903 after earning an architecture degree from the University of Illinois. Like Harlan Thomas, he debuted in Seattle as his own client, building a home for his parents and an adjacent one for himself and his wife. These Ellsworth Storey Residences in Denny-Blaine, completed in 1905, already show his characteristic style; as Grant Hildebrand describes it, "deep eaves, horizontal stretches of mullioned glazing, and above all the imaginative use of modest local materials," with influences from Swiss chalets, the Prairie School, and the English Arts and Crafts movement. (Bernard Maybeck in the San Francisco Bay Area seems to have arrived independently at a similar style.) "Although... hardly known nationally, few architects have engendered greater local affection." Not all of Storey's work is in this style: for example, his 1908 house for J.K. Gordon in the Mount Baker neighborhood is Georgian Revival, and many of his buildings fall broadly under the heading of Tudor Revival, such as Hoo-Hoo House (1909)—which was built for the Alaska-Yukon-Pacific Exposition and subsequently served until 1959 as the University of Washington Faculty Club—and a 1915–1916 Unitarian church, now University Presbyterian Church Chapel. In the 1920s, he designed numerous Seattle residences, church buildings, etc. Meanwhile, back in 1910–1915, Storey had acquired land near Colman Park on the Lake Washington shore and, on speculation, built a set of cottages in his characteristic style. This last proved a lucky thing for him, because in the Great Depression when there was little work for architects, he was still able to earn rents as a landlord while working on government projects such as parks throughout Western Washington and, during World War II, at Sand Point Naval Station.

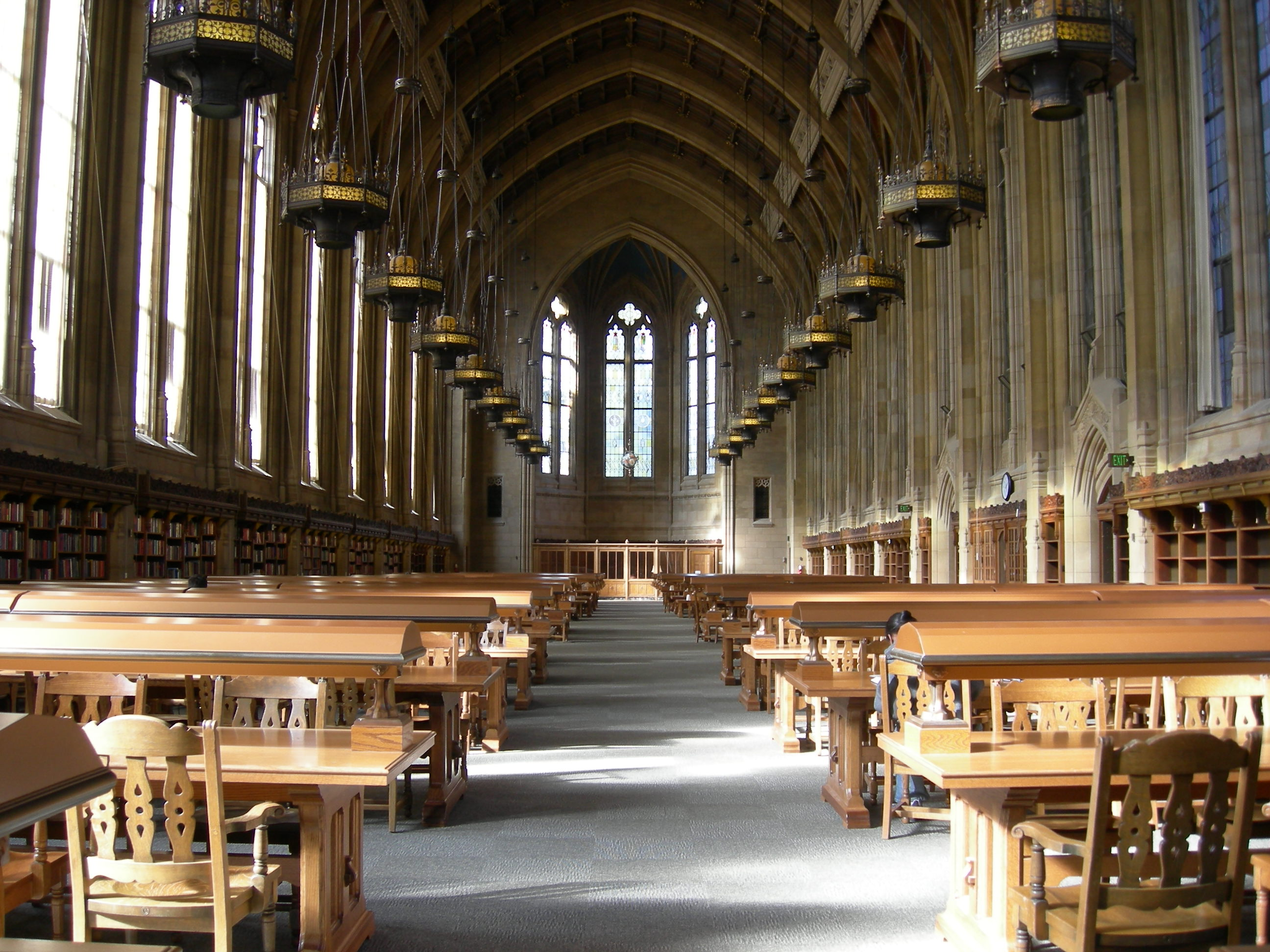
The graduate reading room, Suzzallo Library (Bebb & Gould, 1922–1927)

After his partner Louis Mendel retired in 1914, Charles Bebb partnered with Carl F. Gould in the firm Bebb & Gould. Bebb was more the businessman and engineer; Gould—who in this same period founded the Department of Architecture at the University of Washington (U.W.)—the designer and planner. The firm's style evolved from Historicism toward Art Moderne. Early on, the firm designed the Times Square Building (1913–1915) for the Seattle Times, the Administration Building (1914–1916) of the Ballard Locks, and developed a General Plan (1915) for the U.W. campus. They contributed to the tradition of Collegiate Gothic with U.W.'s Suzzallo Library—T. William Booth and William H. Wilson characterize the second-story reading room as Gould's "most inspired" interior space—before taking a decidedly more modern/Deco turn with Seattle's U.S. Marine Hospital (1930–1932; later, successively, Public Health Hospital, Pacific Medical Center, and with an additional wing Amazon.com headquarters; now Pacific Tower), the Art Institute of Seattle (1931–1933, now Seattle Asian Art Museum), and shortly before Gould's death in 1939, U.W.'s Penthouse Theater (1938–1940).

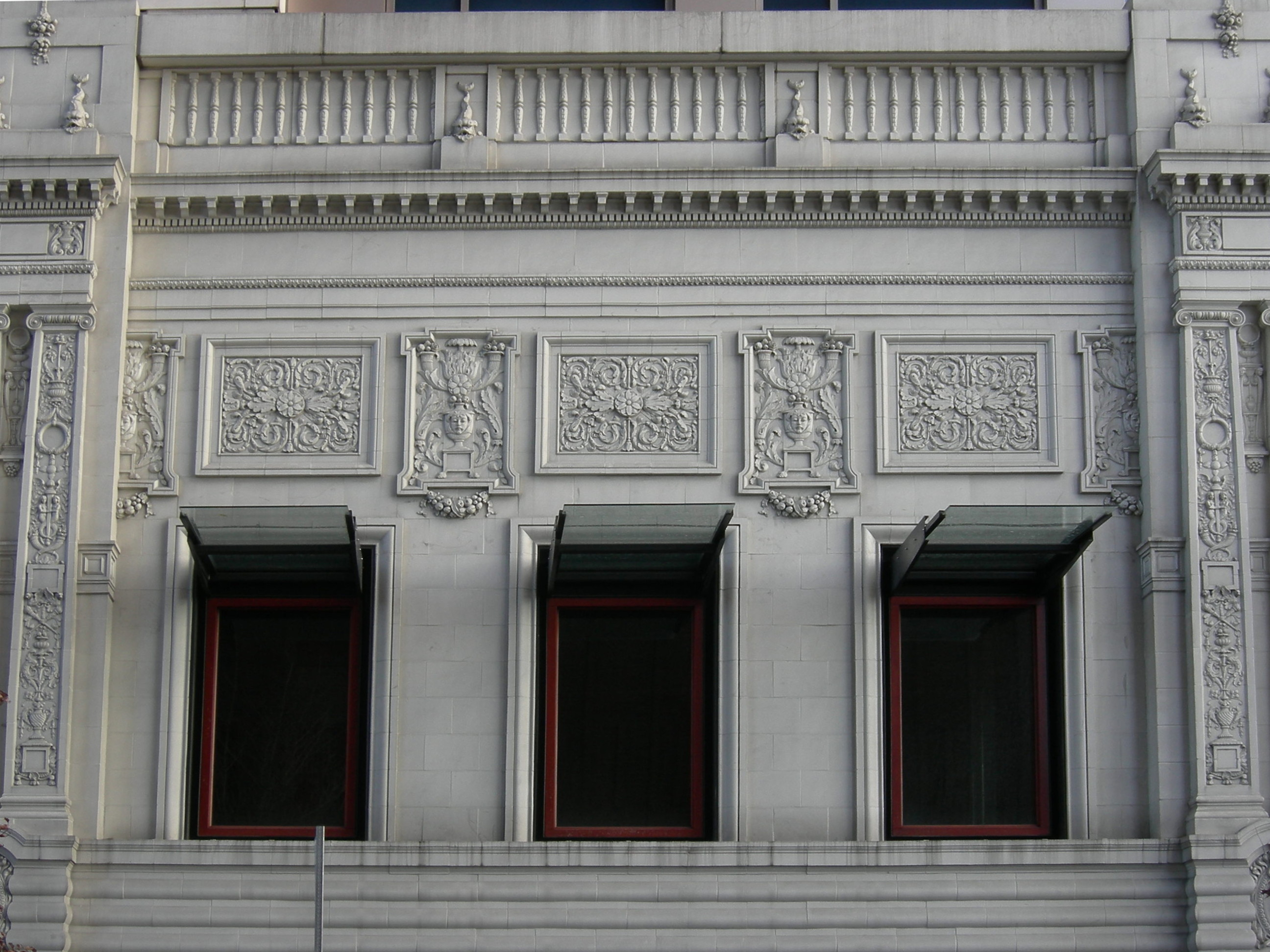
Terra cotta from the exterior of the Crystal Pool (B. Marcus Priteca, 1914) in Downtown Seattle, later (1944–2003) Bethel Temple, now part of the Cristalla apartment building.

Glasgow-born B. Marcus Priteca, was already an Associate of the Royal College of Arts, Edinburgh (now Edinburgh College of Art) when he came to Seattle at the age of 20 for the Alaska-Yukon-Pacific Exposition of 1909. By chance he met vaudeville entrepreneur Alexander Pantages; the two would have a long and fruitful partnership, with Priteca building theaters for Pantages in Seattle and elsewhere. He would eventually design "over 150 movie theaters including 60 of major import." His Seattle Pantages (a.k.a. Palomar) Theater and office block (1913–1915, demolished) and Coliseum Theater (1914–1916, now converted to retail use) were terra cotta-covered neo-classical showpieces that set the mold for a generation of "movie palaces". He also designed Seattle's Orpheum Theater (1926–27, replaced by the south tower of The Westin Seattle), and co-designed Seattle's still-extant Paramount Theatre (1927–28). Notable theaters of his outside Seattle include the Pantages Theater (Tacoma, Washington) (1919–18) and the later Art Deco-style Pantages Theatre (Hollywood) (1929–30); his smaller Admiral Theater in West Seattle (1942) also show significant Deco influence. Besides theaters, his work included synagogues, the Longacres race track, public housing, private homes, and many other buildings, mostly in or near Seattle. His Bikur Cholim synagogue (1912–1915) in Seattle's Central District is now the Langston Hughes Performing Arts Center.

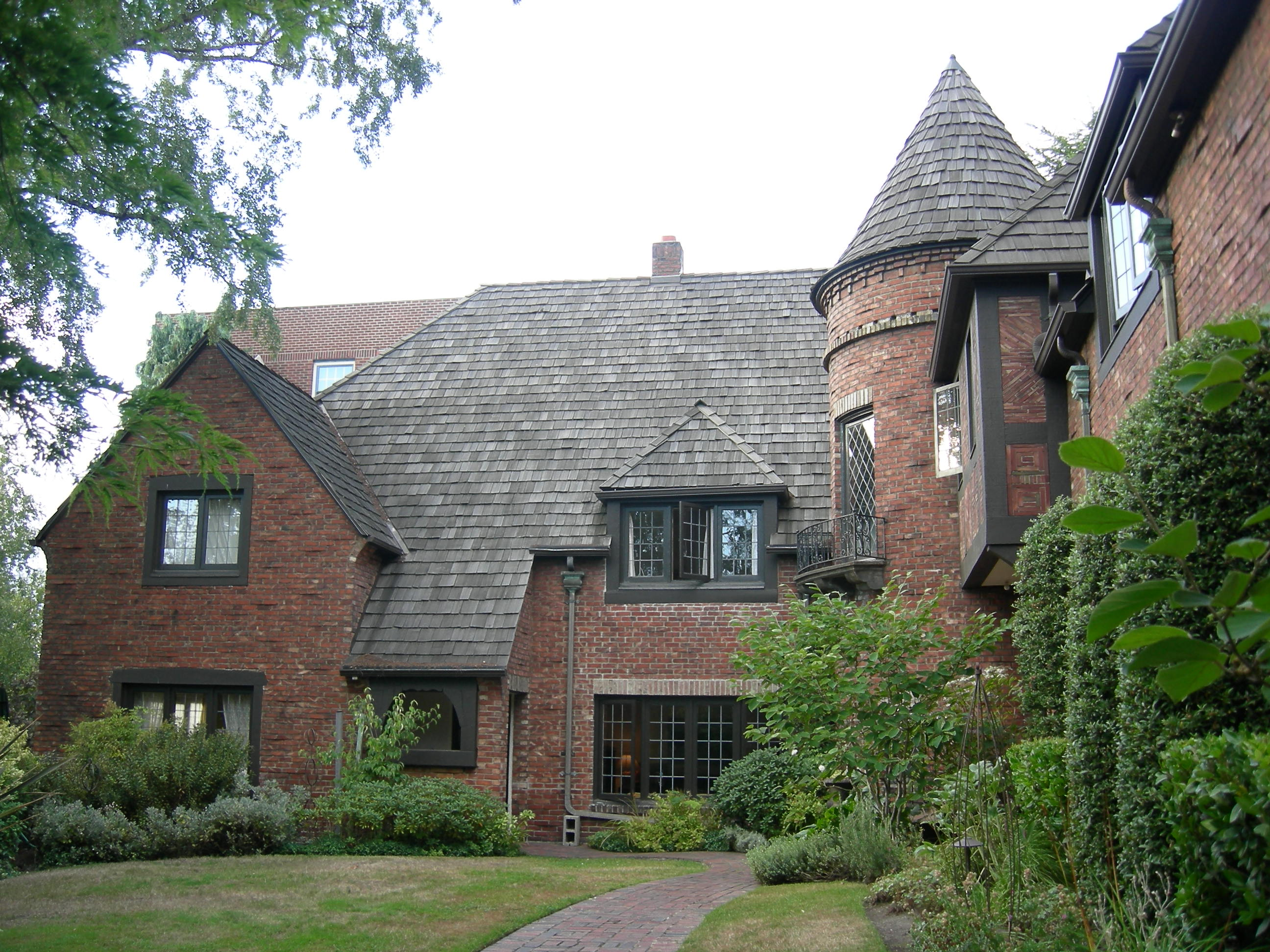
Oak Manor (Frederick Anhalt, 1928)

Properly speaking, Frederick Anhalt was a master builder rather than an architect, though late in life he was made an honorary member of AIA-Seattle. Arriving in Seattle in 1924 or 1925, he worked as a butcher and as a salesman before passing by way of leasing commercial buildings into construction. Originally building a wide variety of residential and commercial structures, he focused within a few years on luxury apartment buildings. When that market dried up in the Great Depression, between the mid-1930s and 1942 he built a number of speculative and custom houses, before abandoning construction for a successful nursery business. Apartments in his buildings from the late 1920s and early 1930s remain among the most sought after in Seattle. Three—1005 E. Roy Street, 1014 E. Roy Street, and 1600 E. John Street—have Seattle Landmark status in their own right, and others are in Historic Districts.

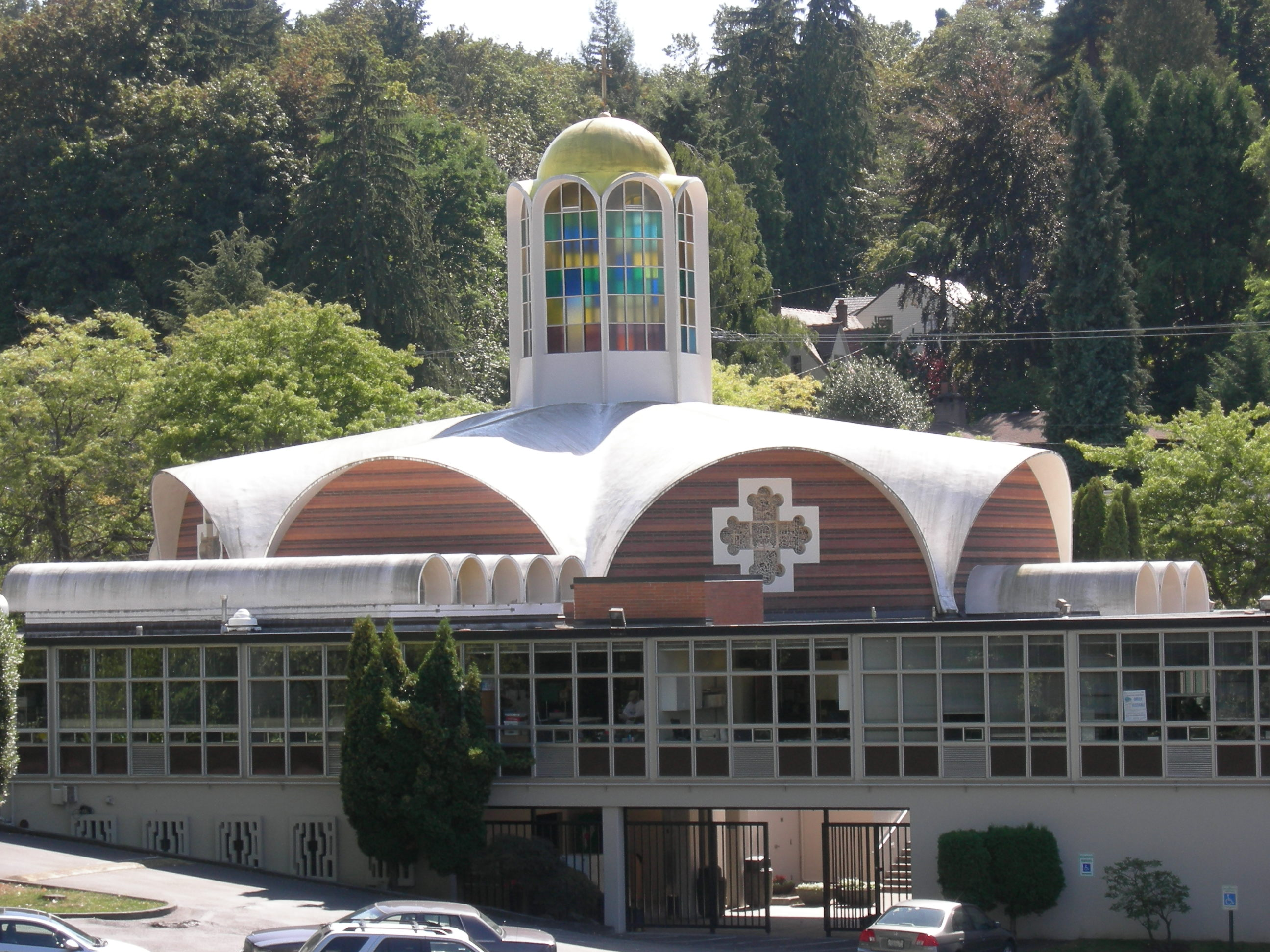
St. Demetrios Greek Orthodox Church (Paul Thiry, 1964–1968)

Nome, Alaska-born Paul Thiry (1904–1993) traveled several times to Europe, as well as around the world in the mid-1930s. Among the first to bring European Modern architecture to the Pacific Northwest, along with partner Alban Shay he soon developed a "softer, more regional variant, with gently sloped roofs and natural wood siding and trim" that became known as the Northwest Style. His work ranged from private homes to military buildings and dams; among other things he was principal architect for the Century 21 Exposition (1962 Seattle World's Fair) and served at a federal level on the National Capital Planning Commission, contributing to planning and preservation for the United States Capitol. Several of his Seattle buildings were deliberately temporary (e.g. buildings for the World's Fair), proved to be short-lived (e.g. Our Lady of the Lake Church in Wedgwood, 1940–1941, outgrown and replaced in a mere 20 years; Museum of History and Industry, 1948–1950 in Montlake, demolished to make way for expansion of a freeway), or have been heavily altered and expanded. Among his surviving buildings in Seattle are the KeyArena (1958–1962, originally the Seattle Center Coliseum, interior much altered), the Northeast Library (1954, later expanded), and St. Demetrios Greek Orthodox Church (1964–1968).

University Unitarian Church (Paul Hayden Kirk, 1955–1959)

Paul Hayden Kirk, another modernist and "the most widely published of Seattle's architects," was born in Salt Lake City but moved to Seattle with his family as a child. His early work was residential and historicist; in the 1940s he began to move in the direction of the International Style and to work increasingly on religious and public buildings. By the mid-1950s, he was developing a modernist style of his own, adopting similar materials to those used by Thiry. Among his buildings in Seattle are University Unitarian Church (1955–1959), Japanese Presbyterian Church (1962–1963), the Magnolia branch of Seattle Public Library (1962–1964), and Meany Hall (1966–1974), the Odegaard Undergraduate Library (1966–1971), and the associated underground parking structure on the University of Washington main campus.

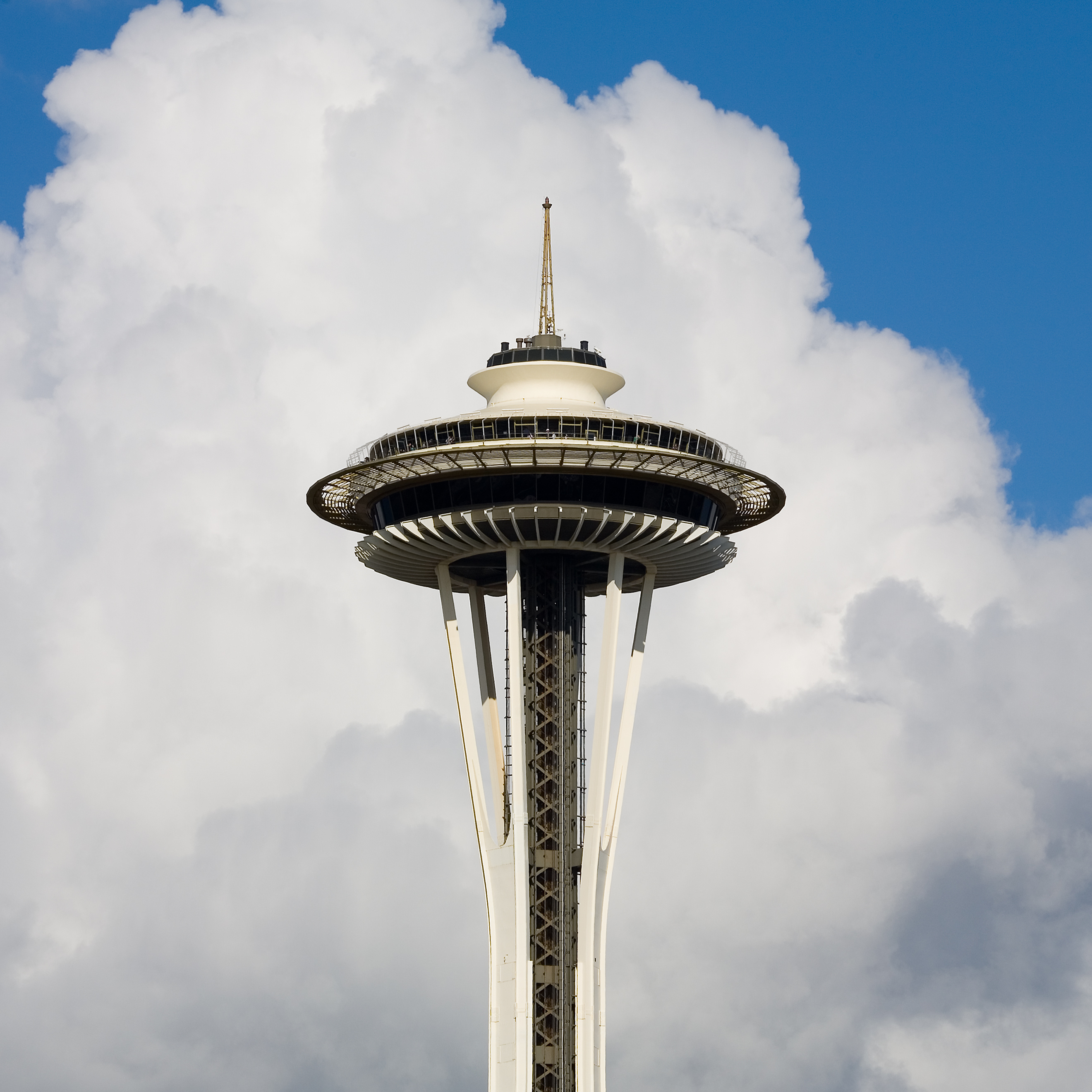
Space Needle (John Graham, Jr., 1960–1962)

John Graham, Jr. (1908–1991) revived the Seattle practice of his father's company in the mid-20th century. Seattle's Northgate Mall (originally Northgate Center, 1946–1950) was the first of the firm's over 70 large-scale shopping centers around the country. Outside of shopping malls, the firm's practice ran heavily to large corporate and institutional clients. Graham projects in Seattle include the brutalist headquarters of Washington Natural Gas (built 1962–1964; later used by University of Washington Medicine; Washington Natural Gas is now Puget Sound Energy); a Seattle high-rise for the Bank of California (1971–1974); the Seattle Sheraton (1978–1982); and the iconic Space Needle (1960–1962) designed jointly with Victor Steinbrueck for the Century 21 Exposition in the Googie style.

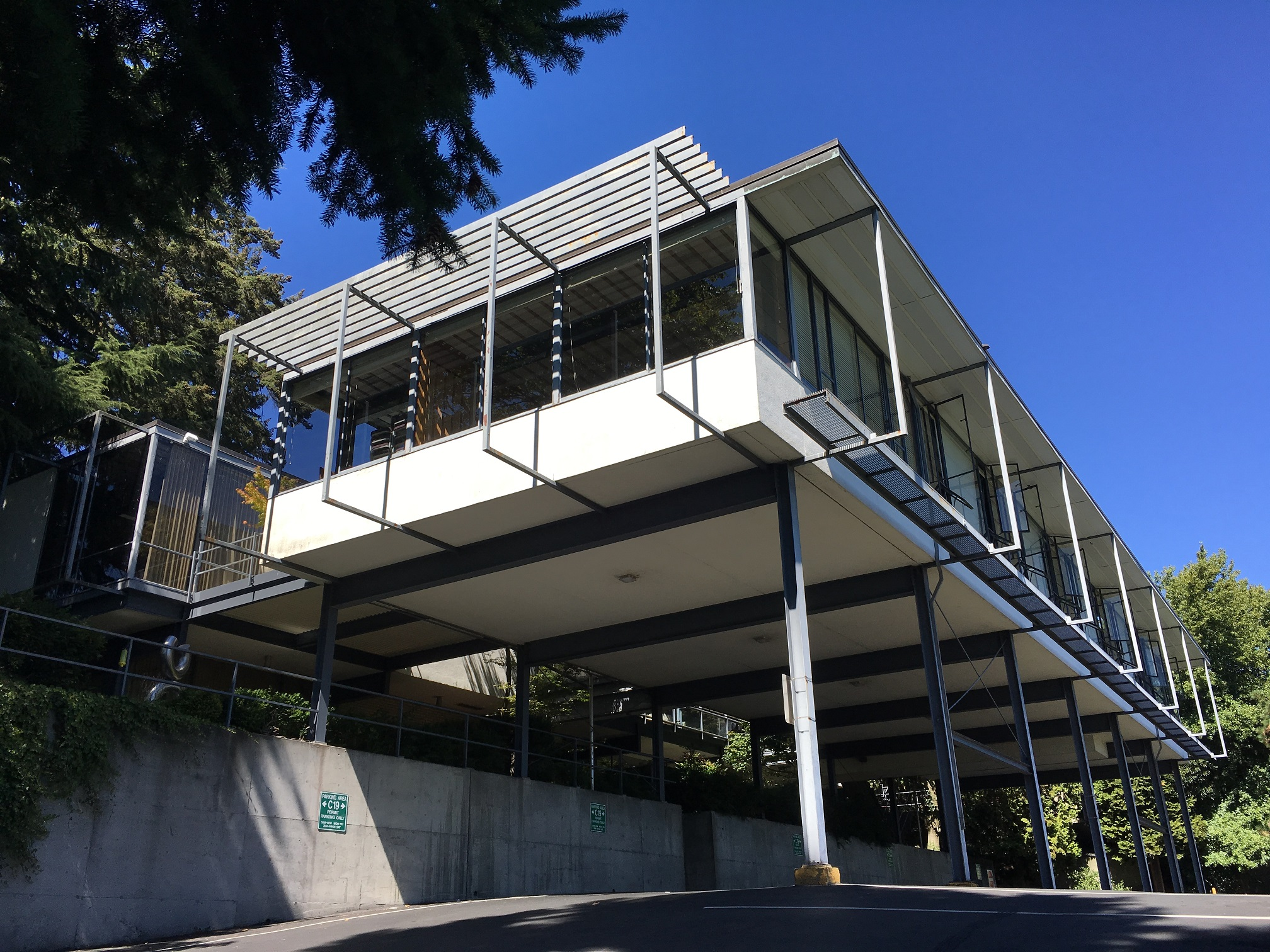
University of Washington Faculty Club (Paul Hayden Kirk and Victor Steinbrueck, 1958–1960)

Despite his involvement in designing the iconic Space Needle, Victor Steinbrueck is best known as a preservationist and for his sketches of the city. Born in North Dakota, he participated in the Civilian Conservation Corps, worked for various Seattle architects including William J. Bain and built houses, including one for artist Alden Mason (1949), in the same regional modernist style as Thiry and Kirk; he worked with Kirk on the Faculty Center of the University of Washington. Through what Heather MacIntosh describes as "a combination of socialism and romanticism," he became increasingly interested in preservation and public space, with a particular focus on Pike Place Market. He published three books of sketches and commentary, Seattle Cityscape (1962), Market Sketchbook (1968) and Seattle Cityscape #2 (1973), and co-designed three Seattle parks with landscape architect Richard Haag. One of those, Victor Steinbrueck Park in Pike Place Market, originally Market Park (1981–1982), was renamed in his honor after his death.

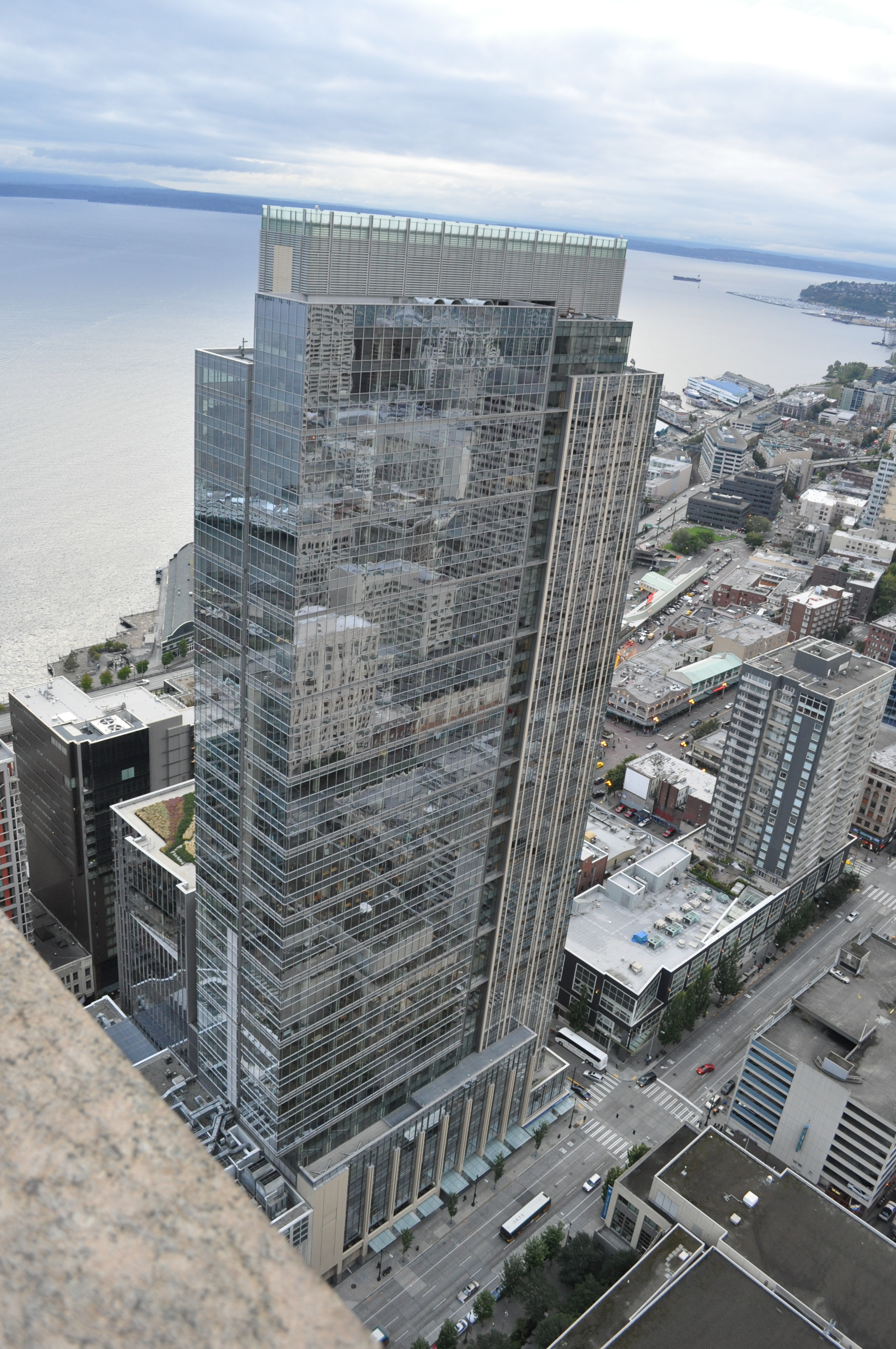
Russell Investments Center and Seattle Art Museum (NBBJ, completed 2006)

In 1943 Seattle architects Floyd Naramore, William J. Bain, Clifton Brady, and Perry Johanson formed a partnership to accept large-scale federal commissions in the Seattle area, including expansion of the Bremerton Naval Shipyard. That firm became NBBJ, with offices in Beijing, Boston, Columbus, Ohio, Hong Kong, London, Los Angeles, New York City, Pune, San Francisco, and Shanghai, as well as Seattle. Naramore and Bain, in particular, already had distinguished careers at the time the partnership was formed, with Naramore (often assisted by Brady) having designed numerous Seattle public schools including Garfield, Roosevelt, and Cleveland high schools and Bain designing numerous buildings including the now-landmarked Belroy Apartments and co-designing the Yesler Terrace public housing complex. Prominent NBBJ buildings in or near Seattle include Boeing Commercial Airplane Headquarters (Renton, Washington, 2004), Bill & Melinda Gates Foundation Headquarters (2011), Russell Investments Center (2006, originally WaMu Center), which also houses the Seattle Art Museum and the Bill & Melinda Gates Foundation Headquarters (2011).

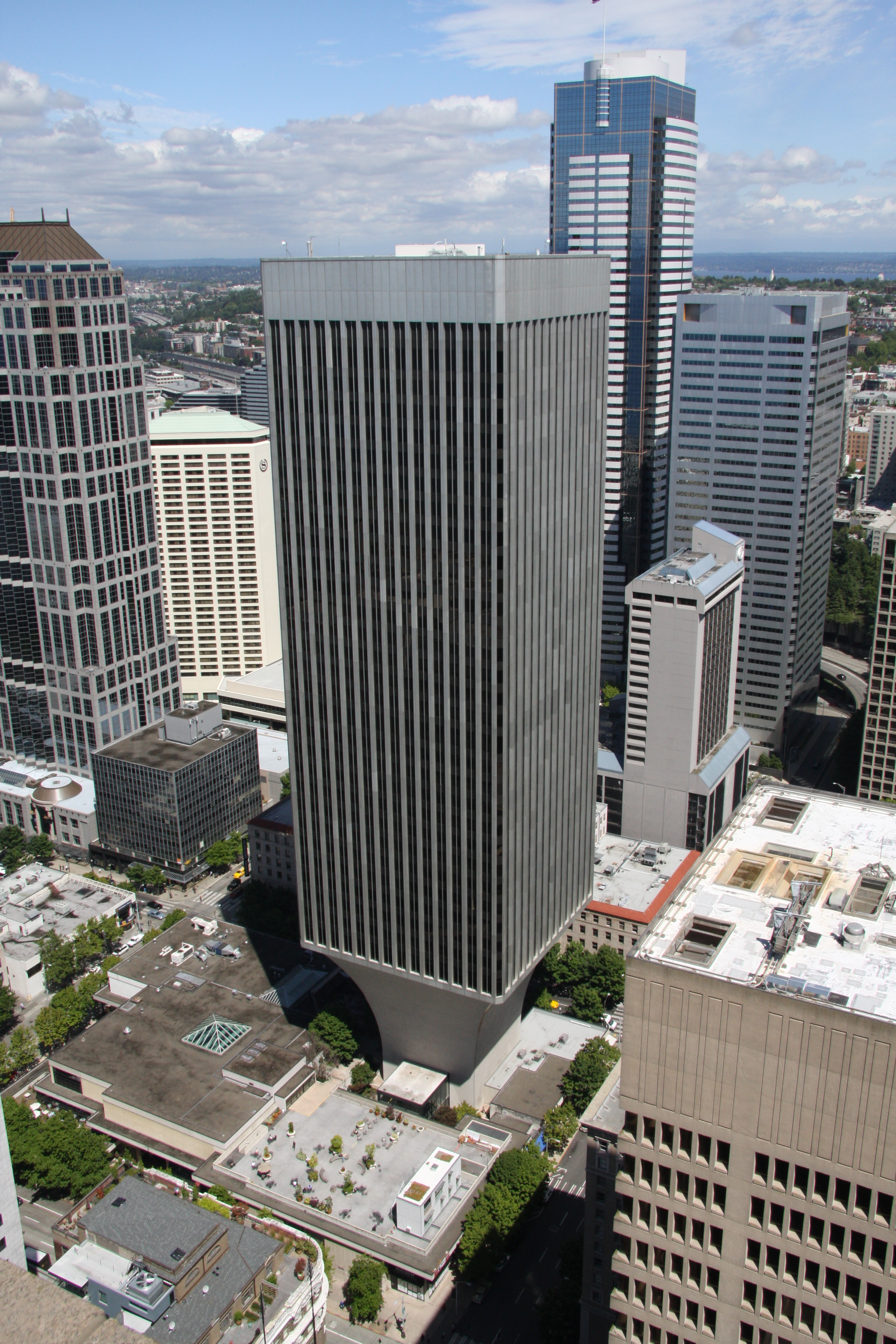
Rainier Tower (Minoru Yamasaki and NBBJ, 1973–1978)

Seattle-born Minoru Yamasaki, a key figure of the New Formalism, based his career in New York City, where his projects included the World Trade Center, but also had a significant architectural impact on his native city. He first came to prominence with the Pacific Science Center, originally the United States Science Pavilion for the Century 21 Exposition. He also designed the IBM Building (1959–1962) and the Rainier Tower (1973–1978), both in conjunction with NBBJ.

Besides NBBJ, other prominent Seattle architectural firms in recent decades include Callison (acquired by Arcadis NV in 2014 and formally merged in October 2015 RTKL Associates, to form CallisonRTKL headquartered in Baltimore, Maryland); Weber Thompson; Bassetti Architects; and, bridging from architecture into landscape architecture, Jones & Jones. Callison (and now CallisonRTKL) was a large firm taking on projects around the world, with projects as far-flung as Jackson Hole, Wyoming, Shanghai, London, and Qatar, and building or remodeling over 100 shops for Seattle-based Nordstrom. Among their projects in Seattle itself are Seattle's W Hotel, and the office building 2201 Westlake. Weber Thompson, with a more local focus, employs over 70 architects in a practice involving high-rise buildings, interior design, landscape architecture, affordable housing, and sustainable design. Their Seattle high-rises include Fifteen Twenty-One Second Avenue (completed 2008), Premiere on Pine (completed 2014), *Cirrus (completed 2015), and Luma (completed 2016). The slightly smaller Bassetti Architects has renovated numerous landmarks (e.g. Post Alley Market, the Sanitary Public Market building, the Silver Oakum Building, and the Triangle Market, all within Pike Place Market) and has built or renovated numerous public schools in and around Seattle. Jones & Jones, a boutique operation by comparison, has designed numerous parks and pioneered the habitat immersion method of zoo design in their work for Seattle's Woodland Park Zoo. One of their partners, Johnpaul Jones, who is Choctaw and Cherokee on his mother's side, has made major contributions to buildings related to Native American culture, including the Smithsonian Institution's National Museum of the American Indian and was the first architect ever to receive the National Humanities Medal. In Seattle, besides several zoo exhibits, they were responsible for the People's Lodge expansion of the Daybreak Star Cultural Center in Discovery Park and Intellectual House, a Native American center at the University of Washington.

At least two Pritzker Architecture Prize-winning architects are represented by buildings in Seattle: Frank Gehry designed the Museum of Pop Culture (2000, originally Experience Music Project) and Rem Koolhaas designed the Seattle Central Library (2004).

== Residential architecture ==
=== Houses ===
Summarizing the styles of Seattle single-family residential architecture in 1986, Jim Stacey identified the typical houses of the inner neighborhoods as "Both one and two-story older frame houses, with such names as bungalow, craftsman, Tudor, Victorian, Dutch Colonial, and saltbox," noting roughly 5 miles (8.0 km) from the center these give way to newer styles such as "rambler and split-level" with Cape Cods in between, both chronologically and geographically. Few homes survive from before 1900. Prior to the World War II era, homes were constructed mostly of brick or wood, with a wider variety of materials after that. Many concrete block houses were built in the 1950s. Sam DeBord lists major styles chronologically as "Queen Anne – Victorian, Seattle Box – Four Square, Craftsman Bungalow – Arts and Crafts, Dutch Colonial, Tudor, Cape Cod, Mid-Century, Stark 60s Modern, Split-Entry, NW Contemporary – Minimalist, Post-Modernism" along with recent "Traditional Revivals" and "Modern Hybrids".

Seattle in the 21st century is essentially a "built-out" city: typically, to build new houses means demolishing older houses. As of 2016, Seattle builders are tearing down older homes at the average of about one a day; most are being replaced with larger homes. The most affected areas are Ballard and the Central District, followed by Crown Hill/North Greenwood, Queen Anne, Green Lake/Wallingford and Phinney Ridge/Fremont.

Pacific Northwest Contemporary is a modern architecture style that emerged in the 21st century following Northwest Regional style of the mid-20th century. It retains earlier influences from Japanese architecture and utilizes an open floor plan and materials found in the Northwest such as cedar wood and locally-found stones including granite and basalt.

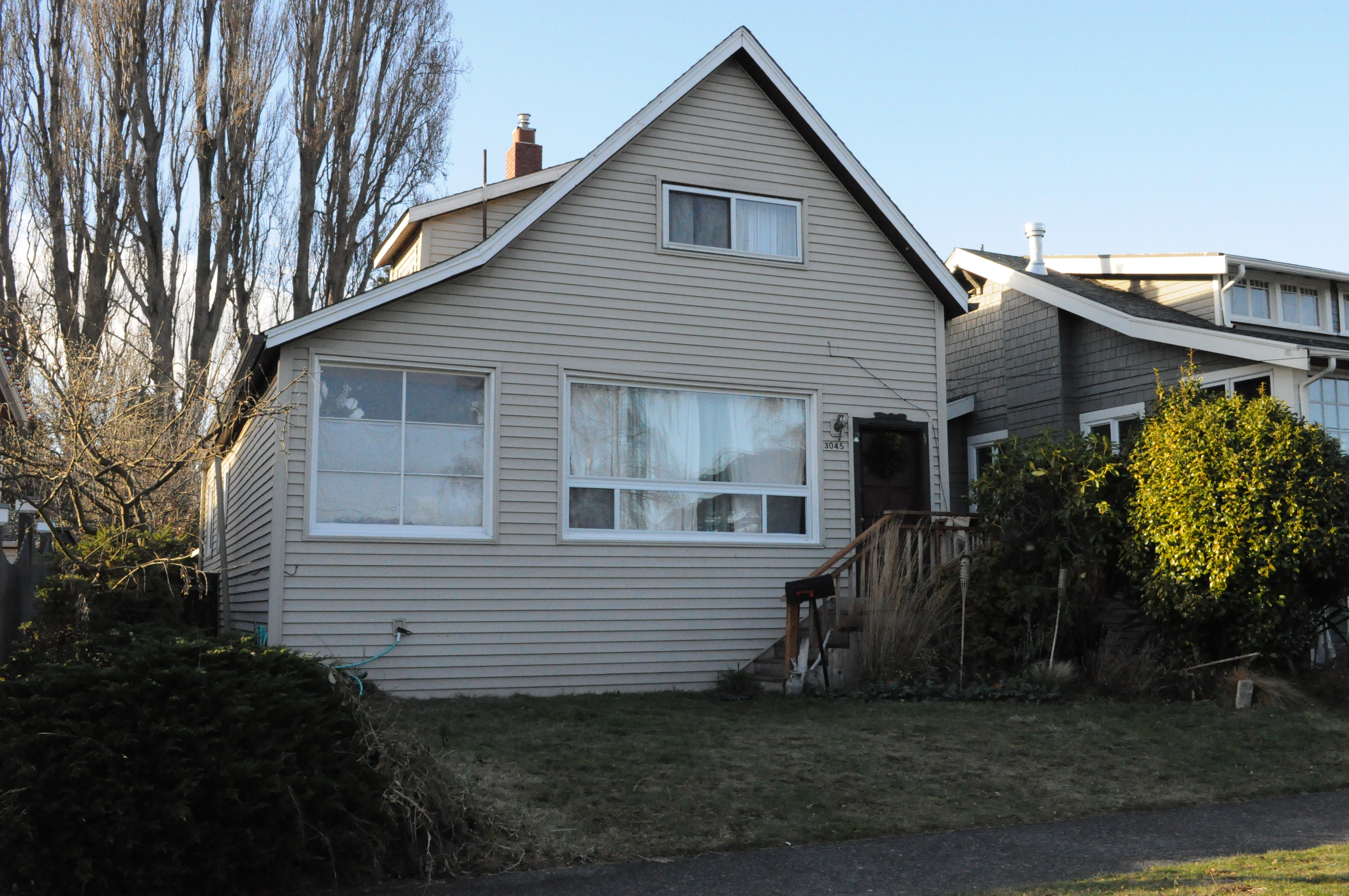
Although much altered, 3045 64th Ave SW in the Alki neighborhood is almost certainly Seattle's oldest residential building. It is believed to have been built by Doc Maynard in 1860.

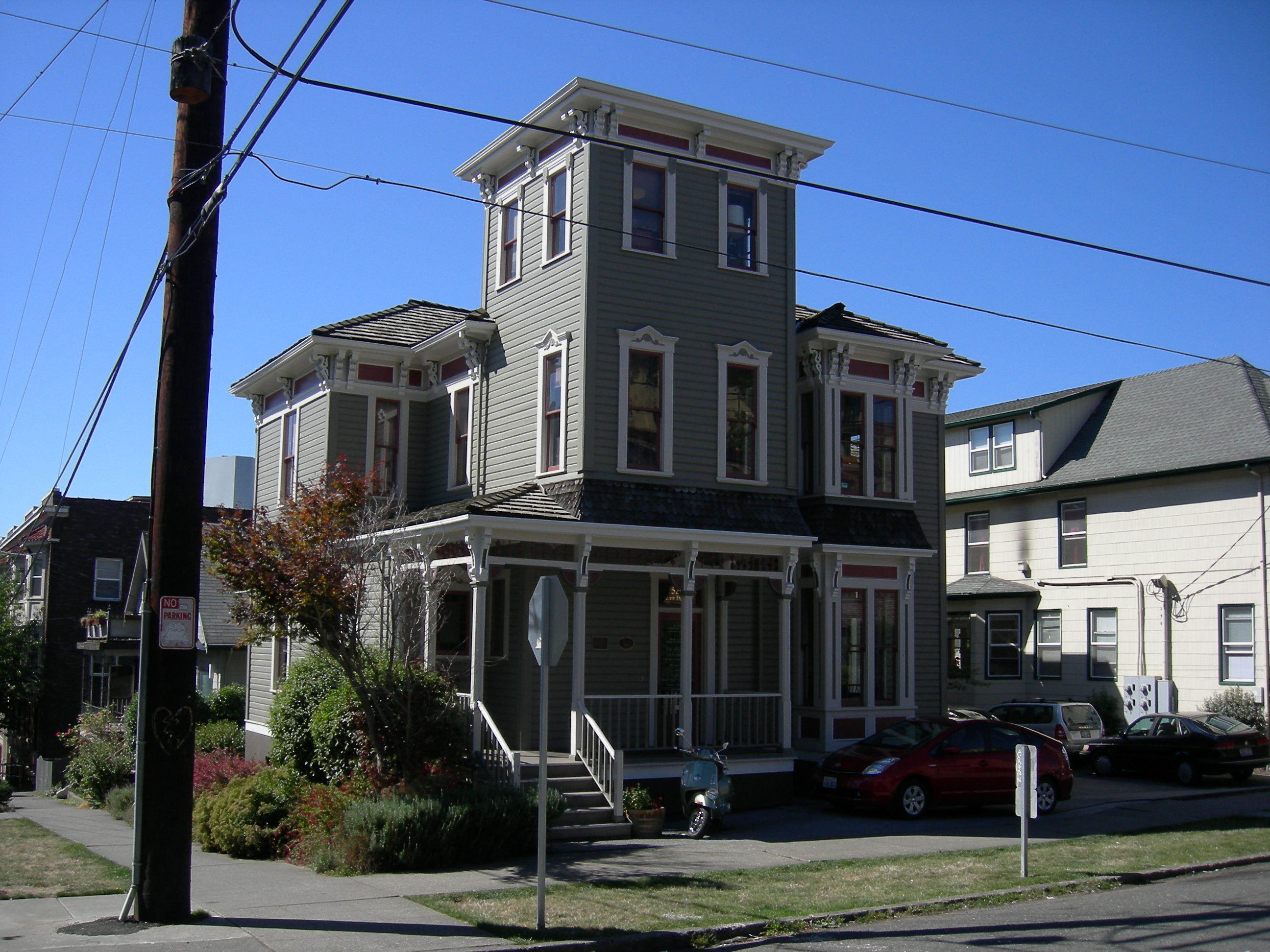
The Italianate Ward House (520 E Denny Way) was built in 1882 at 1025 Pike Street on First Hill, then rotated to face Boren Avenue as 1427 Boren Avenue, and moved to its current Capitol Hill location in 1986, but the exterior is otherwise very little altered.

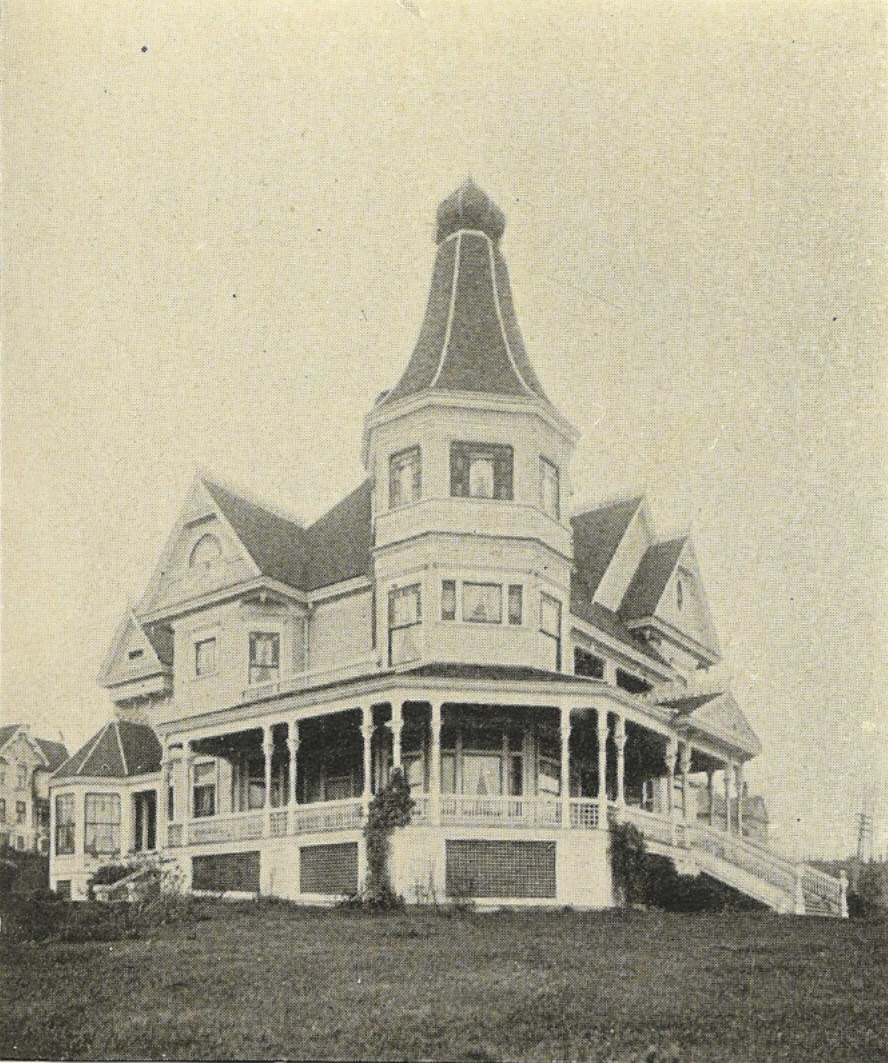
The George Kinnear house, 809 Queen Anne Avenue N, a Queen Anne built in 1888 on the lower part of Queen Anne Hill, demolished in 1958 to make way for the Bayview Manor retirement community.

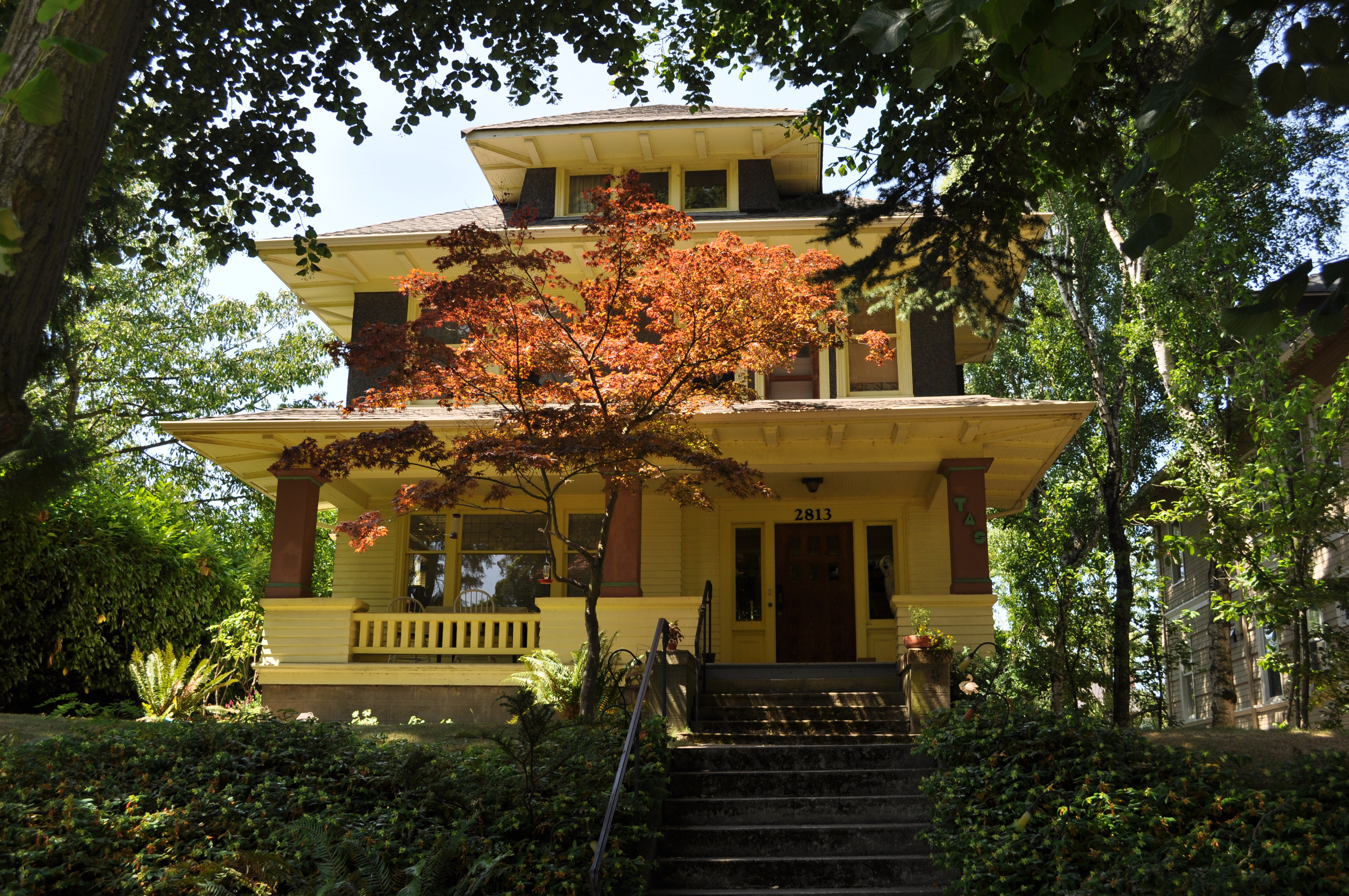
The Wilson-Franklin House, 2813 Broadway E in the Roanoke Park Historic District, built in 1910 by C.L. Martin, is a typical American Foursquare.

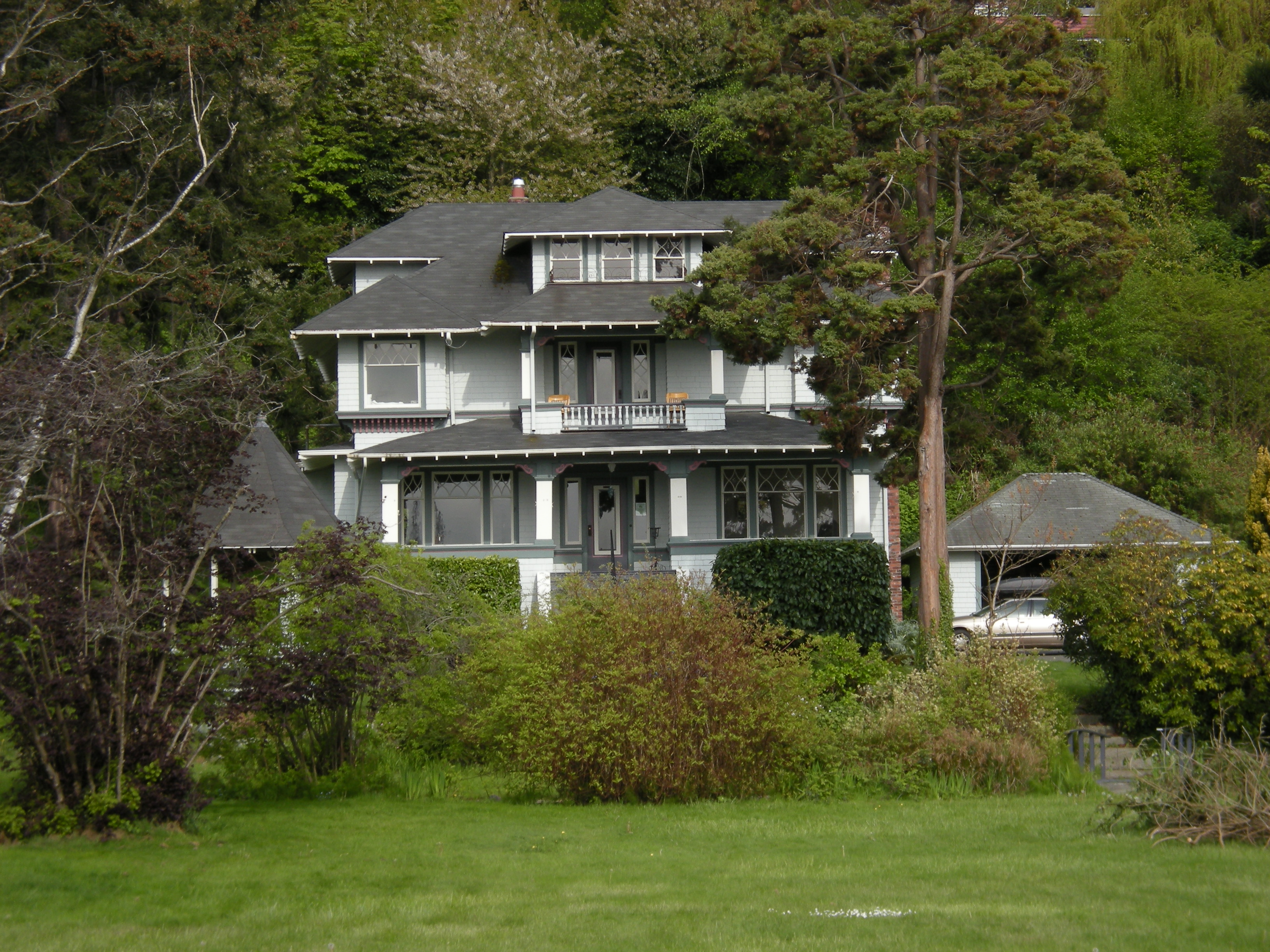
The Satterlee House (1906) at 4866 Beach Drive SW in West Seattle, one of the grander examples of the Foursquare or Box style

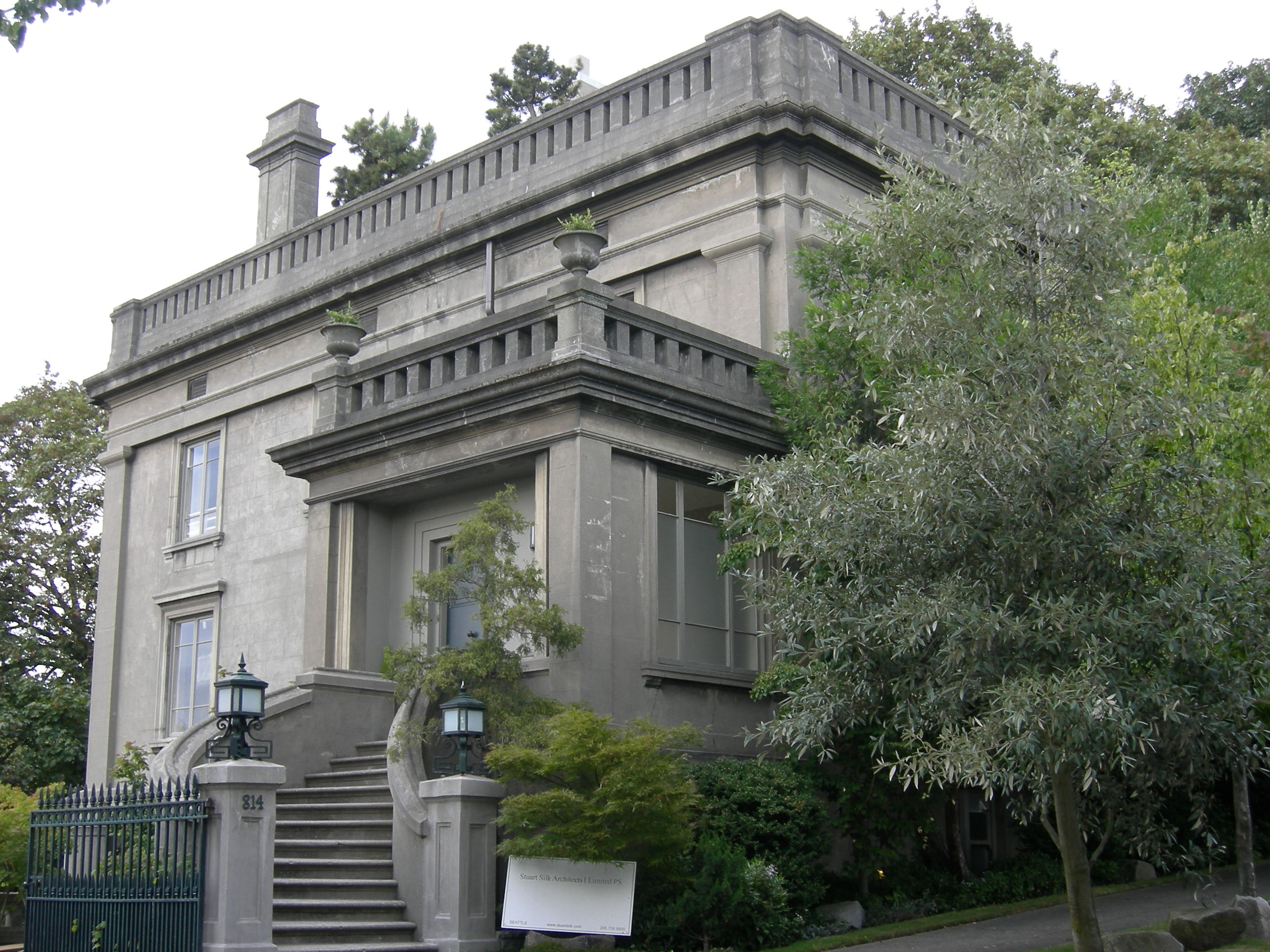
The 1910 home of Samuel Hill (814 E Highland Drive on Capitol Hill), designed by Hill in collaboration with Hornblower & Marshall, is an early example of concrete construction.

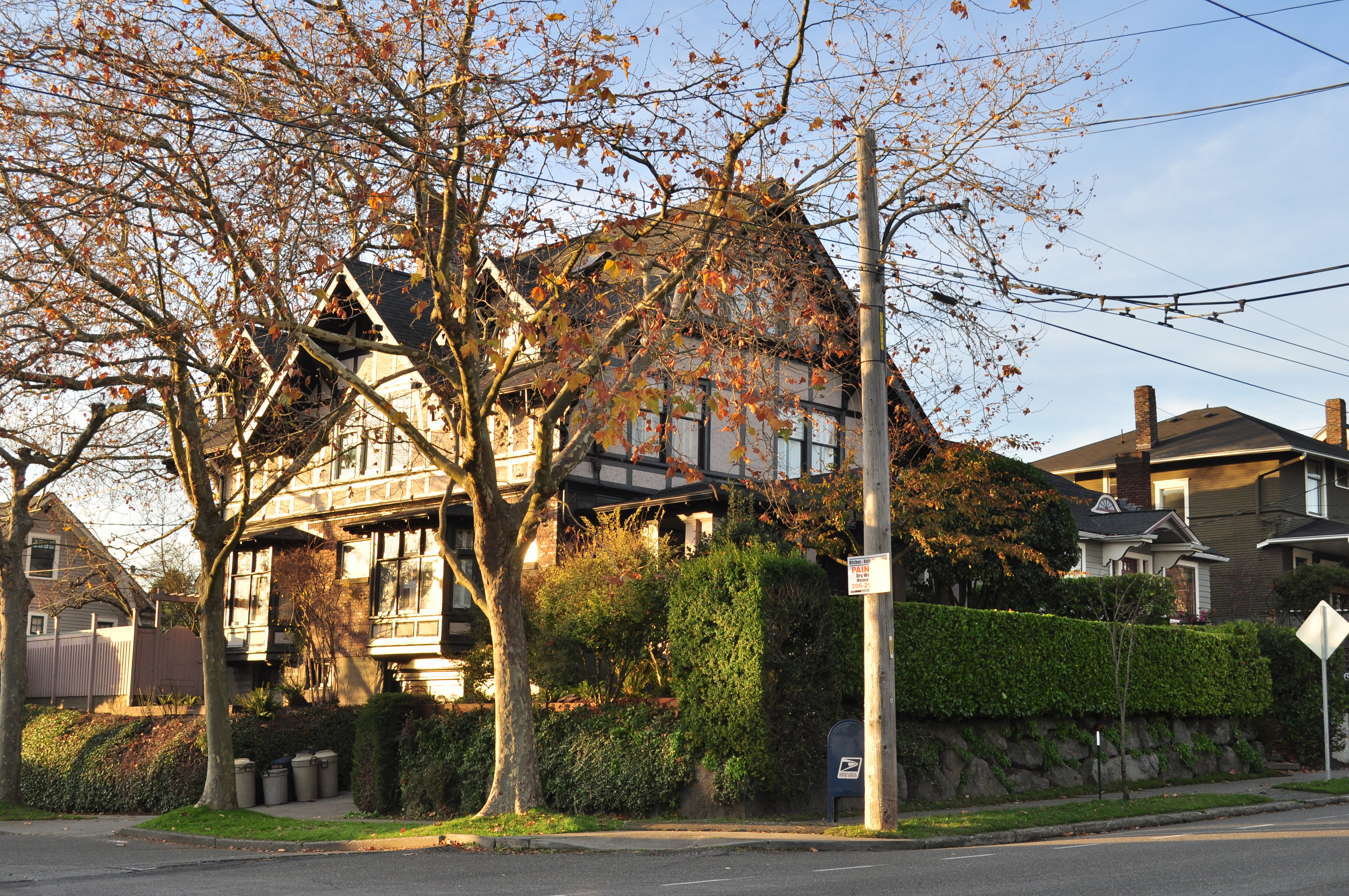
2121 31st Avenue S in the Mount Baker neighborhood, a blend of Tudor and Craftsman styles, built 1910 as a home for developer Charles P. Dose, who platted this area of the city.

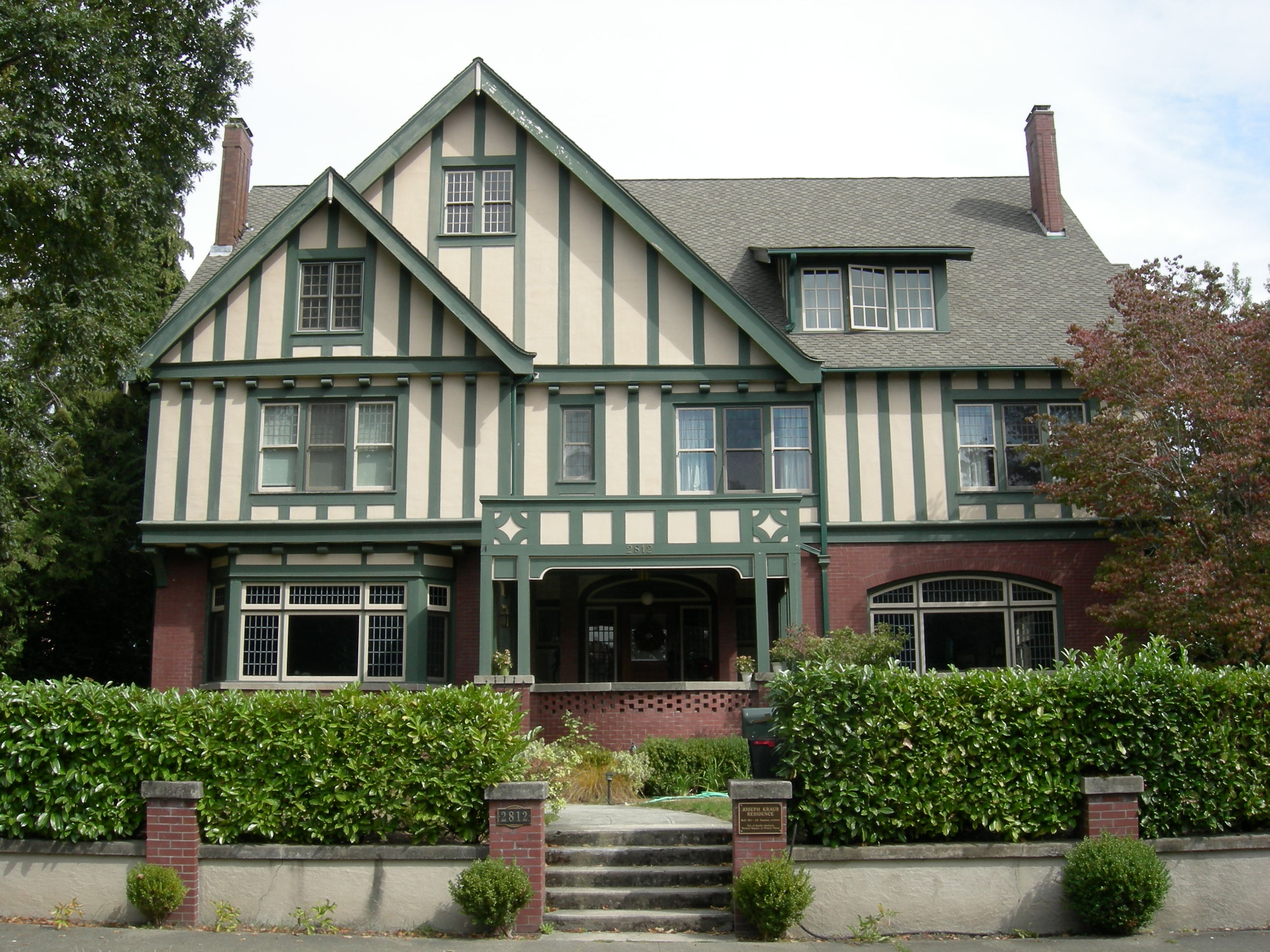
Another Mount Baker neighborhood Tudor, the 1911 Joseph Kraus Residence, 2812 Mt. St. Helens Place S, designed by J.E. Douglass.

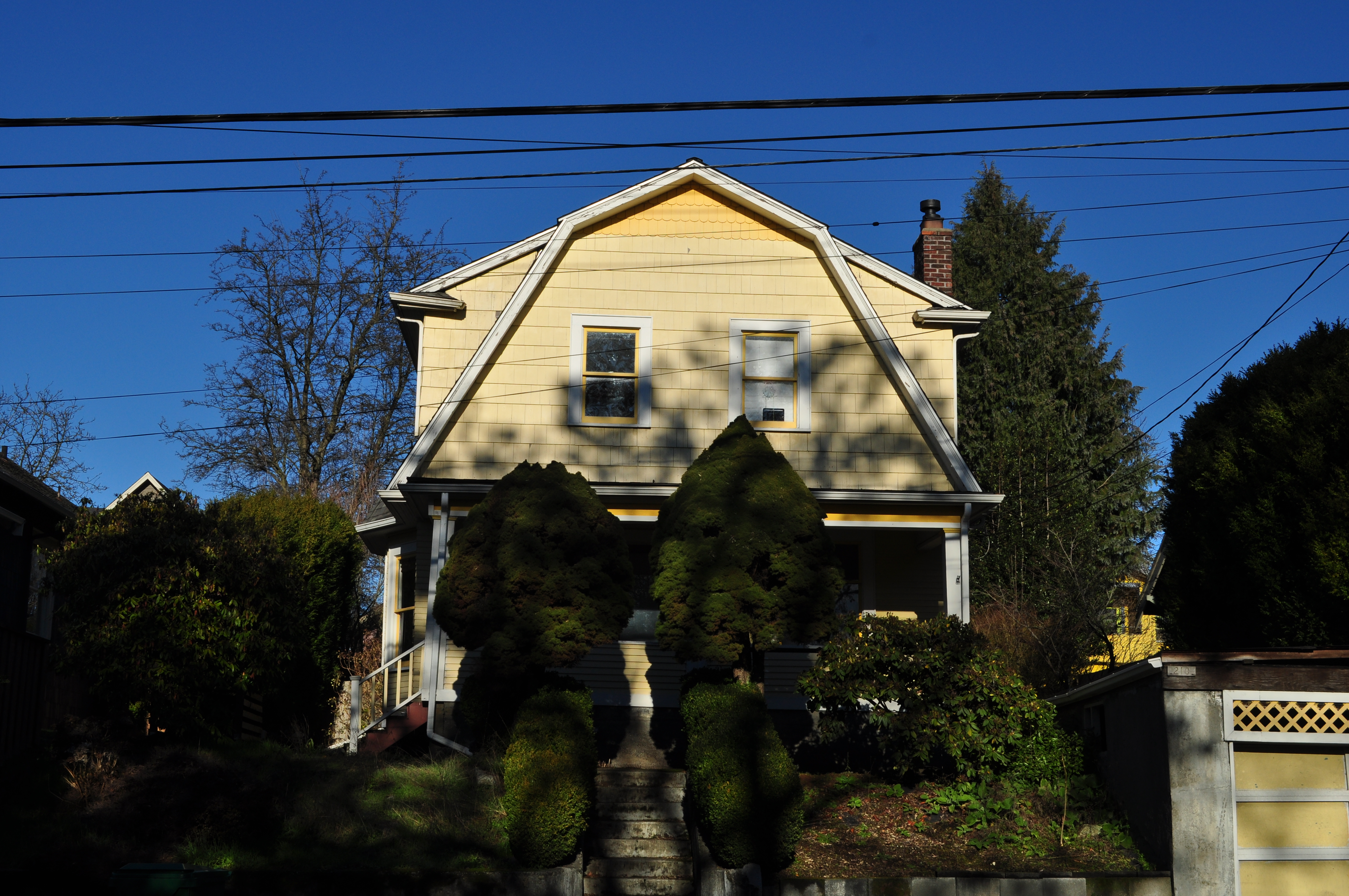
210 NE 50th Street in the Wallingford neighborhood, with the gambrel roofline typical of the Dutch Colonial style.

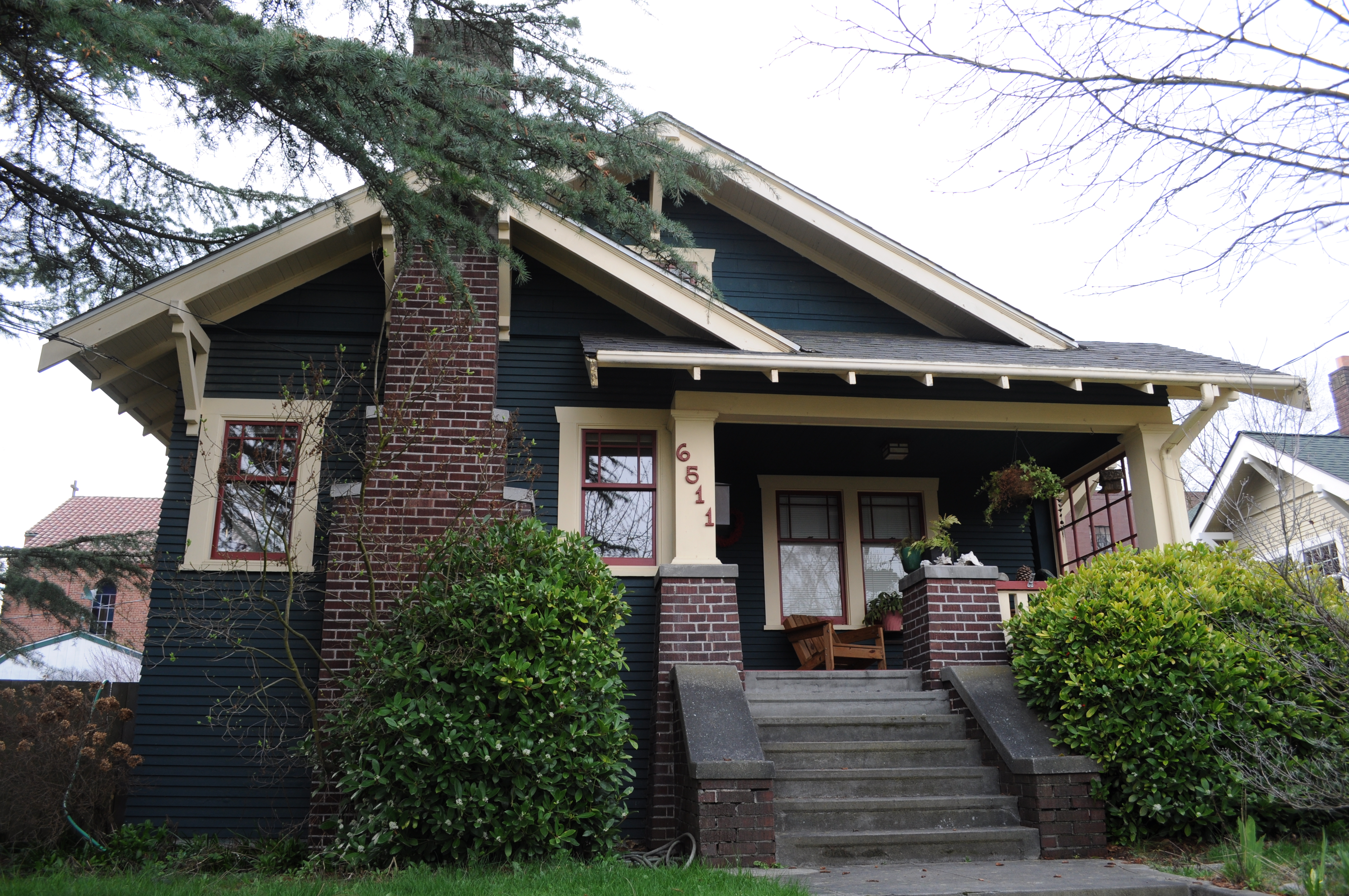
6511 23rd Avenue NW in the Ballard neighborhood, a California bungalow in the American Craftsman style.

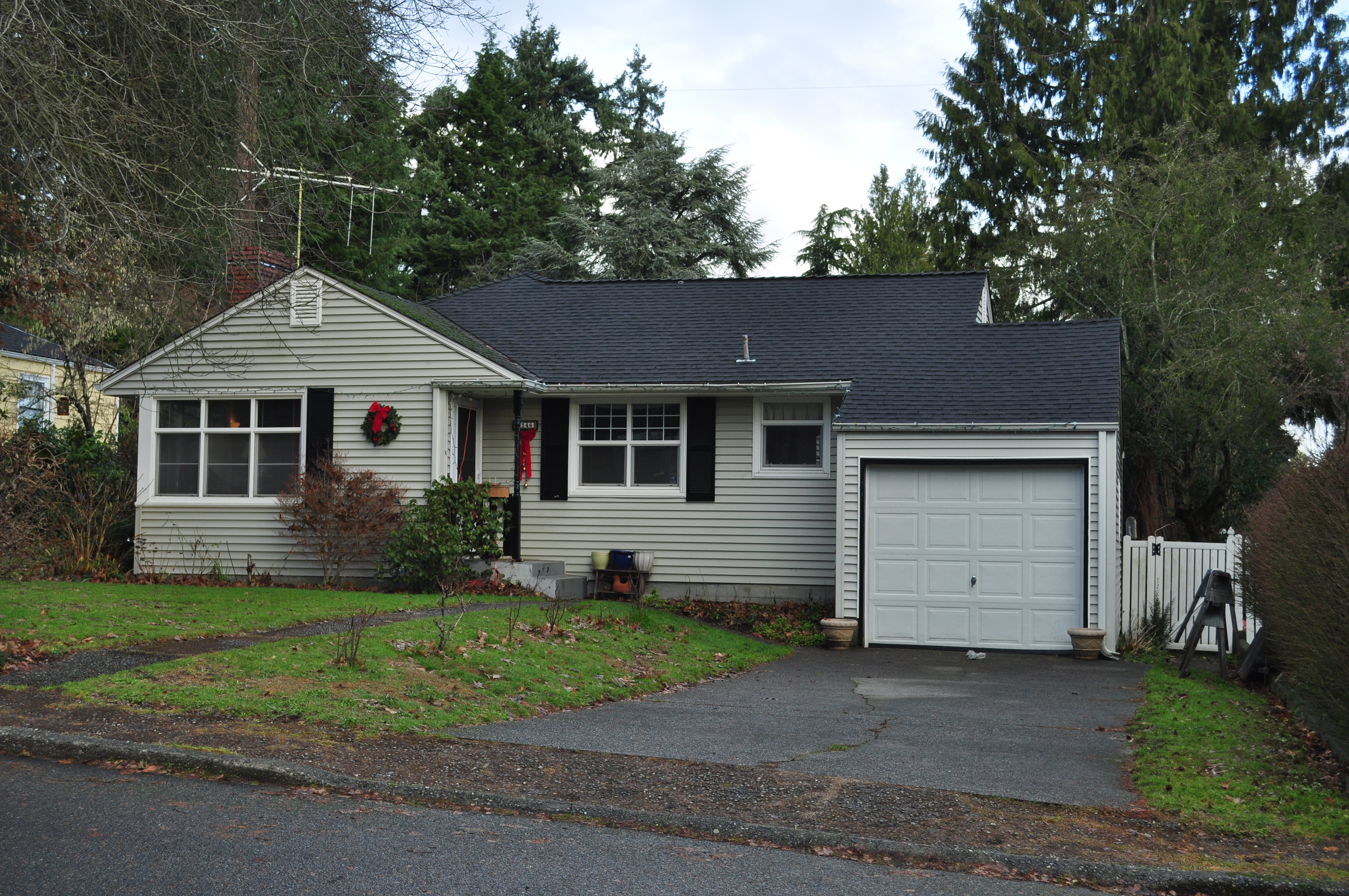
3146 NE 83rd Street in the Wedgwood neighborhood, a typical Cape Cod with attached garage.

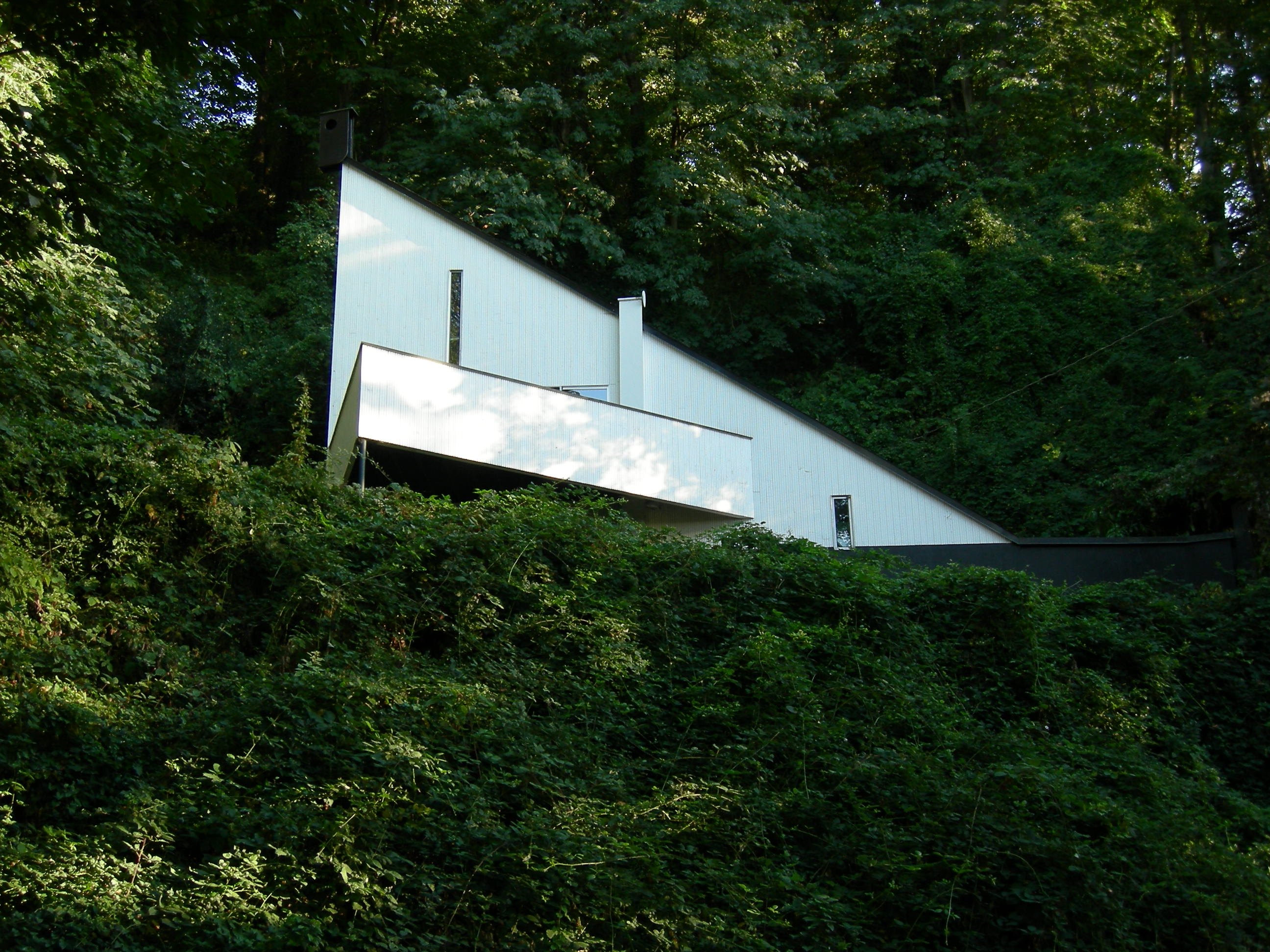
Egan House, designed by architect Robert Reichert for Admiral Willard Egan and built 1957–1959 on the west side of Capitol Hill below St. Mark's Cathedral is the youngest building in the portfolio of Historic Seattle.

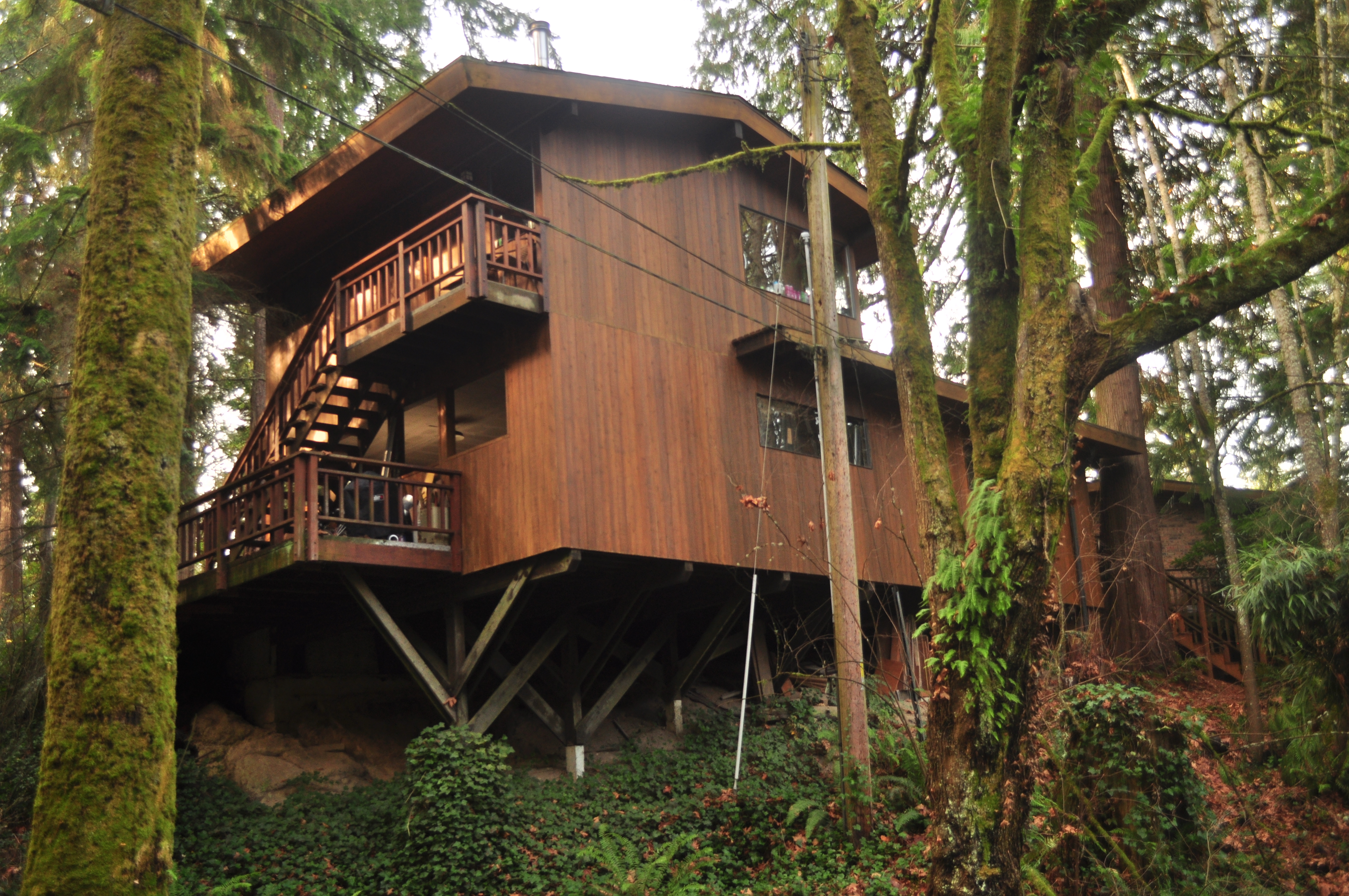
9015 42nd Ave NE; like the Egan House, an example of Northwest Regional style.

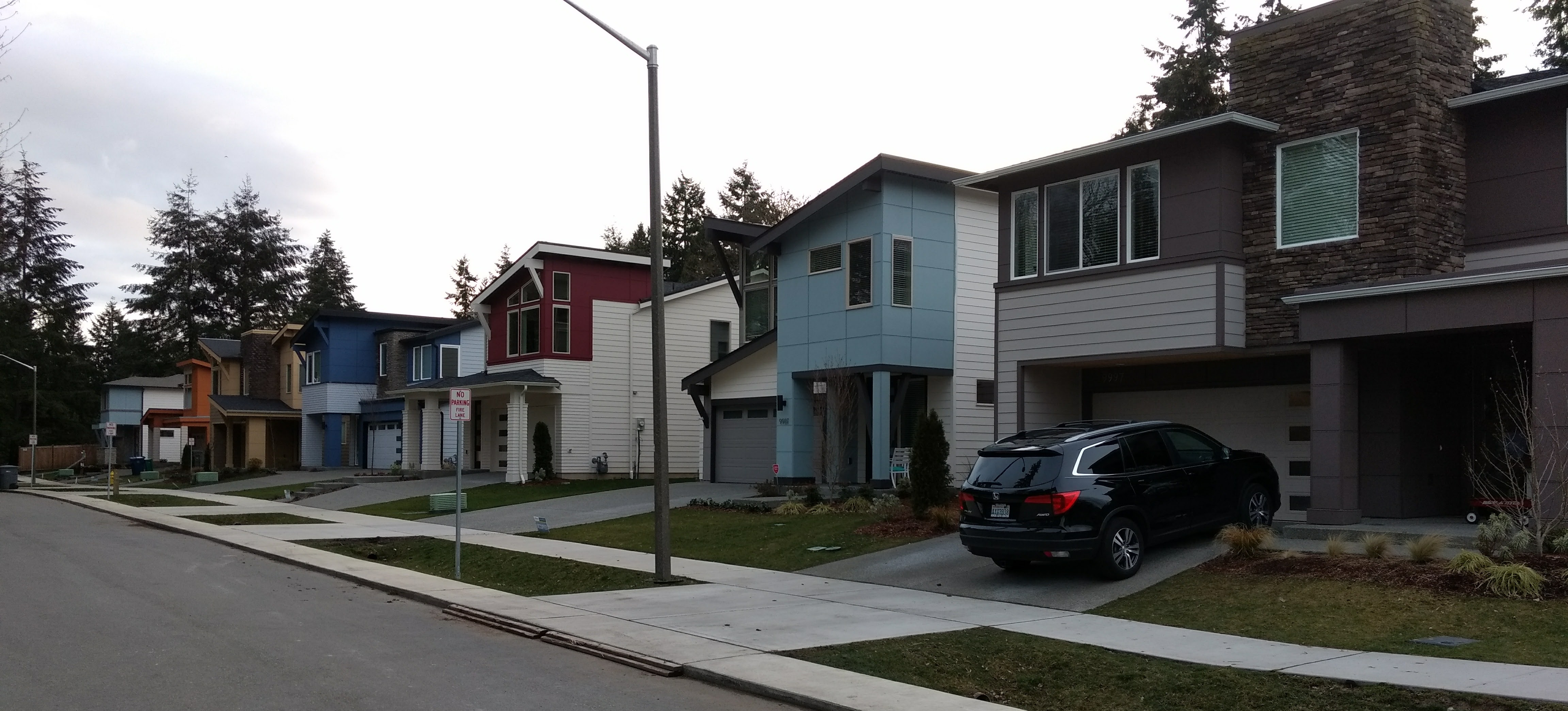
A Northwest Contemporary style housing development in suburban Redmond, Washington.

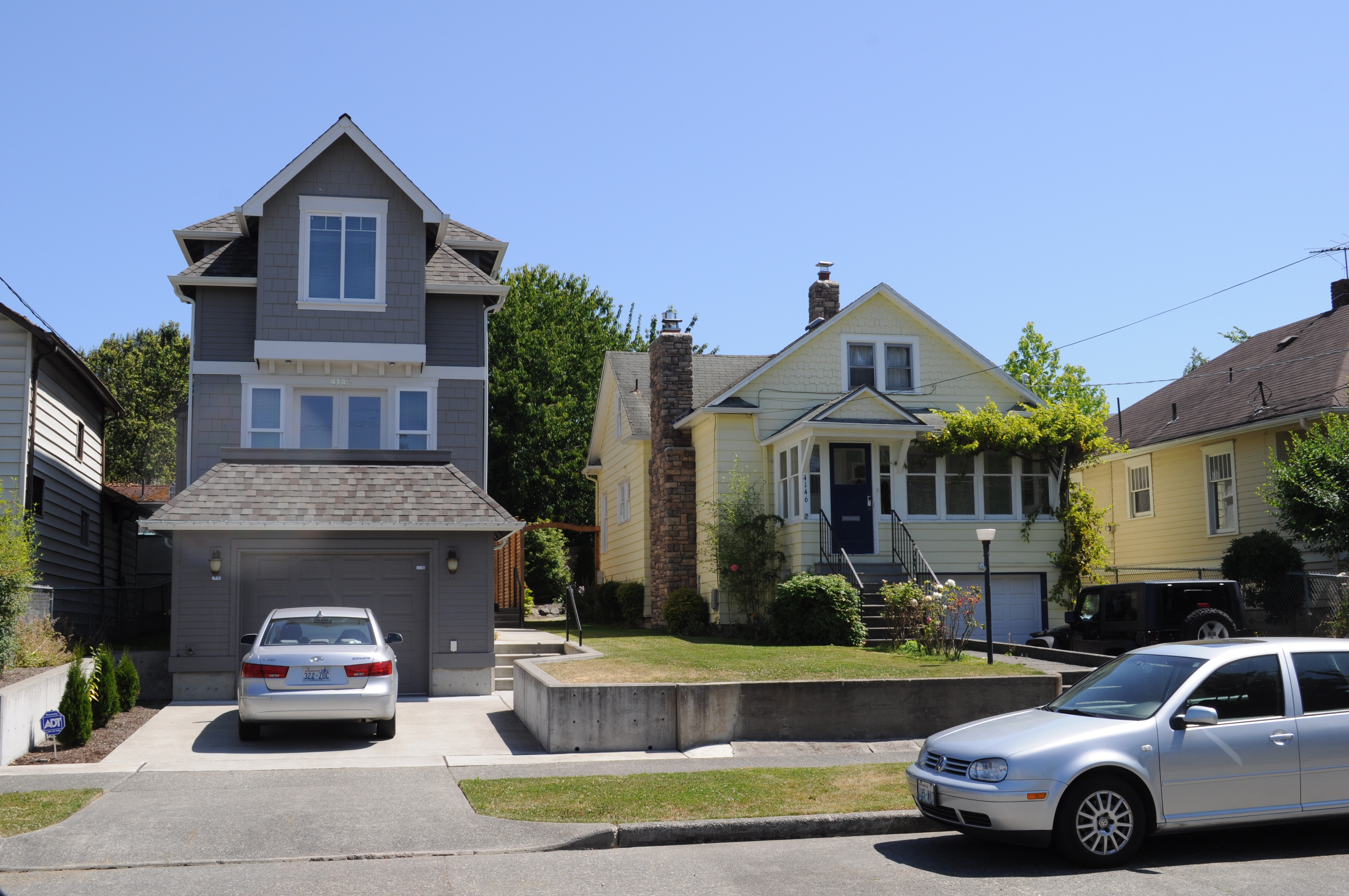
The Northwest Contemporary house at 4142 20th Avenue SW in the Pigeon Point neighborhood (left) was built in 2007 in the space that was formerly the garage of neighboring 4146 20th Avenue SW (right).

=== Apartment buildings ===
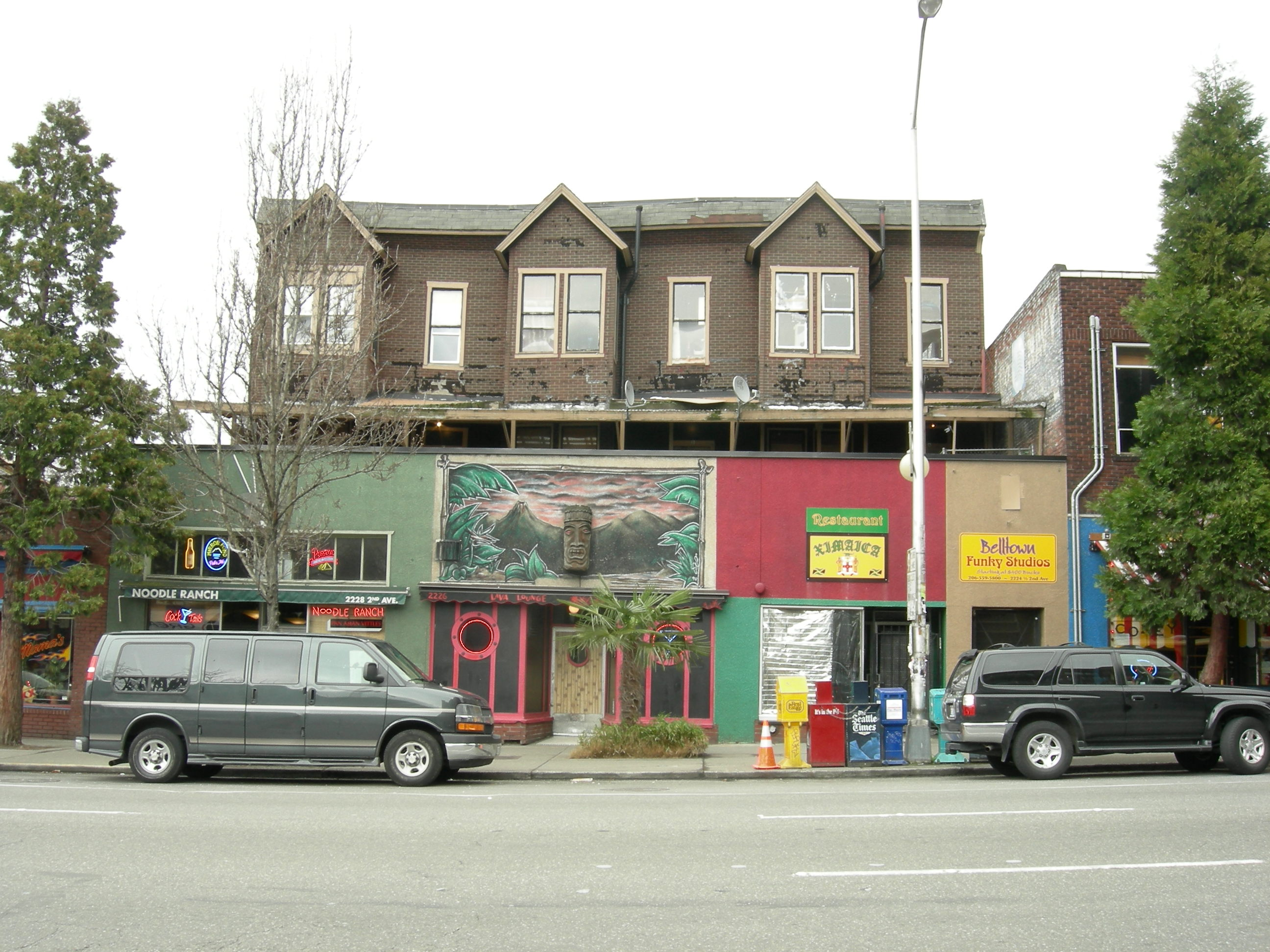
The Wayne Apartments in Belltown (built c. 1890; the storefronts date from 1911), among Seattle's oldest surviving multi-unit dwellings. Always working-class housing, was given Landmark status in 2015 despite its quite deteriorated condition. Nonetheless, no controls were ever put in place and after a fire in June 2022 it was demolished in August 2022.

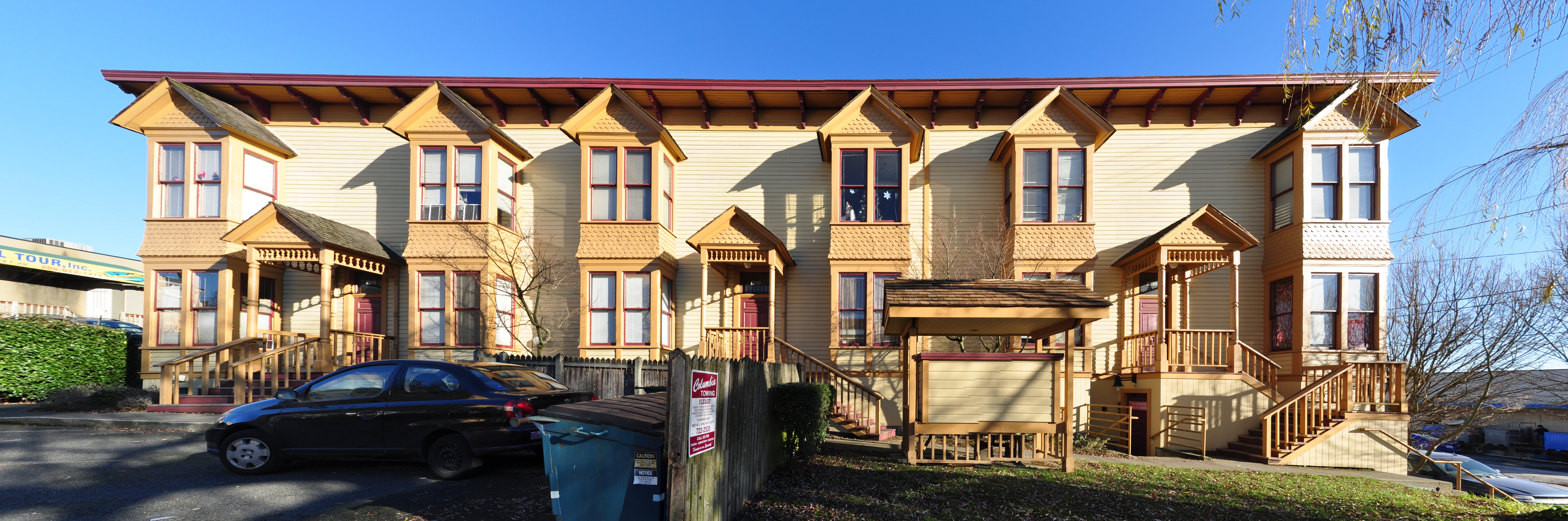
The Victorian Row Apartments in the International District, built 1891, moved in 1909 during the Jackson Street Regrade, and rehabilitated 1992–1993, constitutes Seattle's only remaining structurally unaltered 19th-century apartment building.

Seattle residents in the early years of European-American settlement lived either in private houses, boarding houses, lodging houses (like boarding houses, but without the provision of meals), or generally modest residential hotels. The last of these arrangements began to evolve into apartments houses in the late 19th century, with many of the apartment buildings located near streetcar lines. Seattle has very few remaining 19th-century apartment buildings. Two with city landmark status are the Victorian Row Apartments, 1234 South King Street on the border of the International District and Central District and the Wayne Apartments in Belltown. Victorian Row was built in 1891 on a site near its current location, moved in 1909 during the Jackson Street Regrade, and rehabilitated 1992–1993, constitutes Seattle's only remaining structurally unaltered 19th-century apartment building. The Wayne Apartments, originally three row houses, is probably best known for the bars along Second Avenue in a 1911 extension of the building toward the street. The three two-story attached wood-frame rowhouses were constructed some time between 1888 and 1893, and were representative of "a once-common but now extremely rare rowhouse building form in Seattle." Around 1906 the neighborhood was the subject of one of Seattle's many regrades. By 1911, the old buildings had been divided into apartments. They were raised to become the upper stories of a building with commercial buildings at street level, constituting a "regrade hybrid," common both here in the Denny Regrade and in the regraded portions of the International District. An apartment building dating from 1903, somewhat structurally similar to the Wayne Apartments, and similarly raised in 1911 to add a commercial ground floor, stood at the northeast corner of 12th Avenue East and East Pike Street on Capitol Hill until it was demolished in 2014.

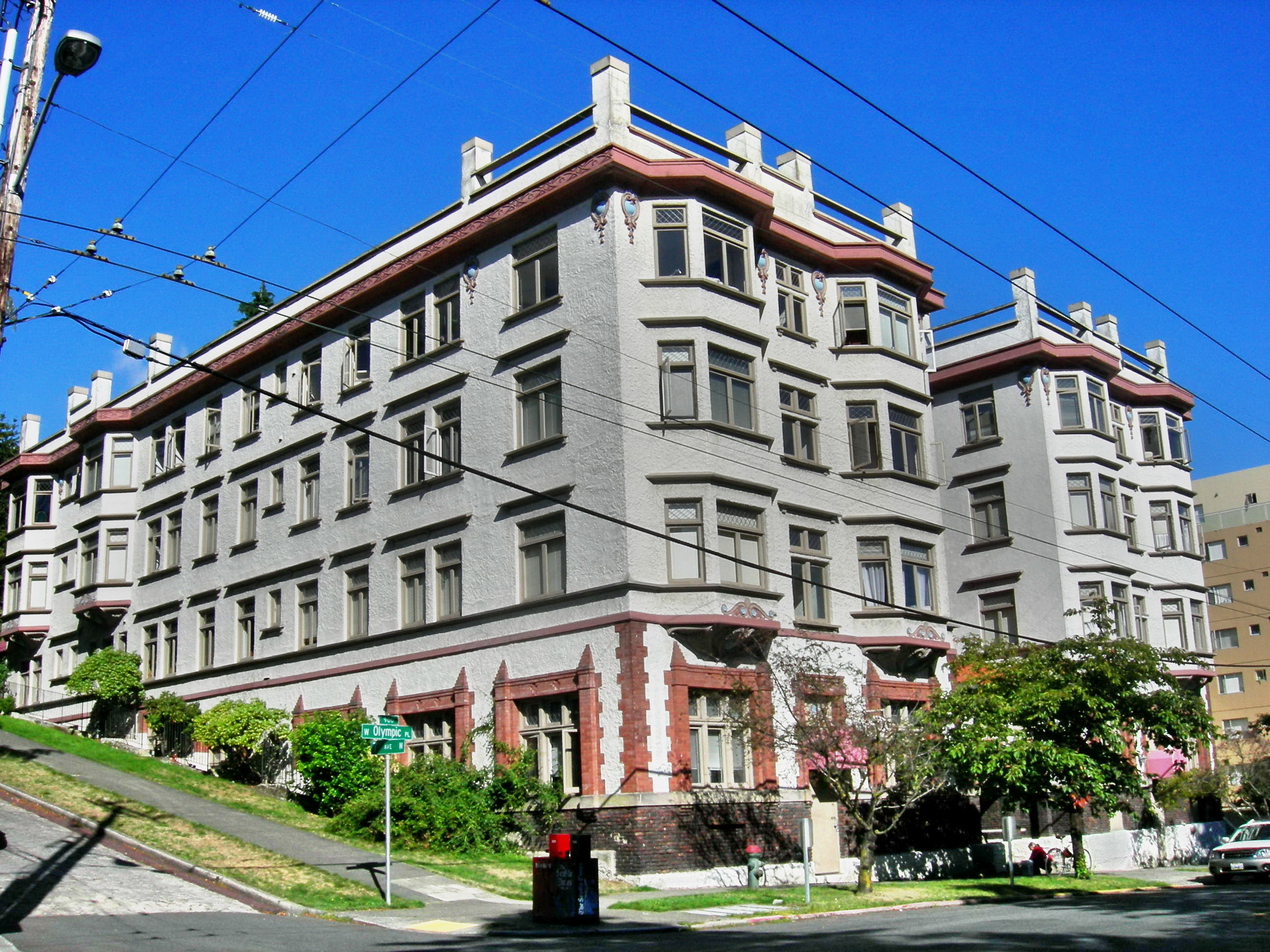
The Chelsea, near Kinnear Park on Queen Anne Hill was designed by Harlan Thomas and opened as a hotel in 1907; it became increasingly residential, and by 1917 was simply an apartment building.

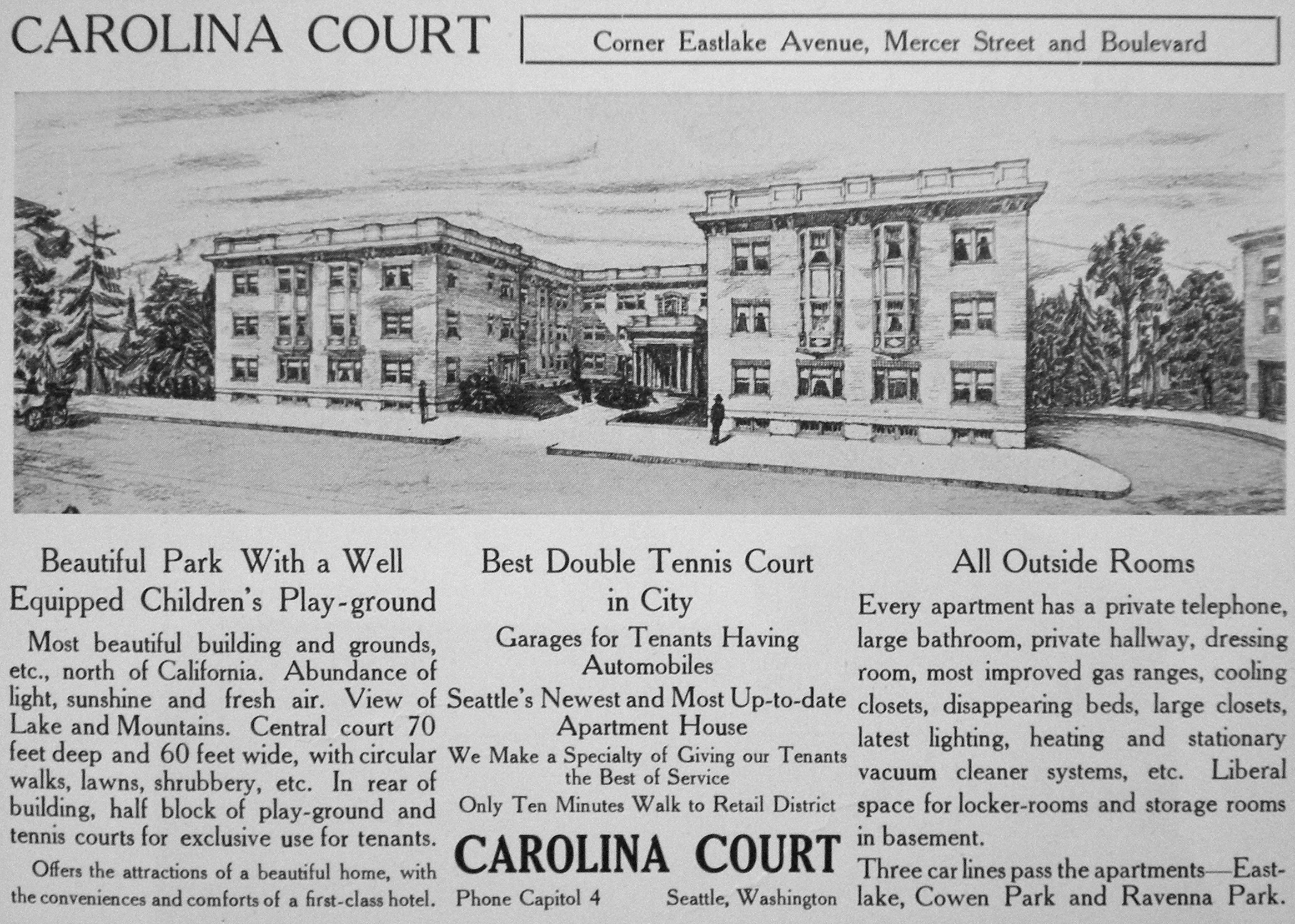
A 1916 ad promotes the then-new Carolina Court on Eastlake Avenue in the Cascade neighborhood

Around 1910 Seattle began to see apartment buildings for a wealthier clientele. On Capitol Hill, apartments from the 1910s advertised such features as private baths, gas ranges, refrigerators, telephones, bay windows, hardwood floors, built-in cabinetry, leaded and/or beveled glass, and entry through a marble-floored lobby. The Bamberg (1910), still standing at 416 E Roy Street on Capitol Hill, was designed by architect John Corrigan for brick contractor Charles H. Bamberg. The Seattle Department of Neighborhoods notes that this building of fourteen four-room apartments, with deep eaves and recessed balconies, provides a "good example of the elegant materials and design used to help many apartments blend in to the areas that were primarily single family at the time they were built." The Phoenix (535 20th Avenue East) even offered some apartments with 18 feet (5.5 m) ceilings. Closer to the center of town, where Olive Way curves up from downtown near present-day Interstate 5, are more modest apartment buildings such as the brick-and-clapboard Celeste (1906) at East Olive Place & Melrose, the Lauren Renee (1912, John Creutzer) to its immediate east, and around the corner on Bellevue Avenue the Bel Fiore (1907, Henderson Ryan) with its arched recessed entry. Nearby, the 6-story Biltmore (1924, Stuart & Wheatley) tried to mix economy and luxury. Most of its 125 apartments were (and are) small "studio apartments" with no separate bedroom, but some apartments were considerably larger, and the building features an elegant Tudor Gothic design, a marble and mahogany lobby, and originally included a tea room and had a full staff more typical of a luxury building. Further north, where the west side of Capitol Hill becomes a near-cliff with views across Lake Union to Queen Anne Hill, are view buildings such as the Ben Lomond (1910, Ellsworth Green), "[s]queezed onto a site that appears unbuildable," with 24 large apartments, designed with a children's playhouse on the roof rather than a penthouse apartment; the Roundcliffe (1925, Stuart & Wheatley); and the Belroy (1931, William Bain, Sr. & Lionel Pries), as "bold" in its Art Deco design as in being a luxury building built during the Great Depression. After the construction of Interstate 5 in the early 1960s, numerous properties in between these two areas were redeveloped as apartment buildings with panoramic views, despite freeway noise and pollution. Victor Steinbrueck wrote in 1973, "The architecture of the various apartments is neither generally harmonious nor of high quality, but these do form an interesting, variegated, architectural wall above the roadways."

In the same era as apartments began to be built on Capitol Hill, the mansions of First Hill began to give way to duplexes, row houses, and apartment buildings, with one of the first apartment buildings being the still-extant Mission-style San Marco at 1205 Spring Street (Saunders and Lawton, completed 1905). Even older is the St. Paul (1901, Spalding & Russell) at 1302-08 Seneca Street, "Seattle's first multifamily dwelling to qualify as a purpose-built apartment building," with three separate lobbies. Although St. Paul's eighteen spacious apartments with 10-foot (3.0 m) ceilings survive to this day, the building has lost almost all of its exterior architectural details.

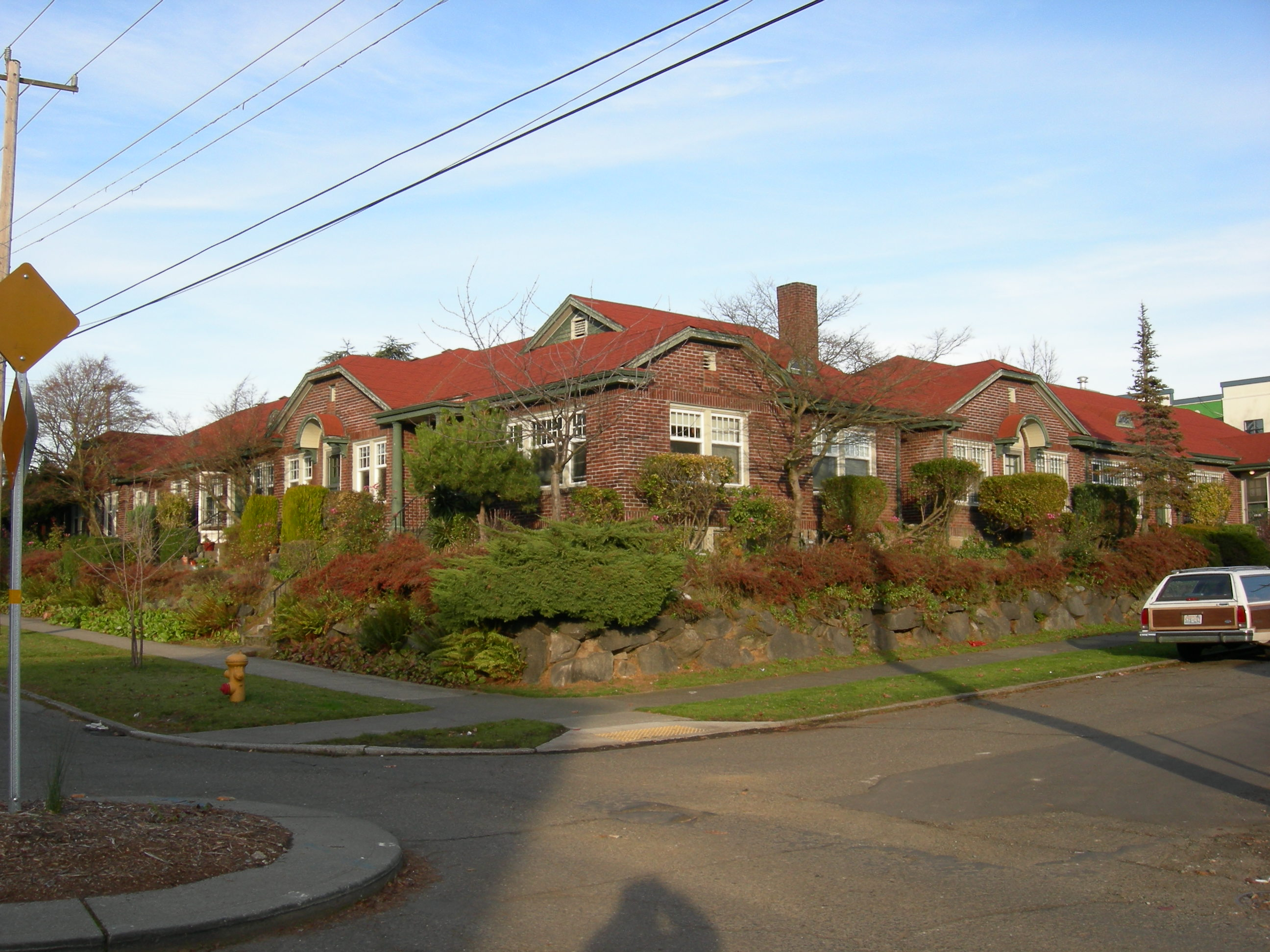
Garden apartments at 18th Avenue and E. Spruce Street, built 1924.

Further east, a bit farther from the city center along the Madison Street cable car line in then-suburban Renton Hill, William P. White built the six-story Olympian Apartments (1913) on an unusual five-sided lot with views of both Lake Washington and Puget Sound. The Beaux Arts exterior made extensive use of decorative terra cotta; the building featured an elevator, dumbwaiters, a main staircase, and a separate service staircase, and was one of Seattle's first apartment buildings to feature a basement garage. Five apartments on each floor averaged 1,275 square feet (118.5 m^{2}). Besides a parlor and a kitchen, two of the five apartments on each floor had a bedrooms and a maid's room (vs. two bedrooms and no maid's room for the other units), though the 1920 census shows that only a few of the ostensible maid's rooms were actually used for that purpose, and several apartments housed either extended families or groups of unrelated adults.

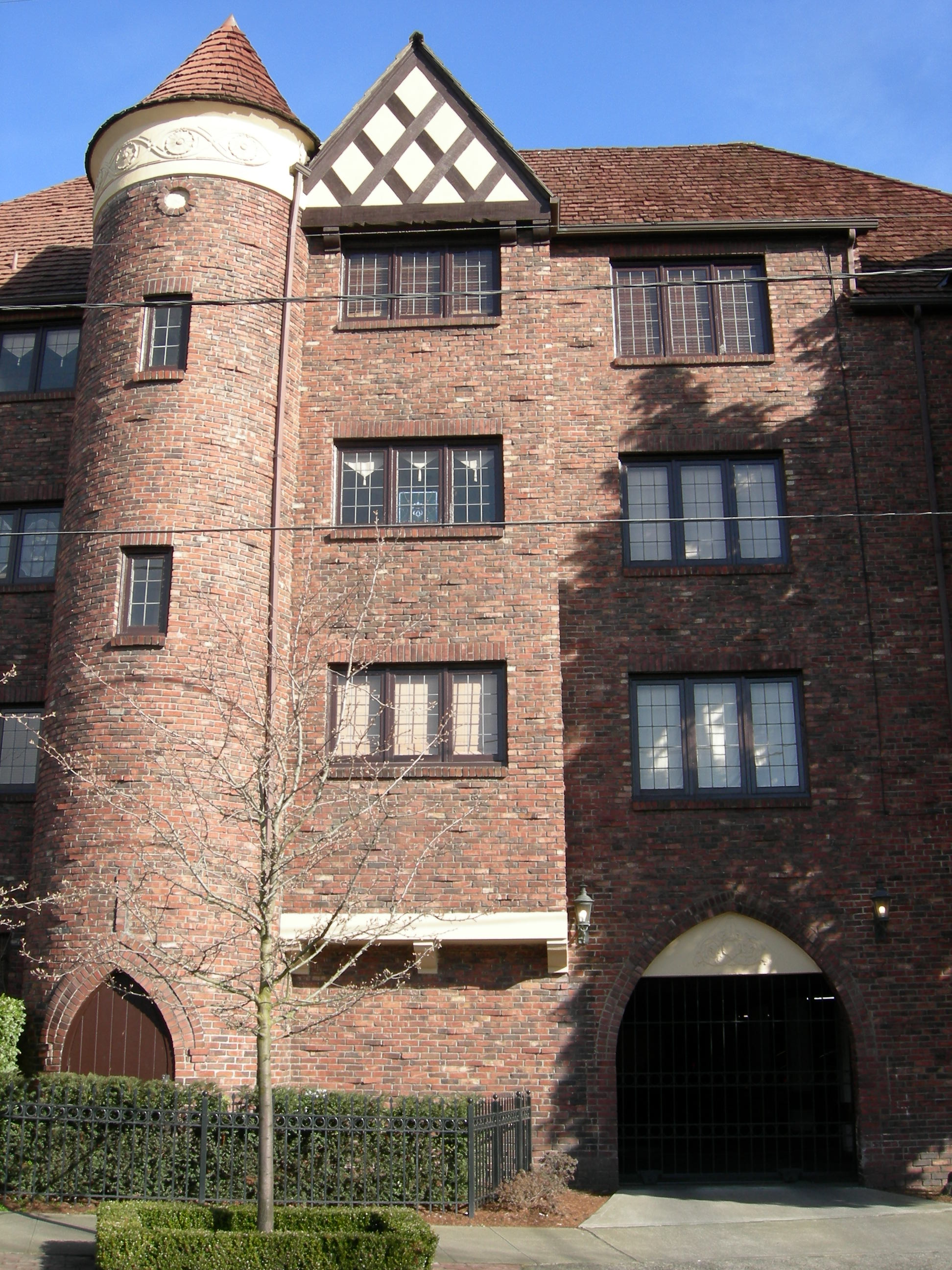
1005 E. Roy on Capitol Hill, one of many Seattle apartment buildings by master builder Frederick Anhalt.

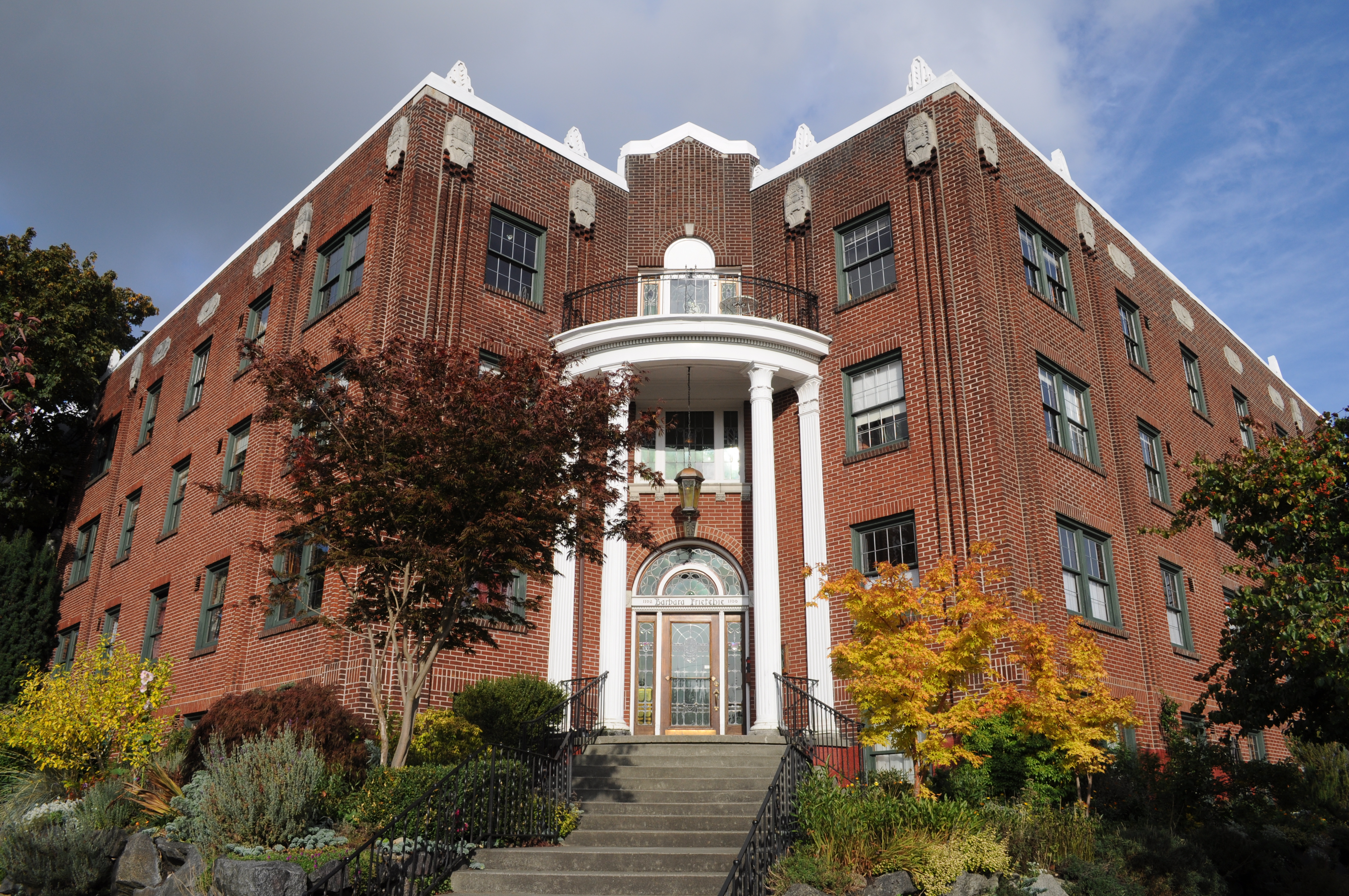
The Barbara Frietchie in the International Village, built 1929, combines Colonial Revival with Zig Zag Moderne.

Puget Sound was a major shipbuilding center, and apartment construction boomed along with the rest of Seattle's economy through World War I, but with the end of the war came a downturn. Another building boom late in the 1920s brought yet more apartment buildings to First Hill. The 12-story Spring Apartments at 1223 Spring Street (built 1929) were among several designed by Earle W. Morrison. With a brick veneer, a red tile roof, and terracotta details, the building has only two apartments per floor, and a 13-room penthouse on the top floor, with terraces. The design featured fireplaces, foyers, reception rooms, tiled kitchens and baths, servants' quarters, electric clothes dryers (something of a novelty at the time) and a separate service elevator. Nearby at 1215 Seneca Street, the L-shaped Spanish Colonial Revival-style building now known as the Tuscany Apartments was built in 1928 as the Piedmont Apartment Hotel, with 30 apartments and 112 hotel rooms. In 1963 the building was purchased by the Salvation Army and operated as the Evangeline Young Women's Residence, before eventually being rehabilitated again as apartments. The hotel dining room survives and is used by the Northwest School. Its New-York-born architect Daniel Huntington practiced briefly in Denver before his distinguished career in Seattle. As City of Seattle Architect (1912-1921) he designed the Lake Union Steam Plant and at least ten fire stations and libraries. After leaving his city position, he variously practiced solo and partnered with various prominent architects, including Carl F. Gould and Arthur Loveless. This was also the era of the most prominent Frederick Anhalt buildings discussed above and of International Village, a group of apartment buildings on 17th Avenue just south of Union Street, built (and probably designed) in 1928-29 by developer-builder Samuel Anderson. Although all of the International Village buildings are three-story, 14-to-16-unit rectangular buildings with central entrances and with apartments ranging from 660 square feet (61 m^{2}) to 900 square feet (84 m^{2}), their elaborate façades variously evoke Art Deco, Colonial Revival, Mediterranean Revival, French Provincial and Tudor Revival styles.

Several prominent buildings of this era that are not commonly thought of as apartment buildings nonetheless contain apartments. The four-story auditorium in the Eagles Auditorium Building (Henry Bittman, 1925) was surrounded on three sides by the Senator Apartments; The Paramount Theatre (originally Seattle Theatre, 1928, B. Marcus Priteca et al.) includes the Studio Apartments, an eight-story structure on the Pine Street side, now offices but once home to numerous Seattle musicians and music teachers.

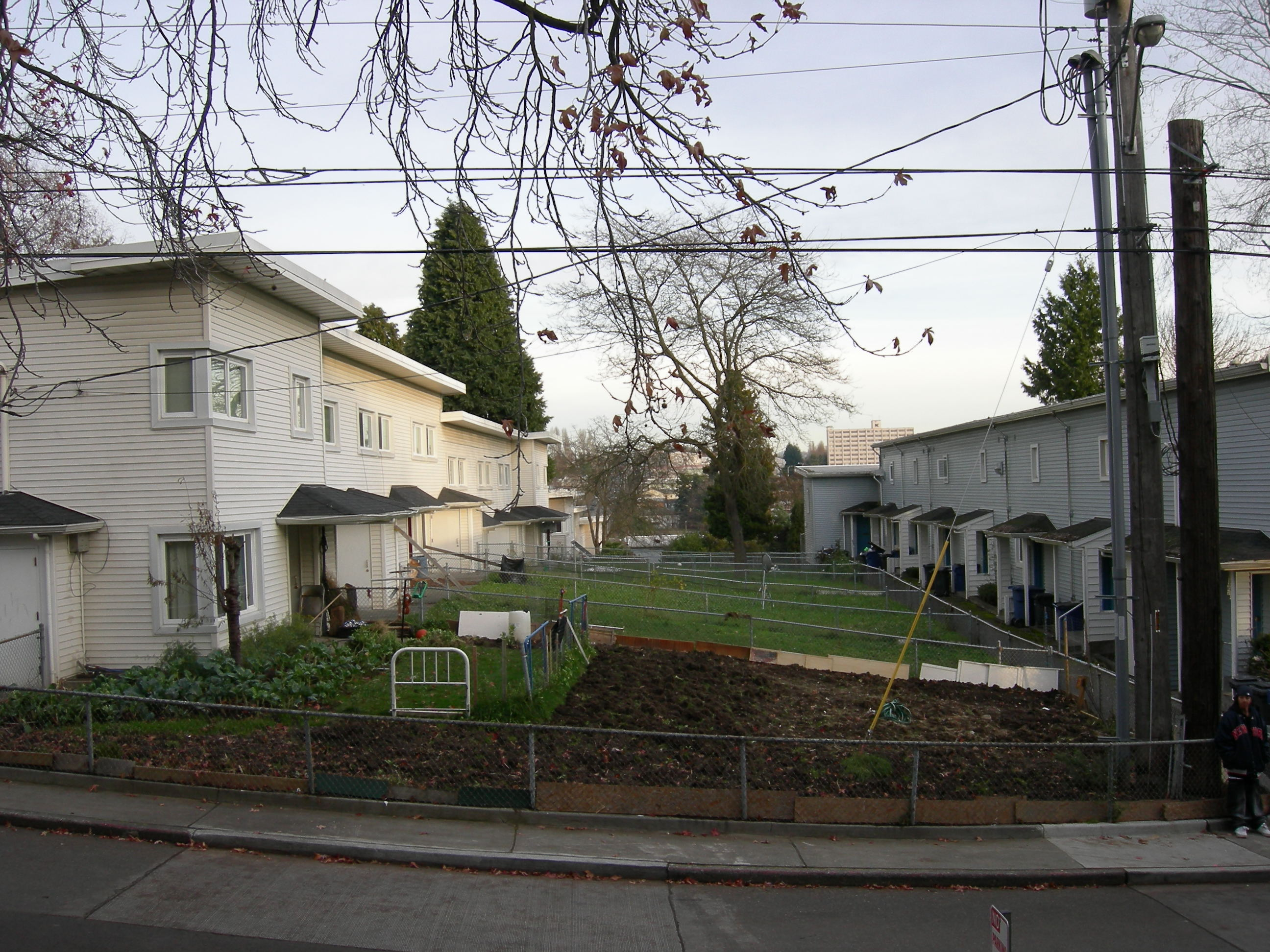
Yesler Terrace (1941), Seattle's first public housing project.

The Great Depression hit Seattle hard, and brought a slowdown in apartment construction, as in most other sectors. However, World War II brought an economic boom, centered this time on airplane manufacture at Boeing on the outskirts of the city. An influx of workers created an increased demand for working class housing. Among the projects that tried to meet this need was the Yesler Terrace public housing development near Downtown, the first project of the Seattle Housing Authority and the first racially integrated public housing project in the United States. Originally covering 22 city blocks, it had 863 dwelling units in 97 multi-family buildings, mostly low-rise garden apartments. The first portion was built before the war as low-income housing; the second, on the same general plans, as housing for defense workers and their families. Around 1960, 25 buildings with 256 units were lost to the construction of Interstate 5, and three more buildings with 25 units were lost to build a community center in 2003. A 2010 landmark nomination states, "Upon its completion, the project was lauded for its progressive social goals and its Modern design." As of 2017, most of the original Yesler Terrace buildings have been demolished, and the area is being converted to mixed use, including mixed-income housing. There is supposed to be no net loss of low-income housing.

Victor Steinbrueck, writing in 1962, criticized the "less-than-luxury" apartments then-recently developed on Capitol Hill, especially those that preceded a 1959 zoning law change. "At first glance, the apartments appear to be consistent with the clean, direct approach associated with contemporary architecture, but... [t]he open outside corridors... pass in front of large 'view' windows in the living rooms of the individual apartments... Most tenants close their blinds and look for another apartment when their lease runs out."

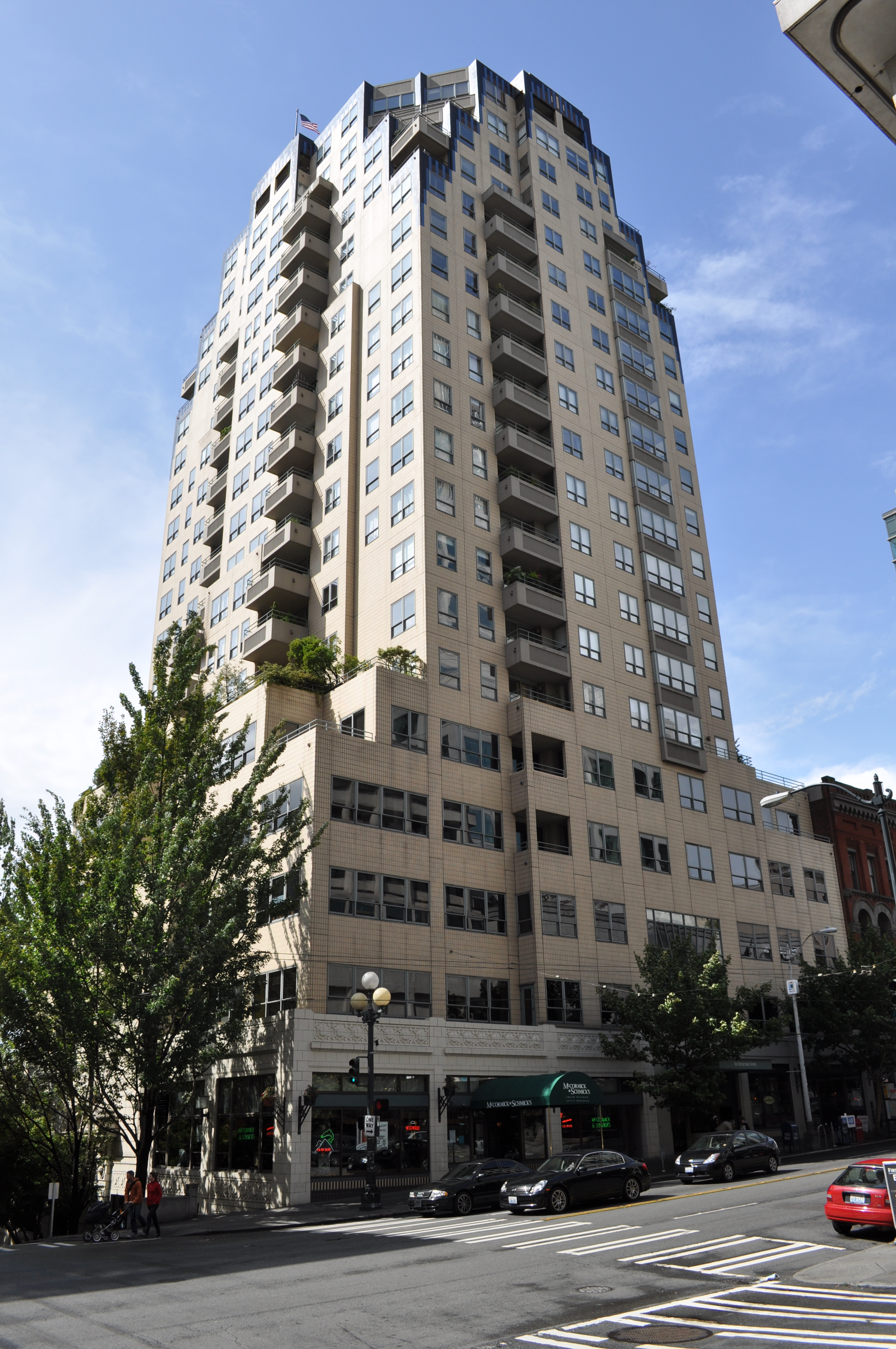
The Watermark Tower, built in 1983 and converted to condominiums in 1987, one of the older Downtown luxury residential tower buildings. The lower portion of the Watermark Tower incorporates the landmarked façade of the Coleman Building, built 1915 on the same site.

There were a number of notable pre-war apartment buildings elsewhere in town, such as the Wilsonian Apartments (Frank Fowler, 1923) in the University District, the Mission-style Friedlander/La Playa Vista (Alban Shay, 1927) at Alki, and numerous buildings on Queen Anne Hill. Downtown and Belltown also saw some construction of apartment buildings in the same era as First and Capitol Hills, but nothing next to what these two neighborhoods, along with Ballard, have seen in recent decades. At the end of 2016, the Seattle Times estimated that there would be 7,400 new apartments in the next two years just in Belltown and nearby South Lake Union, most of them priced as luxury units despite somewhat "cookie-cutter" designs.

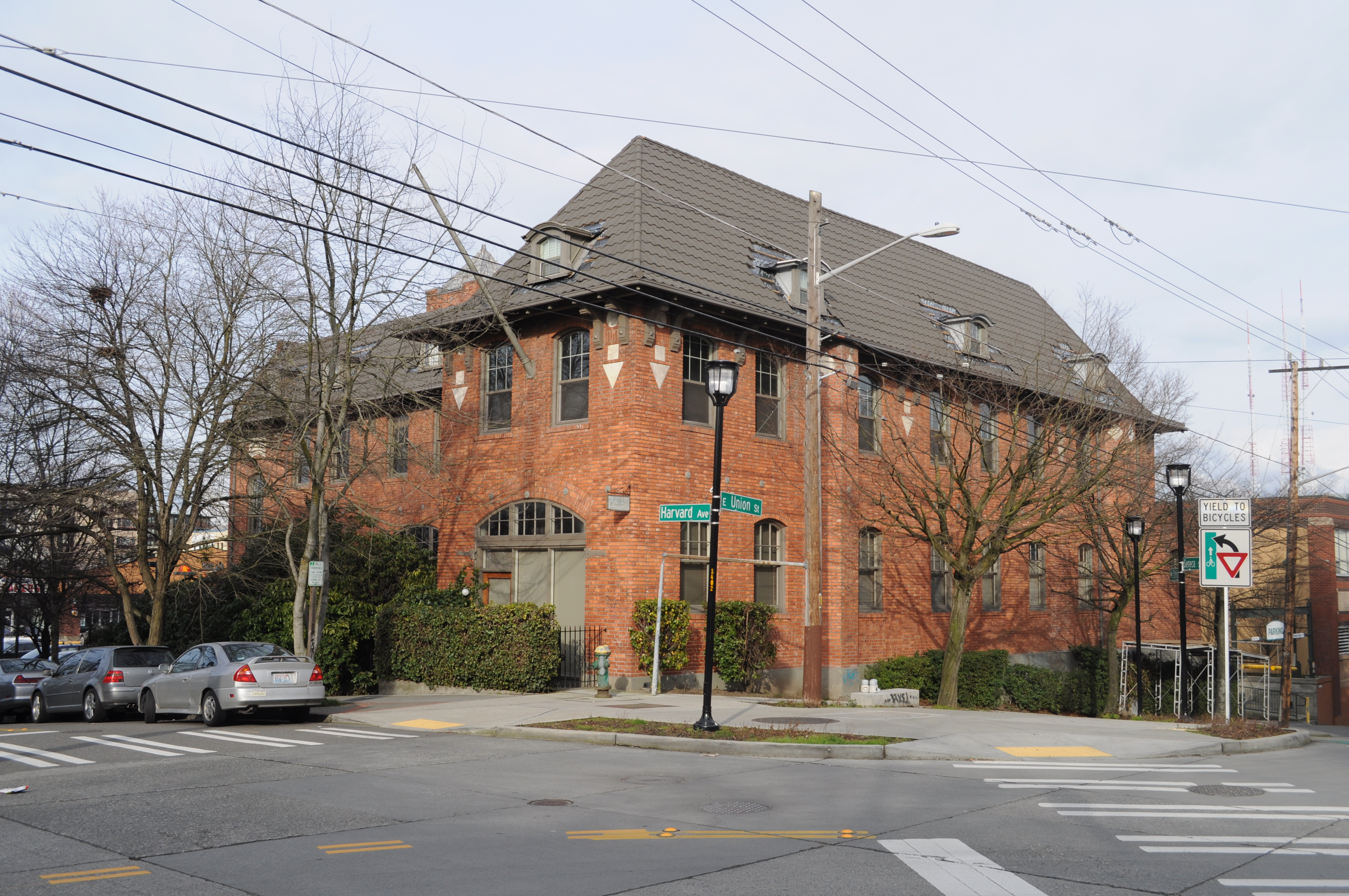
The former Fire Station 25 (built 1909) on the border of Capitol Hill and First Hill, decommissioned in 1970 and converted into 16 condominium apartments in 1980.

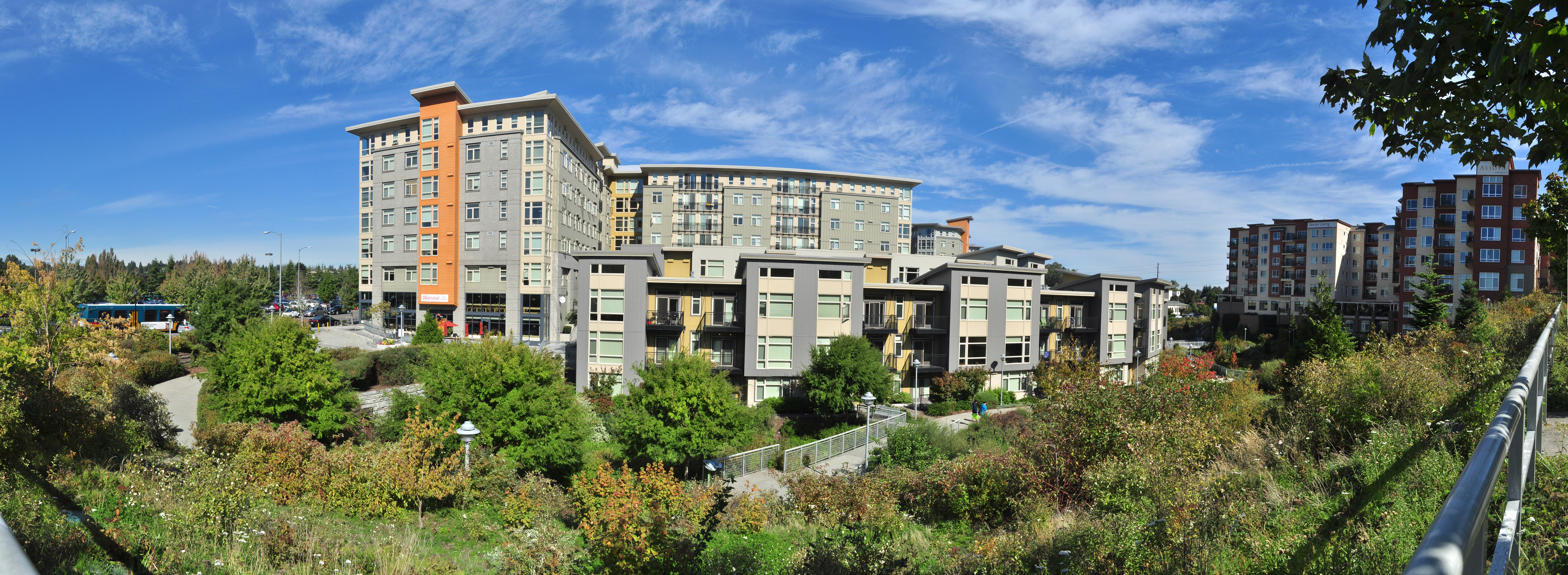
Thornton Place, in the Northgate neighborhood, one of the largest of the mixed-use developments common to Seattle in the early 21st century.

In the 21st century, numerous apartment buildings have been built in Capitol Hill's Pike-Pine Corridor, incorporating façades from the old Auto Row buildings of the Pike/Pine Conservation Overlay District; (see section Façadism below). Other conversions to apartments or condominiums in the late 20th and early 21st centuries have left the original buildings largely intact, but repurposed them as dwellings. These have included schools such as the former Queen Anne High School (built 1908, architects James Stephen & Floyd Naramore; converted 1986, Albert O. Bumgardner) and West Queen Anne School (built 1896, architects Warren Porter Skillings & James N. Corner; converted 1983-84 by Cardwell/Thomas and Associates); Fire Station No. 25 (built 1909, architects Somervell & Cote; converted 1980, Stickney – Murphy); office buildings such as the Cobb Building (built 1910, architect Howells & Stokes; converted 2006, GGLO Architecture & Interior Design) and Seaboard Building (built 1909 as the Northern Bank and Trust Company Building, architect William Doty Van Siclen; converted 2000 by NBBJ); warehouses such as the Florentine (built 1909, architects Lohman & Place; converted 1990) in Pioneer Square or the Monique Lofts (built 1913; converted 1999) on Capitol Hill; and at least one church, the First Church of Christ Scientist, now a condominium known as The Sanctuary (built 1914, architects Bebb & Mendel; converted 2010-2012 by the Runberg Group).

=== Floating homes ===
Seattle has had floating homes (also known as houseboats) almost since the time of first European settlement. At one time there were over 2,500 such homes in the city, not even counting seaworthy live-aboard boats. From the first, these included floating slums of shabby shacks, but gentrified houseboats go back at least to 1888 when the Yesler Way cable car reached Leschi on Lake Washington and a string of luxury summer getaways (none of them surviving today) lined the shore from there north to Madison Park. A 1980 This Old House episode about a Seattle houseboat inspired the setting for the 1993 film Sleepless in Seattle. Seen by some as a bohemian paradise and by others as "lawless nests of anarchic outcasts, rowdy riff-raff, and the flotsam of society," some houseboat colonies succumbed to zoning changes, public health scares, or shoreline and freeway development, while others have survived even in the face of similar pressures. As of 2010, there were about 480 floating homes on Lake Union and a lesser number elsewhere in the city.

Seattle's earliest floating homes were on the downtown waterfront. These were cleared out for sanitary infractions in 1908; at the time some moved to Harbor Island and the Duwamish River. In the Great Depression of the 1930s, the Harbor Island colony grew into a floating Hooverville; it was cleared out during the war, with some of the more sound structures moving to Lake Union. A few floating homes remain on the Duwamish even in the 21st century. Meanwhile, a 1907 law intended to raise money for the Alaska-Yukon-Pacific Exposition forced landowners with shoreline property along Lake Union to either buy the submerged extensions of their property or lose control of them. While the landowners were hardly happy with the law, clear title led many of them to build piers and rent space for houseboats. By 1914, about 200 residences were floating on Lake Union; one was the former Hostess House from the A-Y-P Exposition, transferred to a barge, which remained on the lake into the 1960s. By 1922 the number was up to 1,100, exacerbating issues of water pollution: most of the houseboats fed their sewage directly into the lake, as did many shoreline properties.

Conflicts over sanitation and occasionally building codes and aesthetics continued. By 1938 the last of the floating homes on Lake Washington were banished. The Portage Bay and Lake Union colonies were repeatedly in conflict with nearby neighborhood associations. Some were evicted due to major shoreline projects, such as a United States Coast and Geodetic Survey Base in 1962. In the 1920s, the houseboaters had formed their first formal association, the short-lived Houseboat and Home Protective League; this was succeeded by the Waterfront Improvement Club in 1939, also short-lived. In November 1962, the houseboaters finally formed a long-lived neighborhood association of their own, the Floating Homes Association, with King County deputy assessor George Neale as its first president and activist reporter Terry Pettus as its administrative secretary. That organization has now survived for over 50 years. The sanitation issues were finally settled in 1965, with the installation of the Portage Bay-Lake Union Sewer Line.

In 1972, one threat to the surviving houseboats was removed when state lands commissioner, Bert Cole announced tougher policies on use of underwater lands, effectively preventing the construction of any further large apartment complexes on piers. Four years later, a city ordinance backed by Mayor Wesley Uhlman and councilman John Miller codified regulations to preserve a diverse Lake Union, including houseboats; a 1987 Shoreline Master Program declared houseboats to be a "preferred" shoreline use.

Seattle's houseboats differ in numerous ways from other housing in the city. In contrast to other single-family dwellings, any parking is inevitably on shore, with the docks themselves entirely pedestrianized. Many have small sailboats or dinghies docked at their sides; some have floating gardens, including vegetable gardens. A typical 1920s houseboat was a small rectangular building, built atop a raft of logs or a former fishing barge, often with a rounded "'sprung' roof... constructed by... bending ships laps (notched lath) over a central beam or two and nailing them down to the side walls," although those with more money and stronger aesthetic concerns opted for peaked roofs, more like the houses ashore. They ranged from tar paper-covered shacks to pleasant shingled houses. In that era, houseboats lined the shore; houseboat piers reaching out into the lake were a later development.

The rafts or barges inevitably rotted over time, and replacing them was not easy. By the 1970s, the preferred flotation devices were "styrofoam logs", with a lift of 60 pounds per cubic foot (960 kg/m^{3}). By that time, the nature of new houseboats was changing radically. Architects such as Grant Copeland began designing high-end floating homes in the 1960s; many of the newer floating homes had two stories, where as nearly all of the old ones were single-story. People began to see houseboats as investments. By 1974, Dick Wagner, president of the Floating Homes Association, was warning that Lake Union was turning into a "floating Bellevue" (alluding to a wealthy Seattle suburb). "The people are now interesting but rich. They used to be interesting but poor."

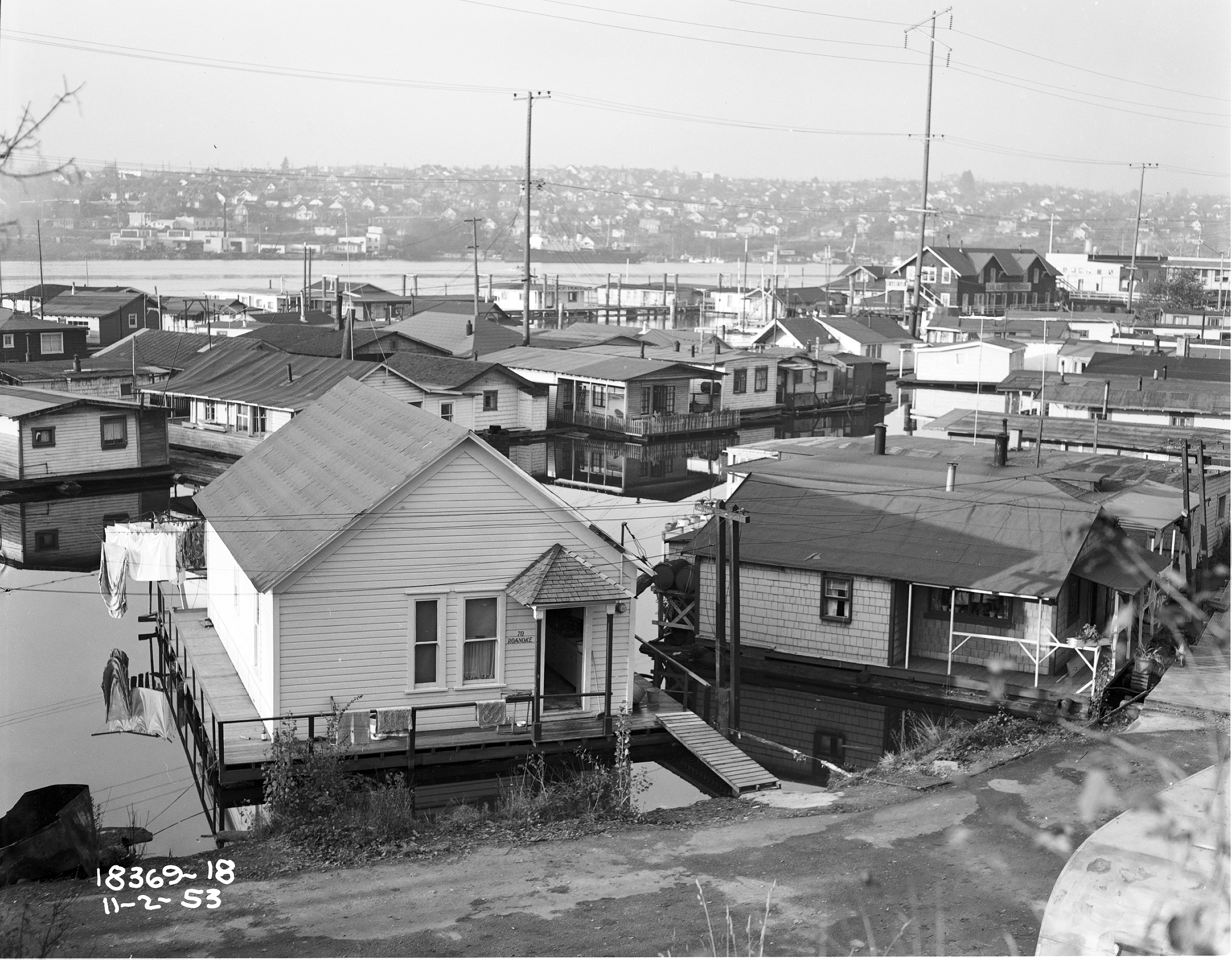
Floating homes on the east shore of Lake Union near Roanoke Street, Seattle, 1953.

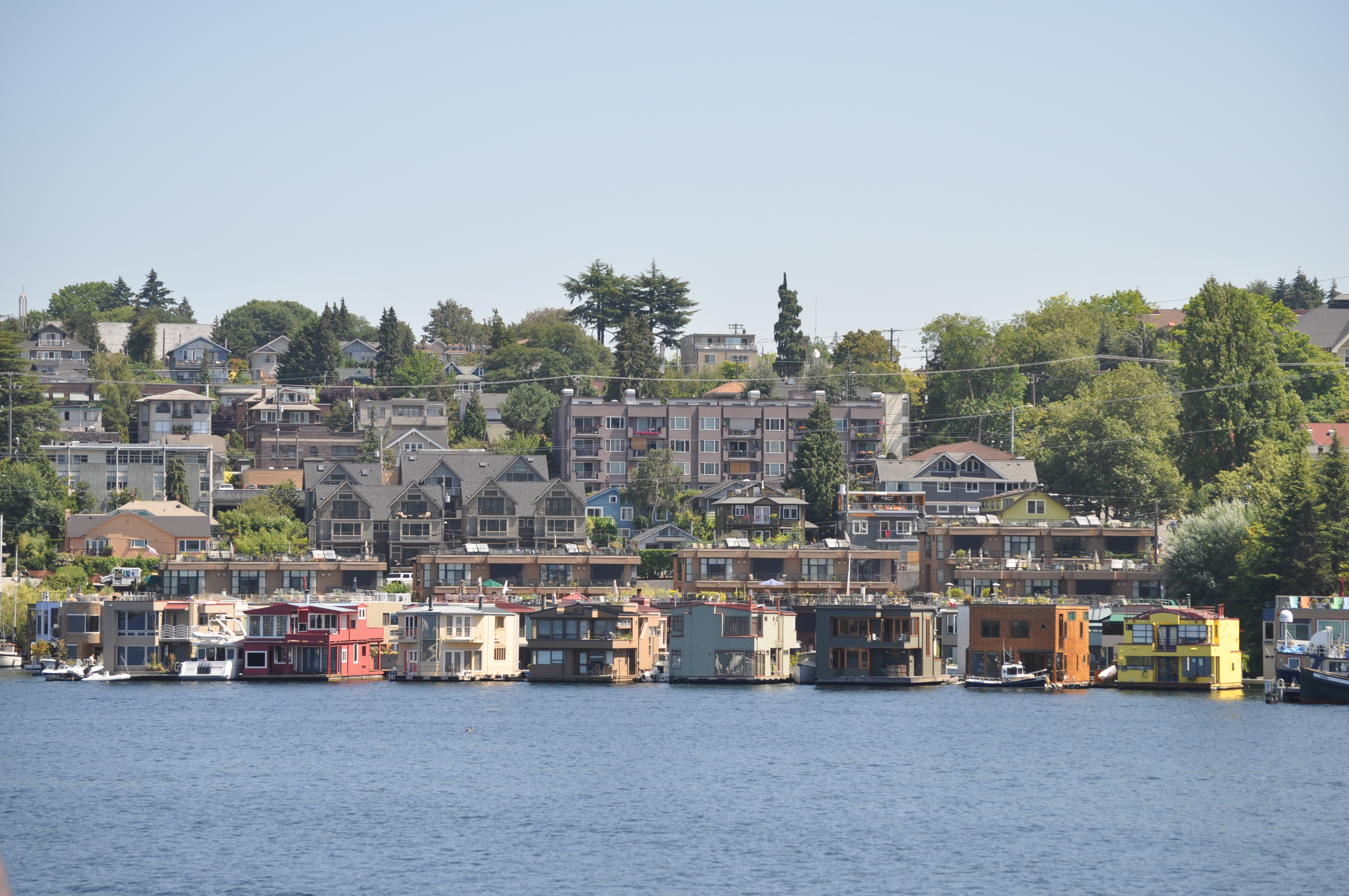
Along the waterline, the two-story floating homes of Roanoke Reef, seen here from Gas Works Park, have replaced the more modest structures in the previous image.

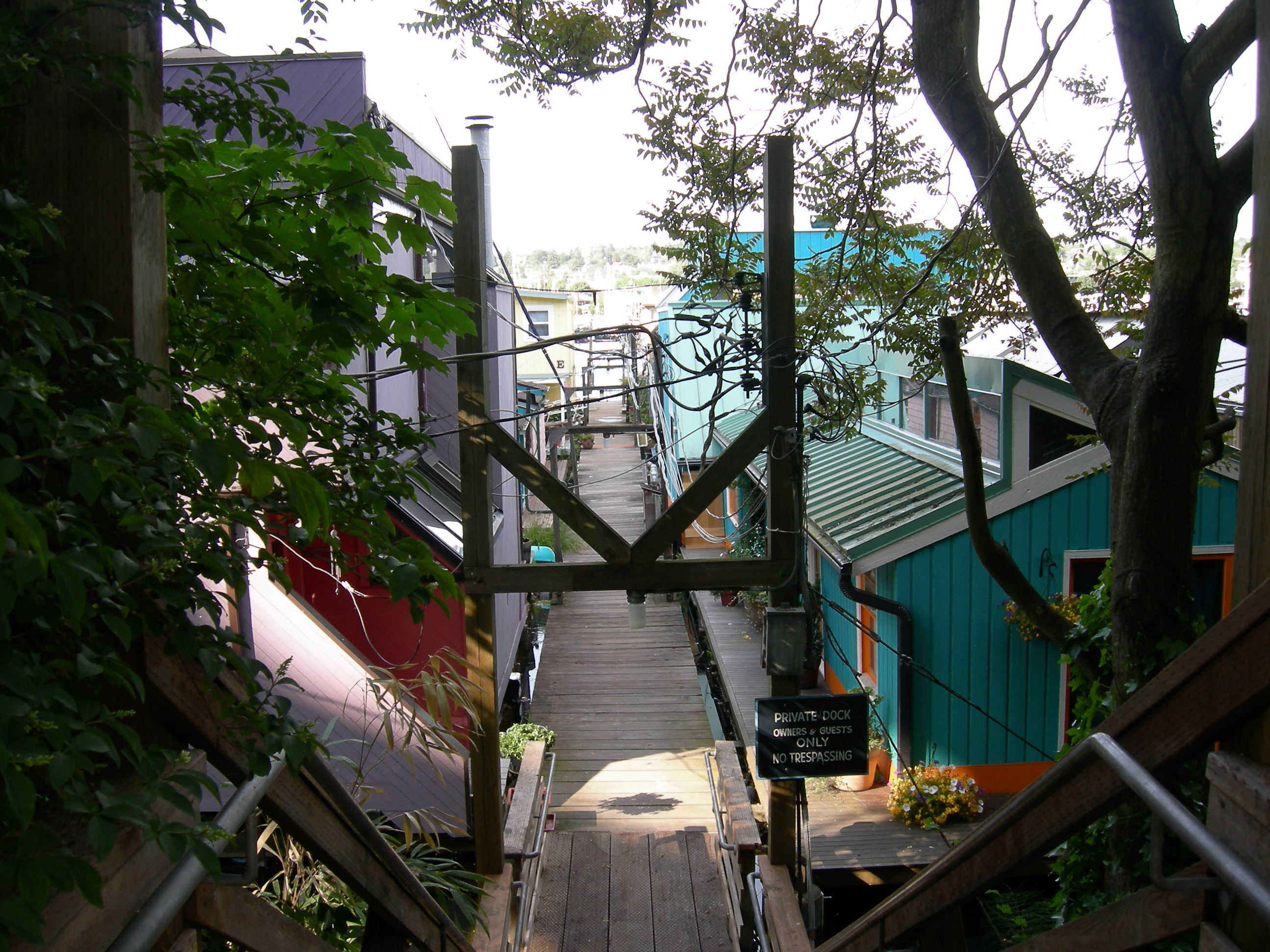
Looking along a dock in Westlake, with floating homes on either side.

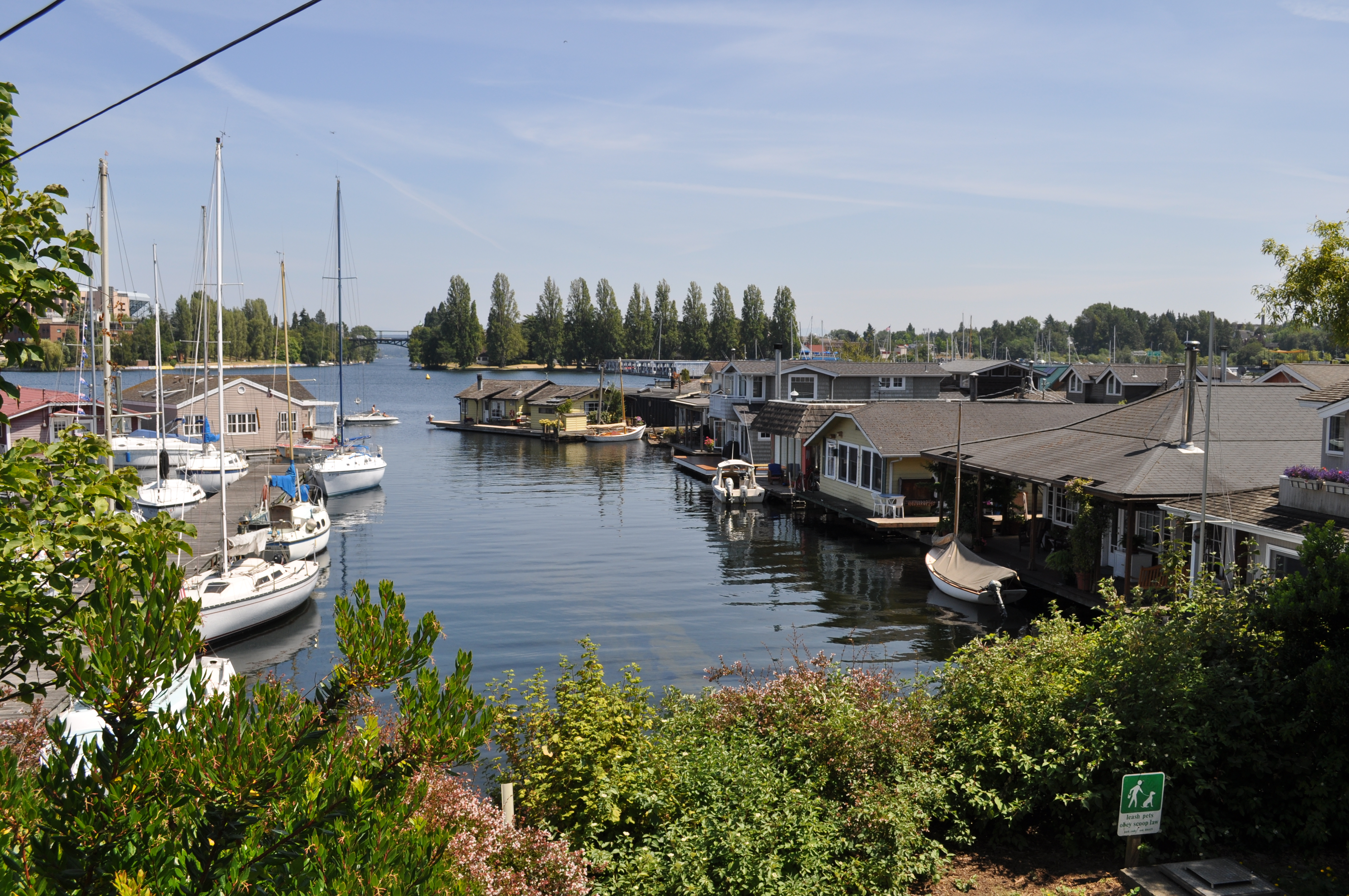
Floating homes on Portage Bay at the foot of E. Shelby Street. Looking toward the Montlake Cut.

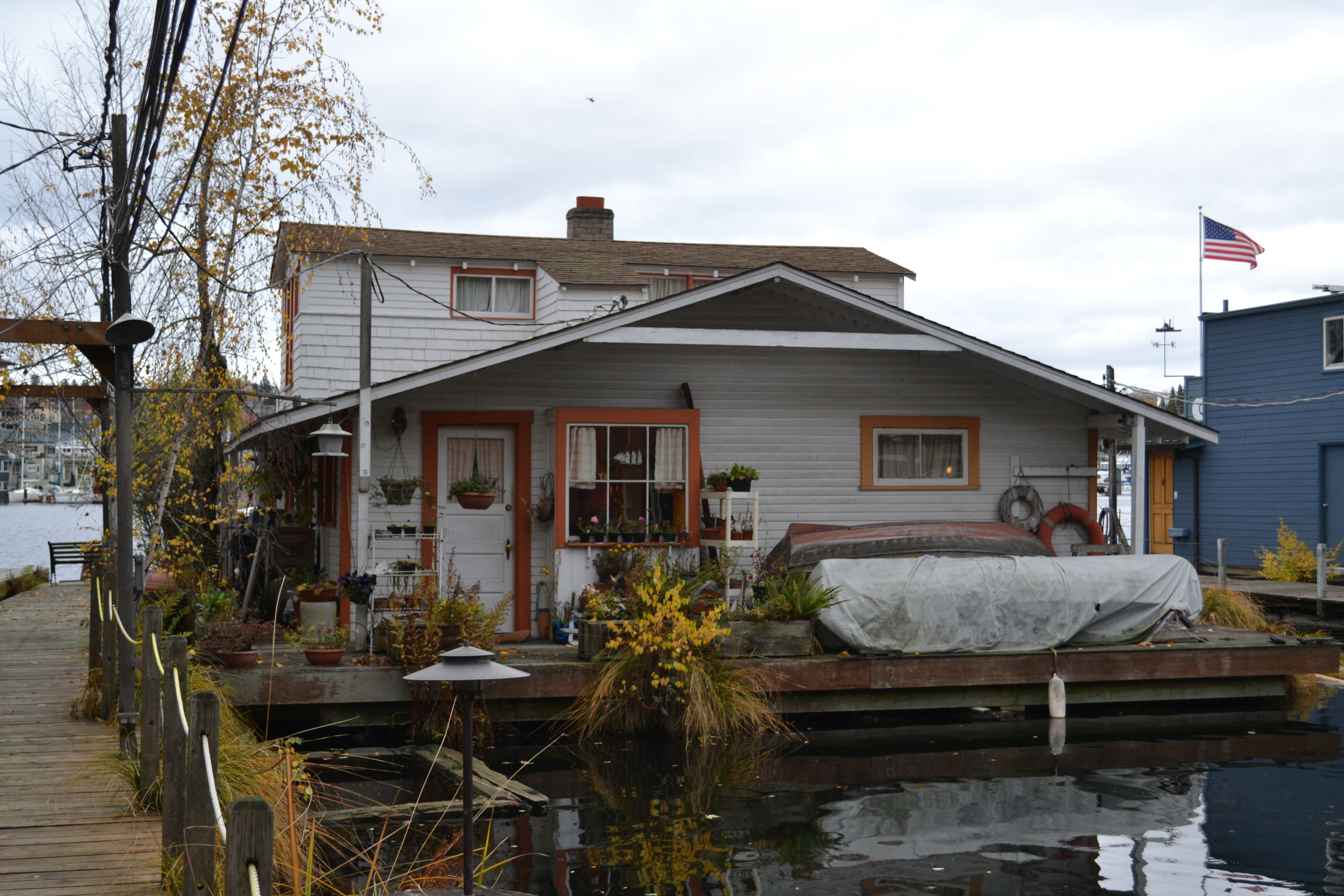
The NRHP-listed Wagner Houseboat, home of Dick Wagner, former president of the Floating Homes Association and founder of the Center for Wooden Boats.

== Office and retail buildings ==
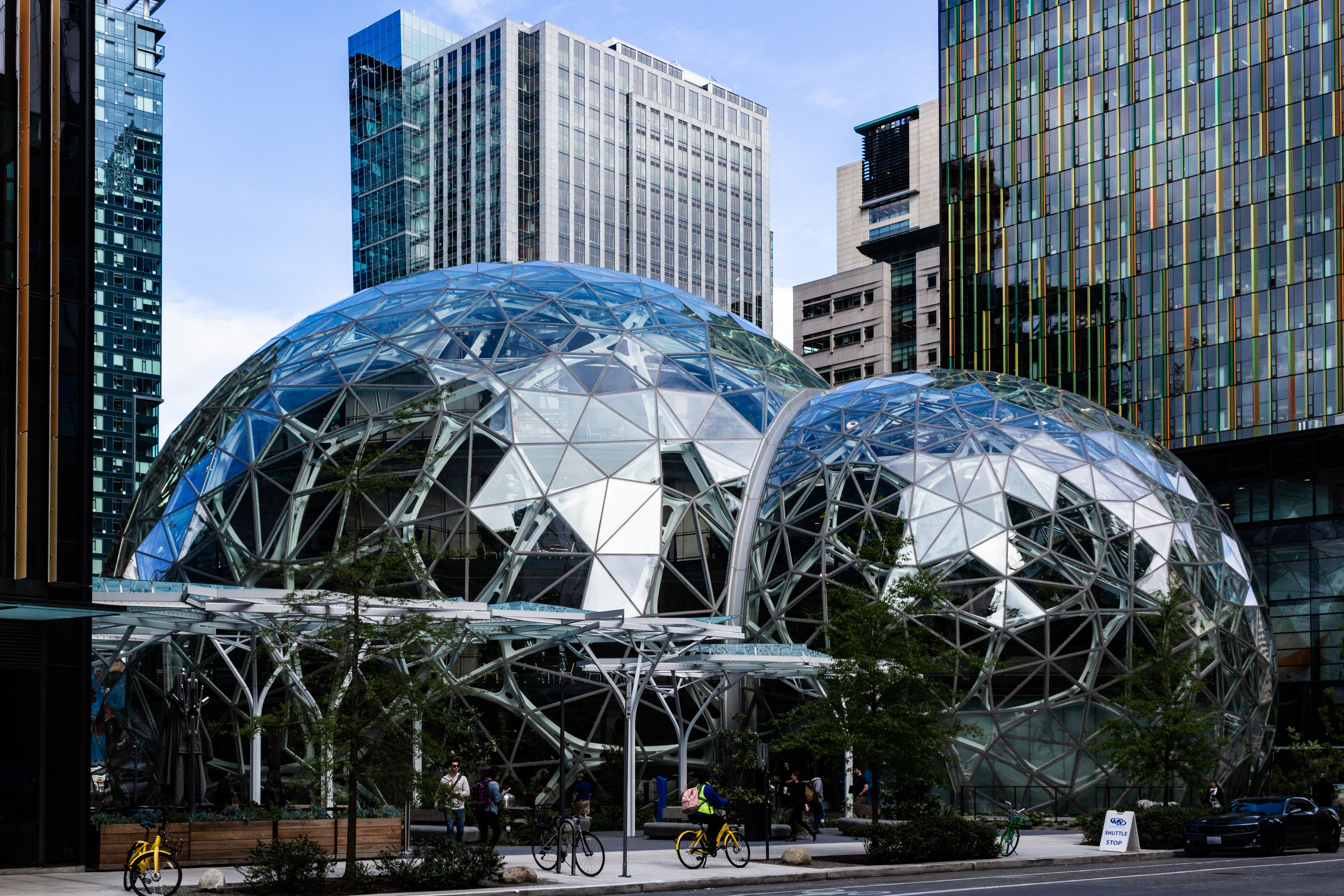
The Spheres, colloquially known as Bezos' Balls, part of Amazon's Headquarters.

The Seattle Department of Neighborhoods describes Pioneer Square as "Seattle's original downtown... [r]ebuilt after the devastating "Great Fire" of 1889...characterized by late nineteenth century brick and stone buildings and one of the nation's best surviving collections of Romanesque Revival style urban architecture." Since 1970, it has been listed federally as a National Historic District and a locally as a preservation district. The neighborhood was rebuilt rapidly after the fire with buildings that met the conditions of the new building code, Ordinance 1147. Construction halted almost completely after the Panic of 1893, then resumed at a rapid pace five years later as Seattle became a jumping-off point for the Klondike Gold Rush. Because the center of Seattle's downtown later shifted several blocks north, a very large number of these 1890s buildings were still intact, though run down, as the architectural conservation movement grew in the 1960s. Over the decades since, most of the district's surviving older buildings have been successfully rehabilitated.

At the other end of Downtown is Pike Place Market, the oldest continually operating farmers' market in the United States and another historic district with both national and city status. A public market since 1907, after threats to its continued existence in the late 1960s it underwent major rehabilitation in the early 1970s, with a plan that centered on "preserving the buildings in their original form, as much as possible."

As of 2017, Downtown Seattle contains all but one of the 20 tallest buildings in Washington (the nearby Space Needle being the sole exception); the vast majority are office buildings, although the office-residential-hotel Rainier Square Tower, which broke ground is slated to become the city's second-tallest building; the F5 Tower, due to be completed in 2017, will be partly a hotel; and the all-hotel Hyatt Regency Seattle under construction at 8th and Howell will also make it into the top 20. Even the Smith Tower, built in 1914 and until 1931 the tallest building west of the Mississippi River, remains taller than any building in the state outside of Seattle. Notable among the older buildings are the 15-floor Alaska Building (1904) designed by St. Louis, Missouri firm Eames and Young; the 17-floor Hoge Building (1911, Bebb and Mendel); and the aforementioned Smith Tower (1914, Gaggin & Gaggin); all of these are near the south end of the present-day downtown. The downtown core edged north with the Dexter Horton Building; completed in 1924, the 14-story building covers roughly half a city block. A few years later and a bit further north came two notable Art Deco buildings, both built on the verge of the Great Depression: the Eliel Saarinen-influenced Seattle Tower (1929, Albertson, Wilson & Richardson), originally known as the Northern Life Tower, and the 22-story Exchange Building (1930, John Graham & Associates).

From the Great Depression of the 1930s well into the 1960s, Seattle added relatively few major office buildings. The drought was somewhat broken by the International Style Norton Building (1959, Bindon & Wright, Skidmore, Owings & Merrill), but the Central Business District skyline changed little until the 50-floor Seattle-First National Bank Building (now Safeco Plaza; 1969, NBBJ), 42-floor Union Bank of California Building (now simply known as 901 Fifth Avenue; 1973, John Graham & Company); and 37-floor Federal Building (now Henry M. Jackson Federal Building, 1974, John Graham & Company) the 32-floor Pacific Northwest Bell Building (now Qwest Plaza or simply 1600 Seventh, 1976, John Graham & Company); and the 41-floor Rainier Bank Tower (now Rainier Tower, 1977, NBBJ and Minoru Yamasaki). All of these were designed by architects with strong local connections: NBBJ and John Graham were both Seattle-based firms, and New-York-based Yamasaki was born, raised, and educated in Seattle.

As new buildings in an already-developed city center, the construction these and others represented loss of earlier major buildings. For example, one of the buildings sacrificed for the Federal Building was Elmer H. Fisher's Richardsonian Romanesque Burke Building (1890), comparable to his surviving Pioneer Building; the Rainier Tower and adjoining Rainier Square in the Metropolitan Tract required the demolition of the Beaux-Arts White Henry Stuart Buildings (1907–1911, Howells and Stokes), built on the same general design as the surviving Cobb Building (1910). While it is certainly true that Seattle's Central Business District has moved steadily north, the impression of this is exaggerated by the loss of many major late 19th and early 20th century buildings in what was once the northern part of the business district and is now the center, while Pioneer Square to the south remained relatively intact.

The trend toward tall office buildings continued beyond the late 1970s. The 76-story, 287.4 m (943 ft) Columbia Center (originally Columbia Seafirst Center, 1982–1985, Chester Lindsey Architects) is currently the third tallest structure on the West Coast (after the U.S. Bank Tower in Los Angeles and the Salesforce Tower in San Francisco). Its bulk prompted a reaction in terms of height limits, zoning that favored interesting profiles, and height and density bonuses for public amenities. These strongly influenced the city's second-tallest building, the 55-story, 235.31 m (772.0 ft) Deco Revival 1201 Third Avenue (originally Washington Mutual Tower, 1986–1988, Kohn Pedersen Fox Associates and The McKinley Architects). There was then a gap of 17 years until the next major skyscraper, the Russell Investments Center (originally WaMu Center), which opened in 2006. Although the Great Recession of 2008-2012 constituted another shorter slack period, Seattle emerged from that with a record-setting construction boom.

Like most American cities, Seattle has long had its share of downtown retail, including department stores and a few older-style shopping arcades. The initial commercial center was the Pioneer Square neighborhood, but by 1910 there was "a distinct concentration of specialty and department stores ... along Second Avenue from Marion Street to Pike Street"; a surviving architectural example as of 2016 is the J.A Baillargeon Building (1908) at the northeast corner of 2nd Avenue and Spring Street. At one time the strip also included the Rialto Building (1894, Skillings and Corner), original site of Frederick & Nelson; The Bon Marché (1896, 1902, 1911, Saunders and Lawton); the Arcade Building/Rhodes Store (1903); the subject Galland Building/Stone Fisher Lane Store (1906, extant but scheduled for demolition as of 2016); the Chapin Building/ McDougall and Southwick Co. (1907). The department store district eventually shifted slightly north and east. Prominent among the historic department stores are the Bon Marché flagship store (1929, now Macy's, which absorbed The Bon), Nordstrom, and Frederick & Nelson (1918, now defunct; their former flagship store is now the Nordstrom flagship store) The Bon and Frederick's flagship stores are both now official Seattle Landmarks; the Bon is also on the National Register. Surviving arcades include much of Pike Place Market, the shops at the Olympic Hotel or in Ralph Anderson's 1971–1972 remodel of the Squire-Latimer Building/Grand Central Hotel, now Grand Central on the Park. The city was a relative latecomer to modern, in-city "galleria"-style malls. The first such was Westlake Center (1988), followed by the larger Pacific Place (1998).

The city has the usual complement of strip malls, as well as two major suburban-style malls. Northgate Mall, designed by John Graham, Jr., opened in 1950 as an open-air mall, one of the country's first post-war, suburban mall-type shopping centers. University Village, built on former lakebed northeast of the main campus of the University of Washington, was originally (1956) comparable to Westwood Village in West Seattle and Aurora Village north of city limits in Shoreline, Washington and like them was originally developed by Continental Inc. After a change in management, University Village was reworked to create stronger pedestrian spaces and bring in more upmarket tenants. The Seattle area's other suburban-style malls (such as Westfield Southcenter) all sit outside city limits.

Seattle annexed several other towns and cities in the period 1905–1910, many of whose historic centers now constitute important commercial neighborhoods within the city. The shopping districts of Ballard and Columbia City both center on federally- and city-recognized historic districts preserving buildings many of which date back to their period as an independent town (Ballard) or city (Columbia City).

The 21st century has seen a major expansion of Seattle's commercial center into South Lake Union. Previously predominantly a district of small buildings with light industrial uses, since 2000 it has become mostly a district of mid-rise office buildings. Beginning in the mid-2010s, more high-rises and residential buildings are being added to the mix. As of 2015, the district has a major presence from Amazon.com and a variety of biotech businesses. While no one architect has been strongly identified with the district, much of the construction has been driven by Vulcan, Inc., owned by Paul Allen, co-founder of Microsoft.

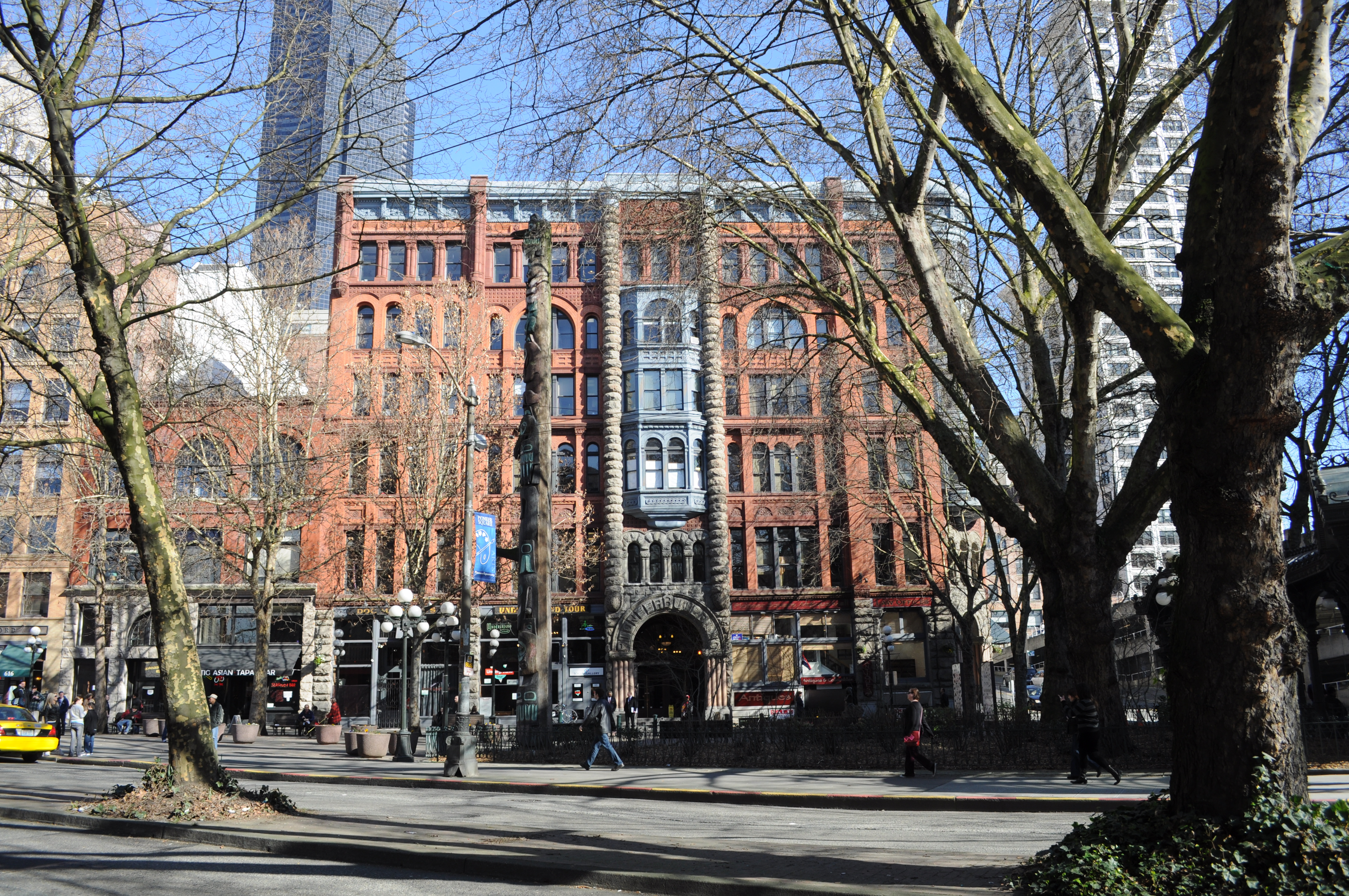
The Pioneer Building, a Richardsonian Romanesque building designed by Elmer H. Fisher and completed in 1892. Fischer designed numerous Seattle buildings in the four years between the Great Seattle Fire (1889) and the Panic of 1893.

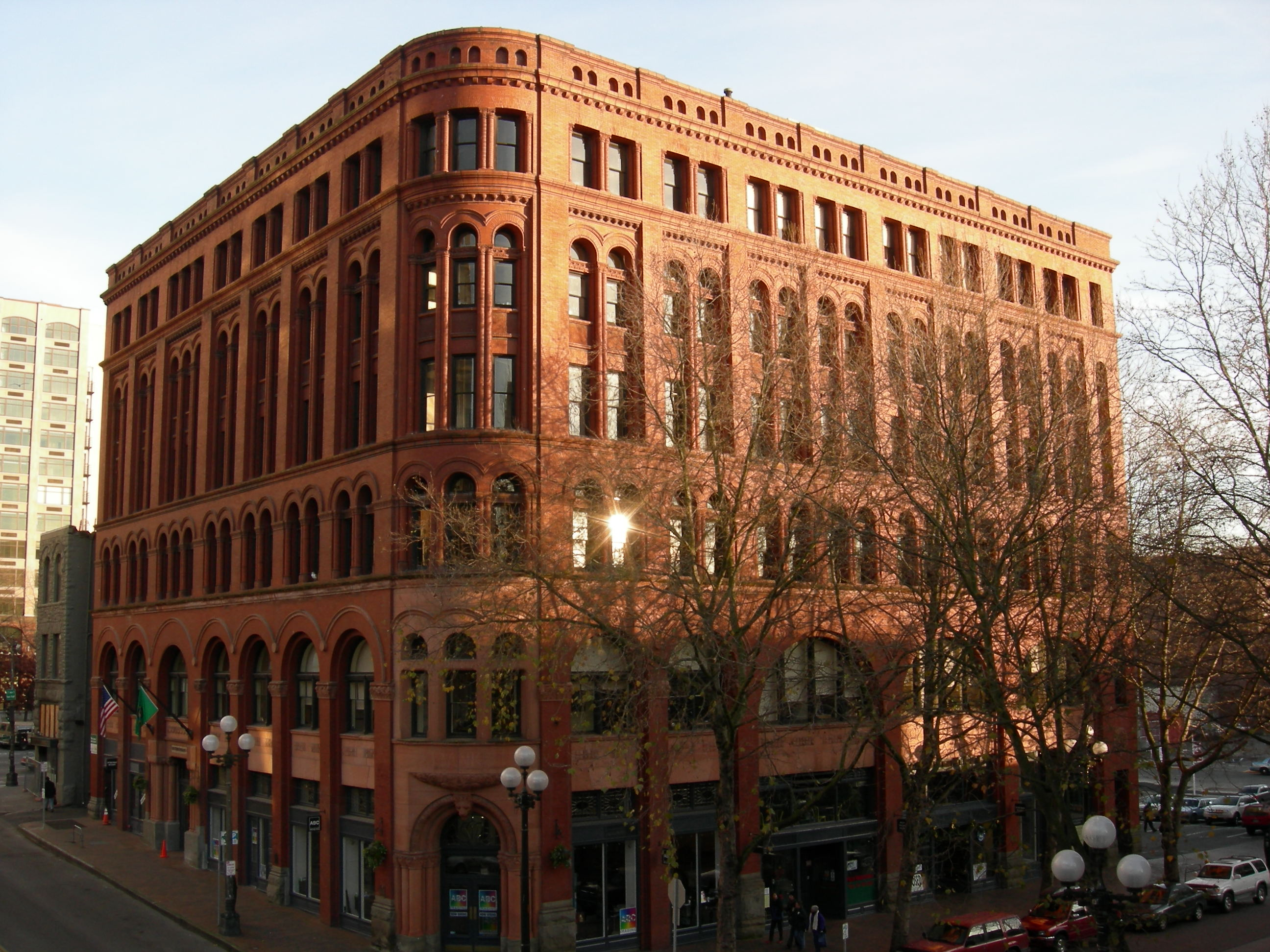
The Interurban Building, also completed 1892, made the name of British-born architect John B. Parkinson, later of Los Angeles.

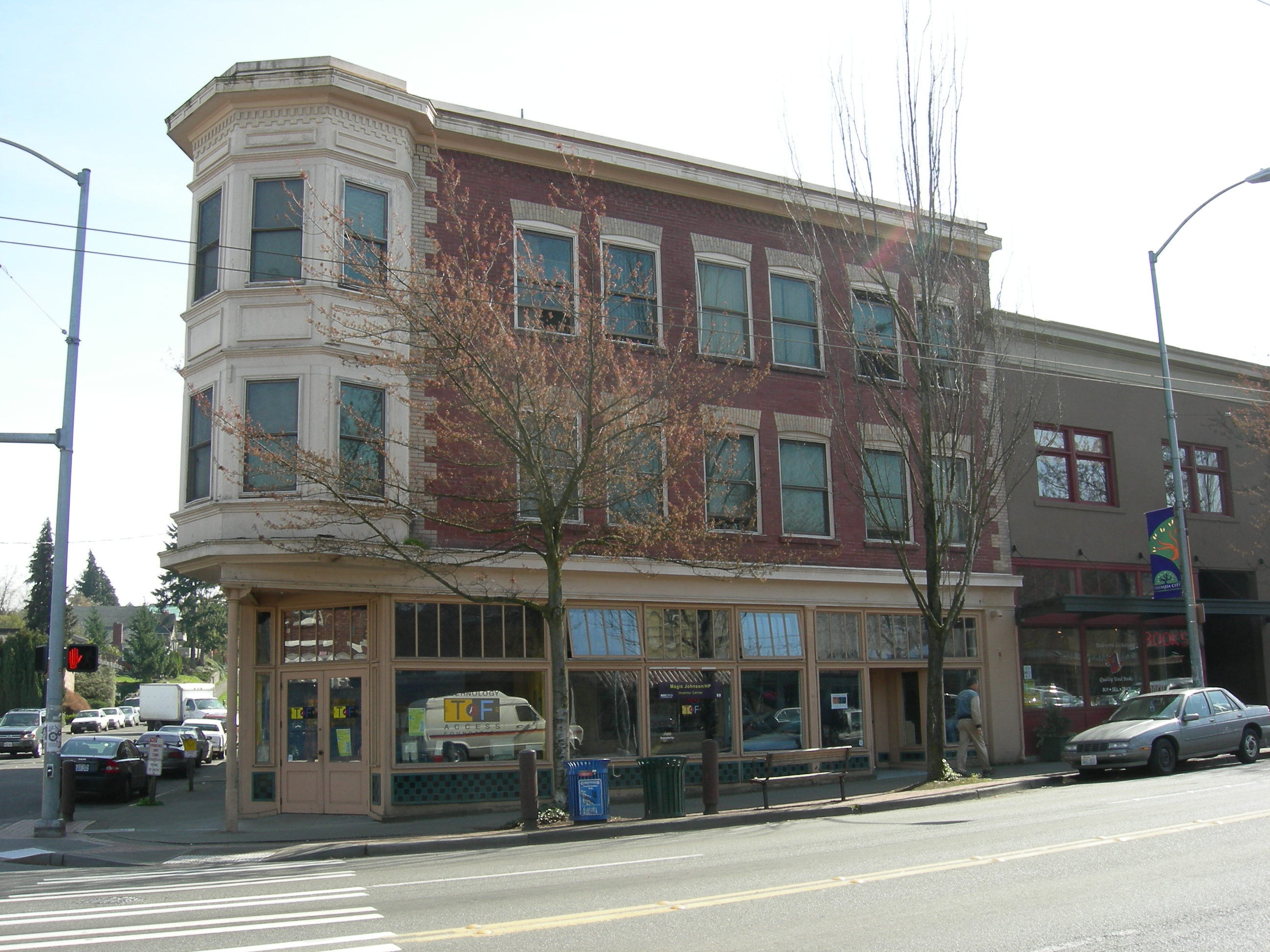
Toby Block in the Columbia City neighborhood (1907, third floor 1913)

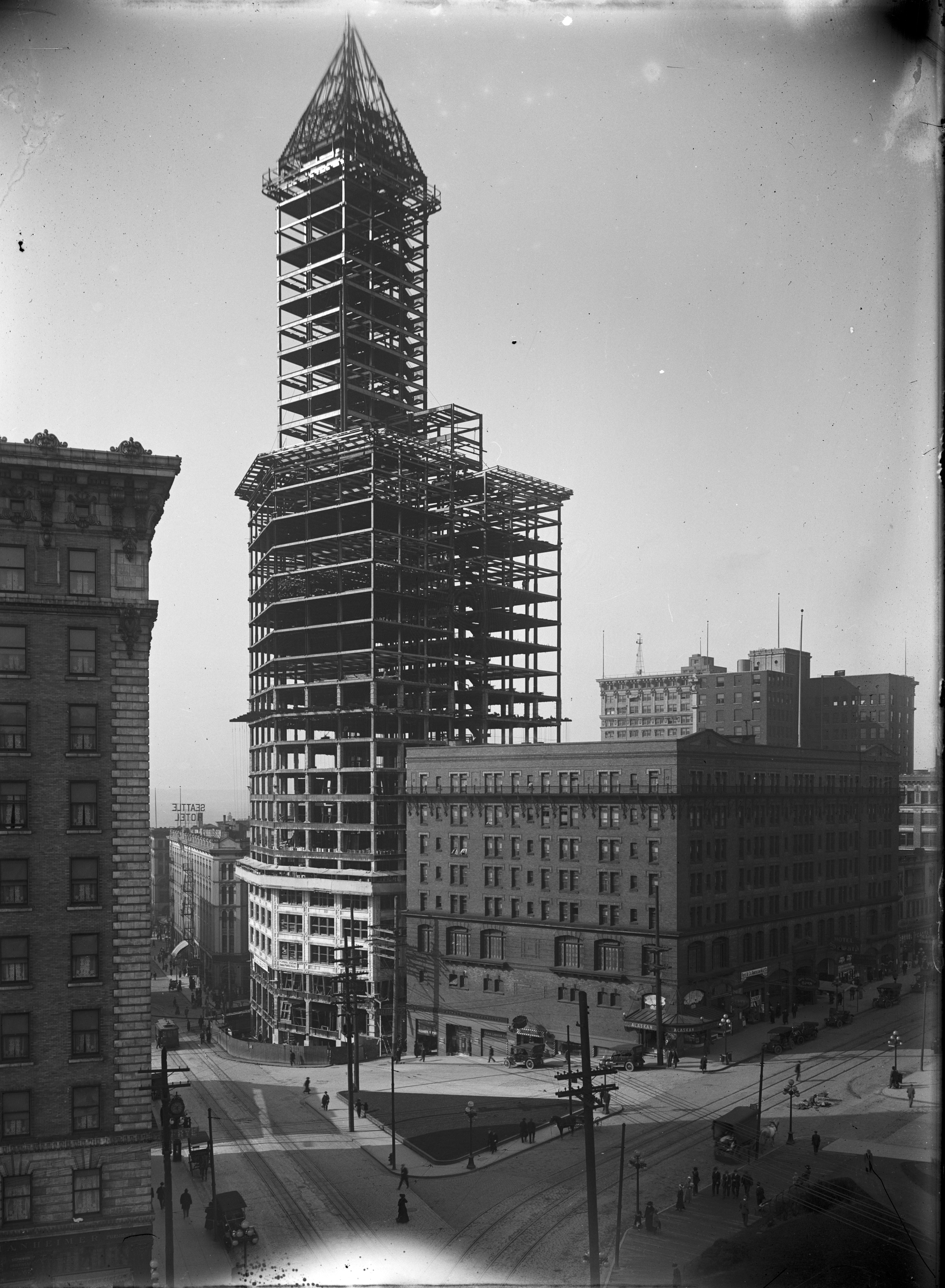
The Smith Tower, designed by Gaggin & Gaggin of Syracuse, New York; completed 1914, shown here under construction in 1913. At 38 stories, it was tallest office building west of the Mississippi River until the Kansas City Power & Light Building (1931), and the tallest building on the West Coast until the Space Needle (1962).

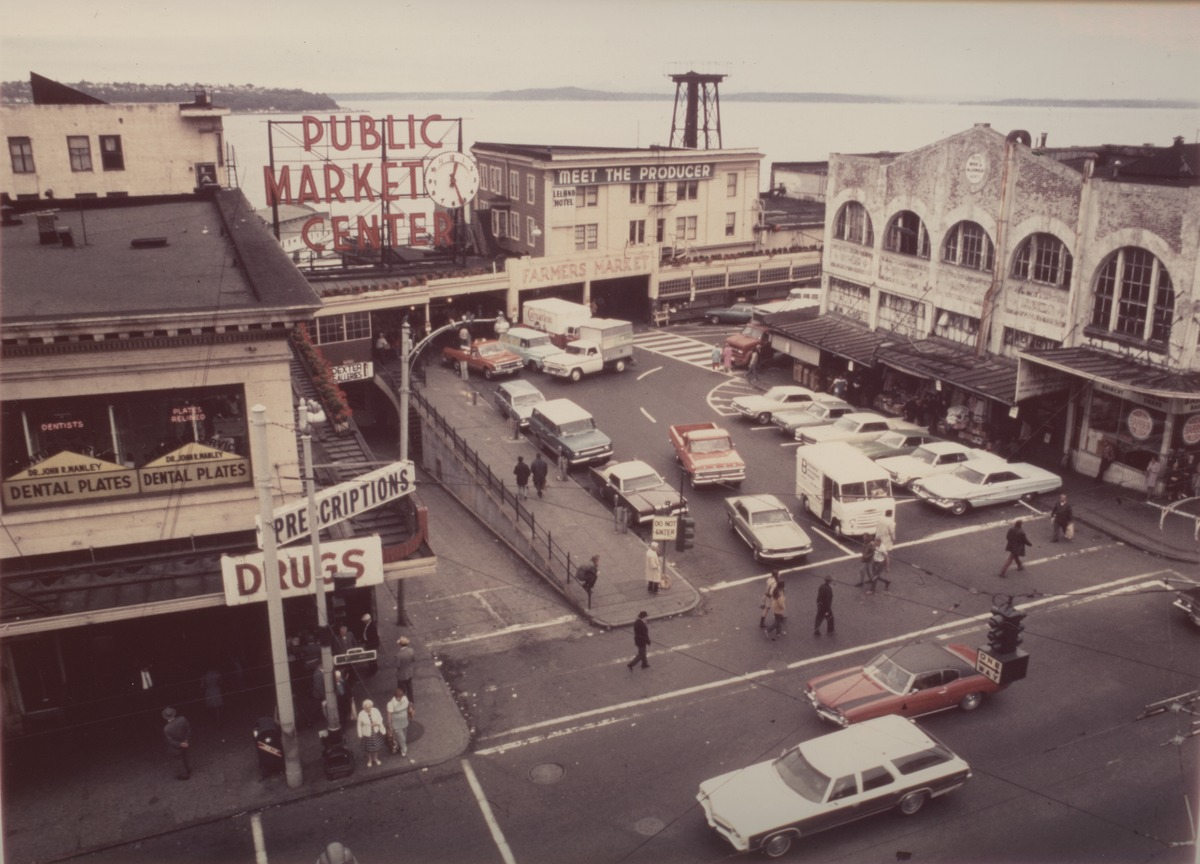
Pike Place Market, shown here in 1972 shortly before renovation.

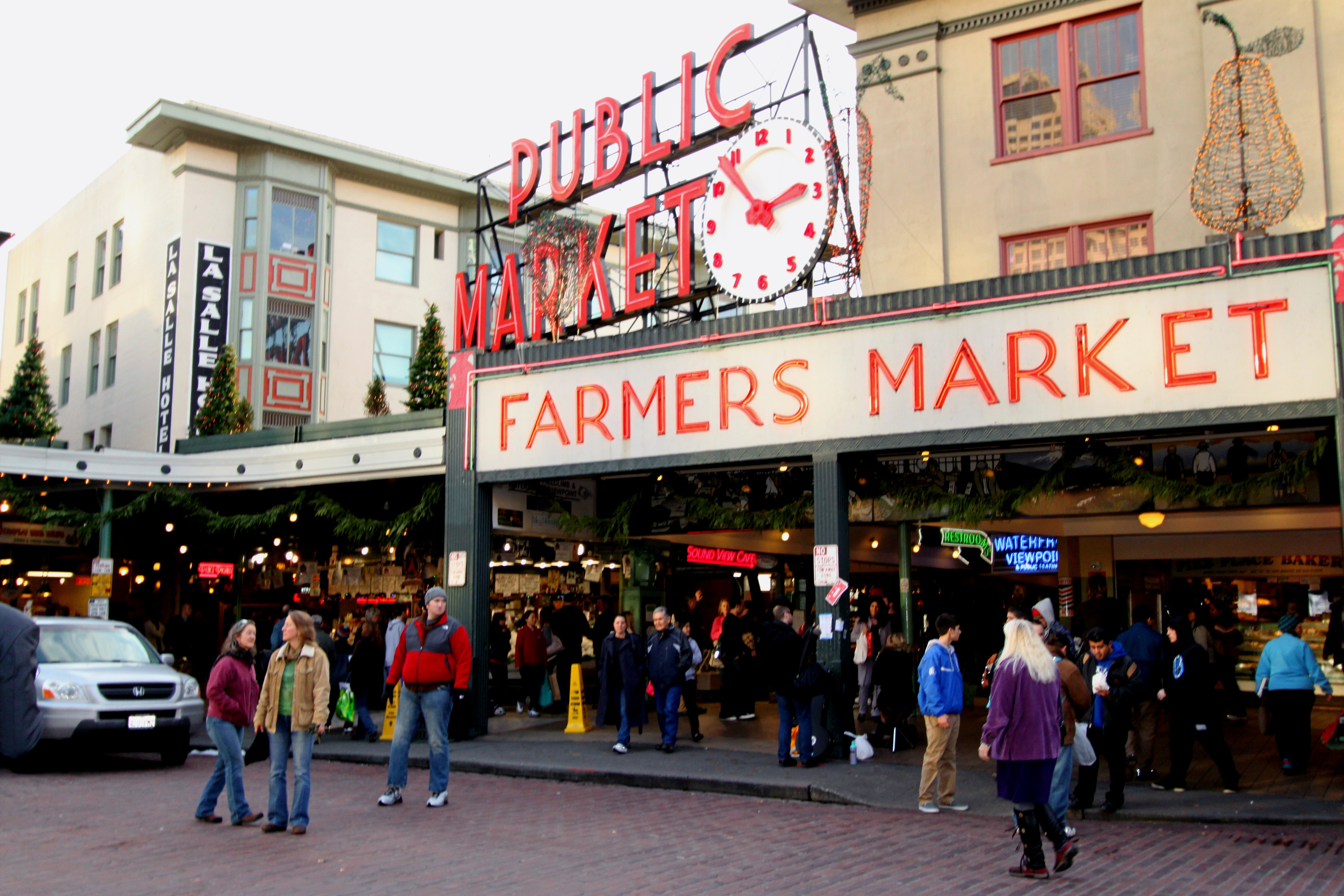
Pike Place Market in 2010.

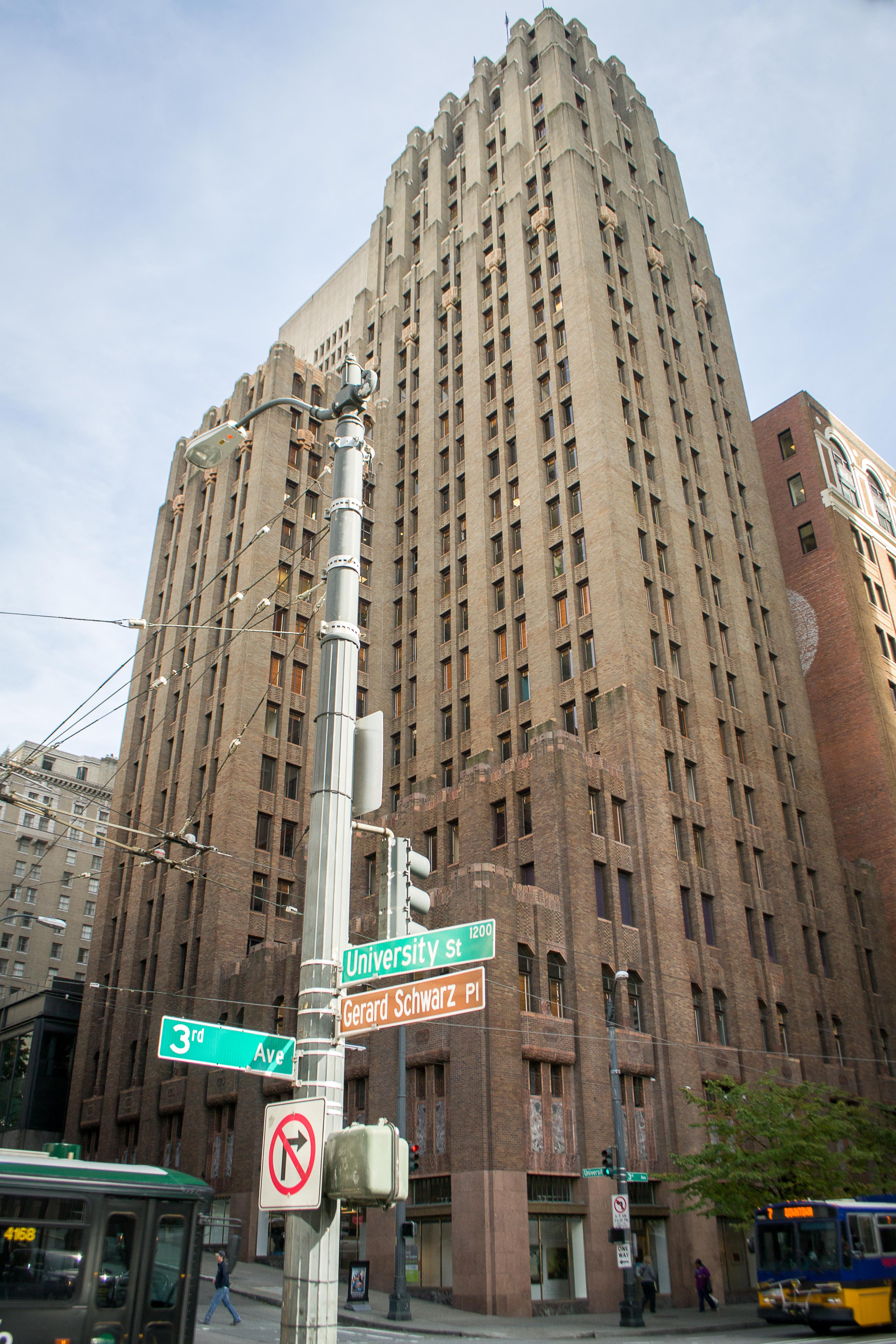
The Seattle Tower, originally Northern Life Tower, an Art Deco building by architects Albertson, Wilson & Richardson, completed in 1928.

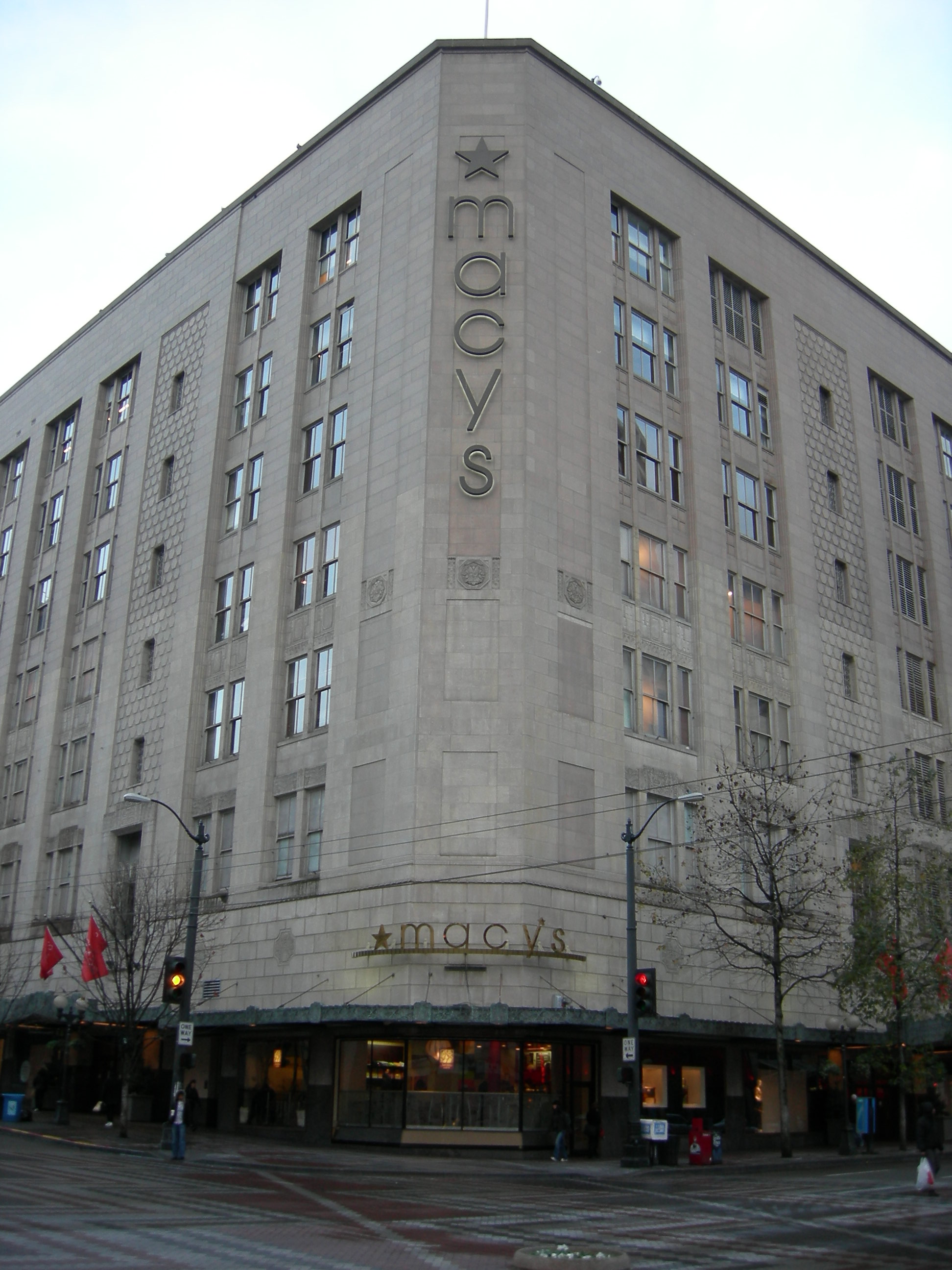
Downtown Seattle Macy's, the former Bon Marché flagship store, opened 1929.

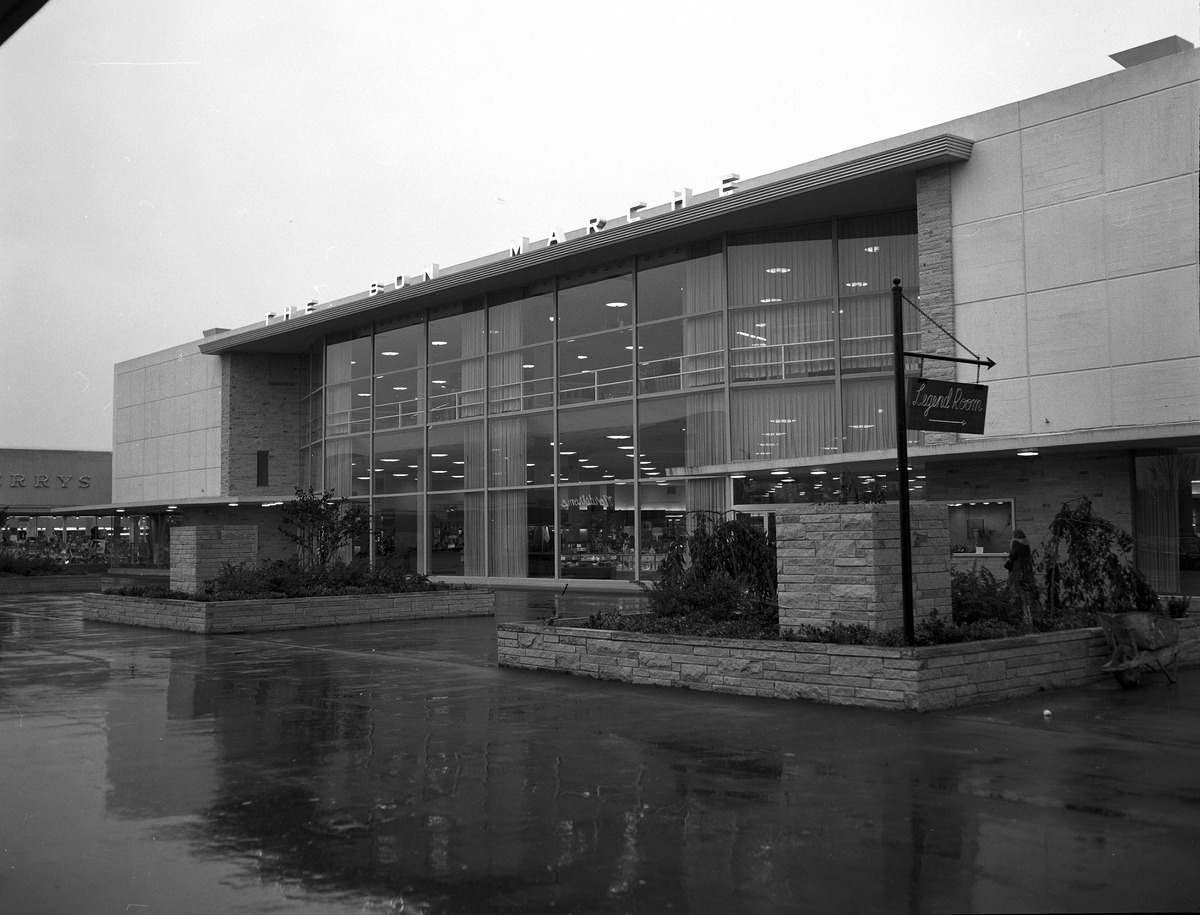
Bon Marché store at Northgate Mall, photographed the year the mall opened in 1950. The mall was initially developed by Allied Stores (parent company of The Bon).

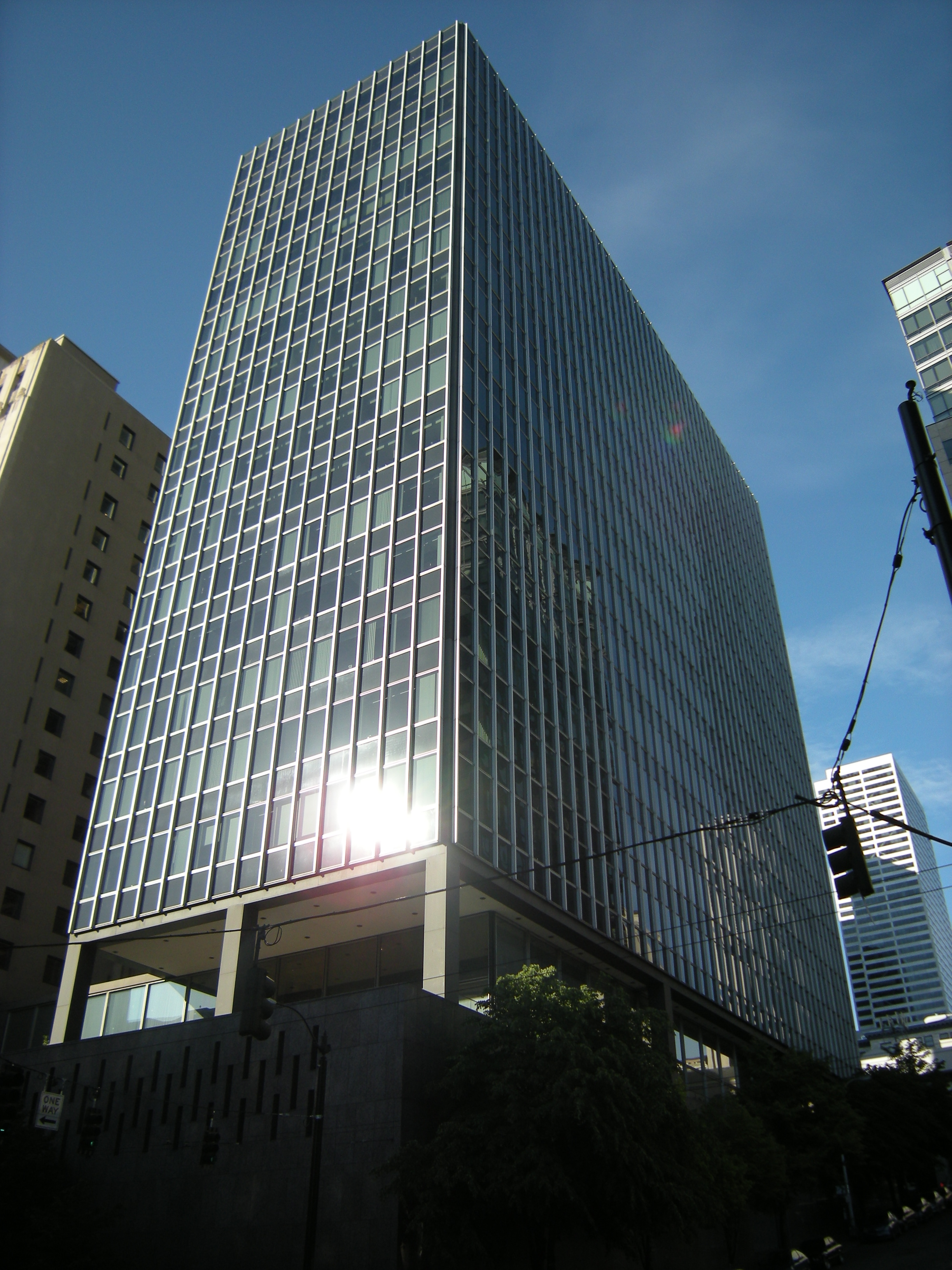
The Norton Building, completed 1959, one of Seattle's first examples of the International Style.

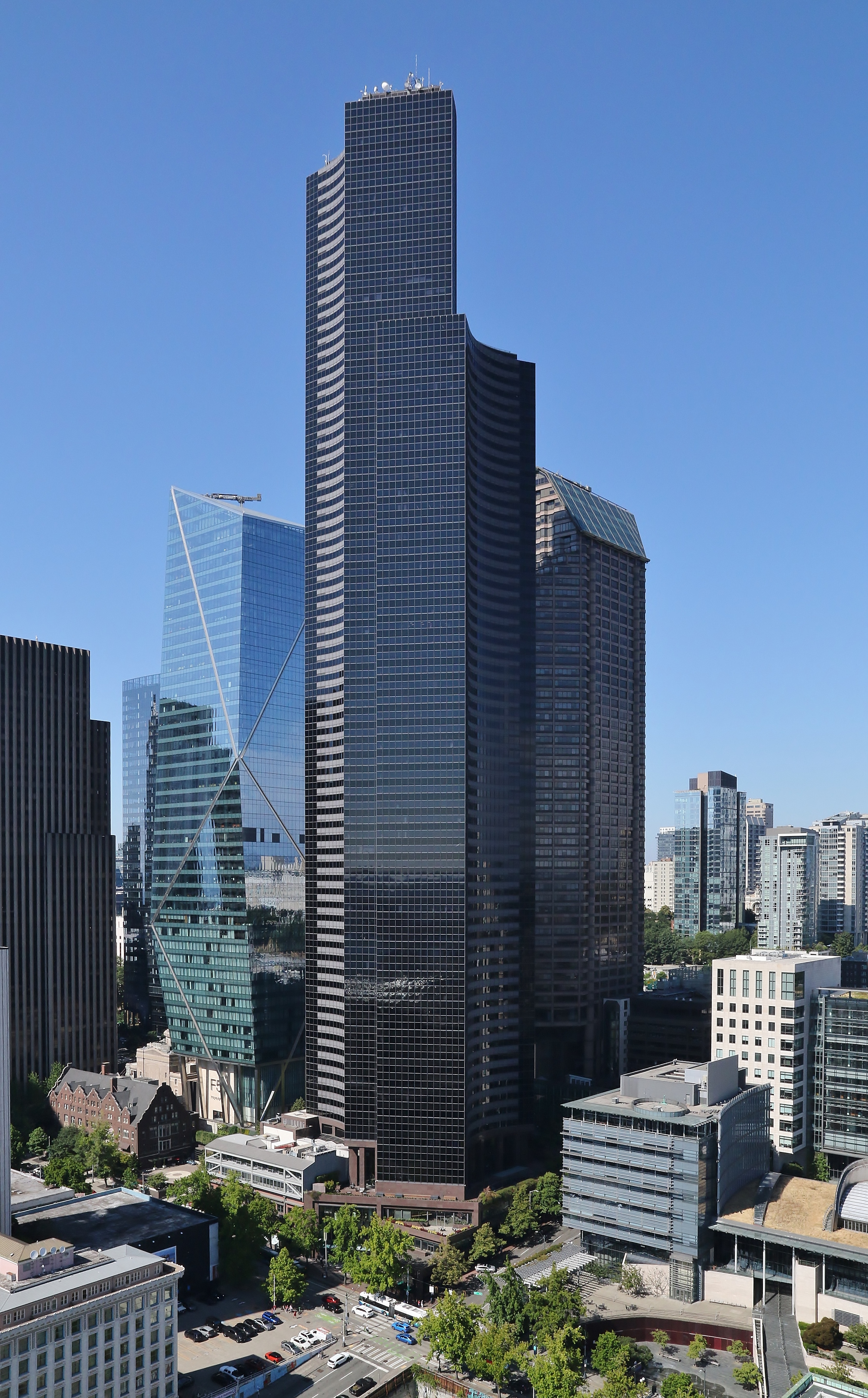
Columbia Center, Seattle's tallest skyscraper, completed 1985. Designed by Chester L. Lindsey Architects.

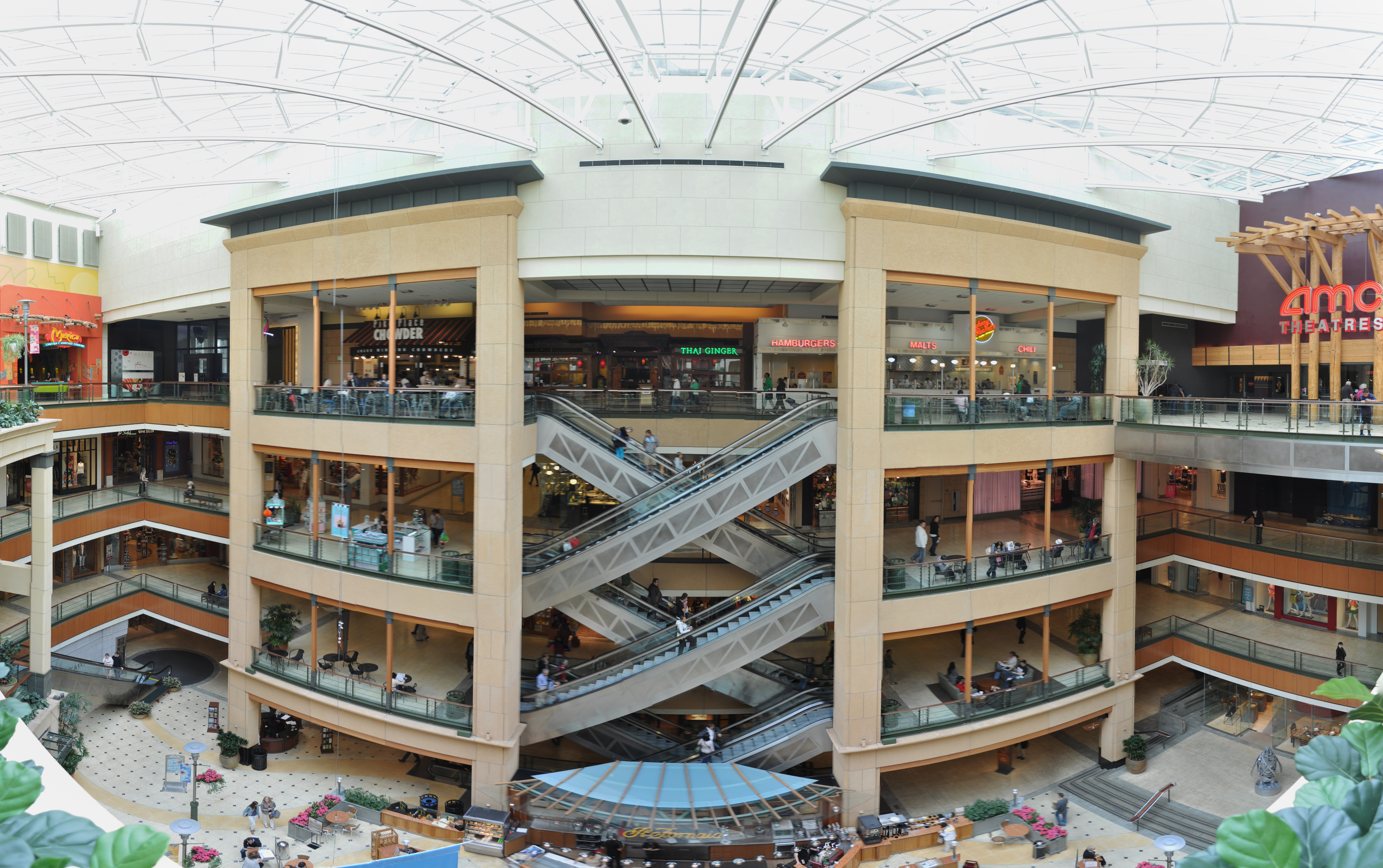
A panoramic view of the interior of the Pacific Place shopping mall.

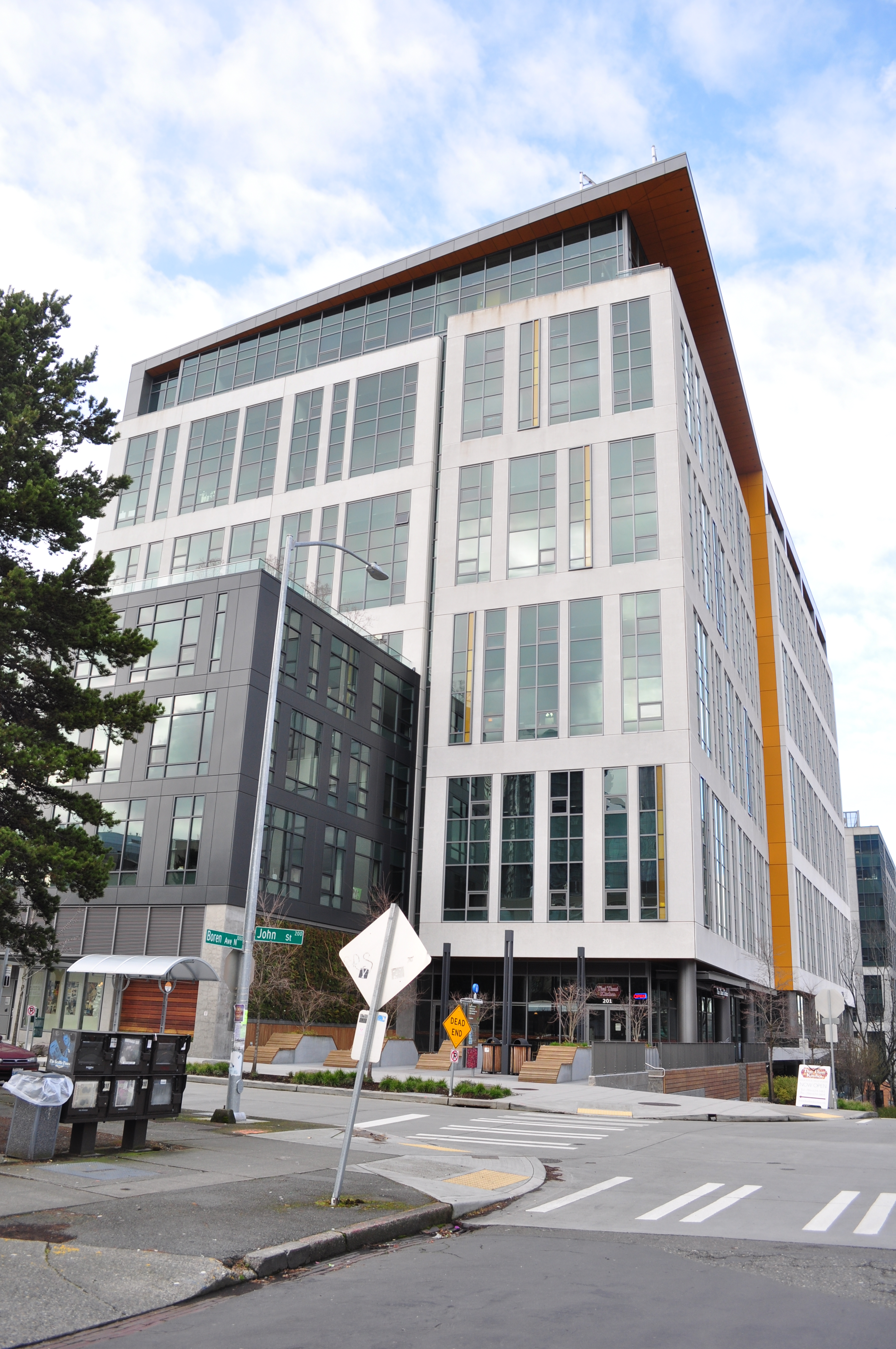
The Arizona Building, a typical example of recent construction in South Lake Union.

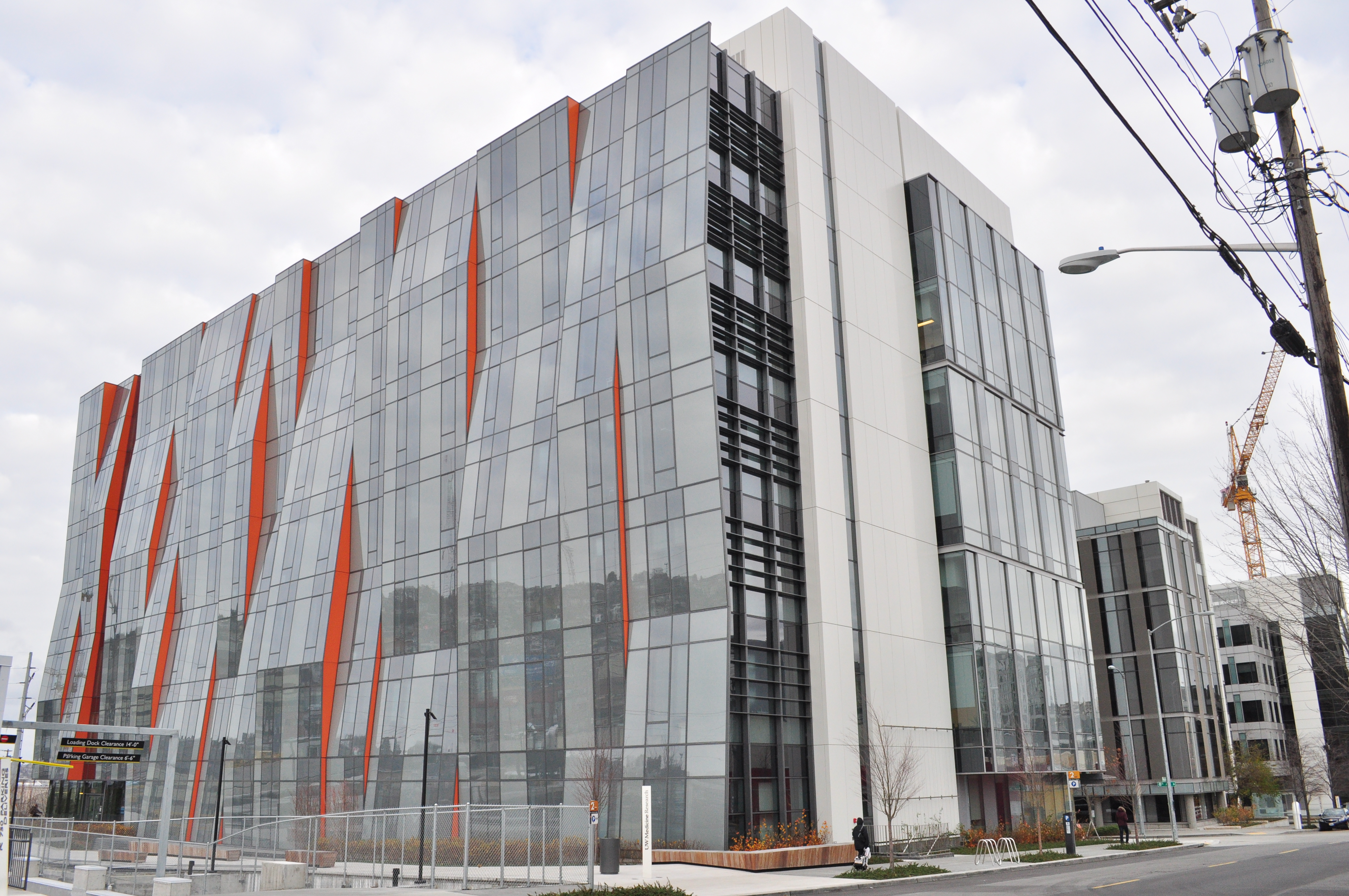
University of Washington Medicine Research building, South Lake Union (Perkins+Will, 2011–2013).

== Military architecture ==
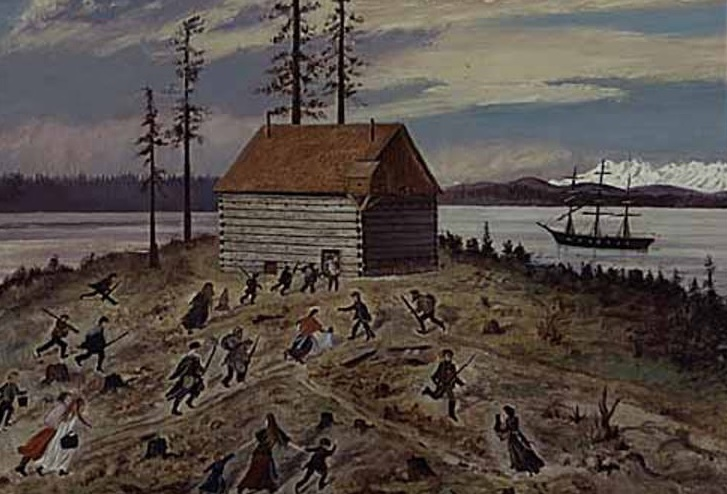
Artist's rendering of the blockhouse in which settlers sheltered in January 1856 during the Battle of Seattle in the Yakima War. USS Decatur is depicted offshore.

Seattle has connections to the United States military since the Battle of Seattle in 1856, and reached its present industrialized status in part as a result of World War II aircraft and shipbuilding industry. In addition to being a major seaport, shipyard, and industrial center with national importance, military installations such as Fort Lawton and Sand Point Naval Station and military-civilian infrastructure such as the Chittenden Locks and USCG Base Seattle, the Coast Guard District 13 headquarters, have been built in and around the city.

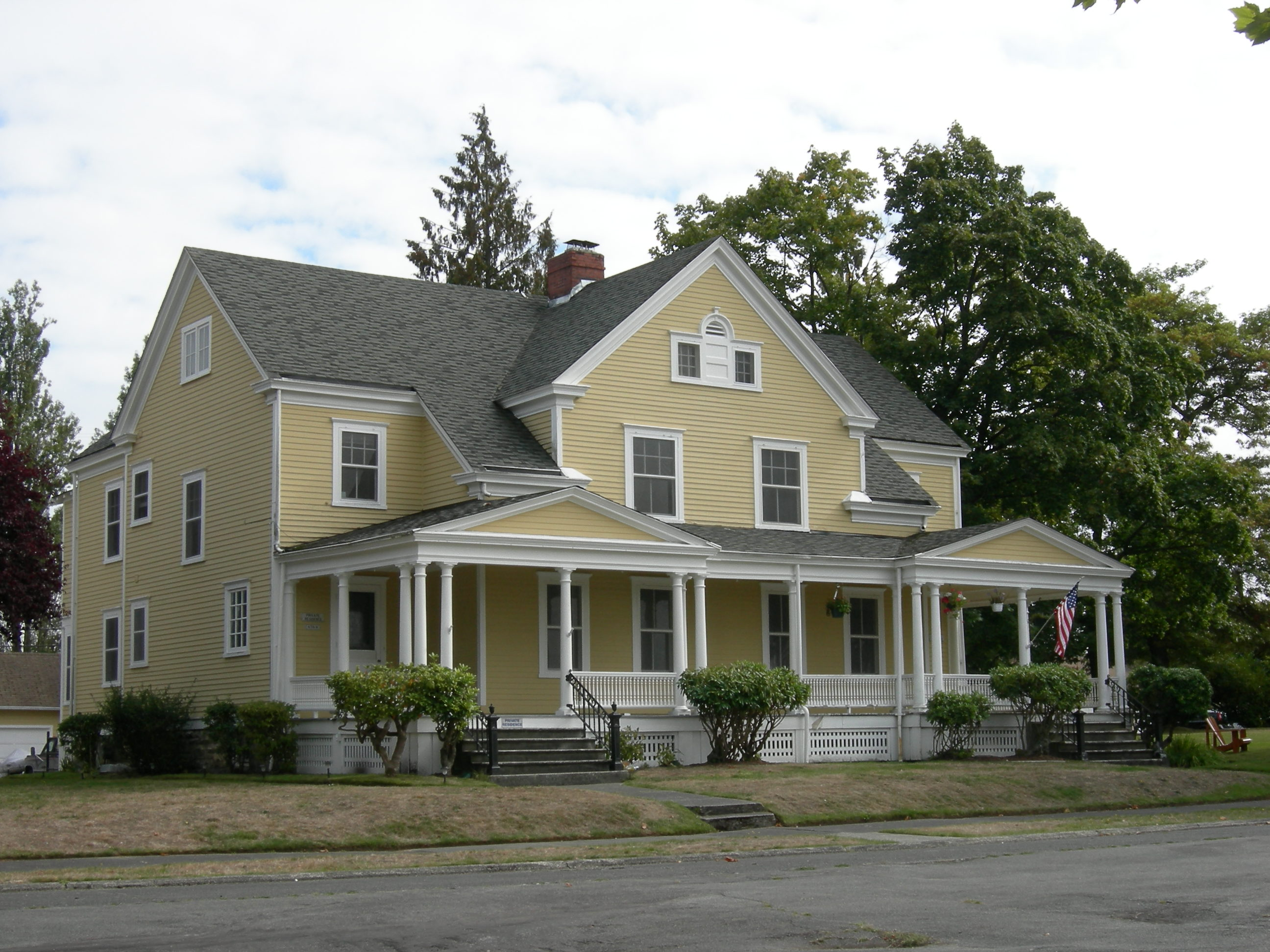
One of the six double officers' quarters at Fort Lawton (now Discovery Park)

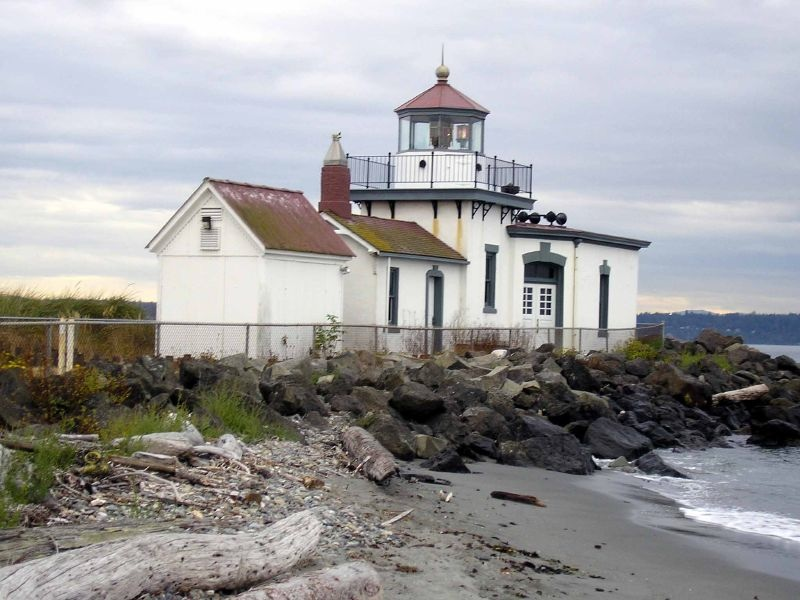
West Point Light, Fort Lawton

Fort Lawton, established 1900 and closed 2011, occupied 1,100 acres (450 ha) in Magnolia, on the bluffs overlooking Puget Sound to the west and Shilshole Bay to the north; approximately 59.3 acres (24.0 ha) of that now constitutes an official historic district within Discovery Park. The buildings were designed by the U.S. Army Quartermaster Corps and follow standardized plans. Among the surviving contributing structures in the historic district are six double officers' quarters and a single officers' quarters on Officer's Row (1899-1905), with garages added in the 1930s; six double NCO's quarters variously dating from 1899 into the 1930s; and various other buildings including two quartermaster stables (1902, 1908), a post exchange and gymnasium (1905) and a chapel (1942).

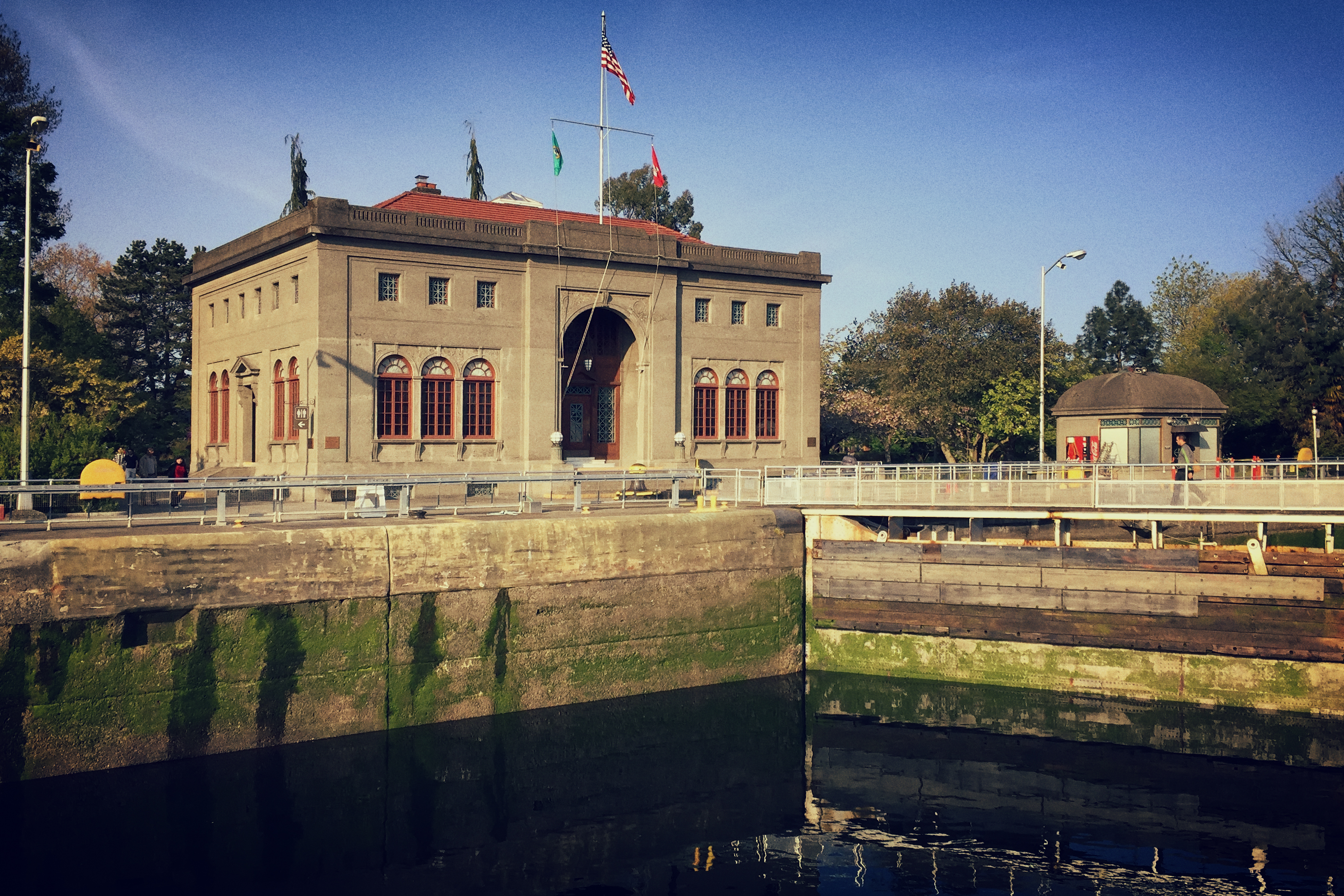
Administration Building, Ballard Locks, designed by Bebb and Gould, completed 1916.

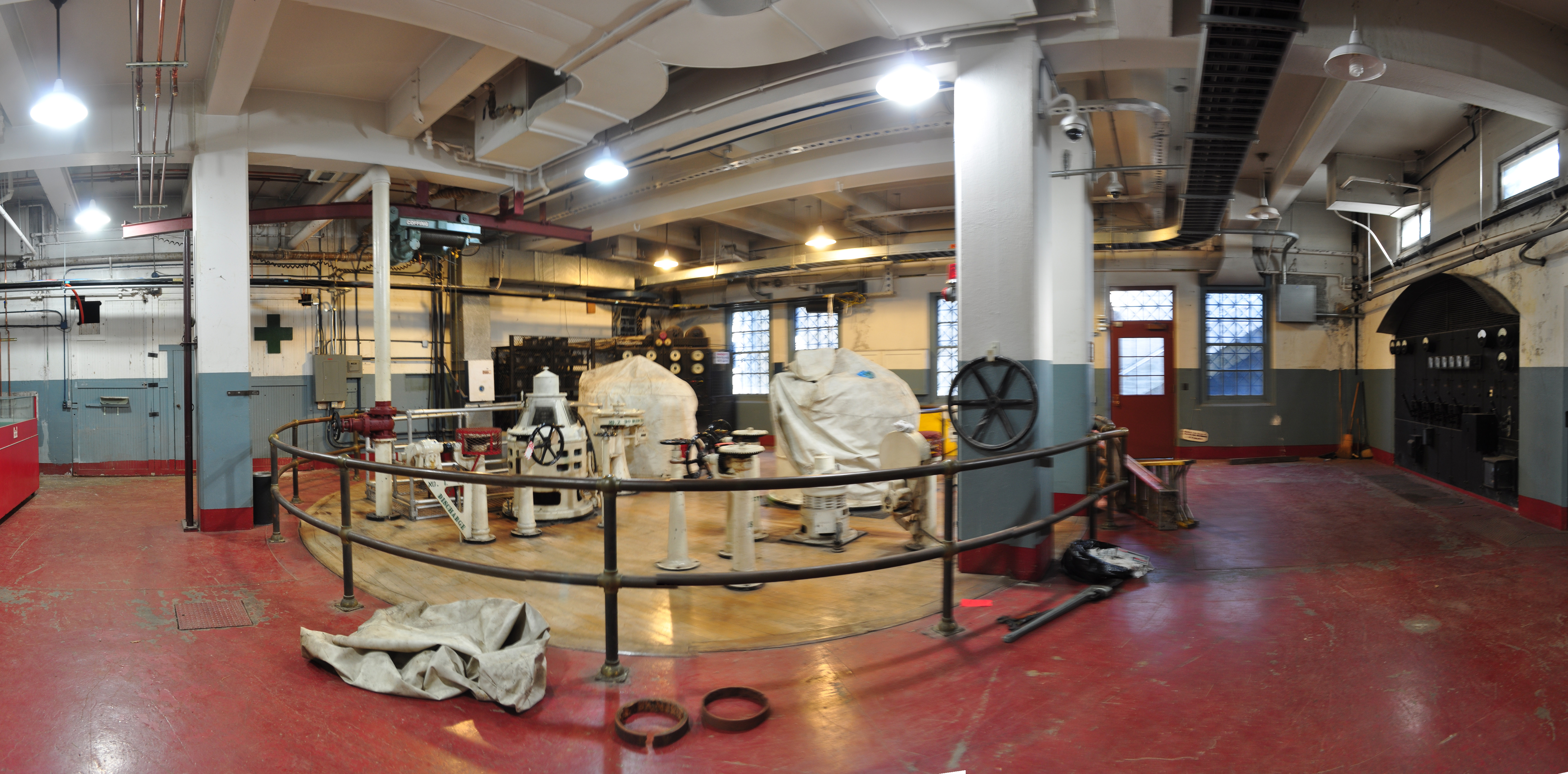
Underground control room for the locks

The Lake Washington Ship Canal and Ballard Locks (a.k.a. Hiram M. Chittenden Locks), opened in 1917, were funded by Washington state but built by the United States Army Corps of Engineers. The Administration Building for the locks was designed by prominent Seattle architects Bebb and Gould and completed 1916. The Renaissance Revival style building is a relatively early example of concrete construction, but also makes use of materials such as marble and oak; the light globes at the south entrance are supported by bronze sculptured dolphins. Under the building, in a series of basements, an extensive complex of pumps is used annually to empty the locks for cleaning. Another prominent building at the Locks is Cavanaugh House (1913), nestled in the Carl English Jr. Gardens. Originally intended as a home for an electrician to be handy to the locks, but since 1967 the official residence of the Chief Engineer of the Corps of Engineers Seattle District. It was the first completed structure of the Ship Canal project; the architect is unknown.

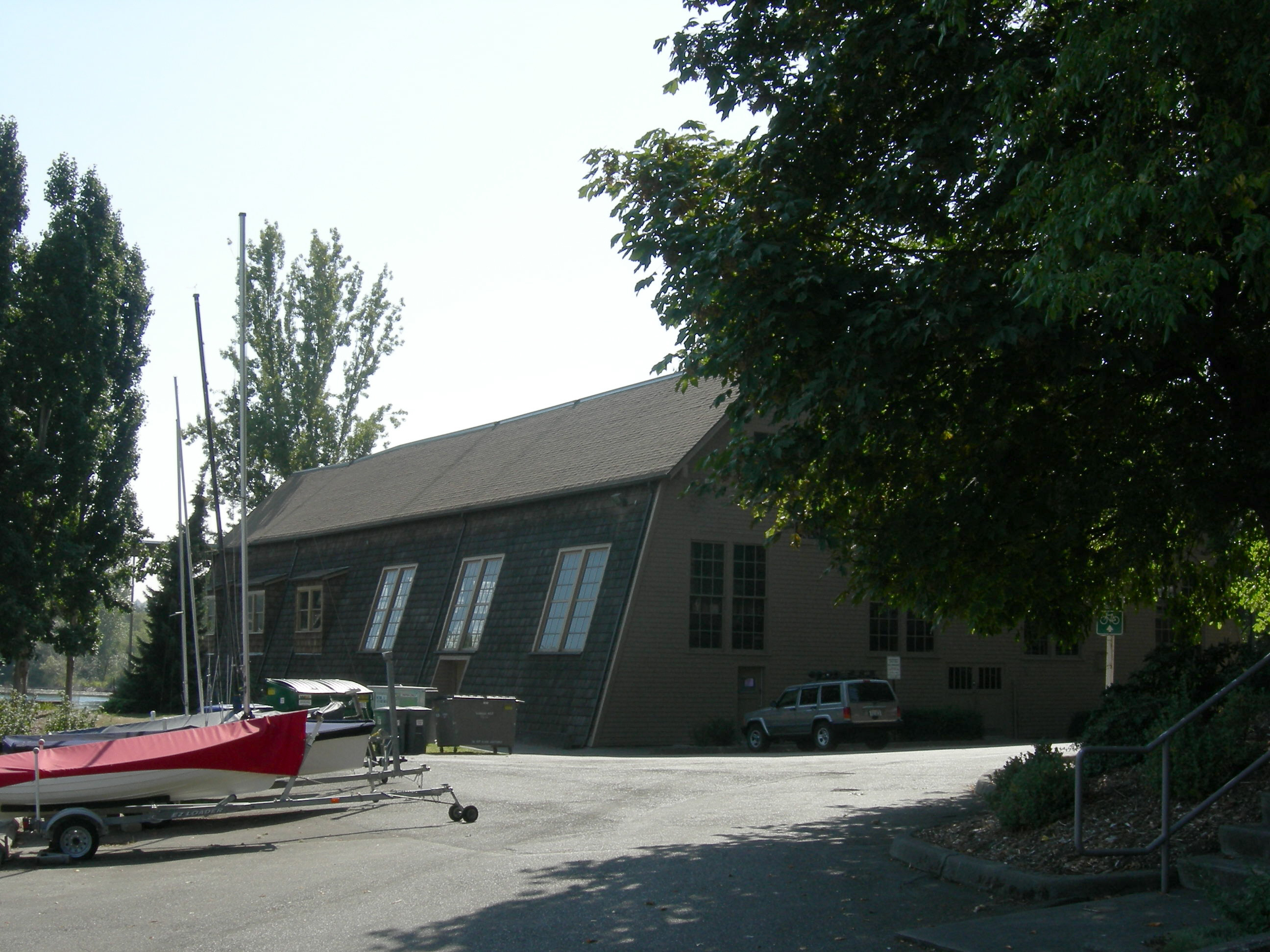
University of Washington boathouse

The University of Washington boathouse was built in 1918 by the U.S. Navy to serve as a hangar for the Aviation Training Corps, but never used it for that purpose. Instead, it served as storage for racing shells until 1949, and canoes since then. It was the first University of Washington structure to be placed on the National Register of Historic Places.

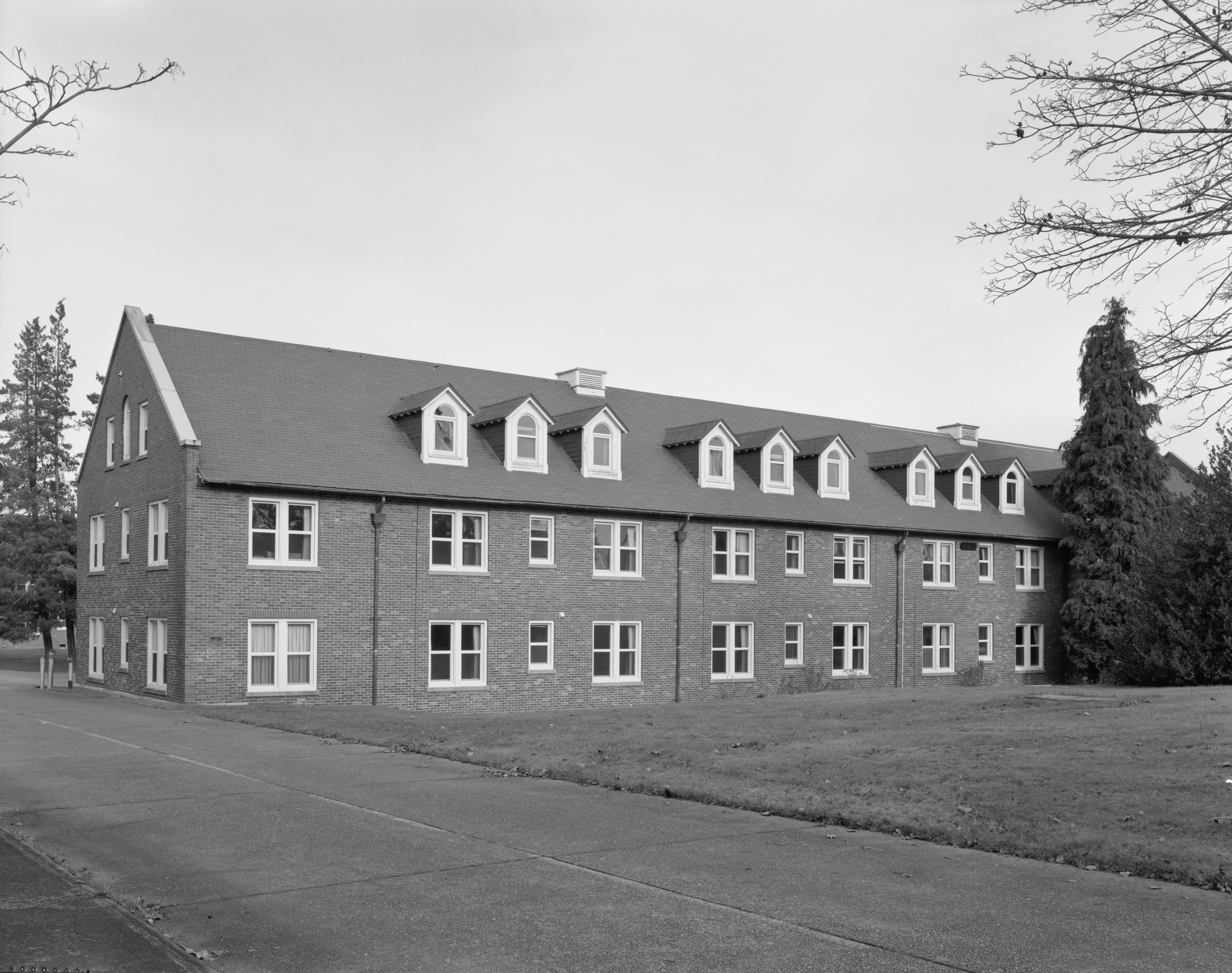
Building 26 South, Naval Station Puget Sound (Sand Point, now Magnuson Park)

Conceived from the outset as an air base, the Naval Station at Sand Point in northeast Seattle, north of the Windermere neighborhood on Lake Washington, came together in several steps in the 1920s; it underwent a series of name changes and reductions from 1970 until its final closure in 1995. As with Fort Lawton, a portion is now designated as a landmark district. The landmark district includes Art Deco, Art Moderne and Colonial Revival style buildings, vernacular industrial and military buildings, and Public Works Administration and Works Progress Administration buildings. Buildings range from airplane hangars, seaplane facilities, and a torpedo shop to officers' quarters and a beach shelter. A portion of the former military facility is now the National Oceanic and Atmospheric Administration Western Regional Center; the bulk of it constitutes Magnuson Park. Much of the NCO and enlisted men's housing is now various forms of social housing. Building 29, a red brick Colonial Revival style barracks with white trim, composed of a series of linked pavilions, is currently (as of 2017) being converted by Mercy Housing Northwest under a plan by Tonkin Architects into 148 apartments for families and individuals with income between 30% and 60% of area median income.

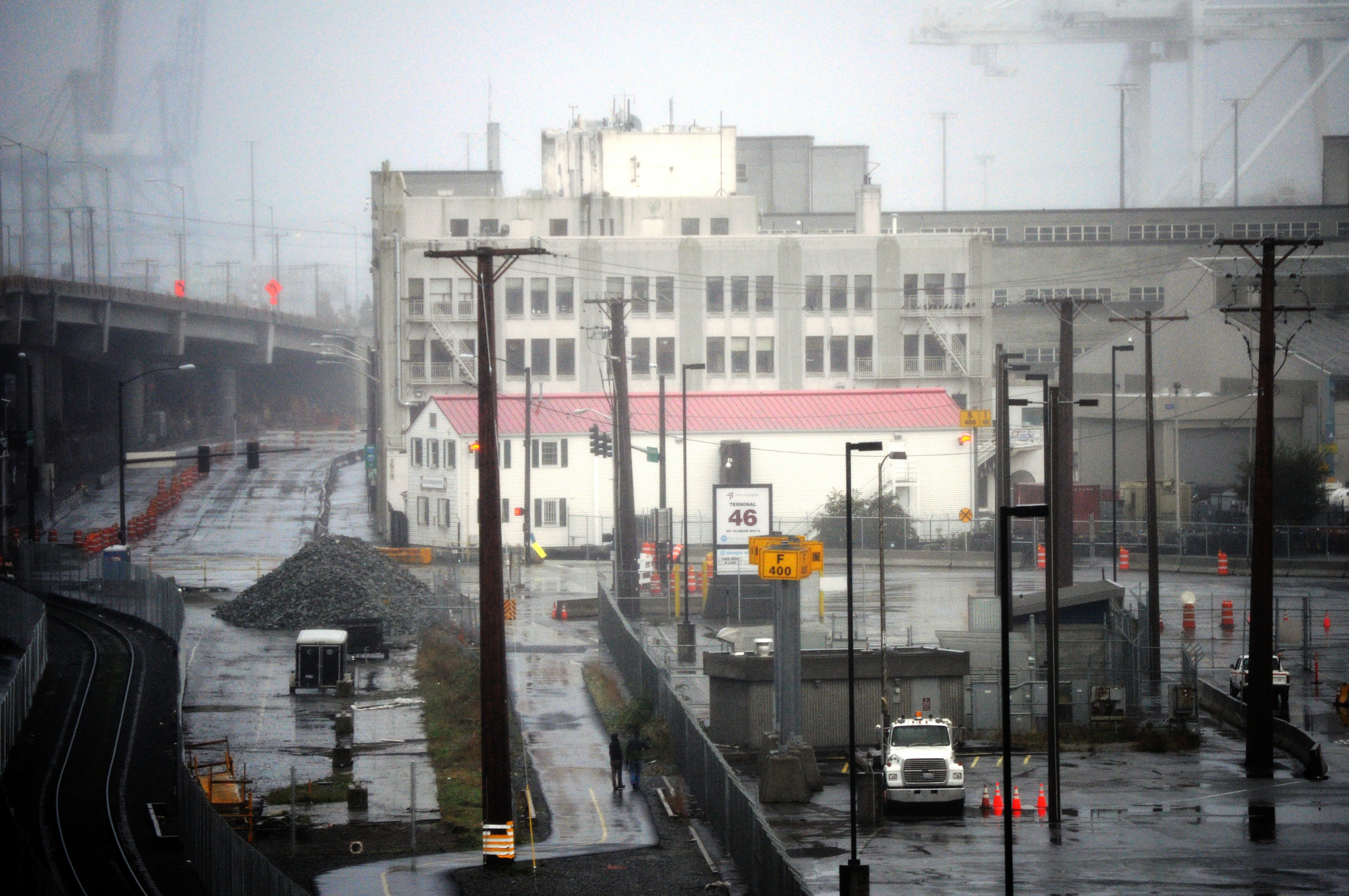
Coast Guard District 13 headquarters, Pier 36/37, from the north. Coast Guard Museum (1925) in front, then the former Pacific Steamship Company building (1925), then the warehouse (1941) that is an early example of Brutalist architecture.

Although Fort Lawton and the Sand Point Naval Station have both closed and been largely converted into parks, Coast Guard District 13 headquarters (Coast Guard Base Seattle), remains on Pier 36/37. Unlike Fort Lawton and Sand Point, this was not entirely a purpose-built military facility. The main building on Pier 36 was built in 1925 for the Pacific Steamship Company, which went out of business in 1936. The federal government acquired and expanded the facility in 1940-1941 as a port of embarkation for troops shipping overseas; one building built at that time is the present-day Coast Guard Museum Northwest; another, 1561 Alaskan Way, originally the U. S. Army Terminal Warehouse, is an early example of brutalist architecture. In 1960 it became an Army Corps of Engineers district headquarters, then passed briefly to the Port of Seattle in 1965 before the Coast Guard consolidated its Seattle operations there in 1966.

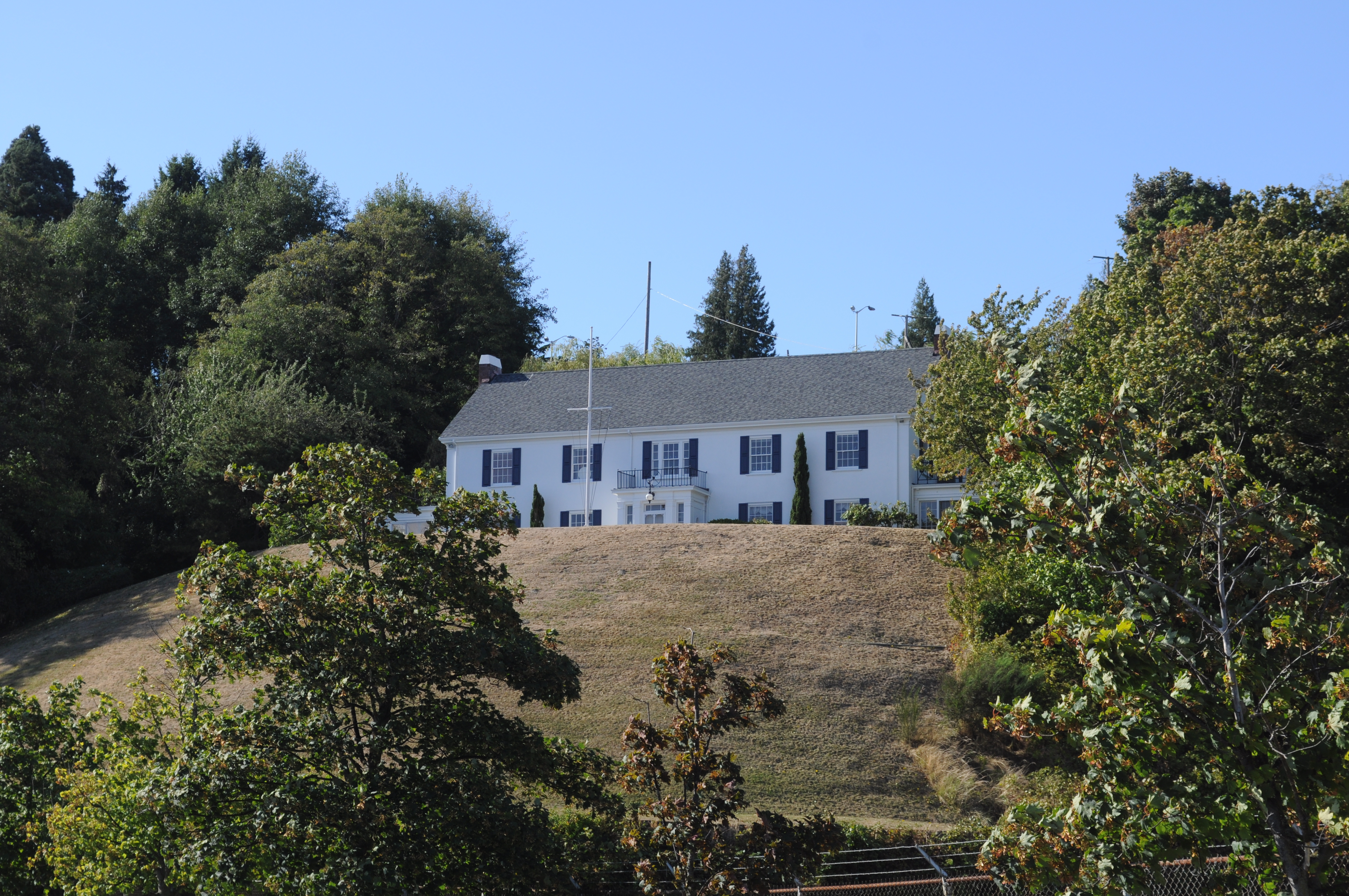
Admiral's House

Prior to (and for some time after) the acquisition of Pier 36/37, the Coast Guard made use of Pier 91 at Smith Cove. During and after World War II, there was a 253-acre (102 ha) Naval Supply Depot at Smith Cove and on the landfill just to its north. The facility was used by various military branches until 1970, with at least some Navy presence until 1977; most of the facility was purchased by the Port of Seattle in 1974. At its height during World War II, the Depot included 53 acres (21 ha) of covered storage space (including several cold storage buildings), and a Naval Receiving Station also on the site included 20 enlisted men's barracks, 2 women's barracks for WAVES, mess halls, recreation halls, an indoor swimming pool, and a hospital. For the most part, the Smith Cove buildings were warehouses or industrial sheds. Except for some older (1925) buildings built by the Texas Oil Co., most were designed by the Navy's Department of Public Works, although at least one is attributed to "A. Smith" at Seattle's J.H. Bluechel Co. The Admiral's House on the Magnolia Bluffs overlooked the depot from West. Built in 1944, it continued as a commander's residence for some time after the Depot closed. It was closed in 2006, and was sold in 2013.

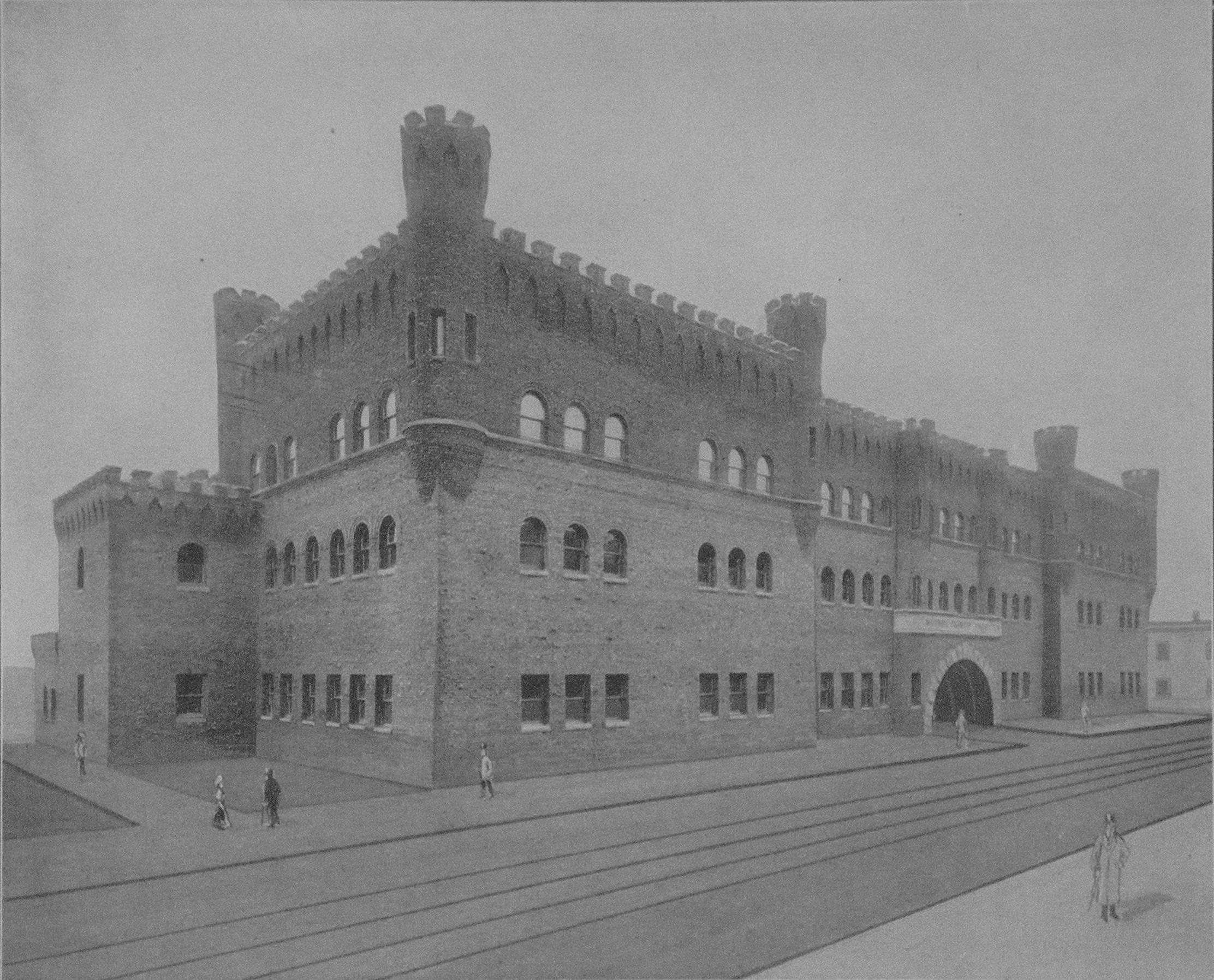
The Washington National Guard Armory sat at the north end of Pike Place Market from 1909 until its demolition in 1968.

The present-day Washington State National Guard Armory at Smith Cove is a 1973 Brutalist building of no particular architectural distinction. However, Seattle was previously home to least four prominent armory buildings, two of which survive in other uses. An armory built in 1888 on Union Street between Third and Fourth Avenues served as a temporary seat for the city government after the Great Seattle Fire the following year. From 1909 to 1968, a "fortress-like" Washington National Guard Armory sat on Western Avenue at the north end of Pike Place Market, roughly the site of present-day Victor Steinbrueck Park. It boasted a castellated parapet, round corner turrets, thick red-brown brick walls and a Romanesque-style arched stone entranceway with a wrought iron portcullis. The architect is not known.

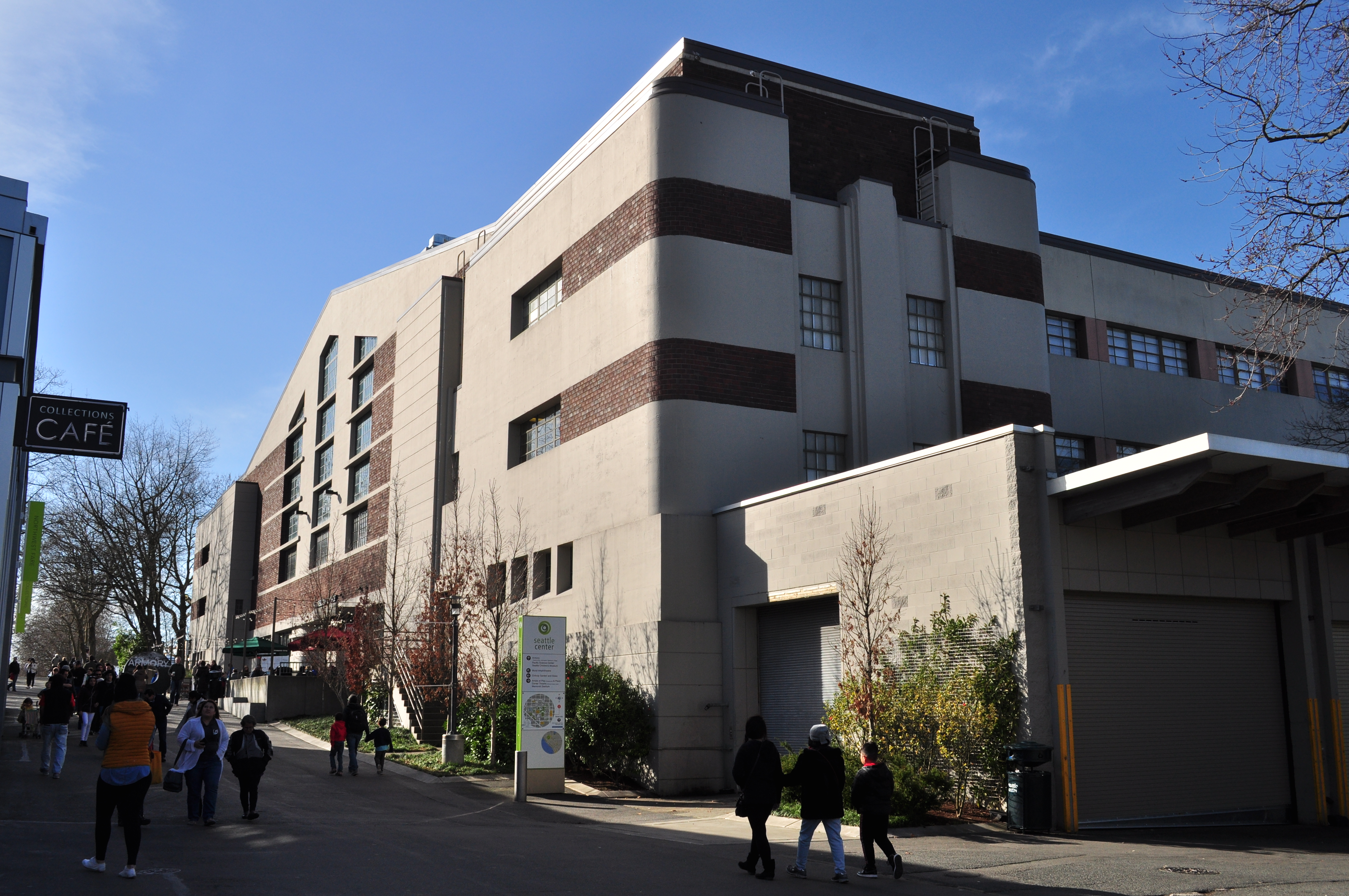
The Seattle Center Armory, built 1939, now houses a food court.

A later (1939) armory at Seattle Center initially served both the National Guard (part of which continued to use the old facility) and the 146th Field Artillery. Like its predecessors, which besides military uses had been used for everything from dances to car shows, it also served as a place of entertainment—Duke Ellington played there in 1941—and served other public purposes, for example as the site of the 1948 Canwell Committee hearings in Seattle. The Streamline Moderne poured-concrete building was designed by Floyd Naramore (later a founder of NBBJ) and Arrigo M. Young. Incorporated in 1962 into the grounds of the Century 21 Exposition and later Seattle Center, with its main floor turned into a food court, it was successively known as the Food Circus (1962) and Center House (early 1970s) before becoming known again as The Armory (2012). A sub-basement, closed to the public, still contains a disused rifle range and a never-completed pool intended for use by the recruits.

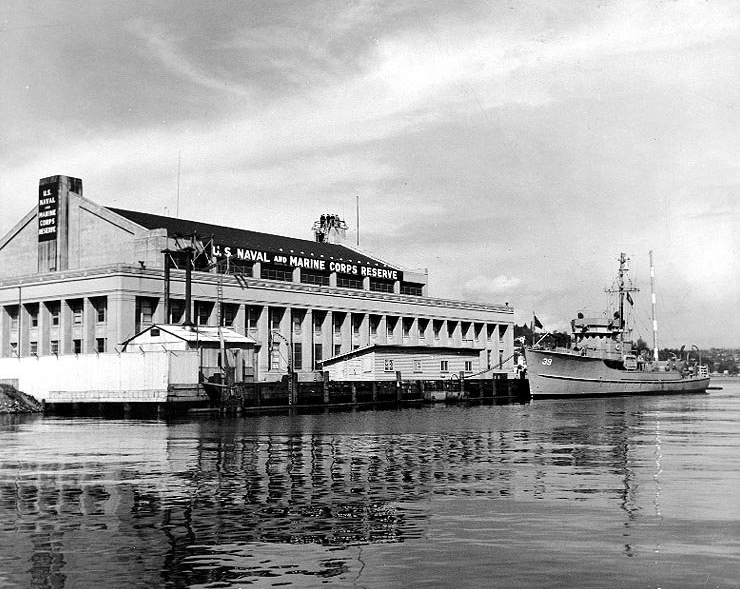
Naval Reserve Armory on Lake Union, circa 1950...

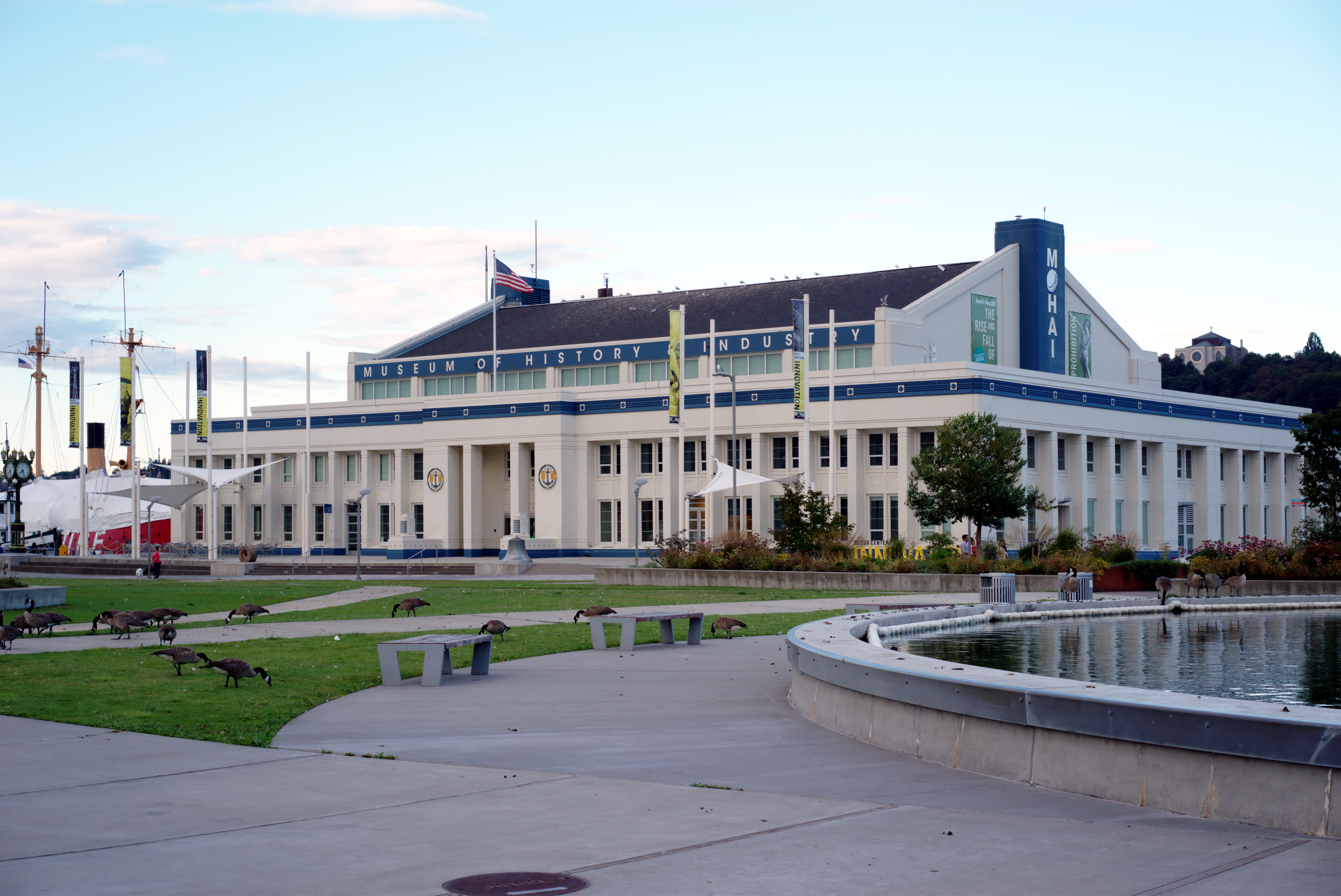
...and in 2015 as the Museum of History and Industry

Dating from the same era, the former Naval Reserve Armory (1940–1942) is located on a wharf on the south shore of Lake Union. Designed by B. Marcus Priteca and William R. Grant and built by the Work Projects Administration, it is the only military building associated with either architect. Like the Army Reserve Building, it is built of concrete, with "restrained Art Deco and Moderne features." Some strategically placed "porthole" windows help give it a nautical tone.

It served as an Advanced Naval Training school during World War II. During the war, numerous barracks buildings were built nearby; all were torn down shortly after the war; some other nearby wartime buildings lasted as long as 1958. After the war, the building was used by both the United States Navy Reserve and Marine Forces Reserve. Like Seattle's several Army Reserve armories, it was used for many non-military purposes, ranging from Kiwanis meetings to garden clubs. In 1998, the land passed back to the City of Seattle, which had originally provided the site. It is now home to the Museum of History and Industry.

== Religious buildings ==
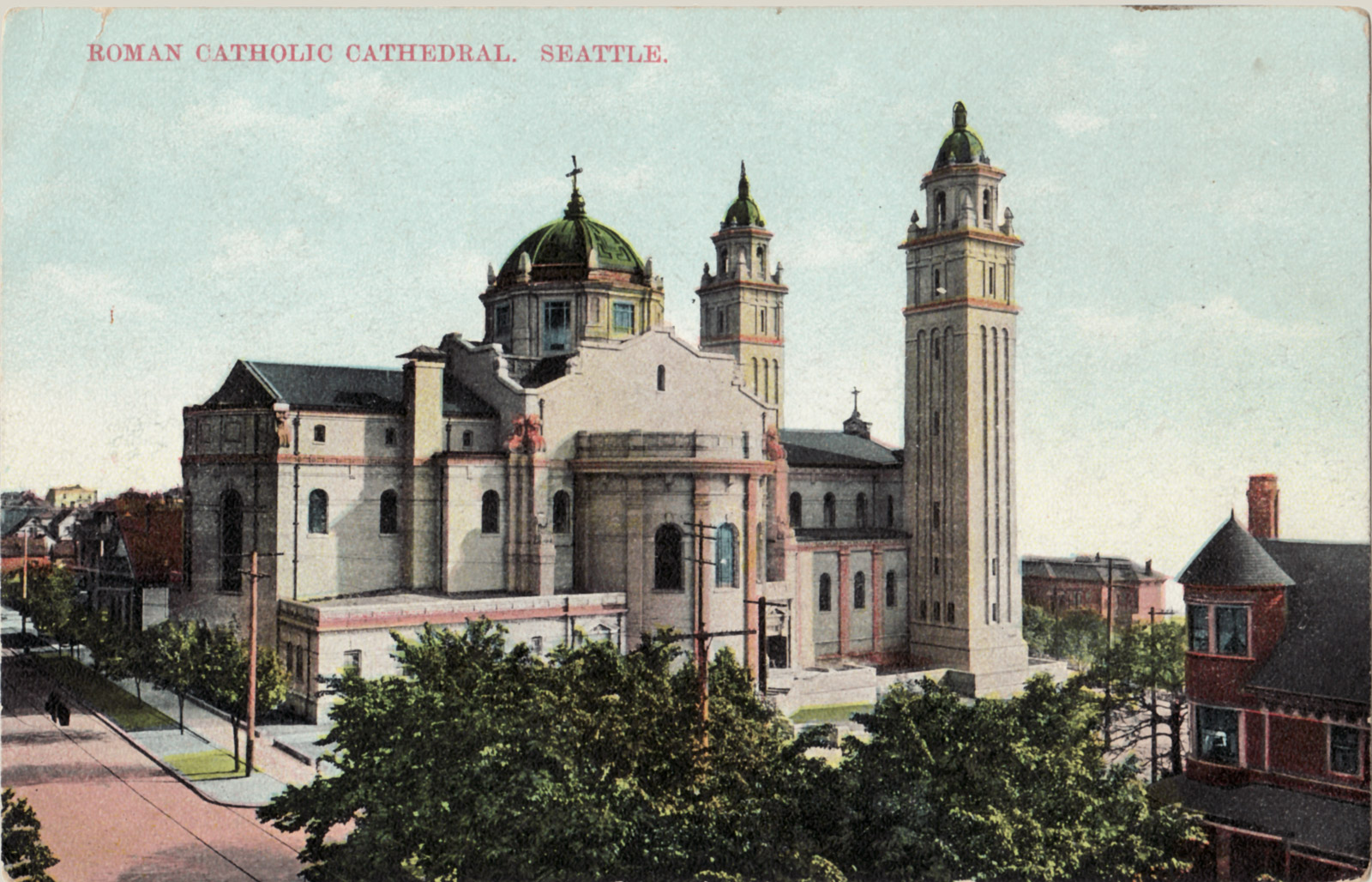
This early postcard of St. James Cathedral (Roman Catholic, built 1907) shows it with its original dome; the dome collapsed from snow in 1916 and was never rebuilt.

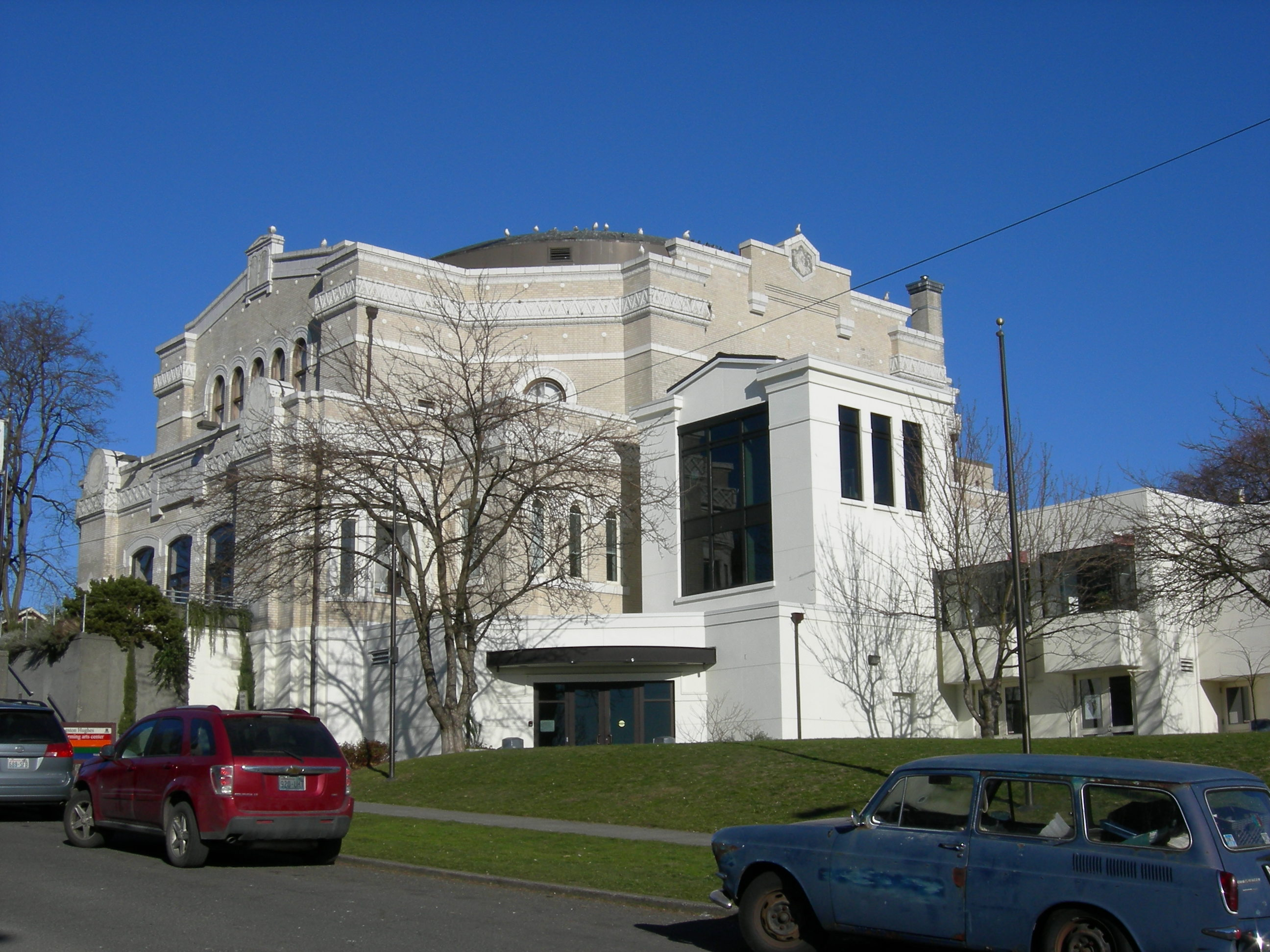
The Langston Hughes Performing Arts Center in the Central District, originally the Bikur Cholim synagogue (B. Marcus Priteca, 1915)

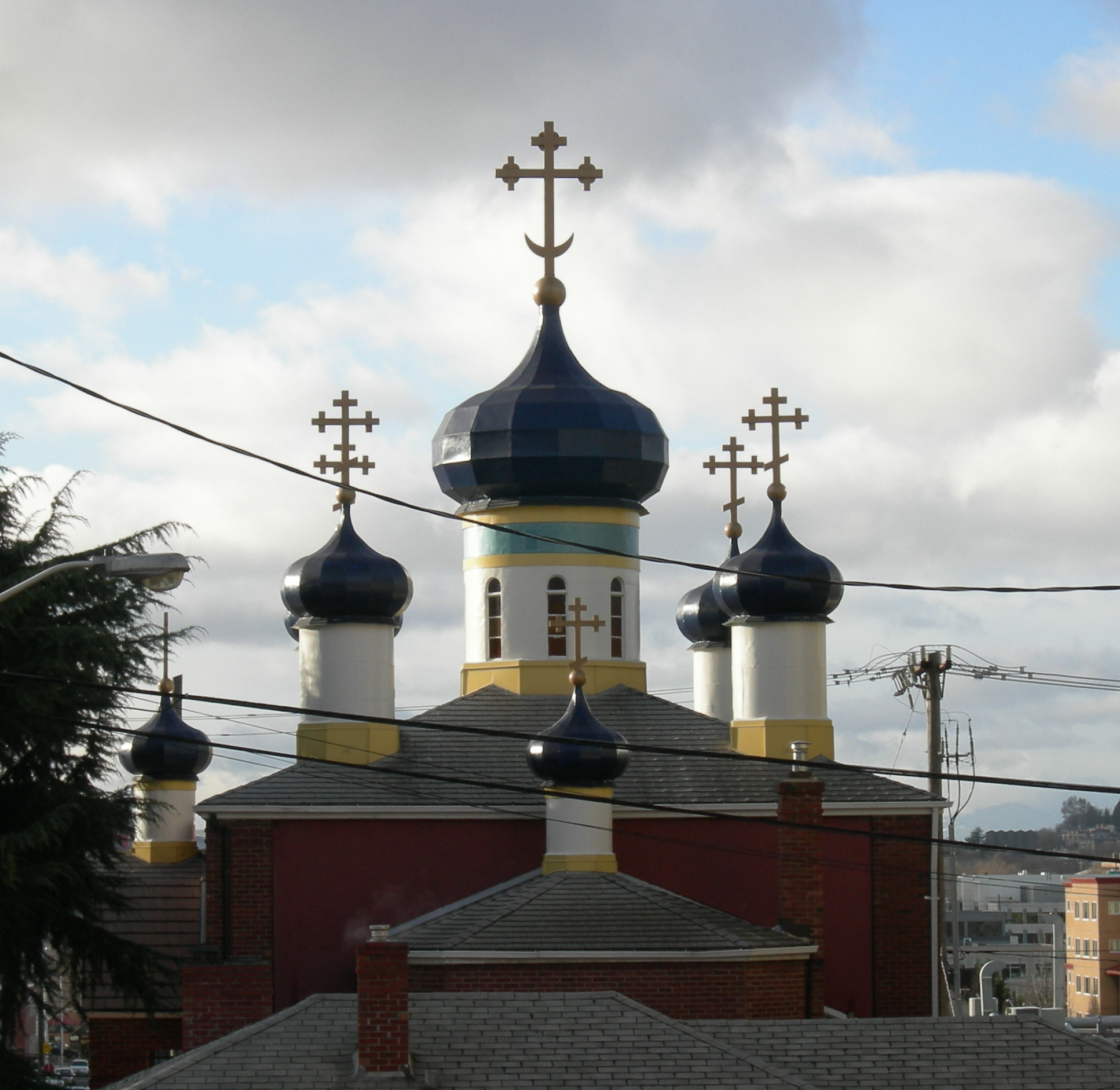
The onion domes of Saint Spiridon Orthodox Cathedral, built in 1941 in Cascade, evoke the churches of northern Russia.

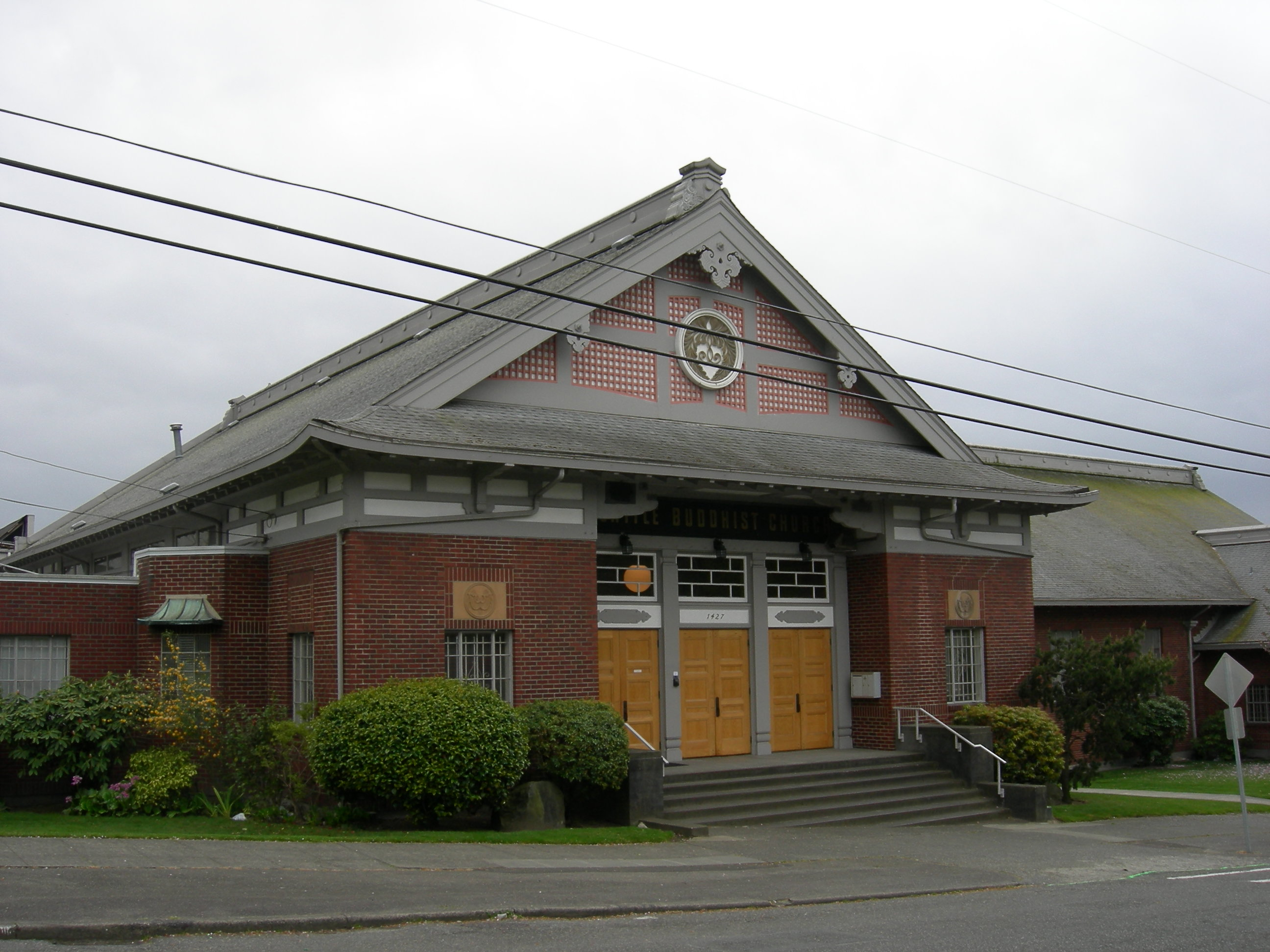
Seattle Betsuin Buddhist Temple (1940–1941), a Japanese Jodo Shinshu Buddhist temple, designed by Japanese American Kichio Allen Arai. The architect of record was Pierce A. Horrocks, because Arai lacked an architectural license.

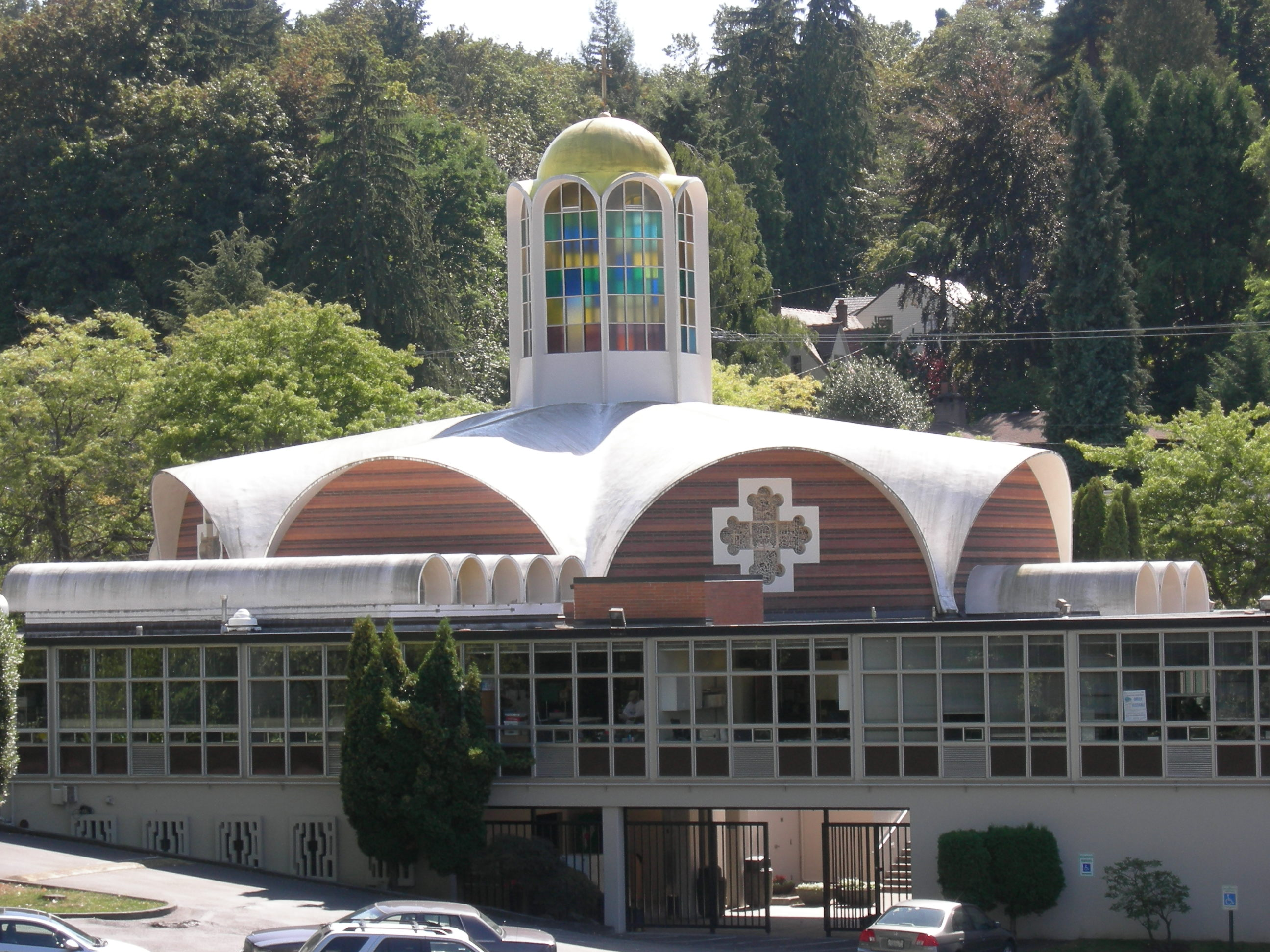
St. Demetrios Greek Orthodox Church in Montlake, designed by Paul Thiry and completed in 1962, the same year as the World's Fair for which he was principal architect

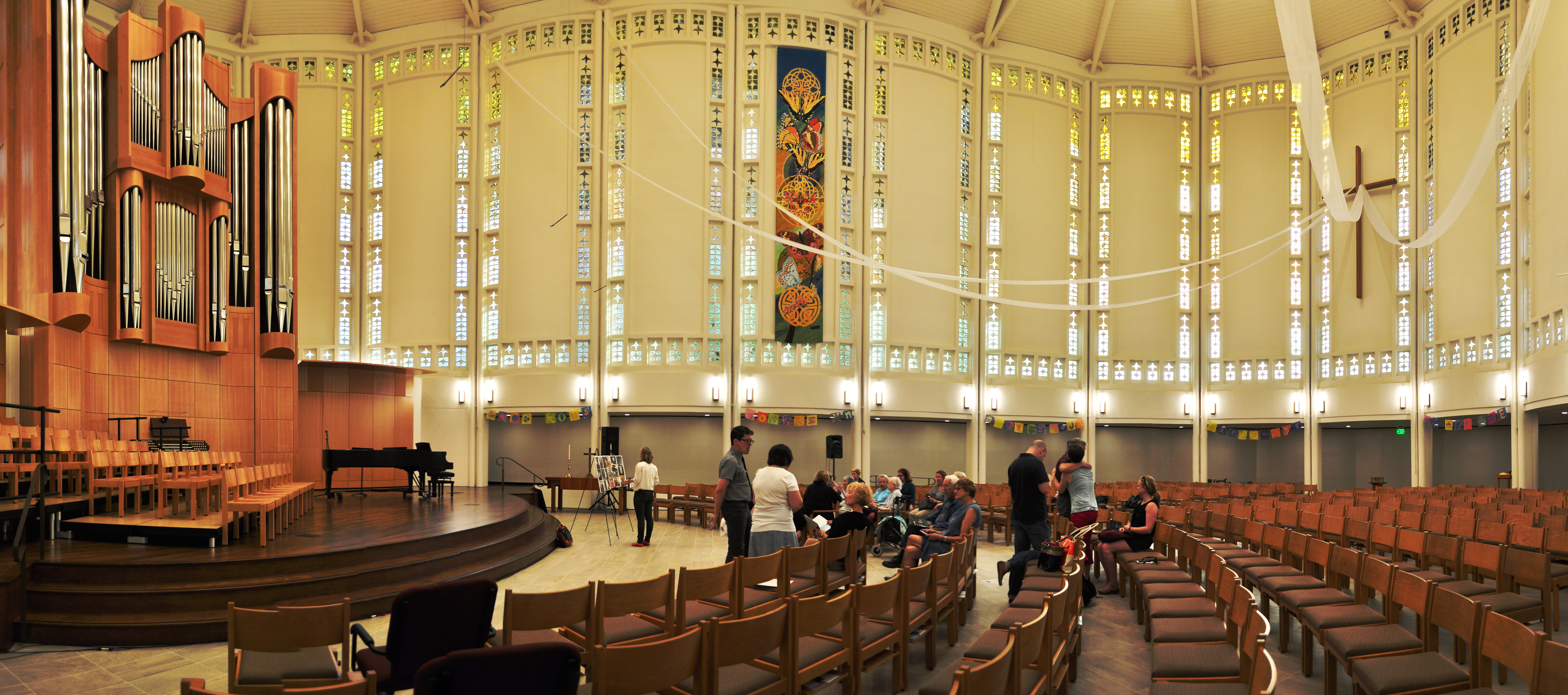
Interior of the NBBJ-designed Plymouth Congregational Church (built 1967–1968) in the Metropolitan Tract. Principal architect Donald Arthur Winkelmann.

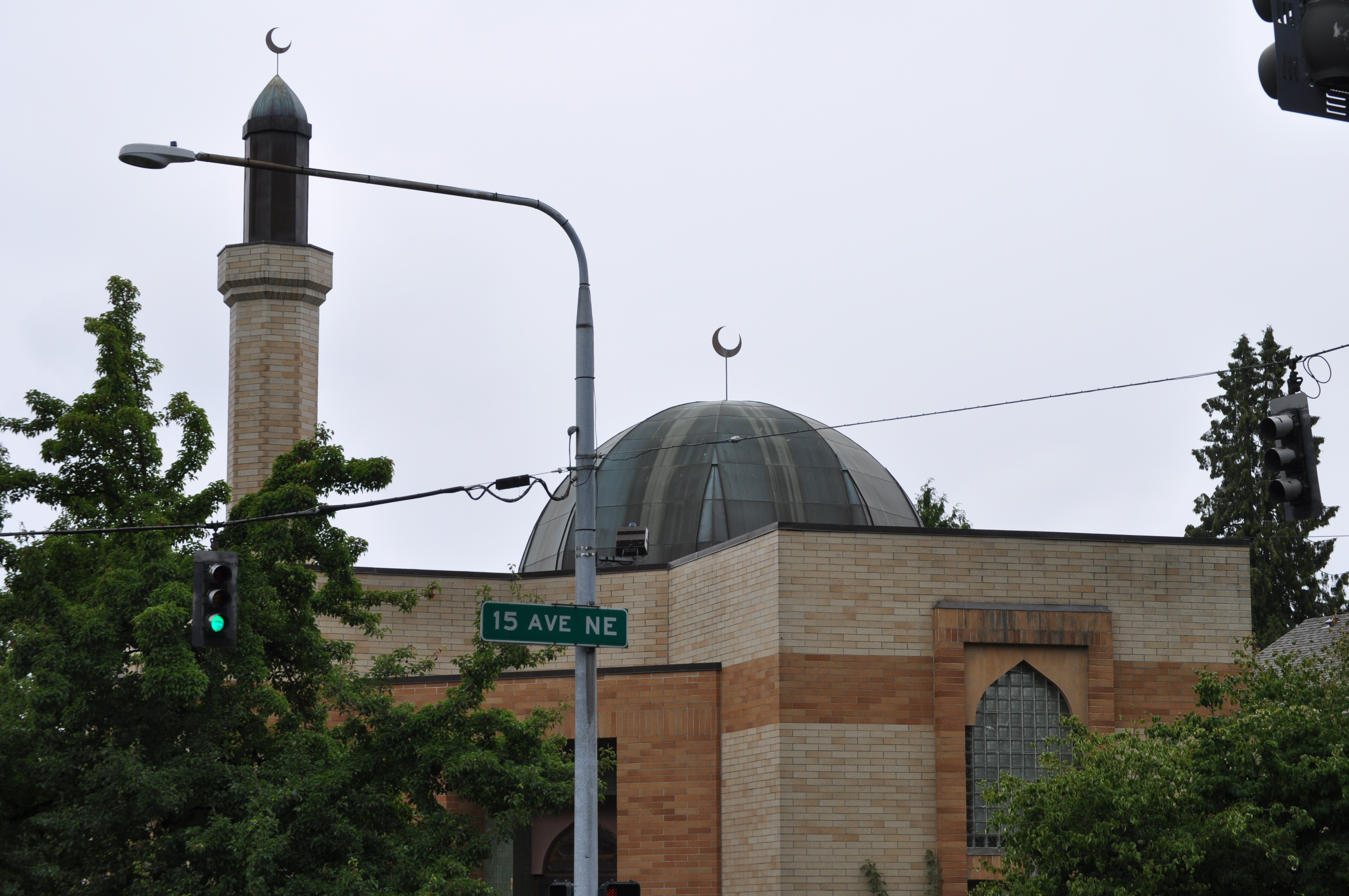
The Idriss (or Idris) Mosque in Northgate (Dennis Alkire, Mithun Associates, 1981)

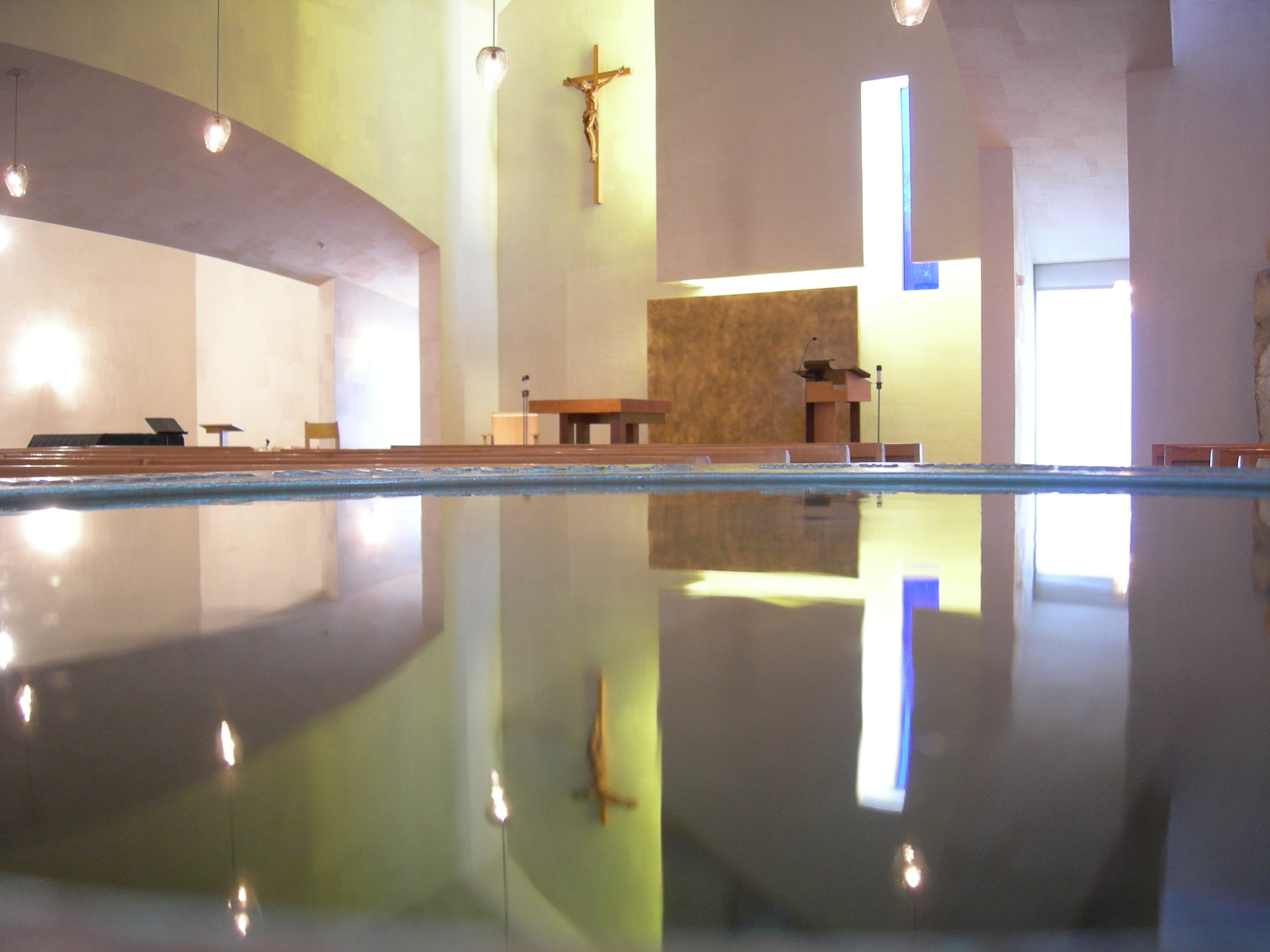
Interior, Chapel of St. Ignatius, Seattle University, designed by Steven Holl and 1994–1997, "seven bottles of light in a stone box"

== Libraries and museums ==
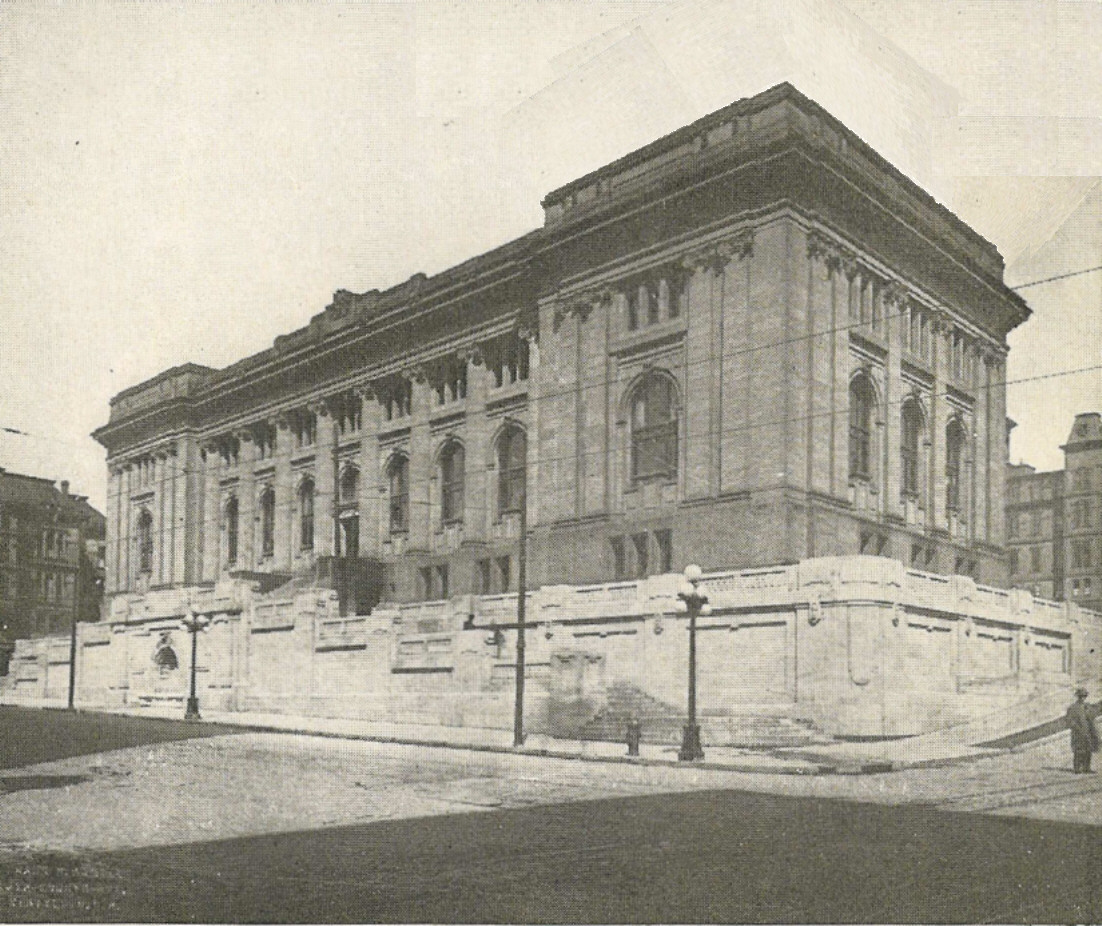
Seattle Public Library (SPL) old Downtown Carnegie Library, photographed here in 1919.

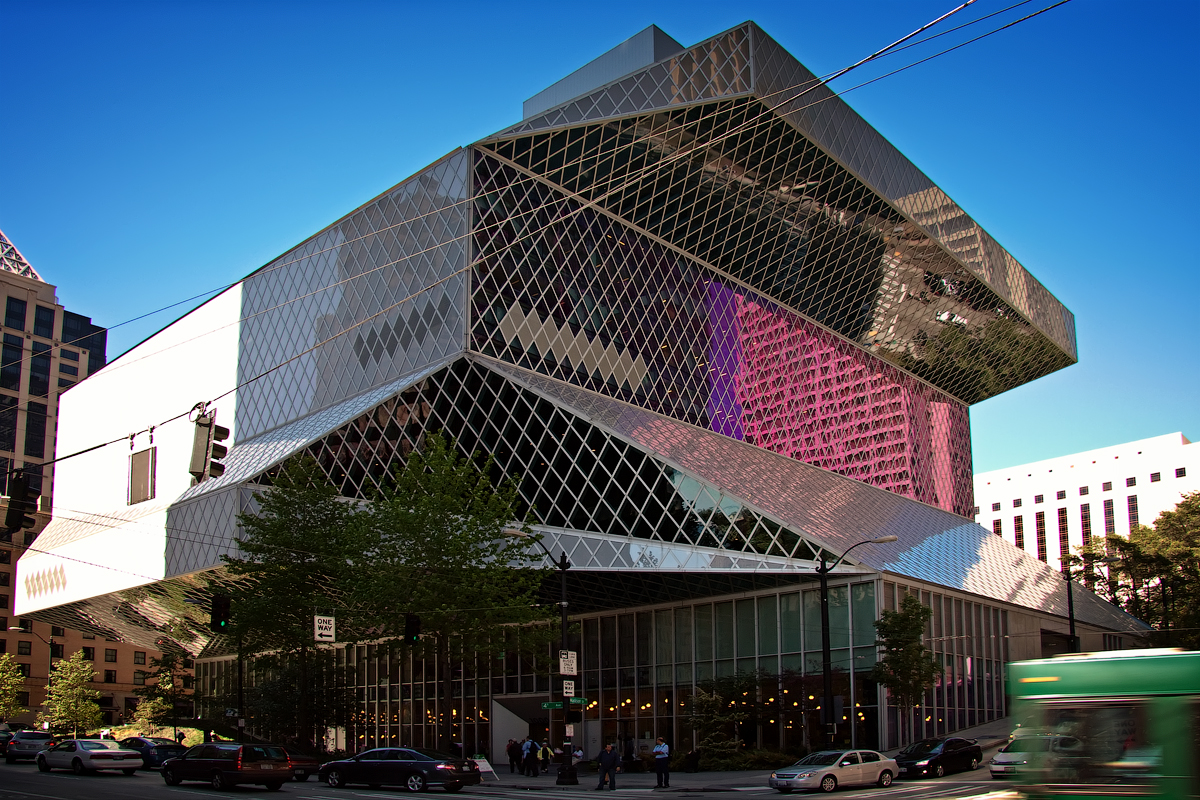
SPL Central Library, designed by Rem Koolhaas and completed in 2004

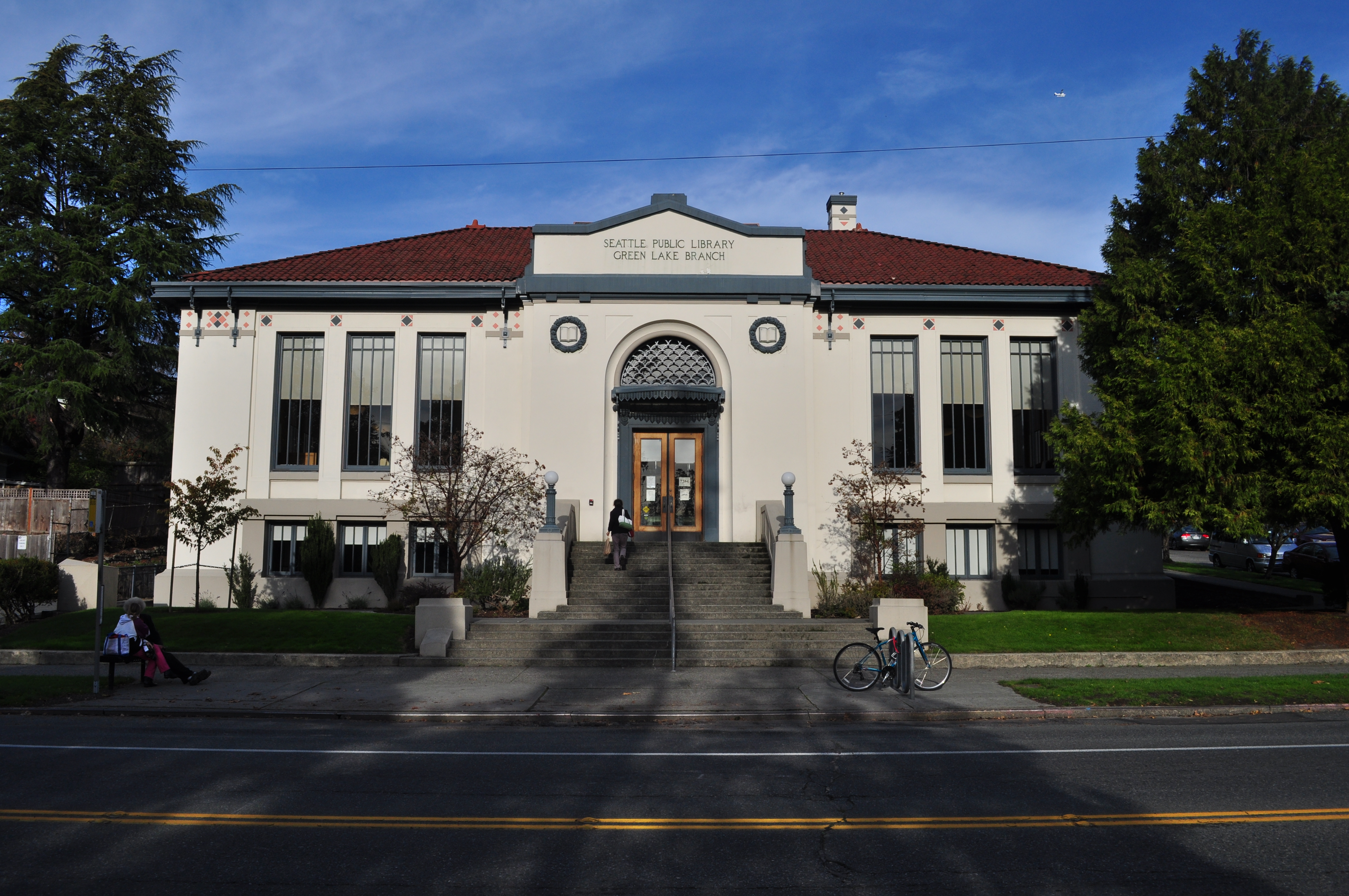
SPL Green Lake branch, one of half a dozen surviving Carnegie libraries in Seattle.

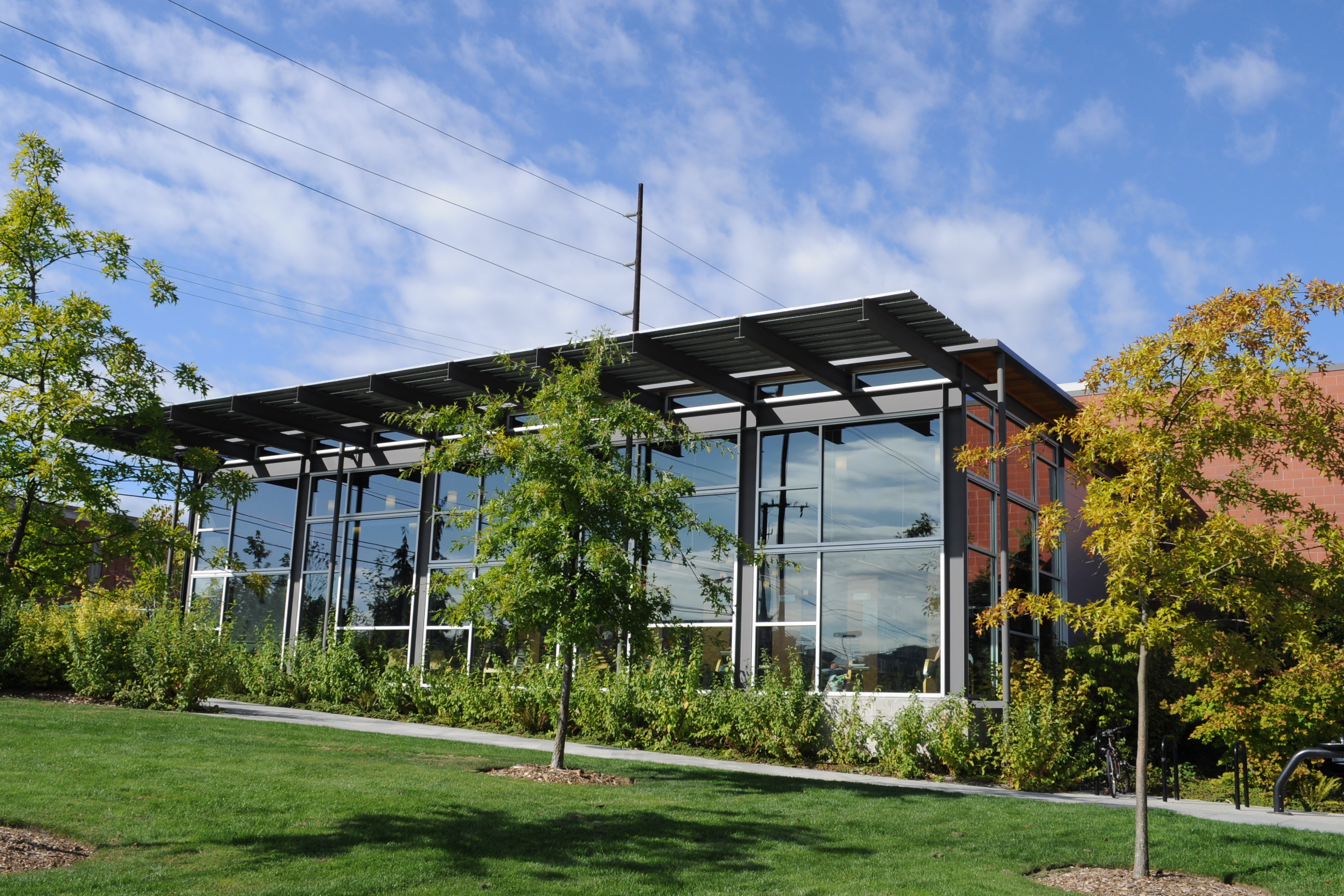
SPL Northgate Branch Library

The present-day Seattle Public Library has a Central Library (completed 2004) designed by Rem Koolhaas and 26 branch libraries. The current Central Library is the third on the site, preceded by a Beaux-Arts Carnegie library (built 1904–1906, demolished 1957) designed by Peter J. Weber, a German-born architect from Chicago and an International Style replacement opened 1960, with Bindon & Wright as the primary architect and Decker Christenson & Kitchin as associated architects. Six present-day public library branches (West Seattle, Green Lake, University, Queen Anne, Columbia, Fremont) are Carnegie libraries opened between 1910 and 1921; a former Carnegie library in Ballard, predating Ballard's annexation by Seattle, is now a bar and restaurant. Also from that era, Douglass-Truth, originally Yesler, was the first branch library financed by Seattle itself. After that came a hiatus in public library construction lasting more than three decades. As a result, most of the other present-day branches are Modernist buildings, including North East (Paul Thiry, 1954, altered), Magnolia (Paul Hayden Kirk, 1964, altered), and Lake City (John Morse, 1965, altered), all of which are officially designated city landmarks.

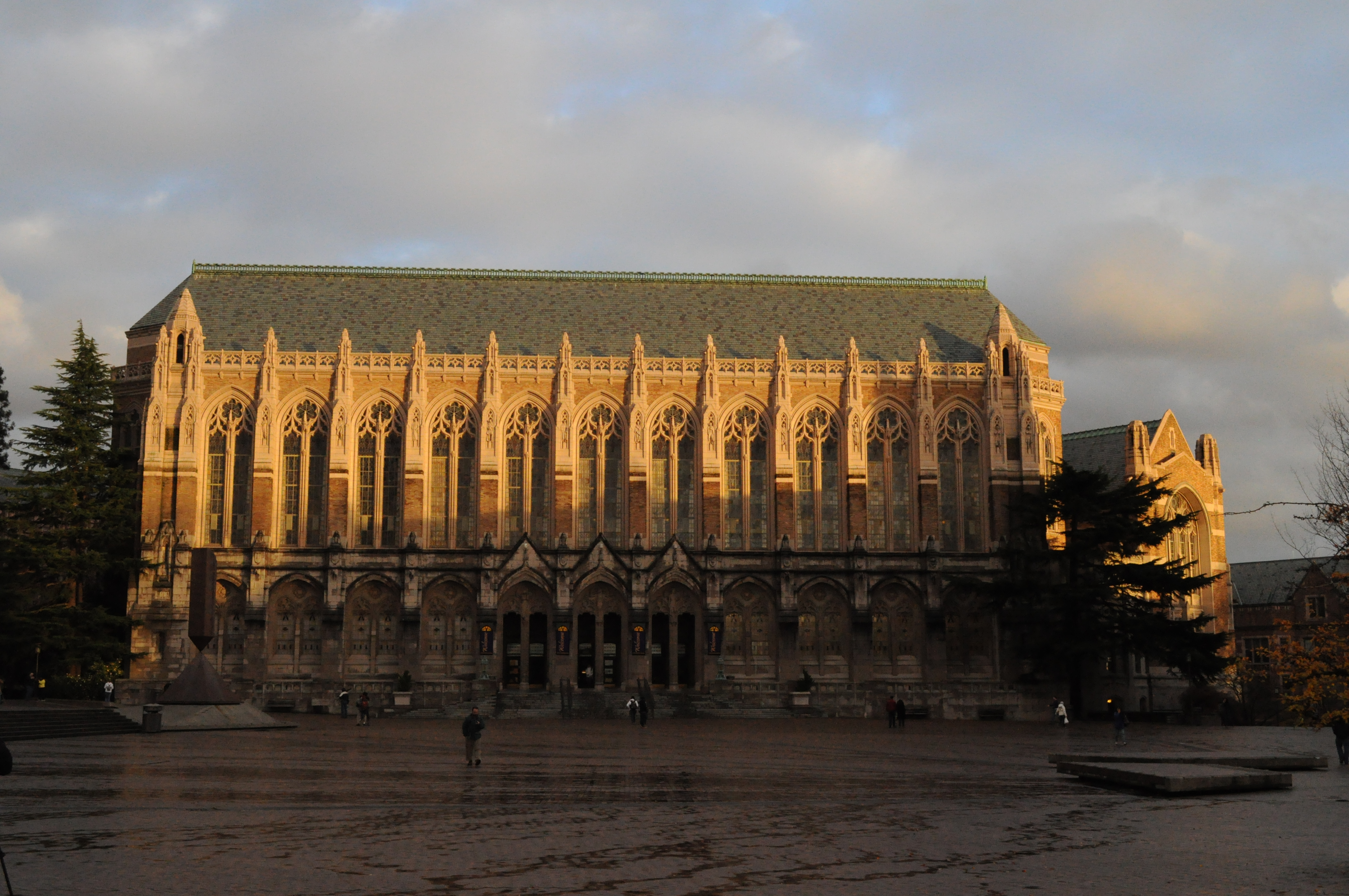
Suzzallo Library (first phase completed 1926), University of Washington, designed by Bebb and Gould.

There are also numerous libraries at the University of Washington, Lemieux Library at Seattle University, various other college and university libraries, and specialized libraries such as a Coast Guard library. Some of these have purpose-built buildings (such as the Collegiate Gothic building of Suzzallo Library, designed by Charles H. Bebb and Carl F. Gould; west wing 1926, south wing 1935), others adapted existing buildings as libraries (such as the Washington Talking Book & Braille Library, a former Dodge dealership designed in Streamline Moderne style by the precursor firm to present-day NBBJ and built 1947-1948).

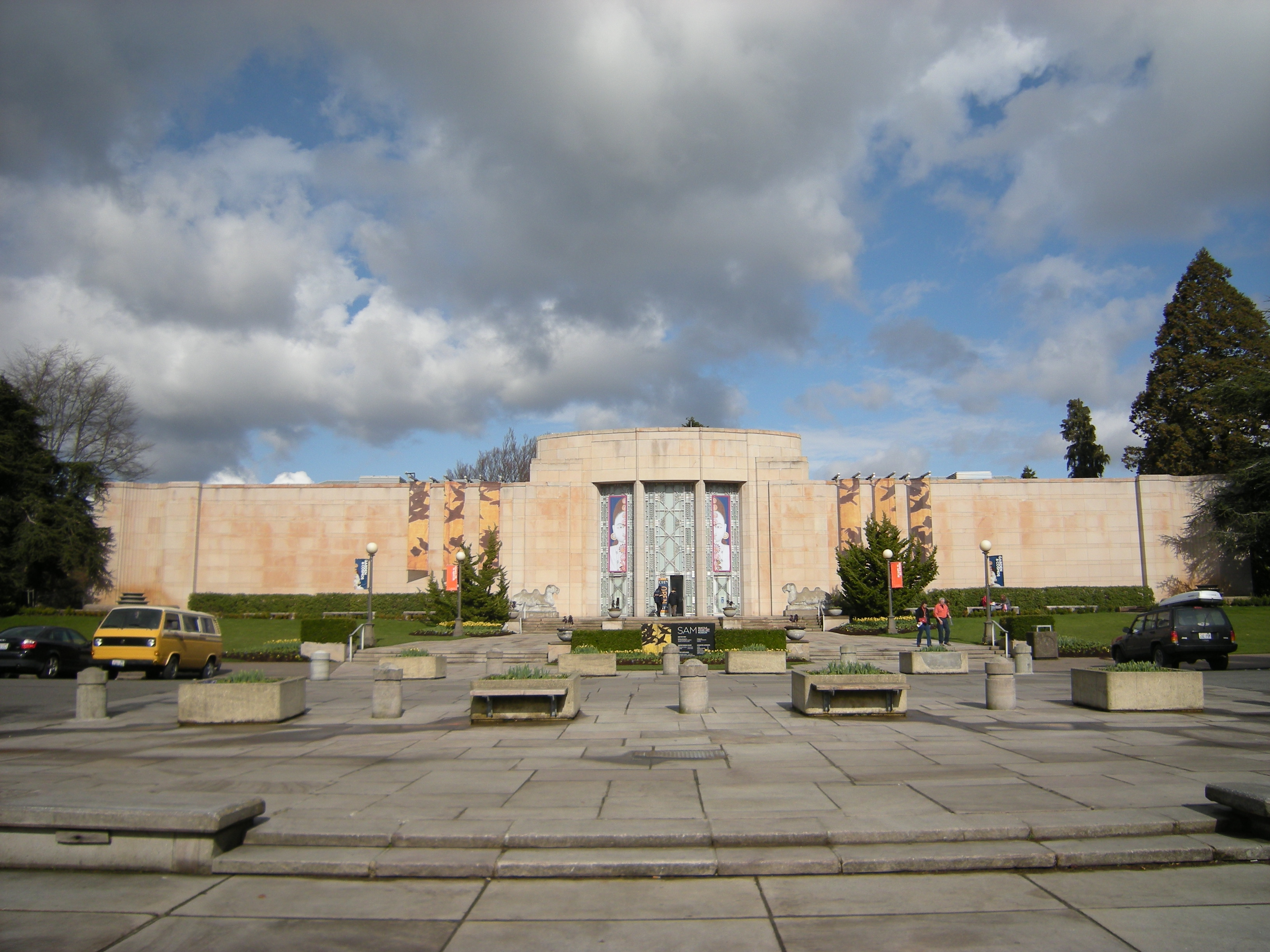
The 1933 Seattle Art Museum in Volunteer Park, now Seattle Asian Art Museum. The Art Moderne building was designed by Carl F. Gould.

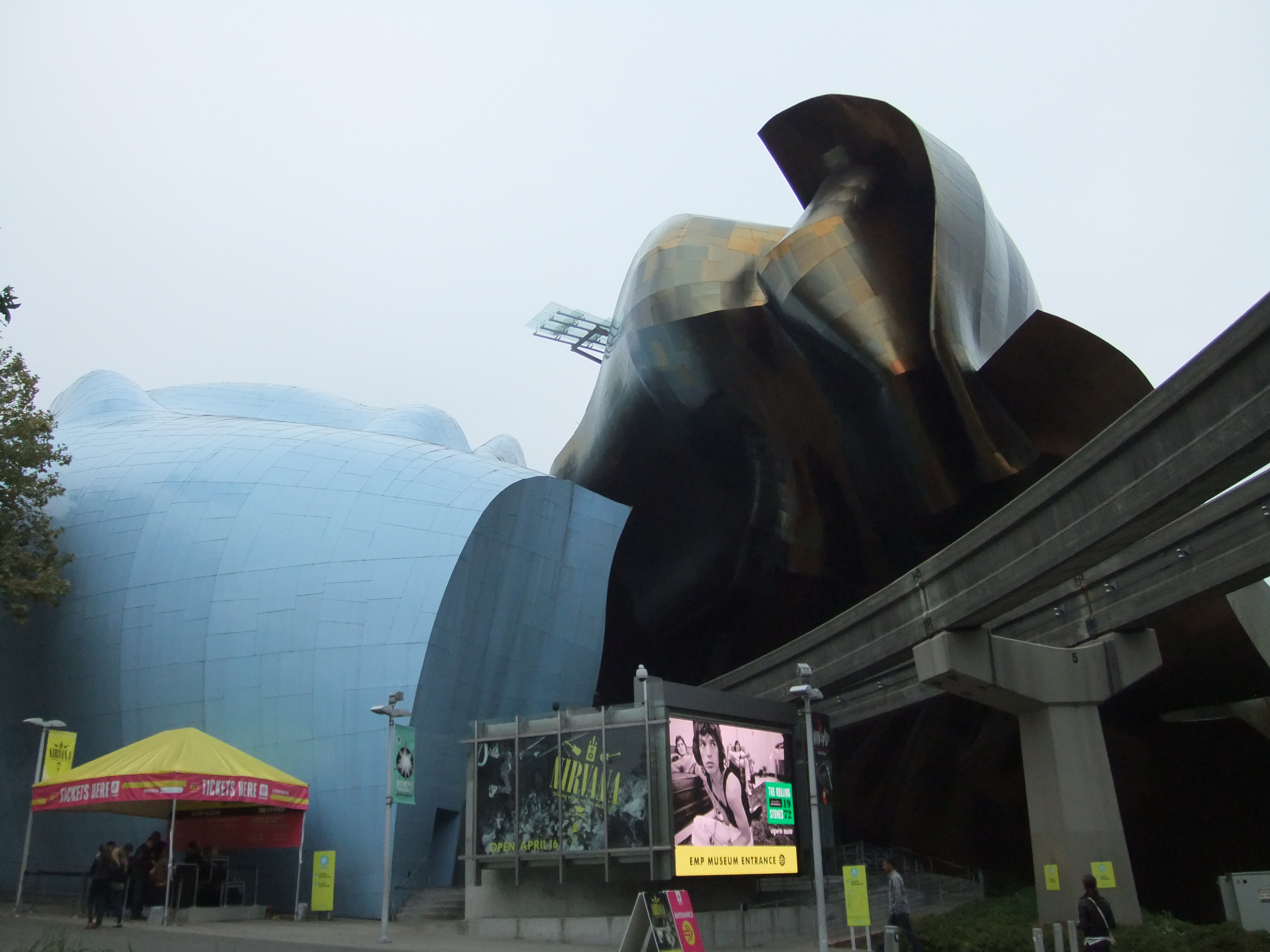
Detail, Museum of Pop Culture with monorail entering

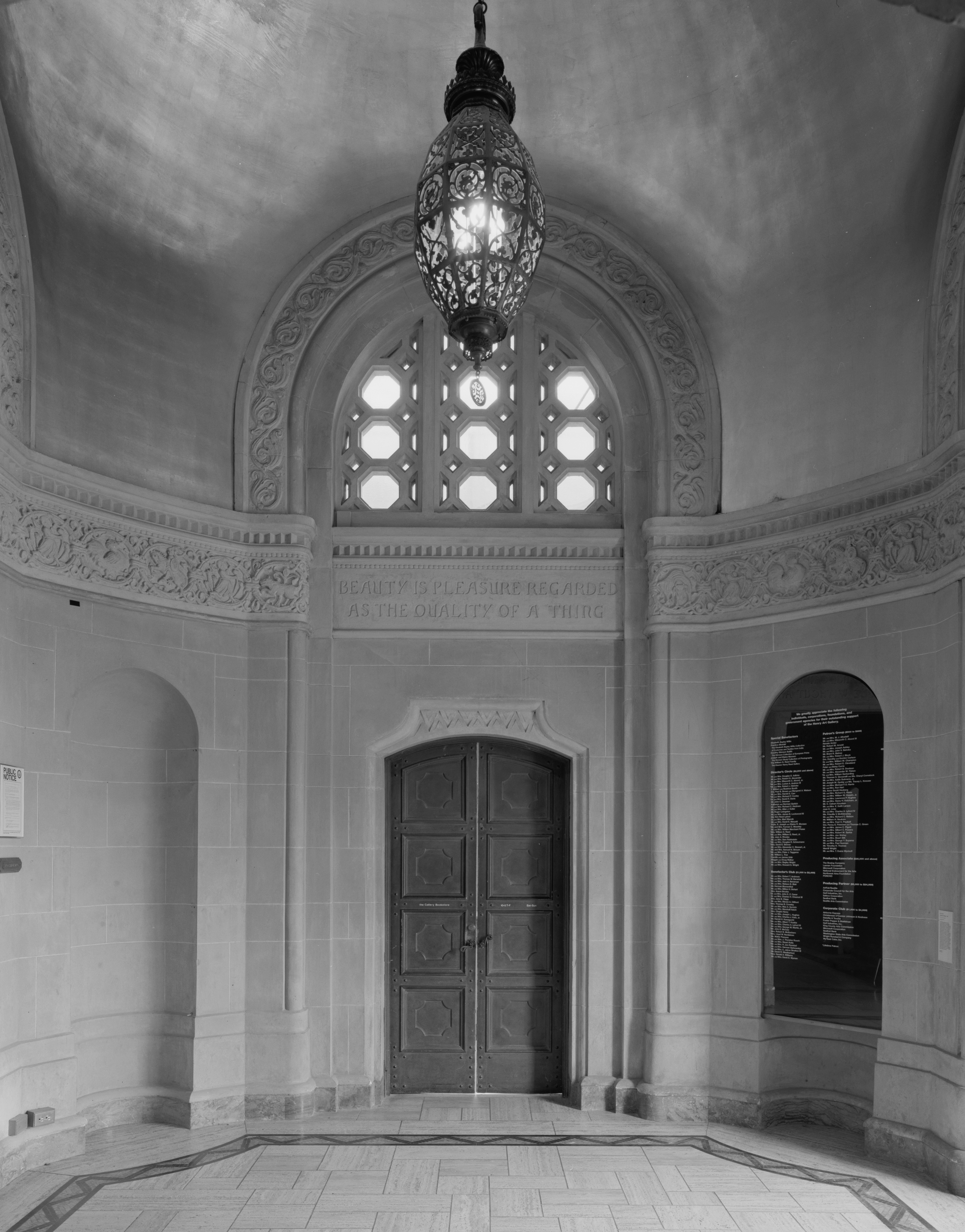
An interior space in the Henry Art Gallery

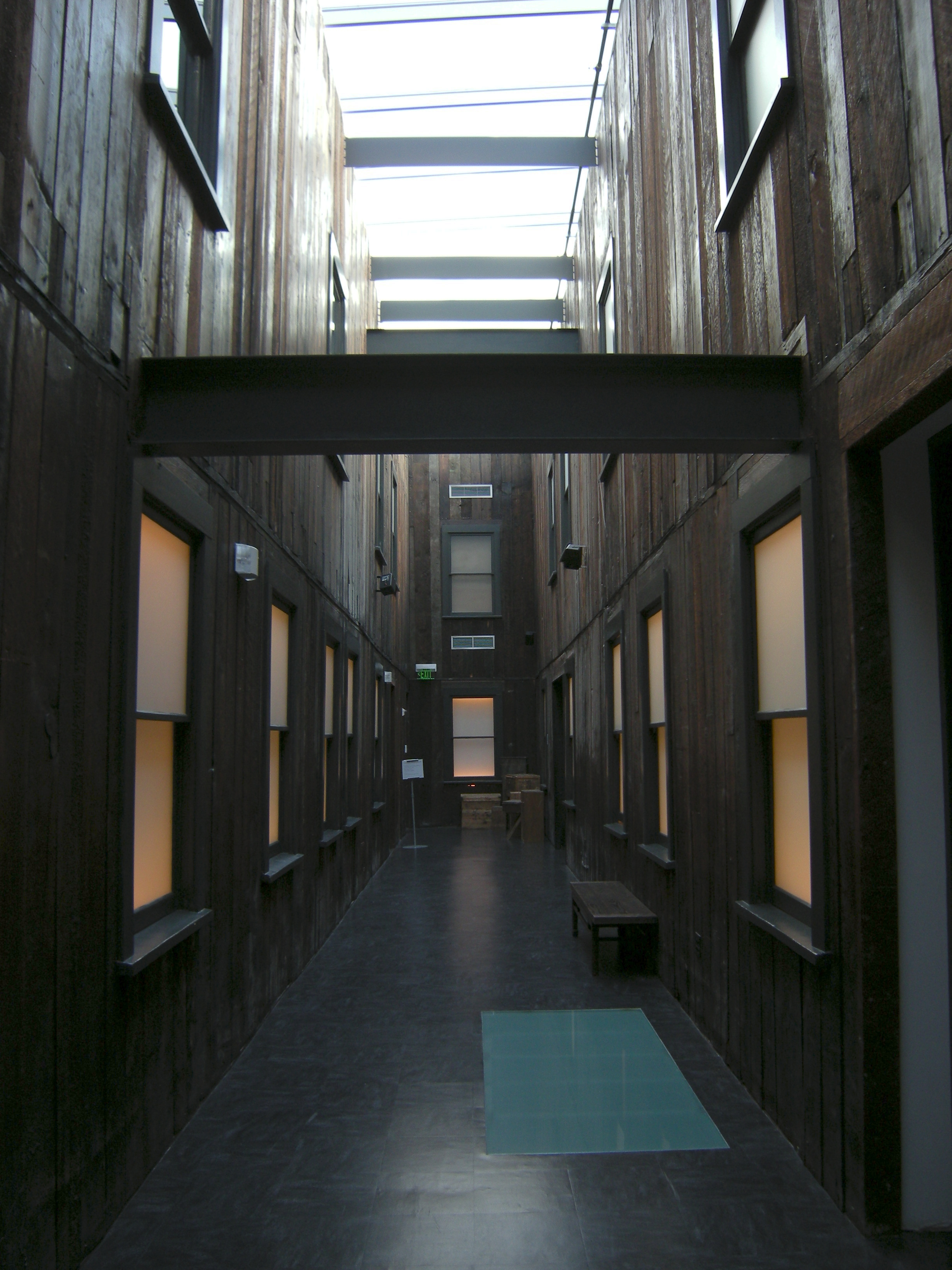
A now-interior space of the Wing Luke Museum, incorporating a light well from the East Kong Yick Building.

Seattle's museums also present a mix of purpose-built and repurposed buildings. For the Georgetown PowerPlant Museum and the Log House Museum in West Seattle, the building itself is the museum's own main exhibit, and the Wing Luke Museum of the Asian Pacific American Experience makes similar use of portions of its home, the renovated 1910 East Kong Yick Building. The Museum of History and Industry is in a converted Naval Reserve armory; their earlier (1952) purpose-built museum in Montlake, designed by Paul Thiry was closed in 2012 and demolished to make room for an expansion of Washington State Route 520. The Museum of Pop Culture (MoPOP, originally Experience Music Project) is in a Frank Gehry-designed building at Seattle Center. Seattle Art Museum's (SAM's) downtown facility began with a building designed by Robert Venturi (completed 1991) and was expanded in 2007 into an adjacent museum-and-office building designed by Portland, Oregon architect Brad Cloepfil. The offices were originally built for now-defunct bank Washington Mutual; as the Russell Investments center it is now the headquarters of Russell Investments; Dendreon and others also have offices there. When SAM moved downtown, they left behind their Art Moderne building in Volunteer Park (Carl F. Gould, 1933) to be used for the Seattle Asian Art Museum. The Henry Art Gallery extended its Bebb and Gould building (1927) on the University of Washington campus with a modernist auditorium and galleries (1997) by Gwathmey Siegel & Associates Architects, which dwarfs the original building, increasing exhibition space from 5,000 square feet (460 m^{2}) to 14,000 square feet (1,300 m^{2}). The Frye Art Museum expanded their facility on First Hill in 1997, retaining the Modernist style of Paul Thiry's 1952 building.

== Schools and other educational buildings ==
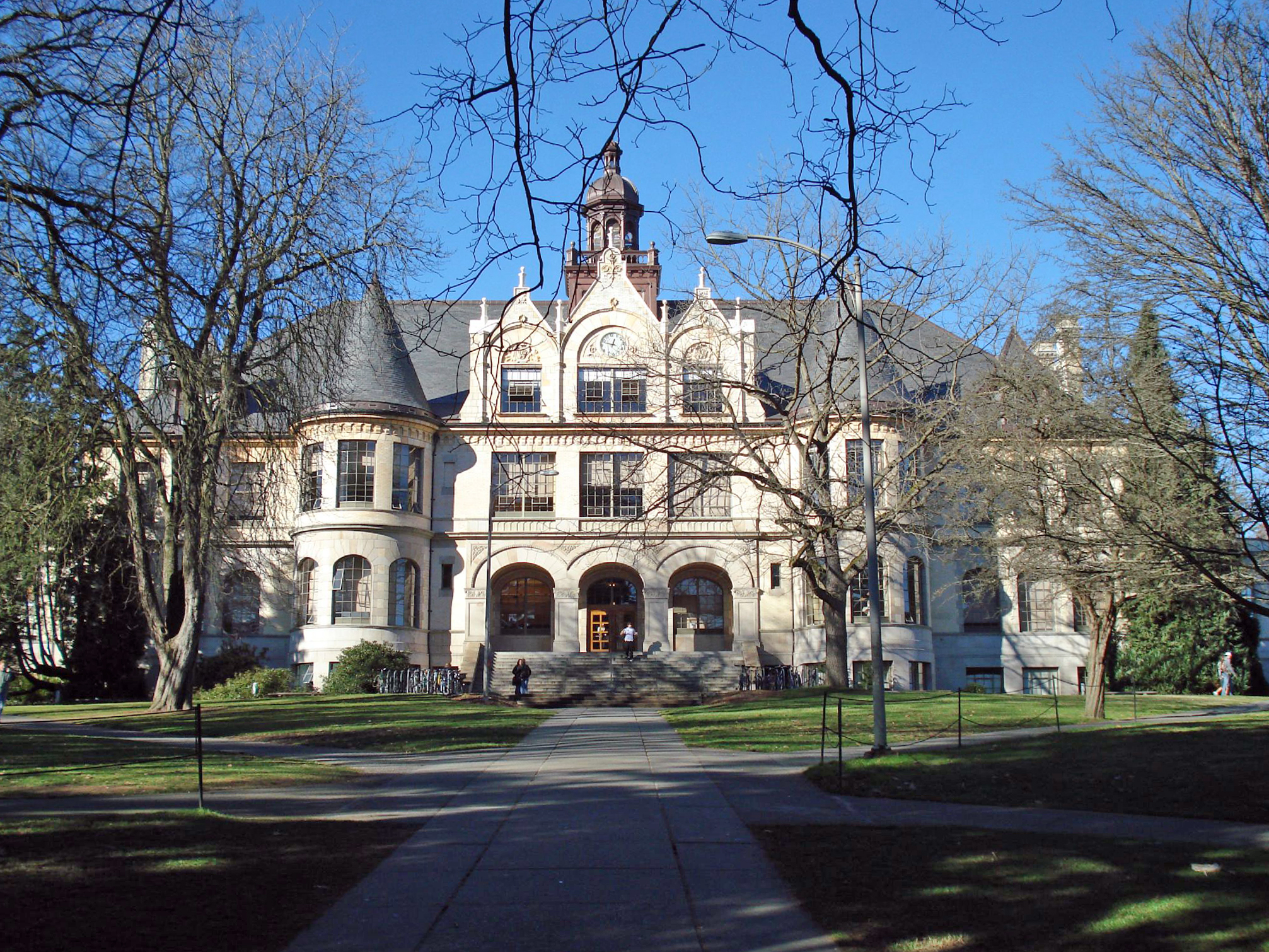
Denny Hall, built 1894–1895, the oldest building on the University of Washington campus

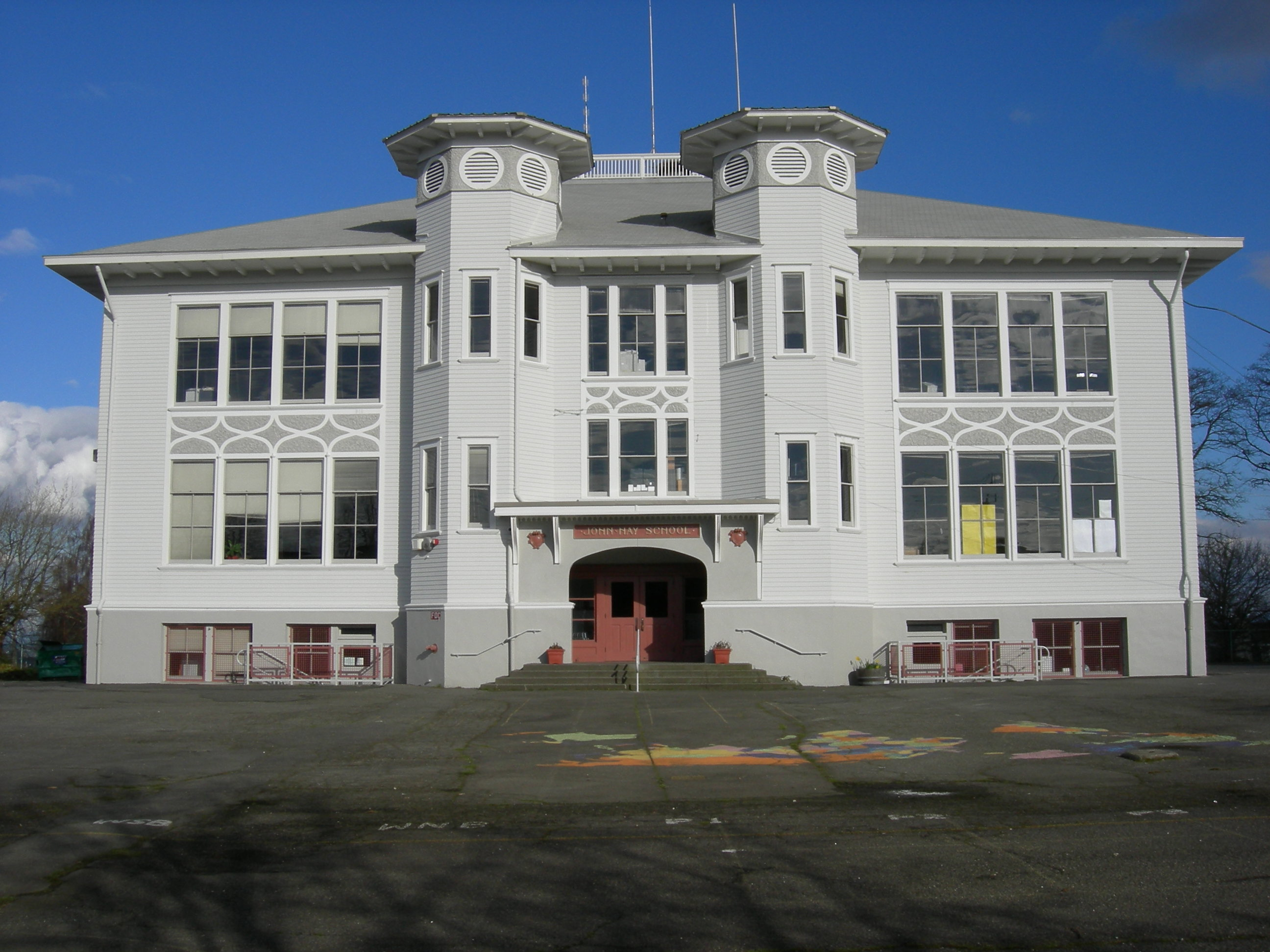
The old, wooden John Hay School (elementary) on Queen Anne Hill, designed by James Stephen, built 1905

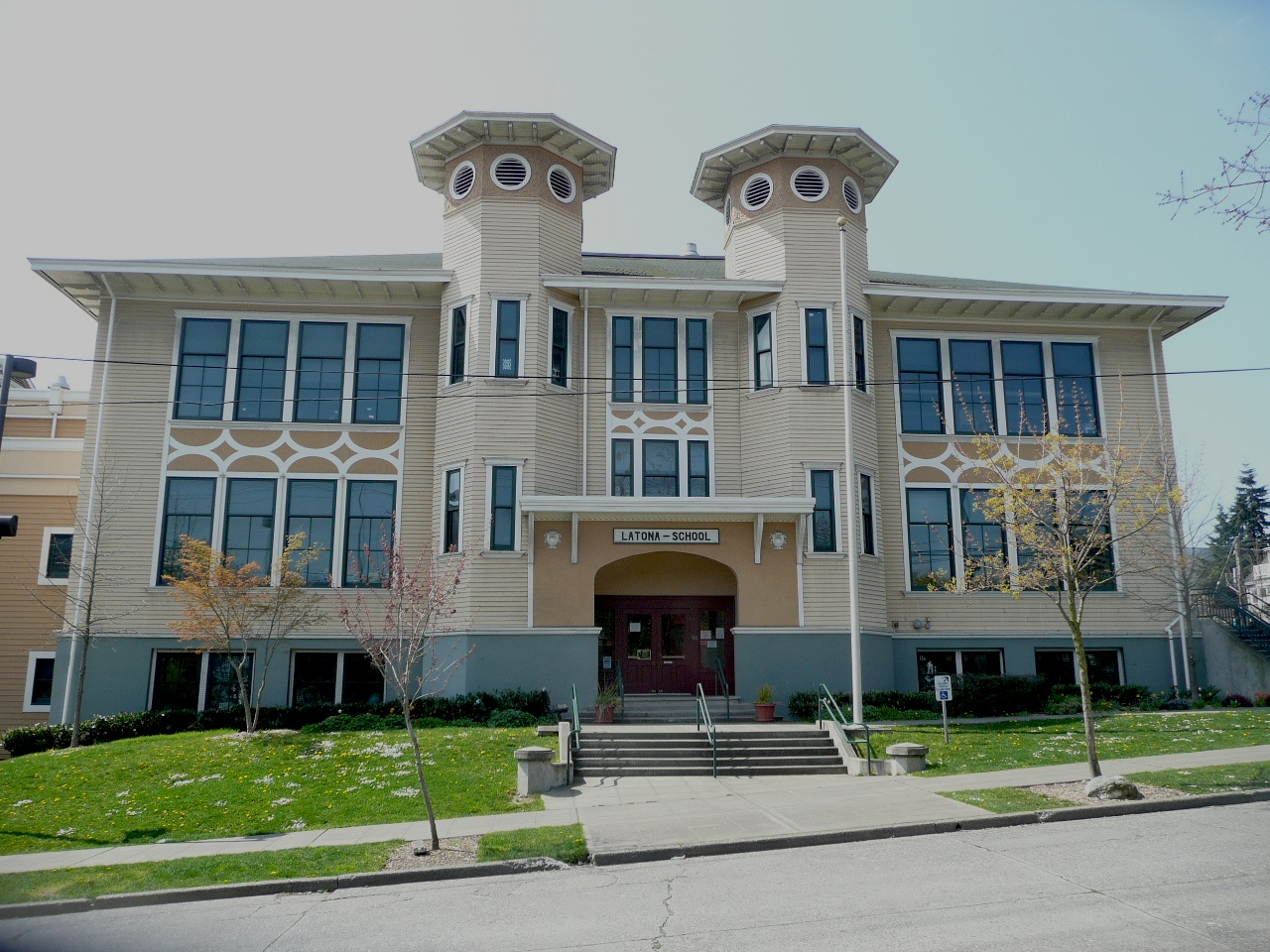
An extremely similar design was used for a number of schools, the last of which was the Latona School (built 1906), now John Stanford International School, a bilingual orientation center.

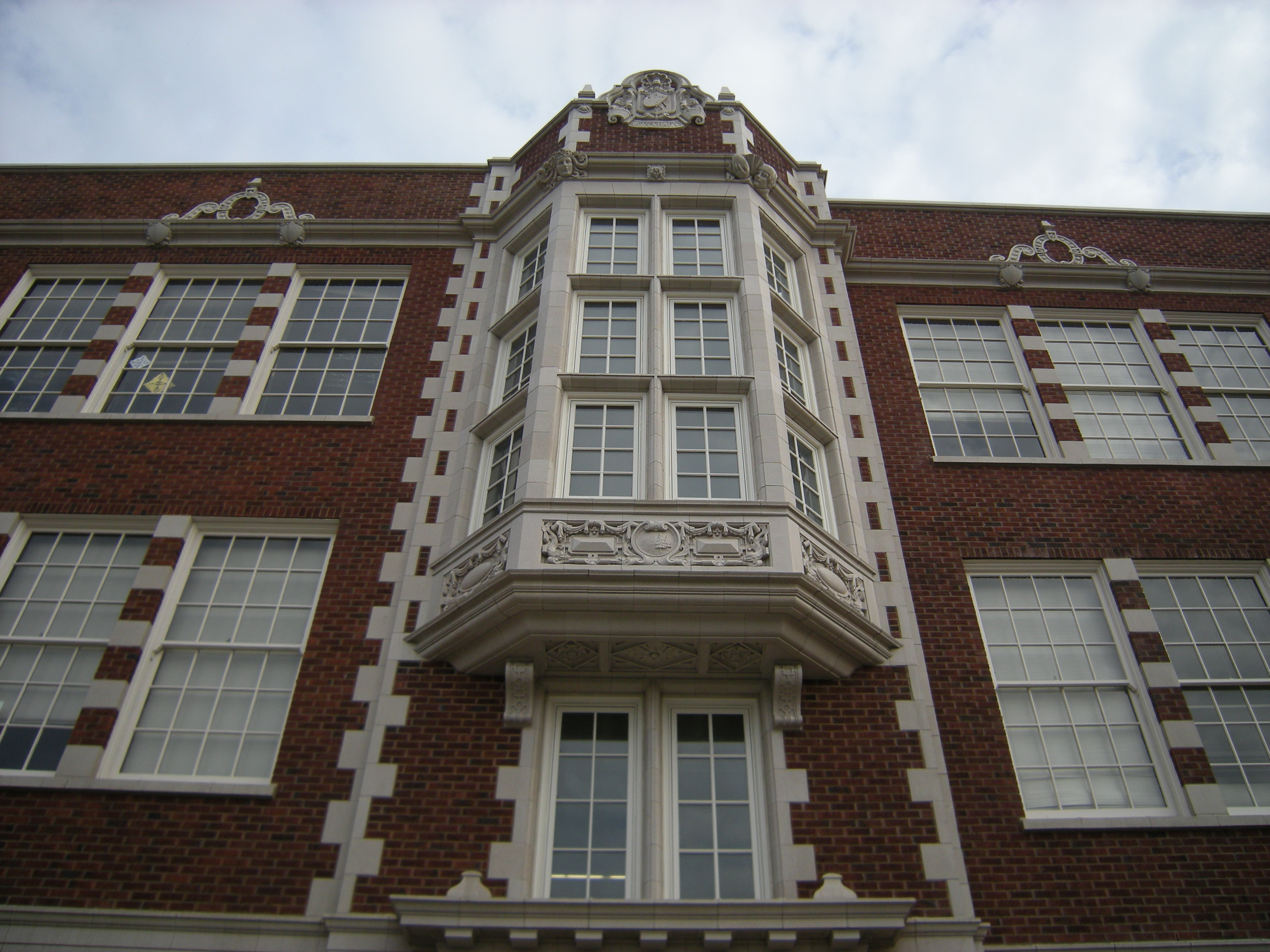
Oriel window, Garfield High School, built 1923, one of many Seattle public schools designed by Floyd Naramore, later a founder of NBBJ

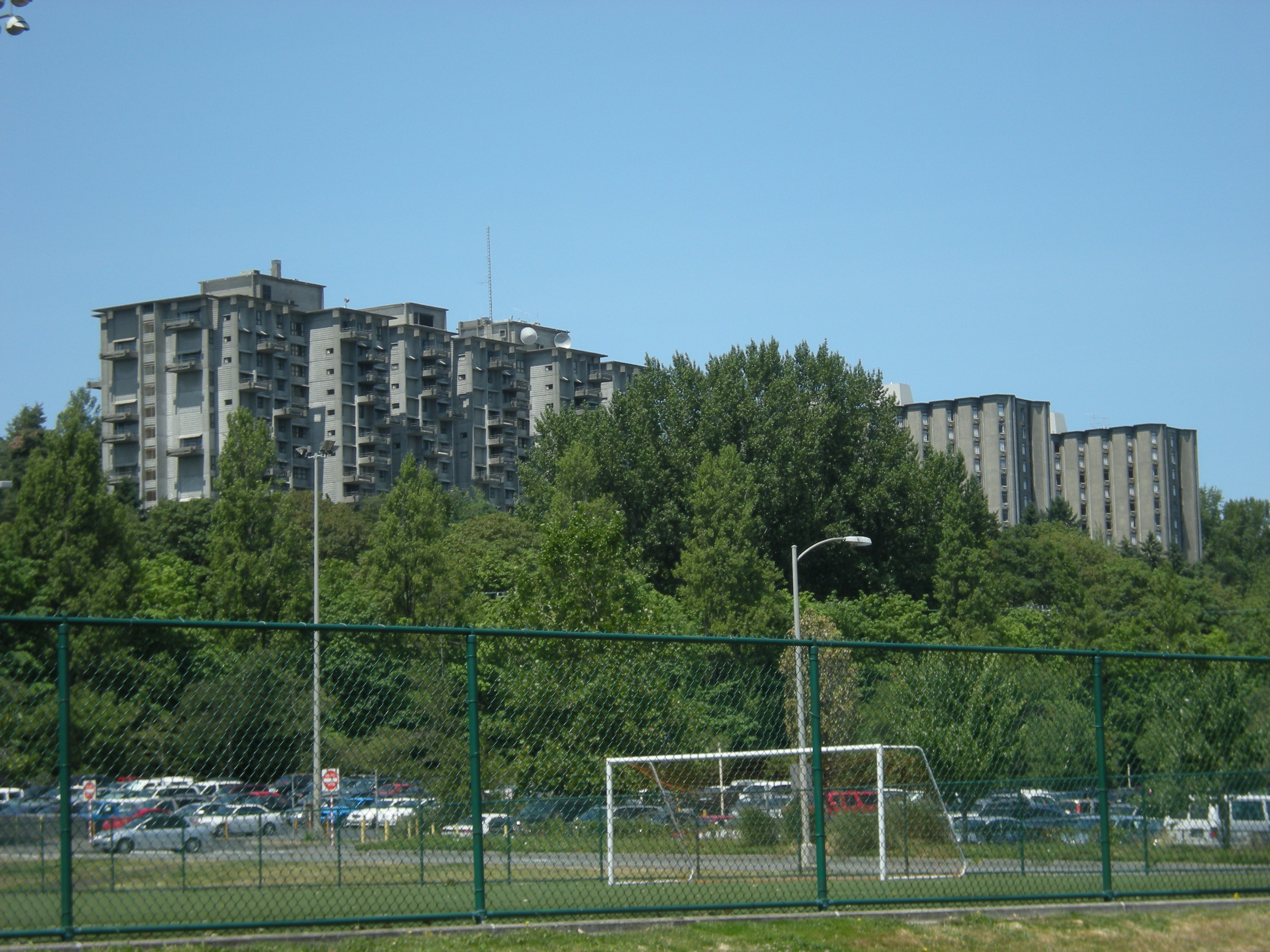
The brutalist architecture of McMahon Hall (left, 1965) and Haggett Hall (right, 1963, designed by Paul Hayden Kirk), University of Washington dormitories

== Police, fire and other government buildings ==
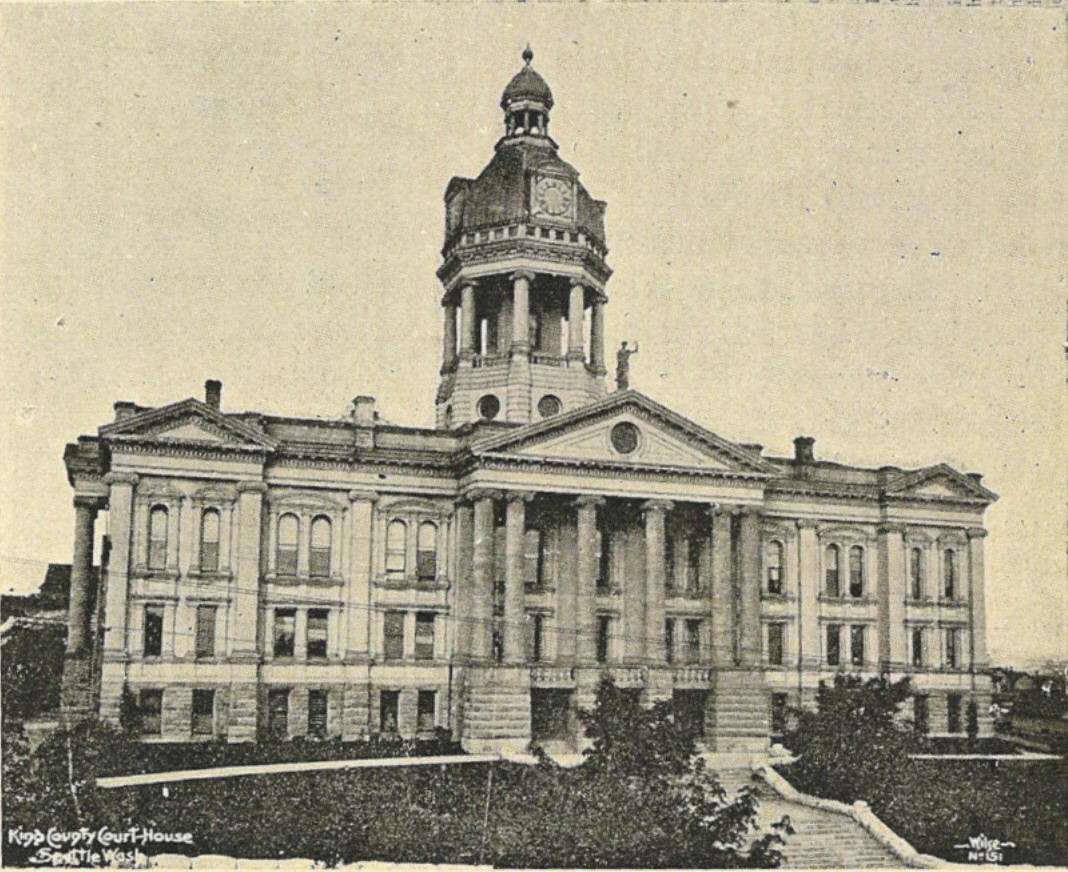
The old King County Courthouse, built 1890 atop "Profanity Hill"; ceased to be a courthouse 1917, torn down in the 1930s

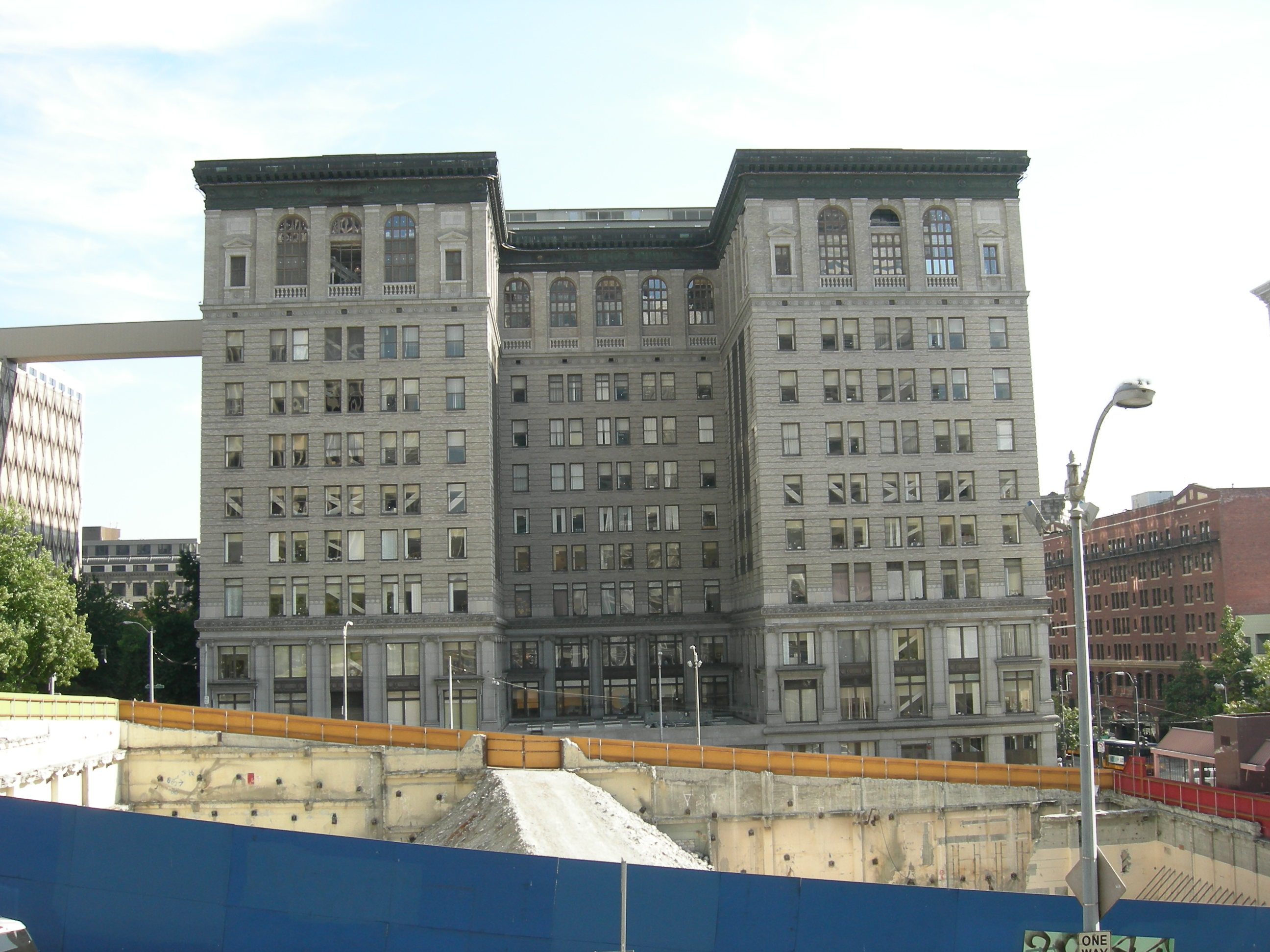
The present-day King County Courthouse, originally (1931) City-County Building

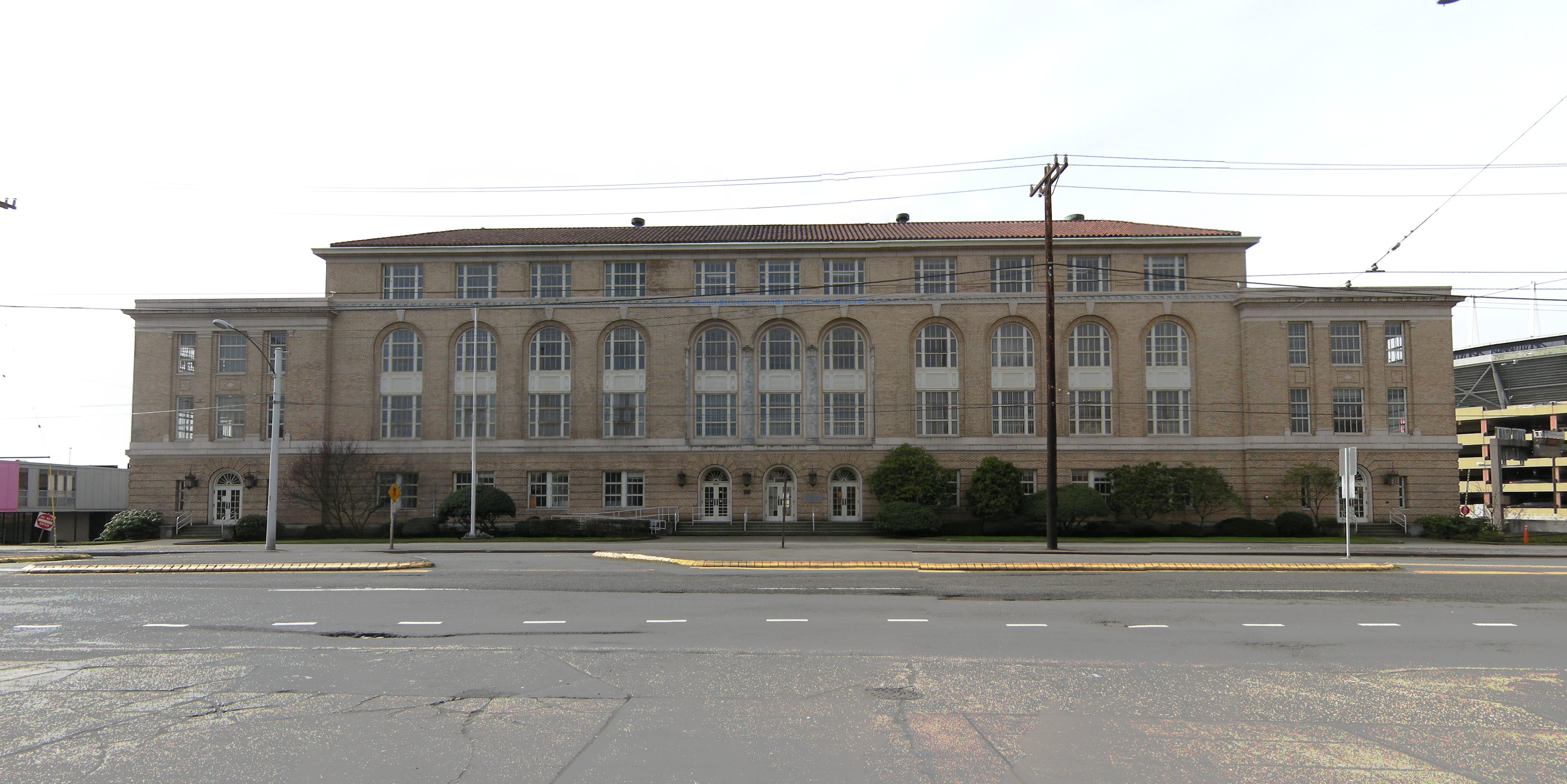
Former U.S. Immigrant Station and Assay Office, built 1932

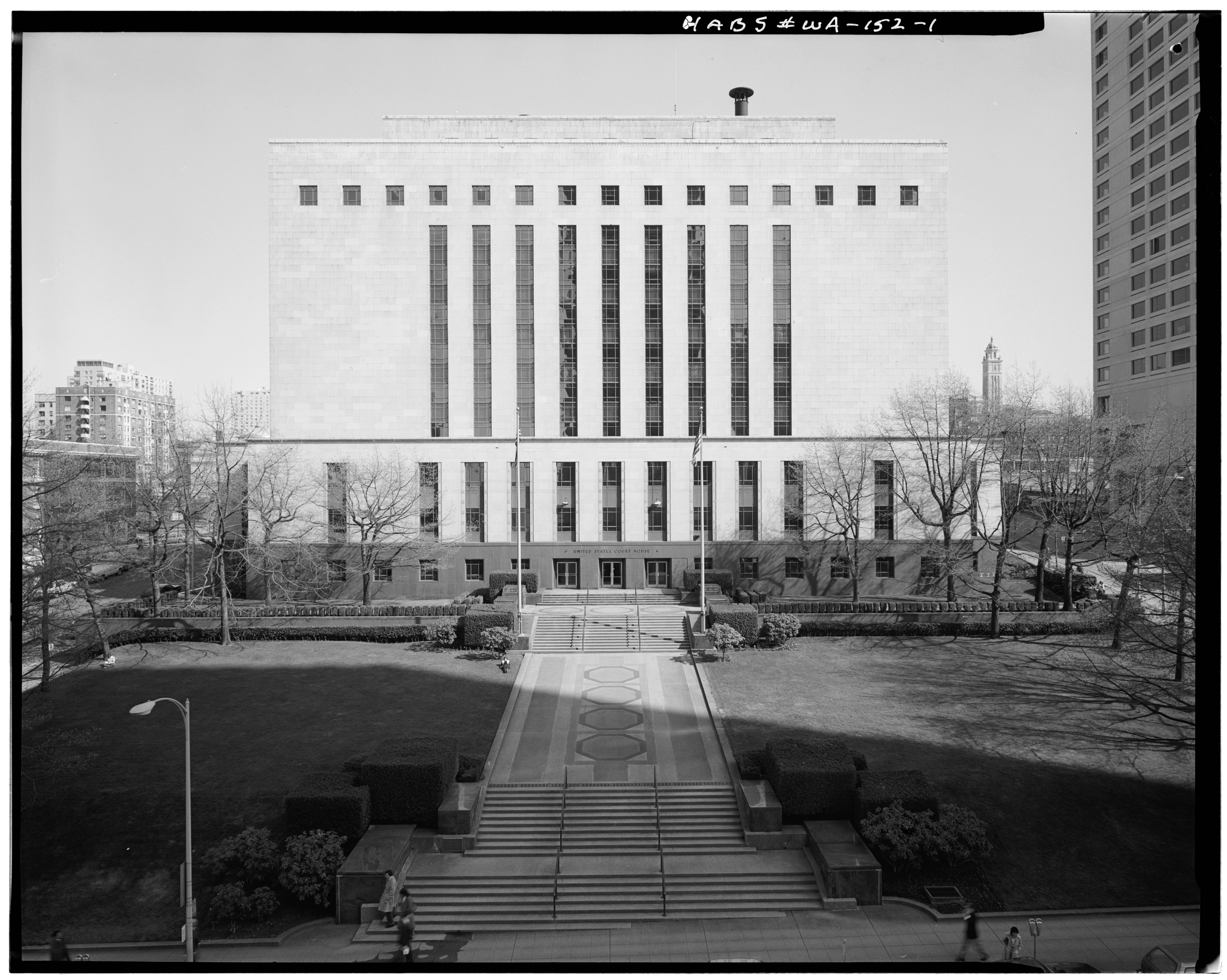
William Kenzo Nakamura Federal Courthouse, built 1940

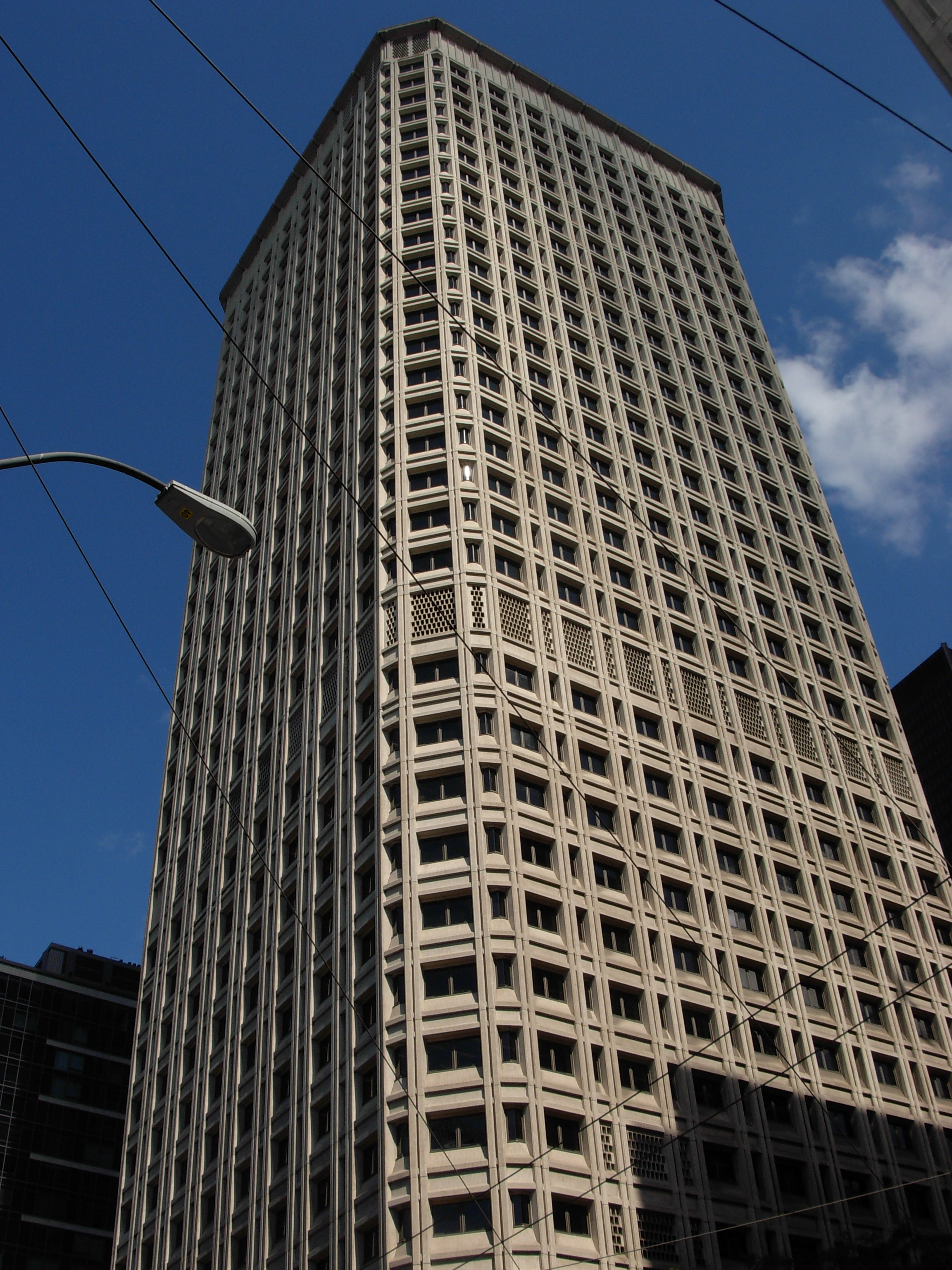
Henry M. Jackson Federal Building, built 1974

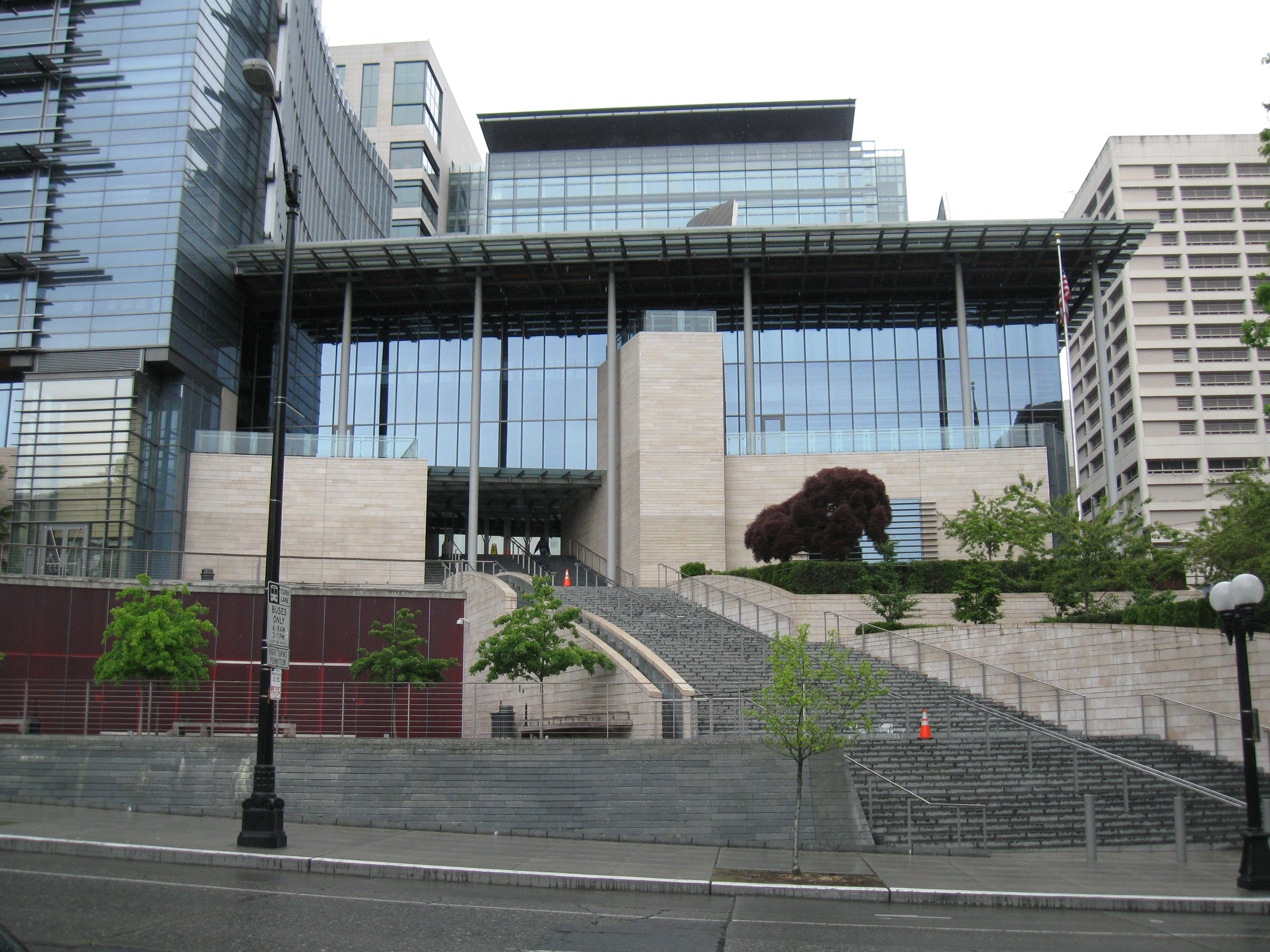
Seattle City Hall, built 2005

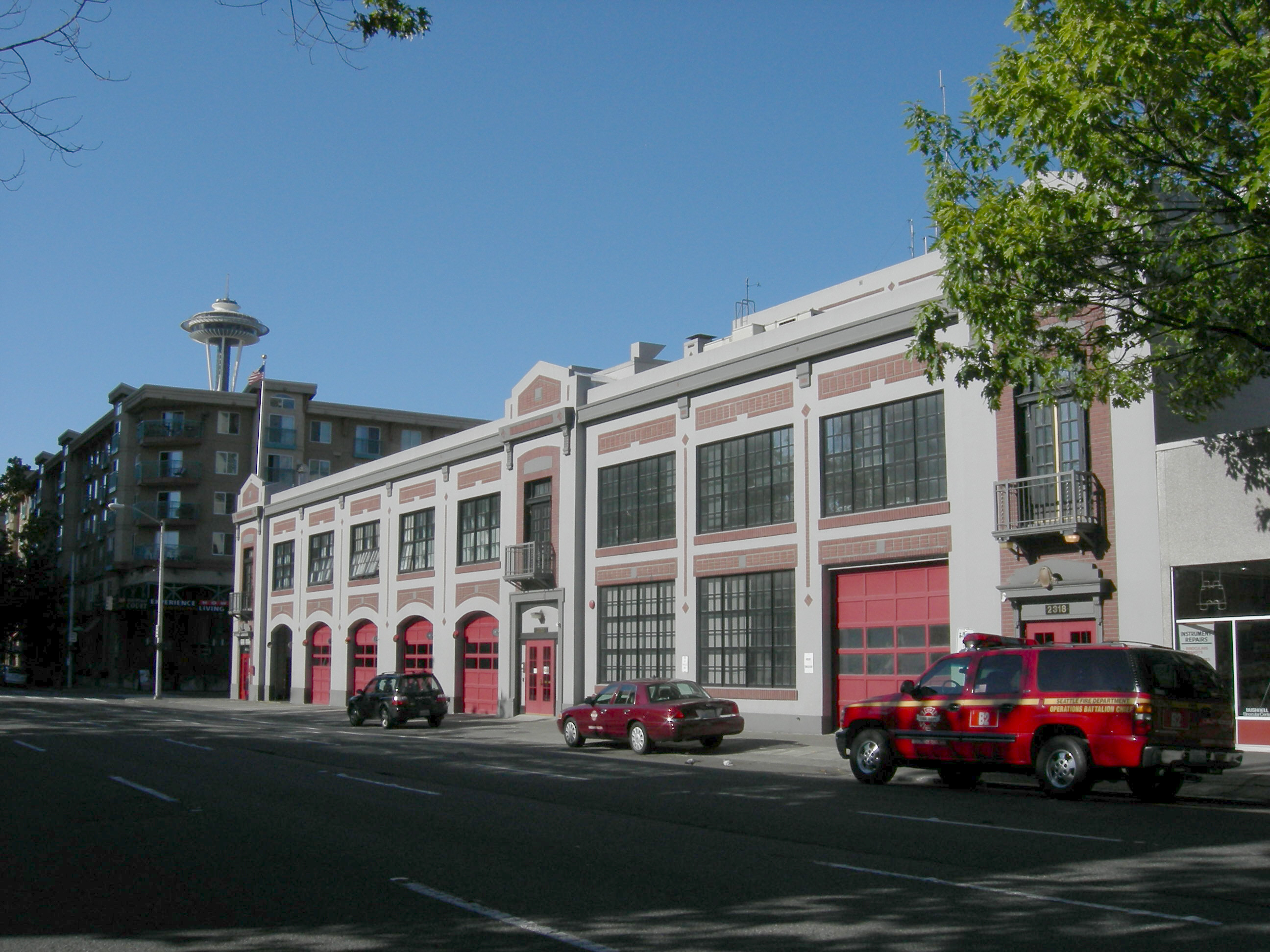
Fire Station No. 2 in Belltown

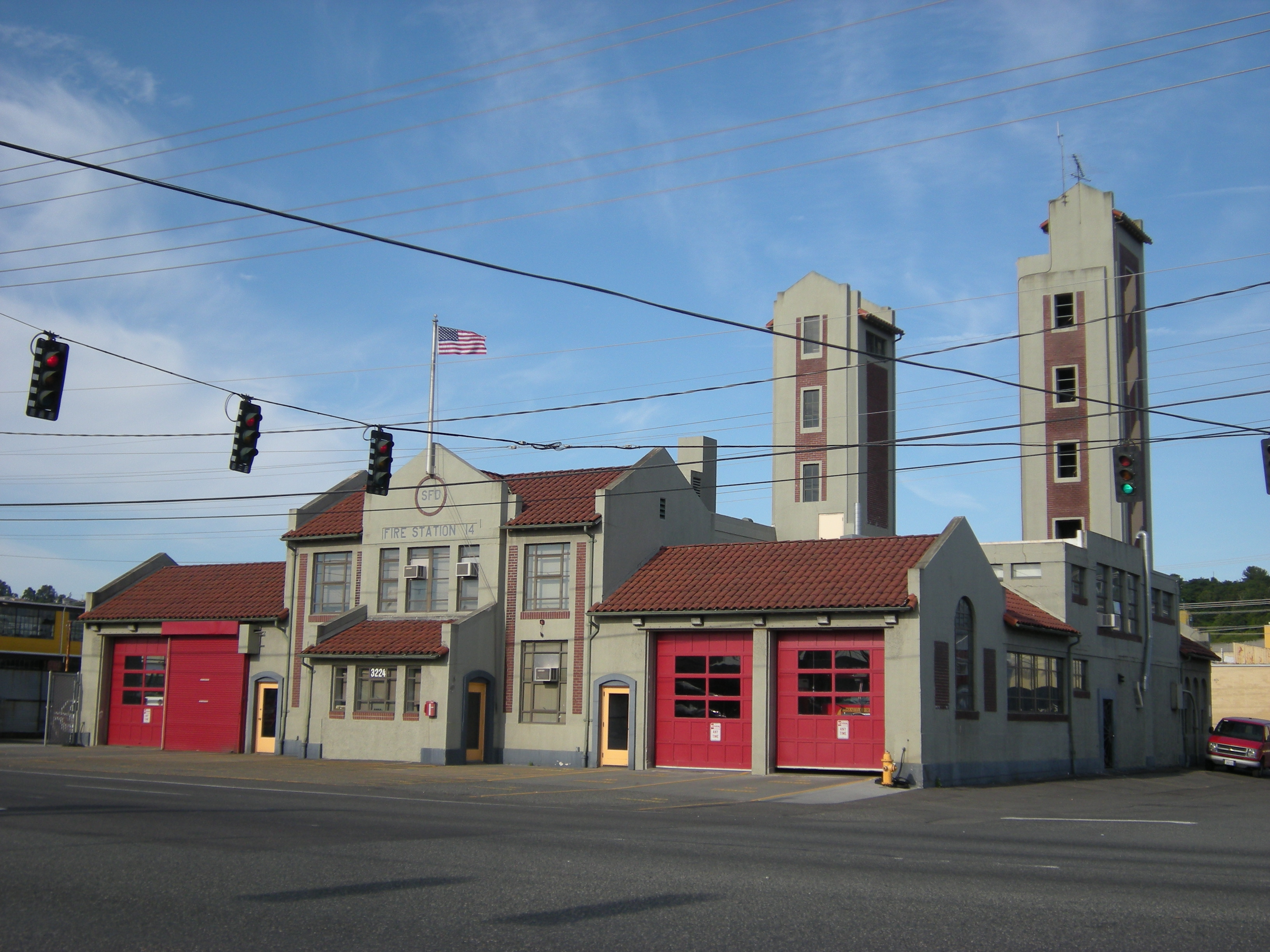
Fire Station No. 14 in Sodo

== Sports and entertainment venues ==
- Yesler Hall (first de facto entertainment venue and meeting place), Yesler Pavilion (first deliberately created entertainment venue & meeting place)
- Coliseum Theatre: Marcus Priteca, Alexander Pantages, arguably America's first "movie palace"
- Other notable theaters past and present: Moore, Orpheum, Music Hall, Fifth Avenue
- Fraternal lodges and reuse of some of their spaces (Eagles Auditorium, Masonic Lodge that became the Egyptian, Oddfellows Hall & Century Ballroom)
- Neighborhood theaters and in some cases their repurposing (e.g. the Russian Hall on 19th; rebuild of the Majestic Bay; survival of the Admiral)
- Seattle Ice Arena: former ice hockey arena on University Street in Downtown Seattle
- Sick's Stadium – defunct; venue for the Seattle Pilots in their only season before moving to Milwaukee as the Brewers
- T-Mobile Park
- CenturyLink Field
- Proposed NBA/NHL arena in SODO, along with KeyArena renovation proposal
- Climate Pledge Arena
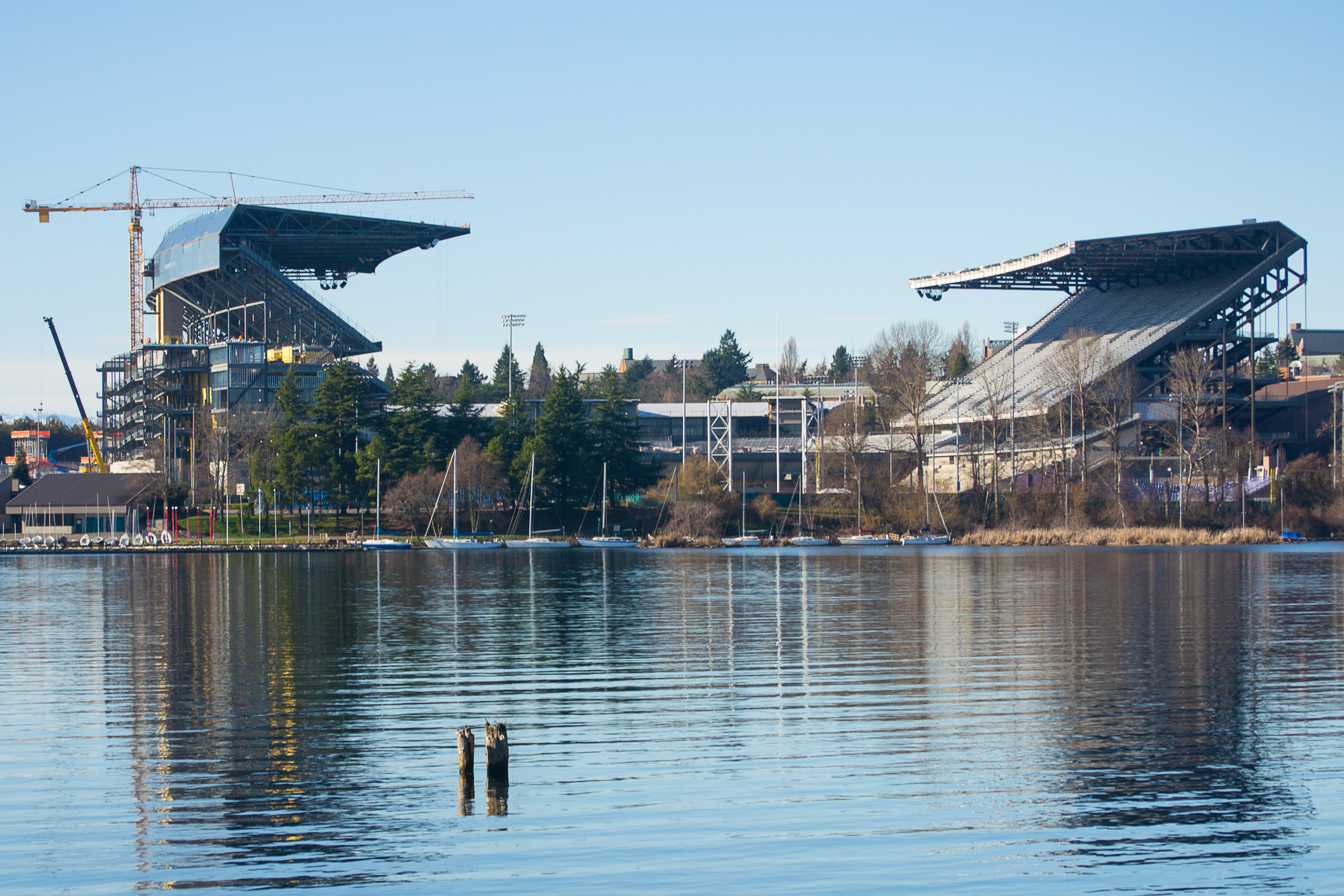
Husky Stadium, University of Washington, seen across Union Bay. The original stands were built 1920 by the Puget Sound Bridge and Dredging Company; major modifications included the cantilevered covered south stands (1950), similar stands on the north side (1987), and the major reconstruction 2011–2013, in progress in this photo.

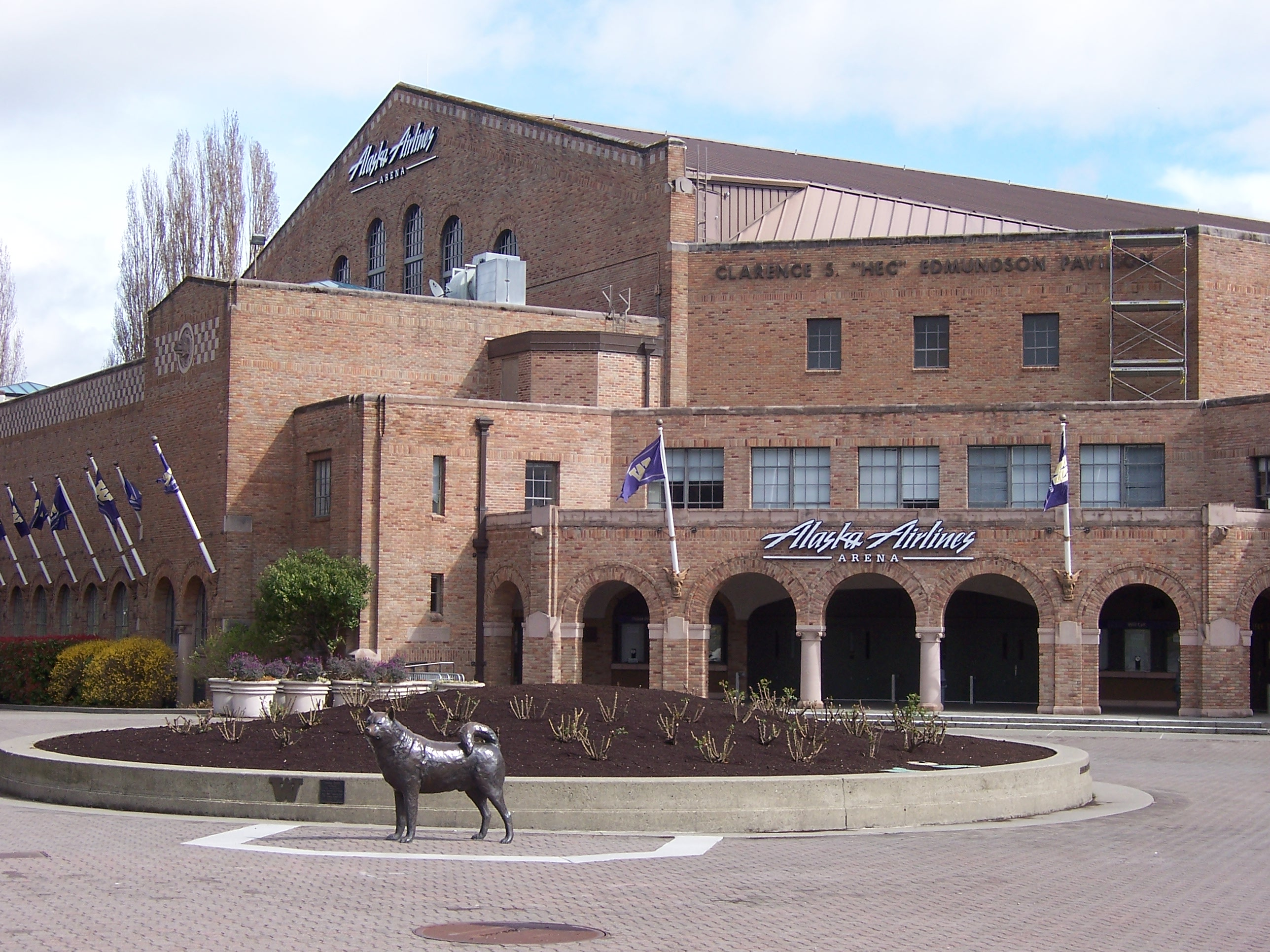
Hec Edmundson Pavilion (built 1927, major renovation 1999), University of Washington

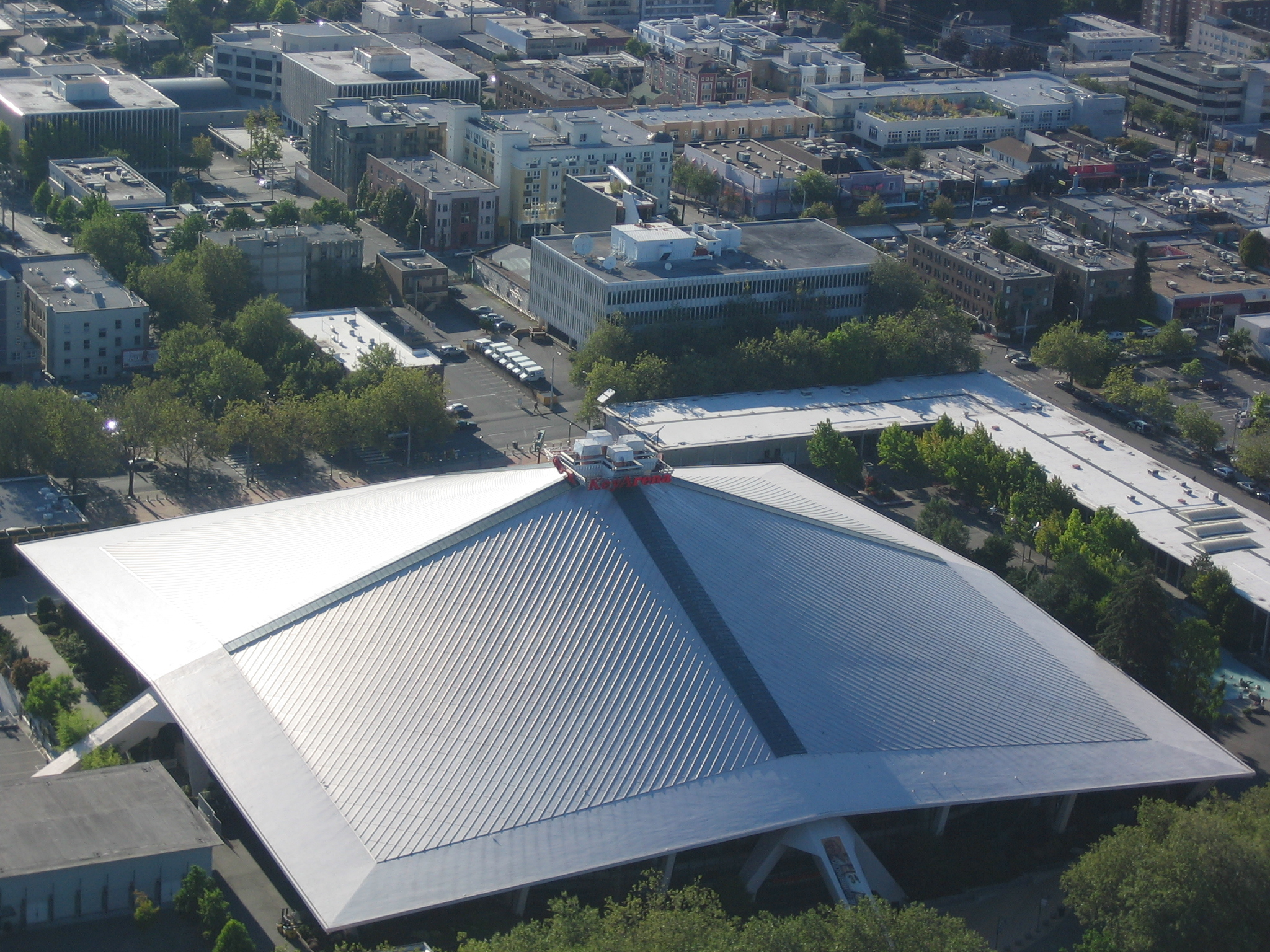
Aerial view of Climate Pledge Arena (previously Coliseum), designed by Paul Thiry and built for the Century 21 Exposition (1962 World's Fair)

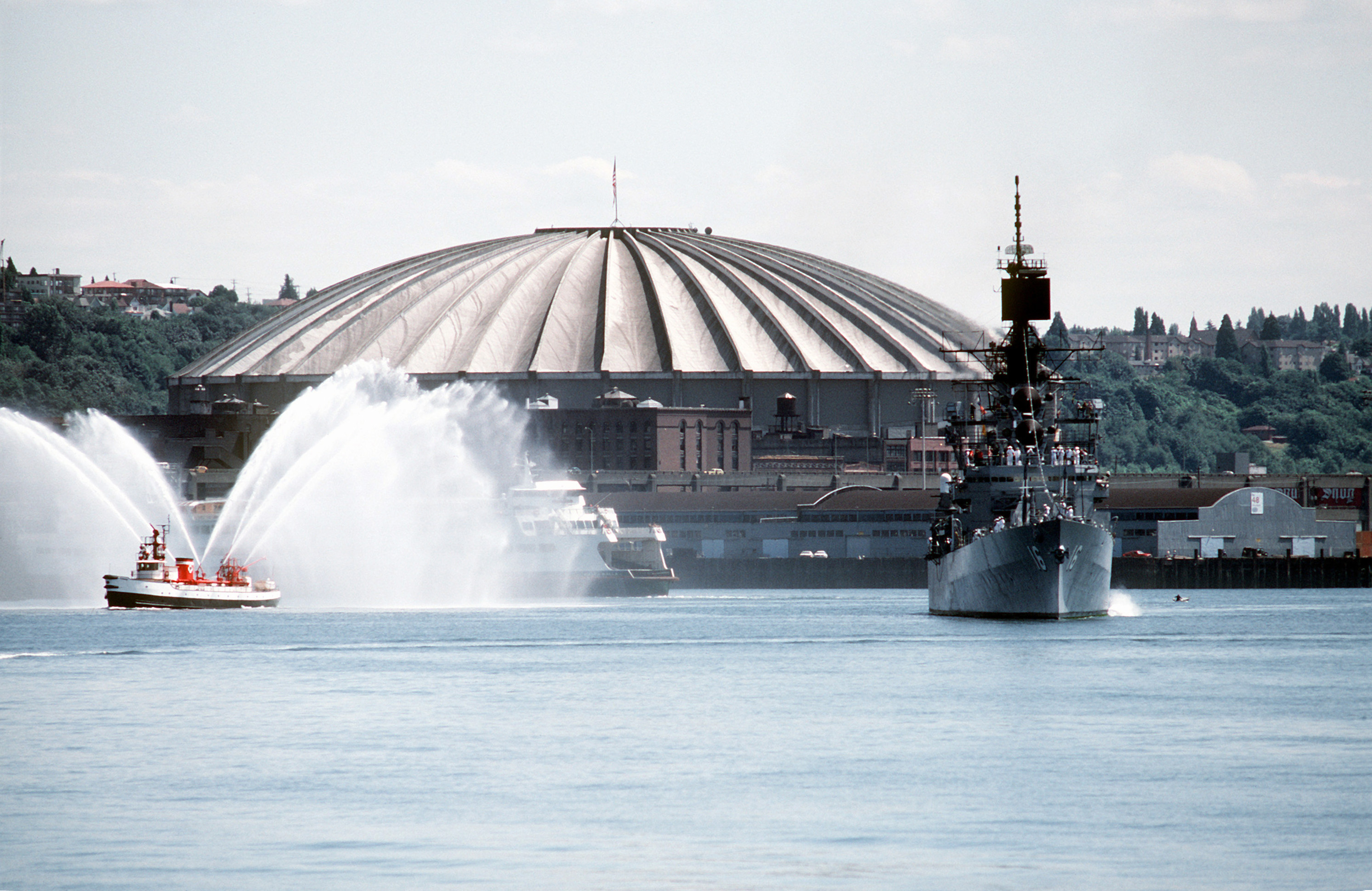
The once-iconic Kingdome, built 1976, demolished 2000

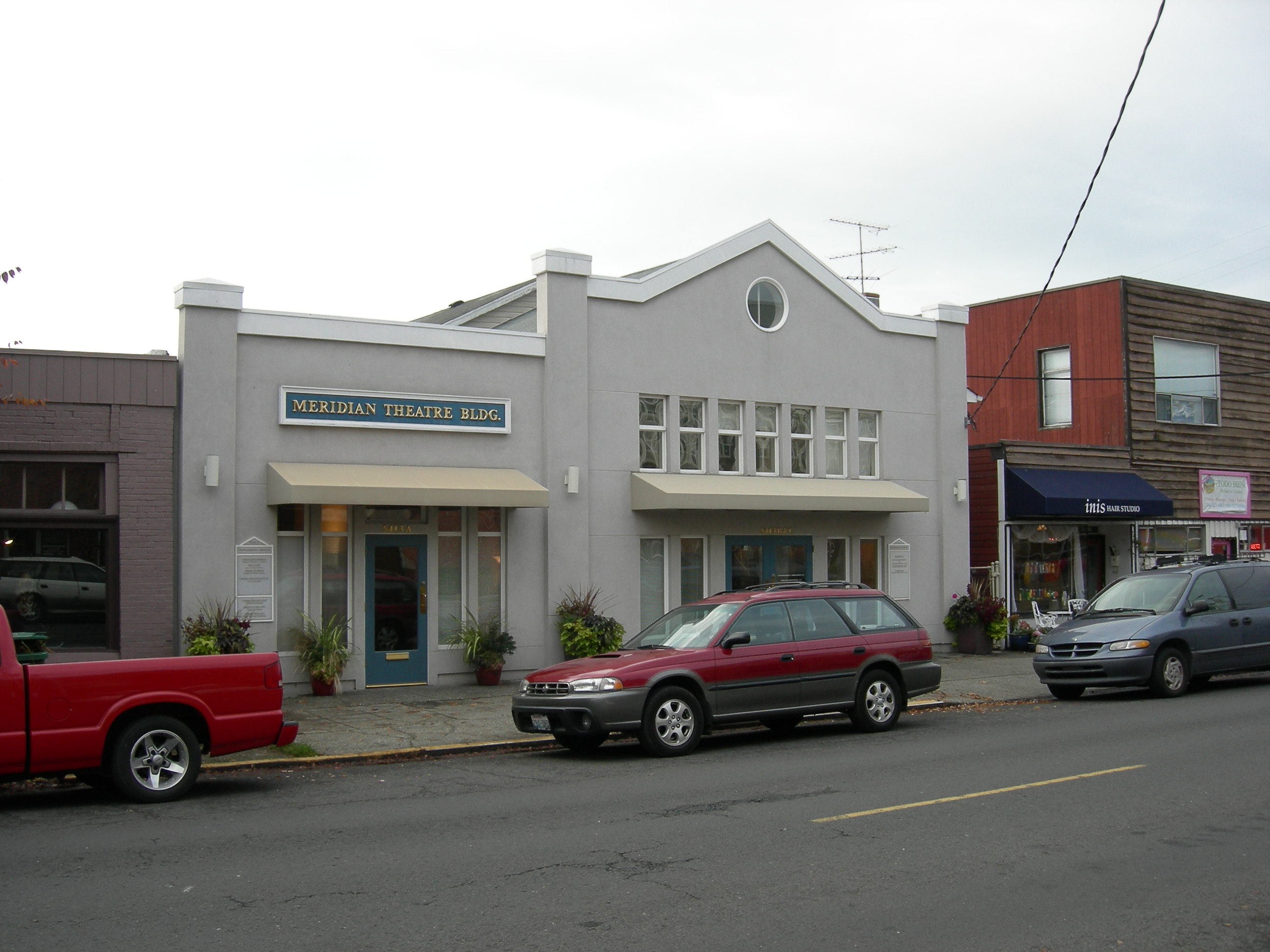
The former Meridian Theatre in the Meridian neighborhood (Wallingford / Green Lake), one of many repurposed former neighborhood cinemas

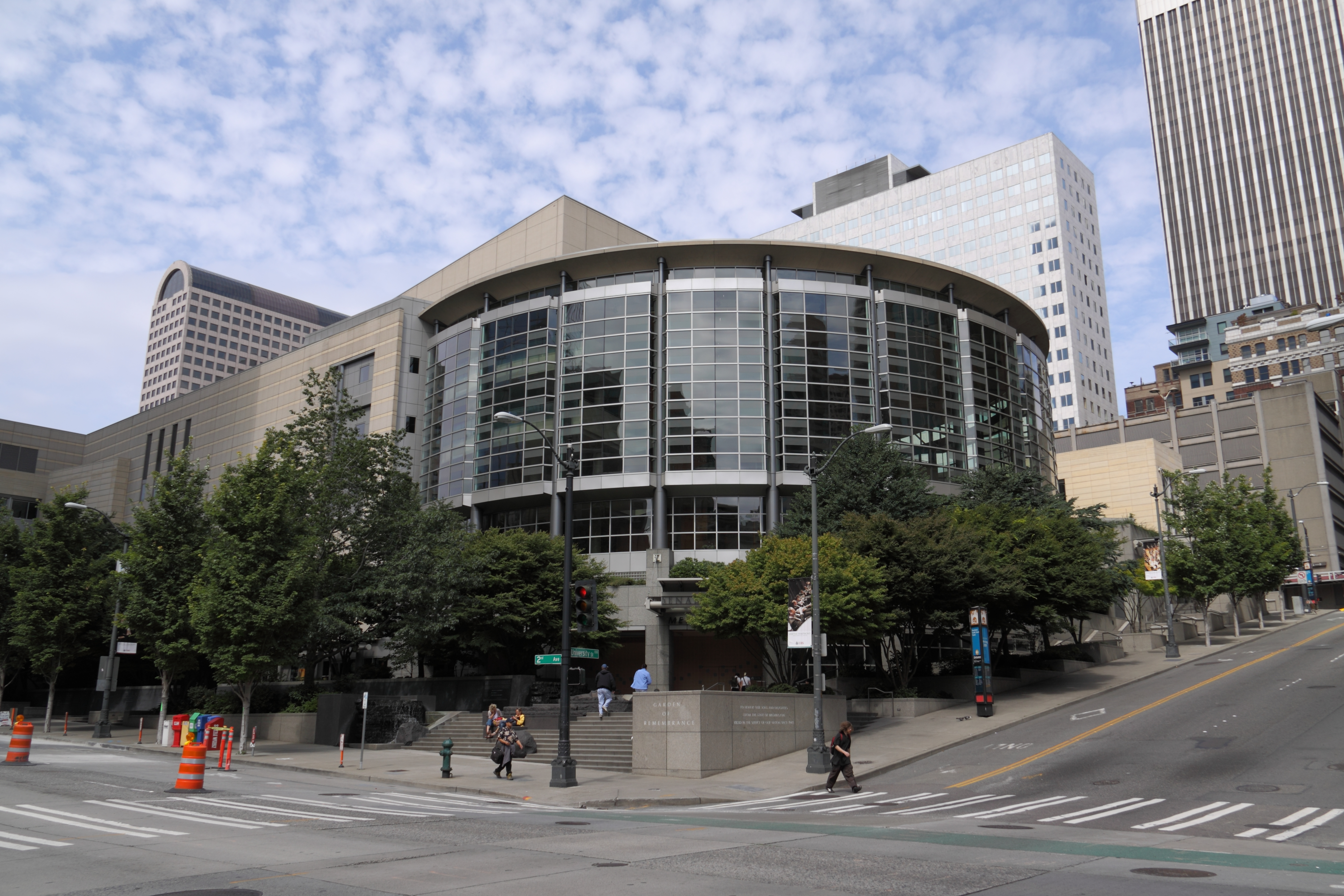
Benaroya Hall, home of the Seattle Symphony

== Transportation architecture ==
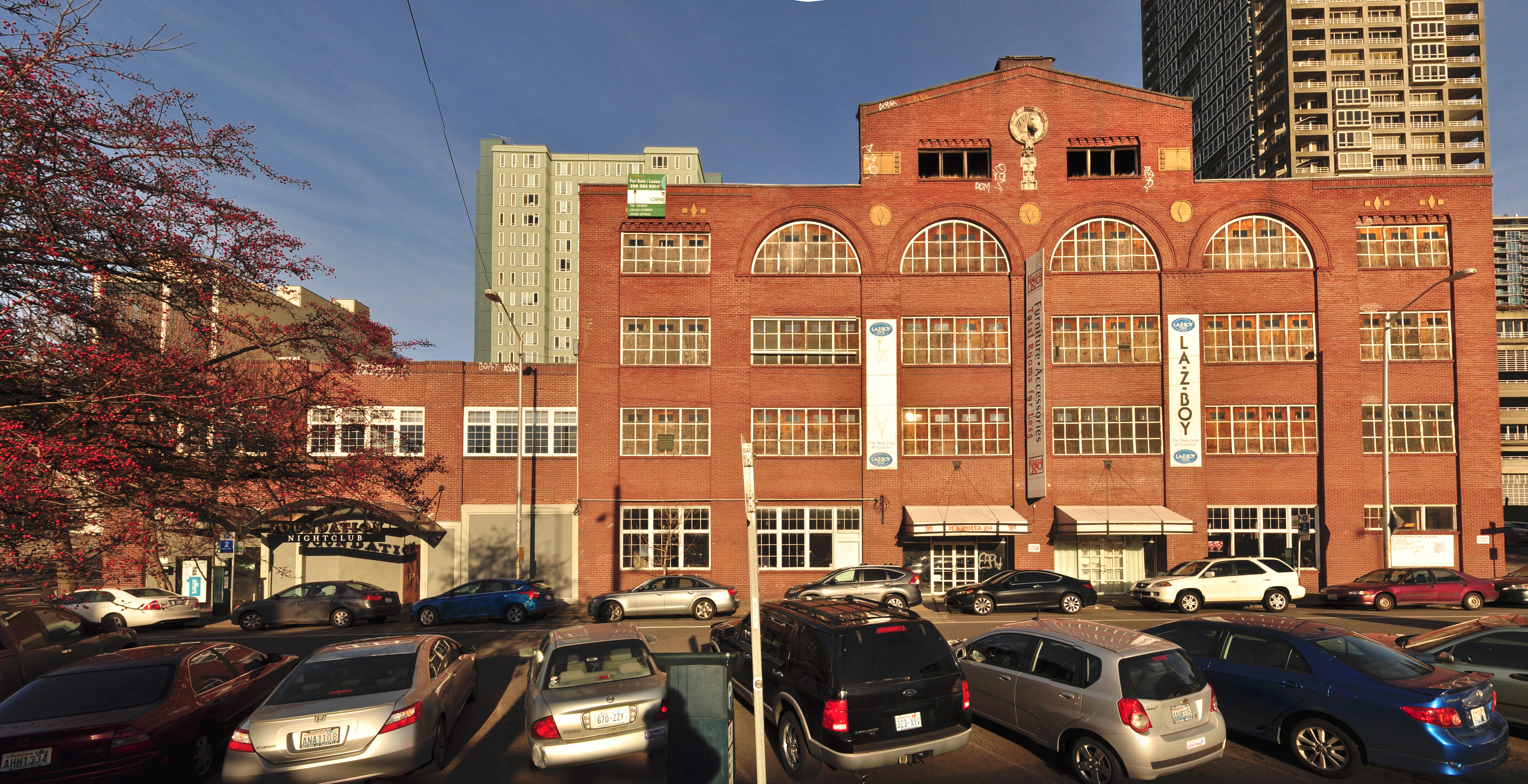
Union Livery Stables

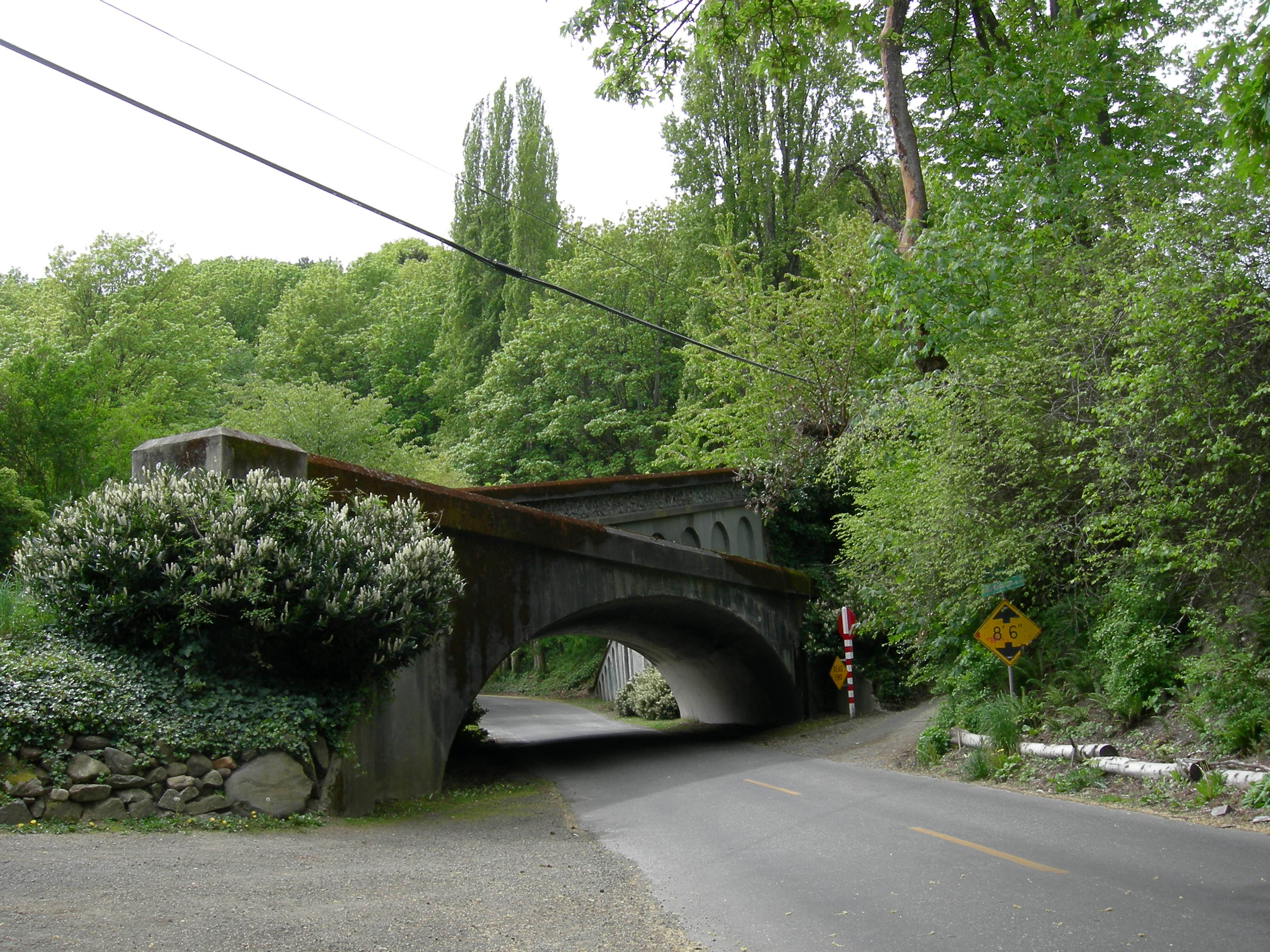
A surviving cable car bridge at Leschi Park

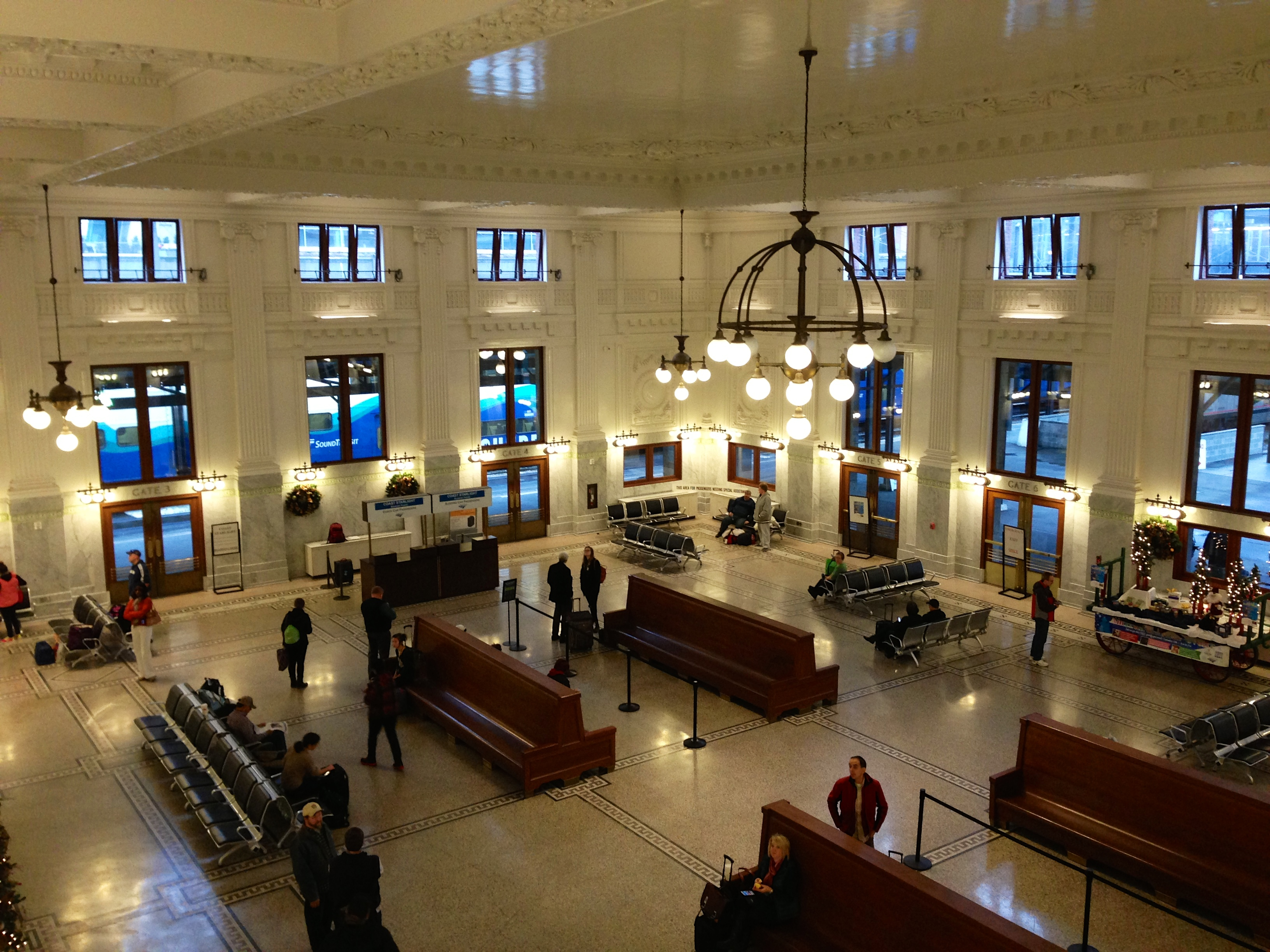
Interior of King Street Station

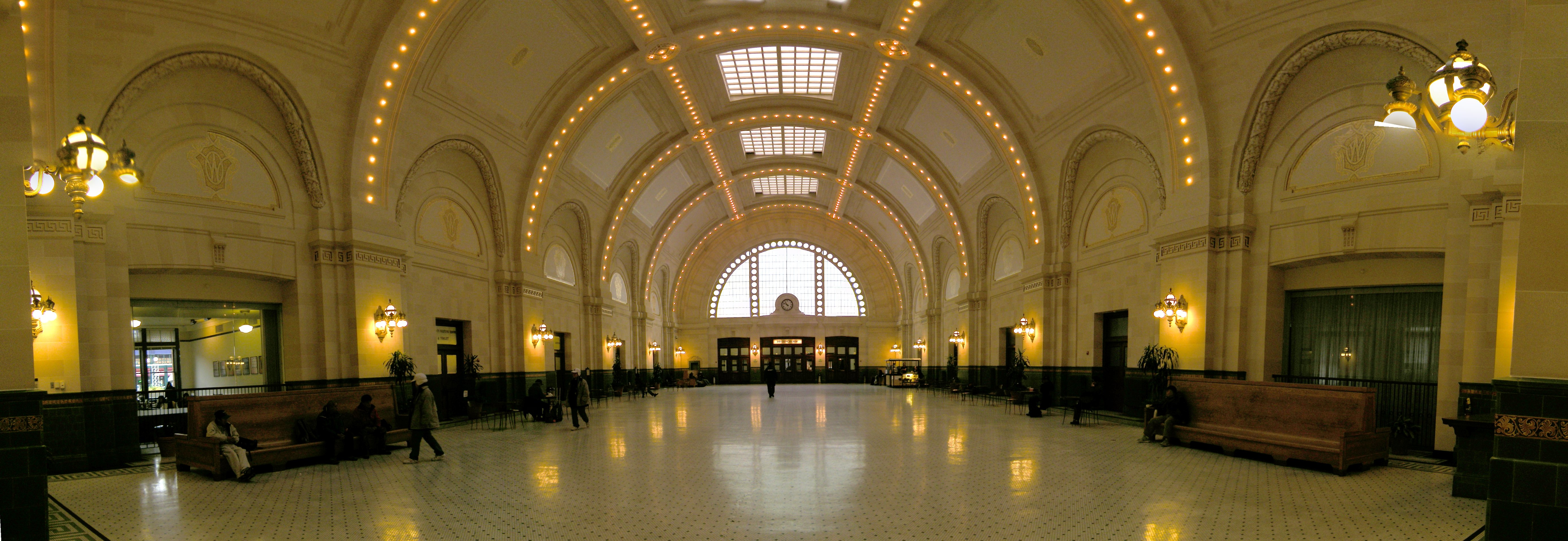
Interior of Union Station

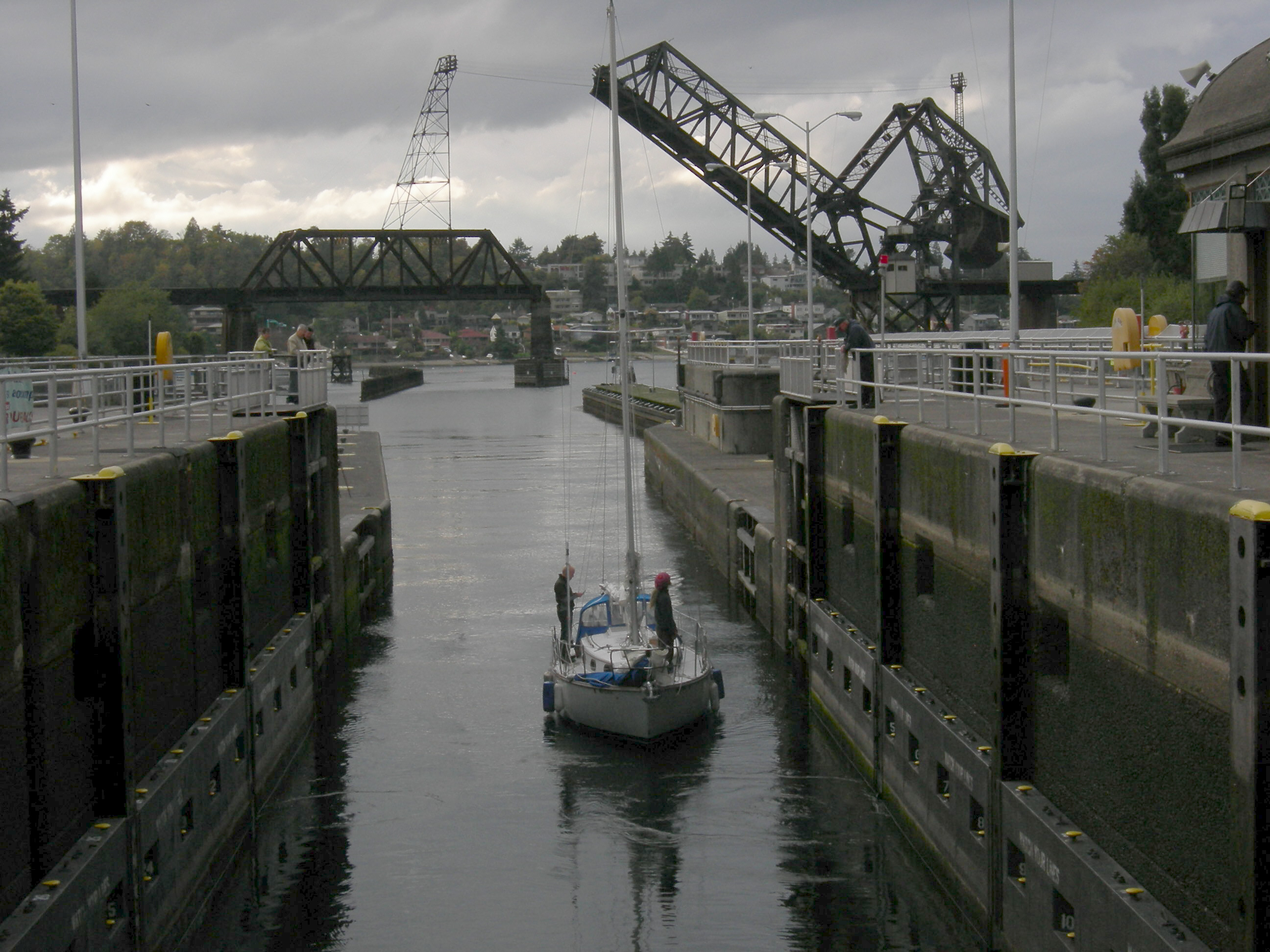
Hiram M. Chittenden Locks and Salmon Bay Bridge

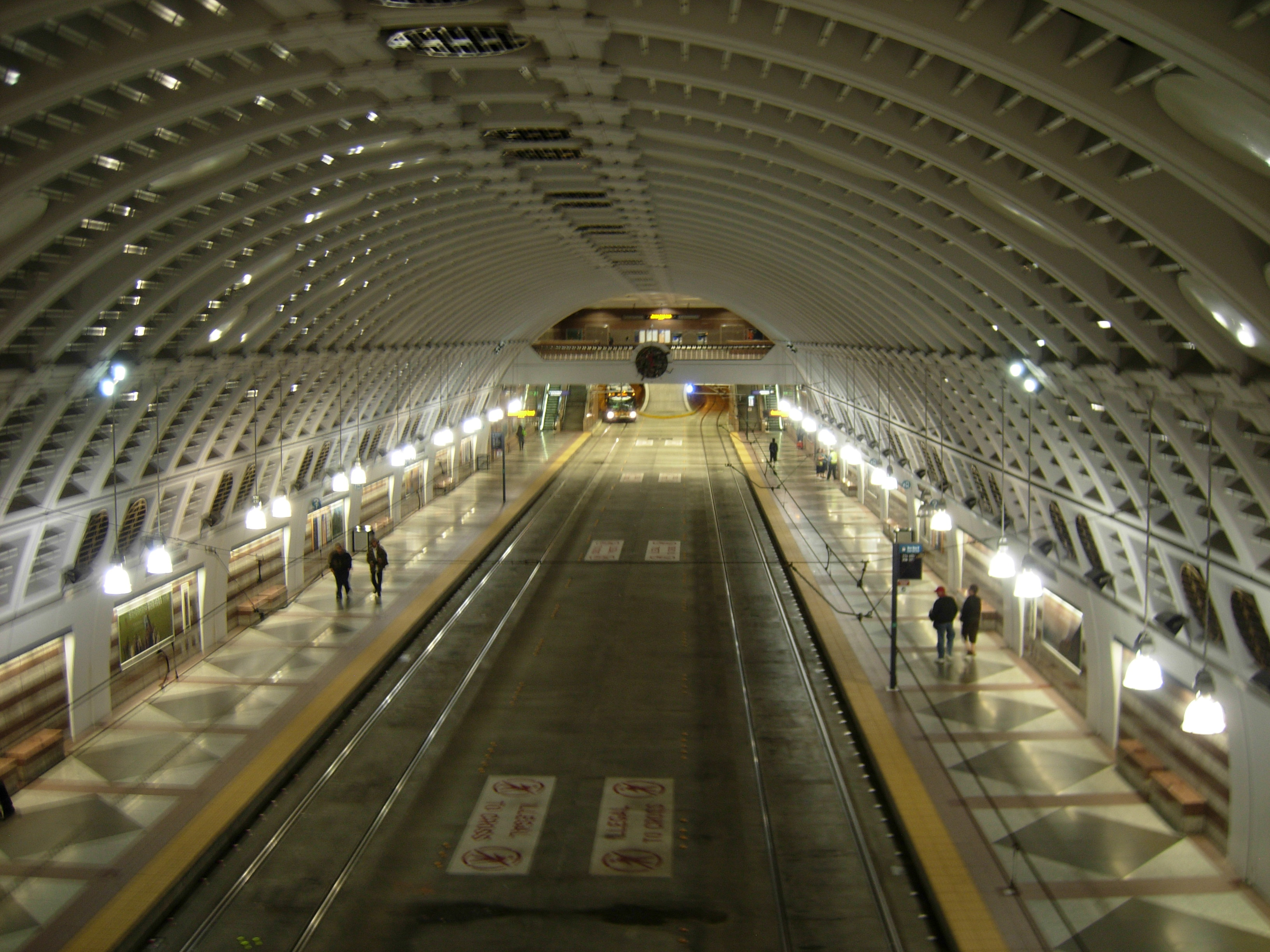
Pioneer Square station, Downtown Seattle Transit Tunnel

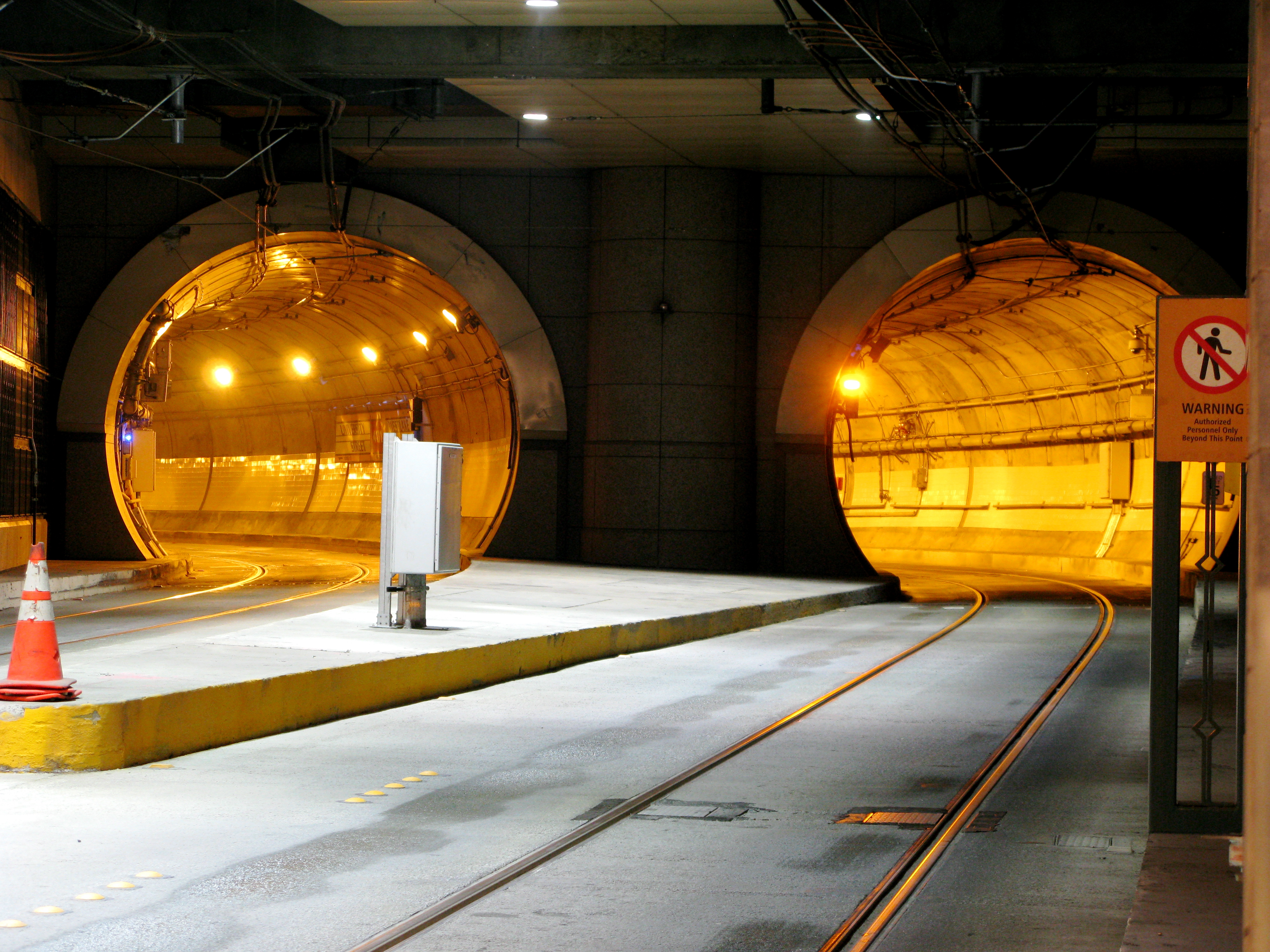
Southbound portal, Westlake station, Downtown Seattle Transit Tunnel

== Parks buildings and community and cultural centers ==
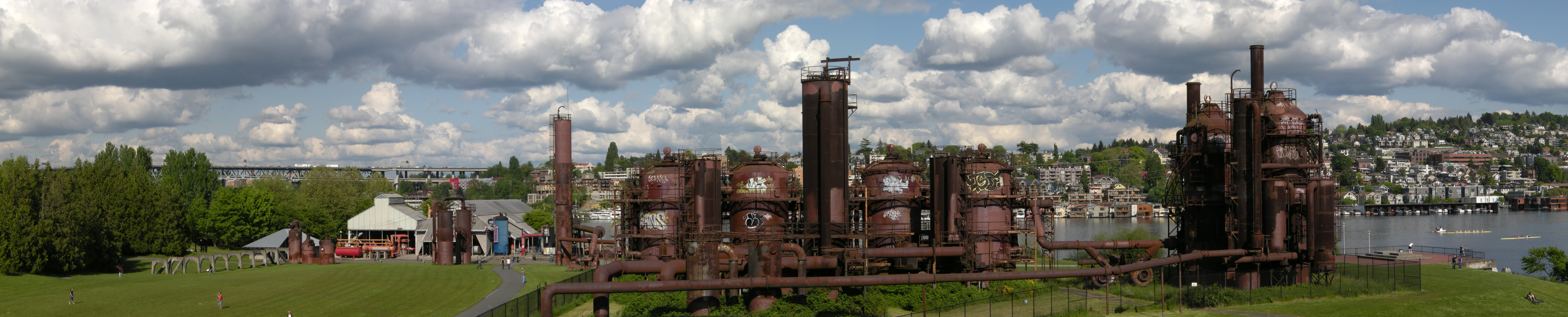
Richard Haag's design for Gas Works Park retained the refinery towers; it won an American Society of Landscape Architects (ASLA) President's Award for Design Excellence. In an unusual turn of events, it was listed on the National Register of Historic Places more than a decade after being nominated.
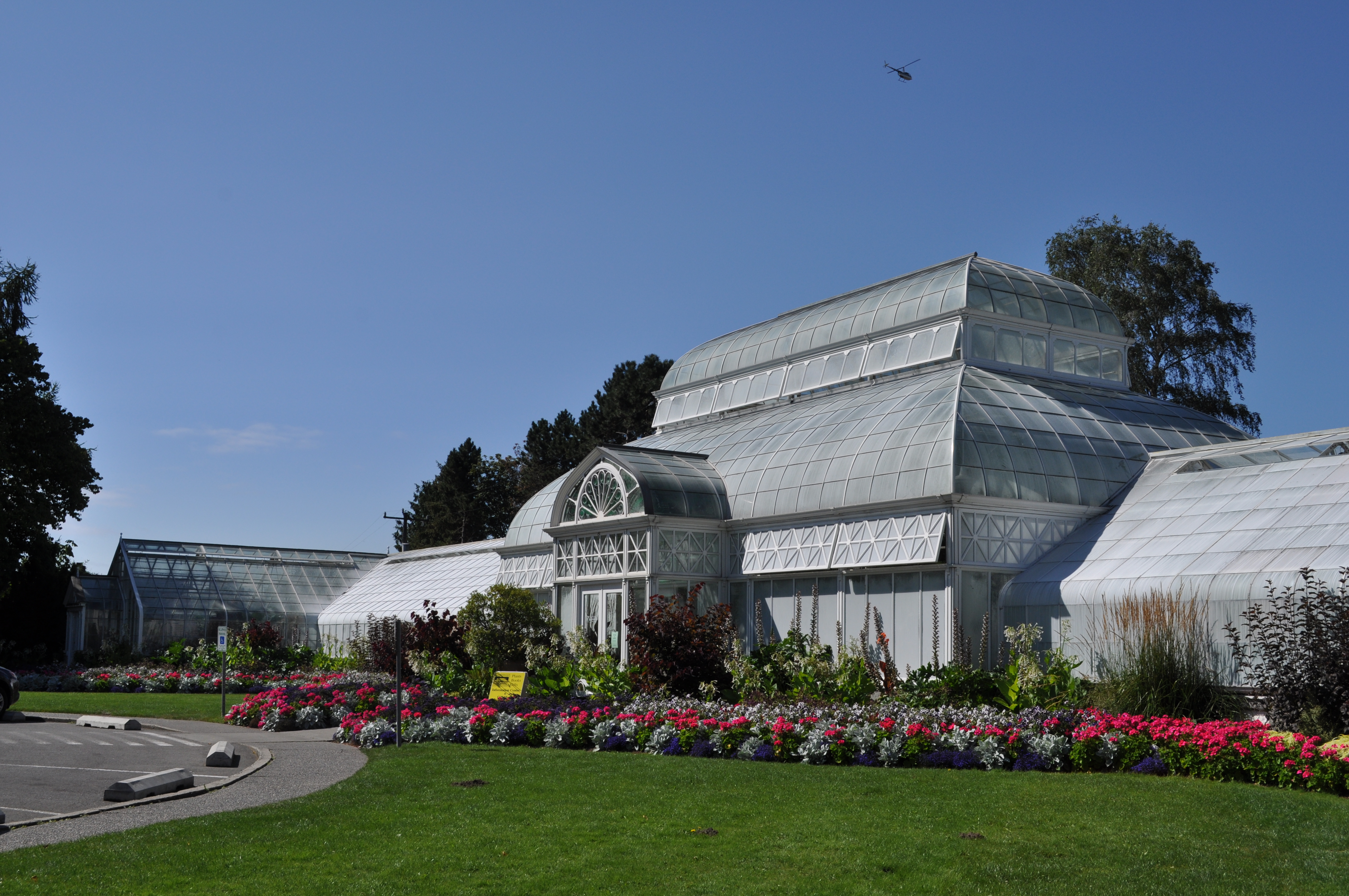
Volunteer Park Conservatory

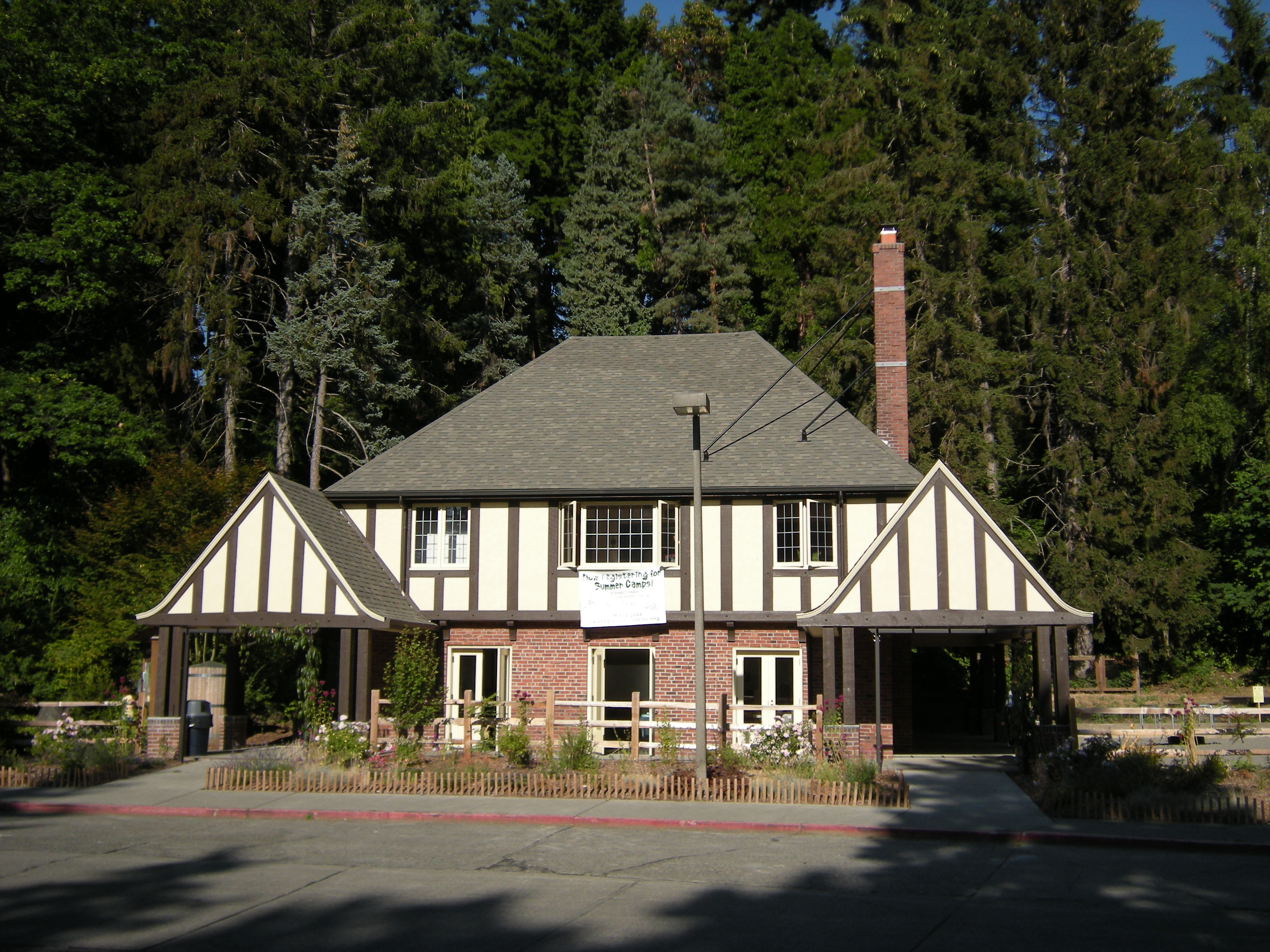
Seward Park Inn, Seward Park

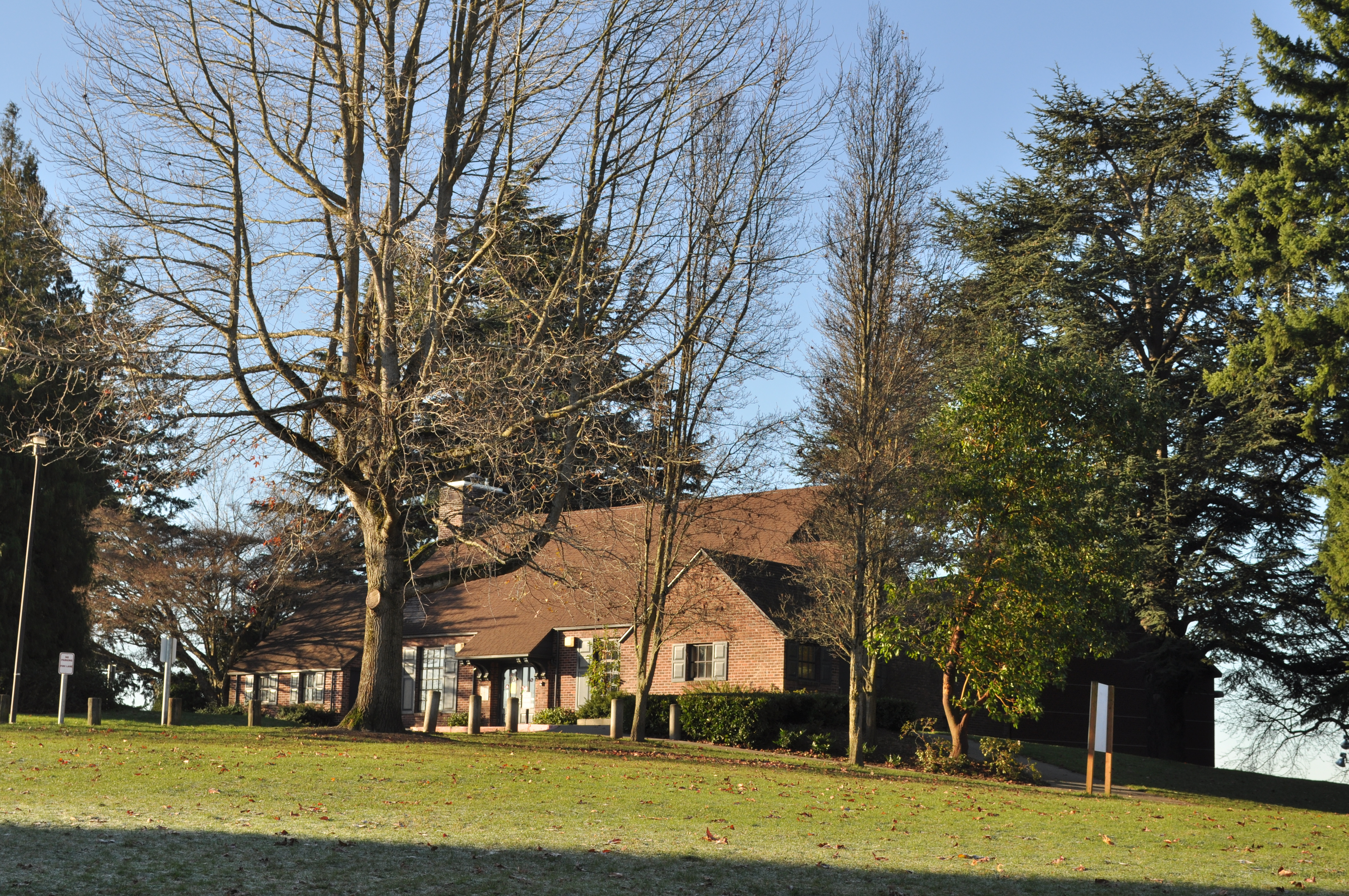
Laurelhurst Community Center

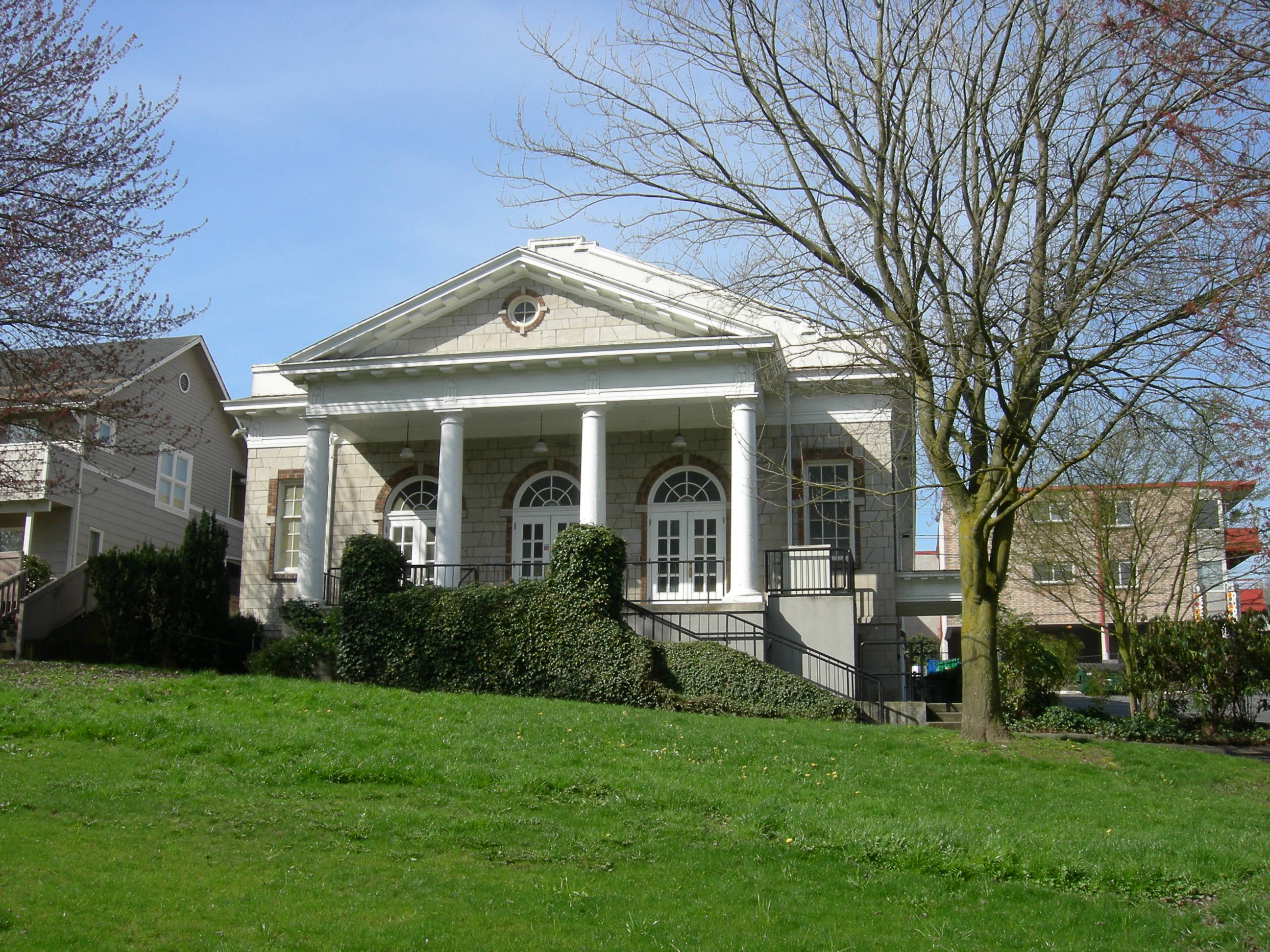
Rainier Valley Cultural Center, a former Christian Science church

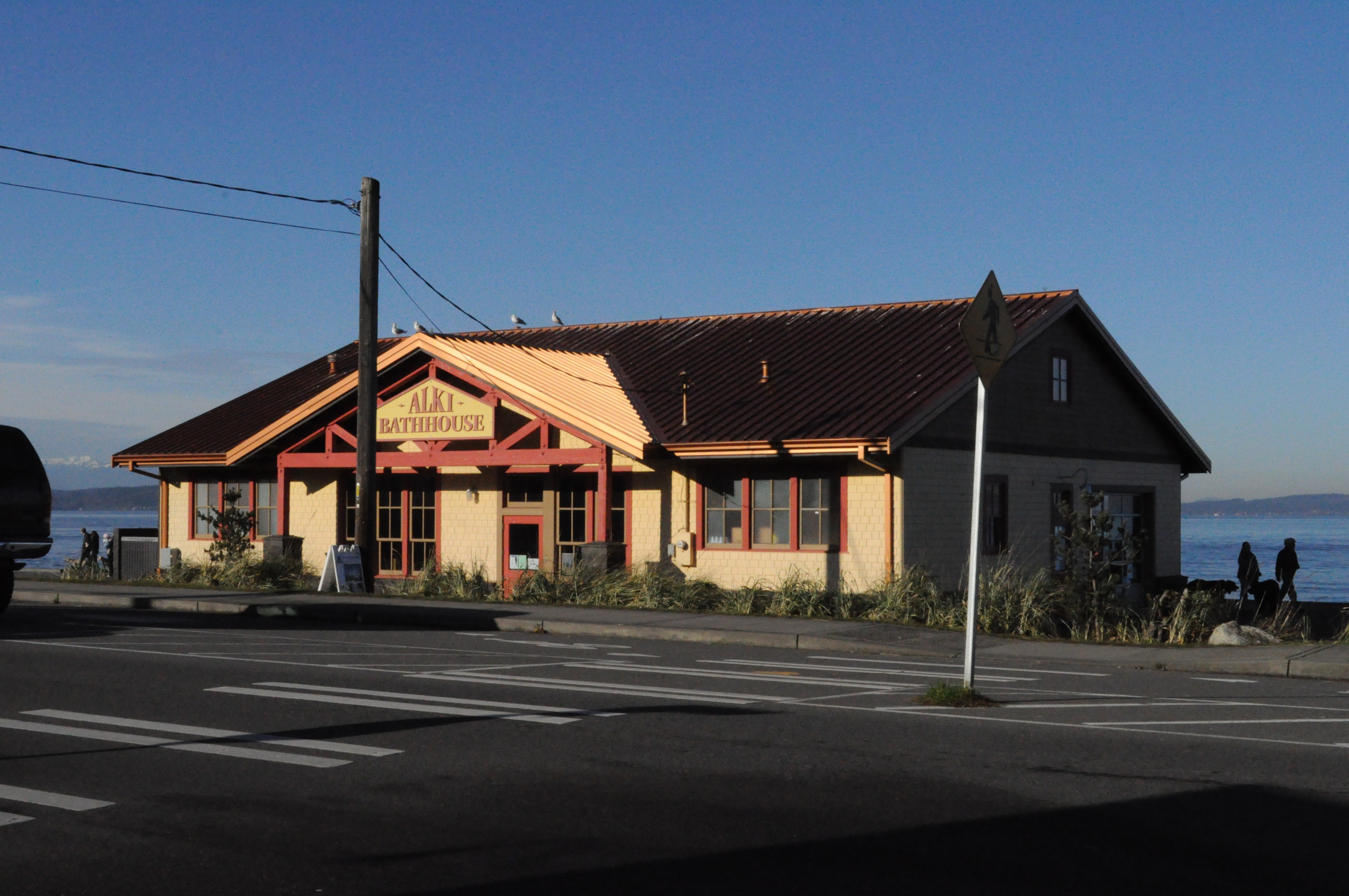
Former bathhouse, Alki Beach

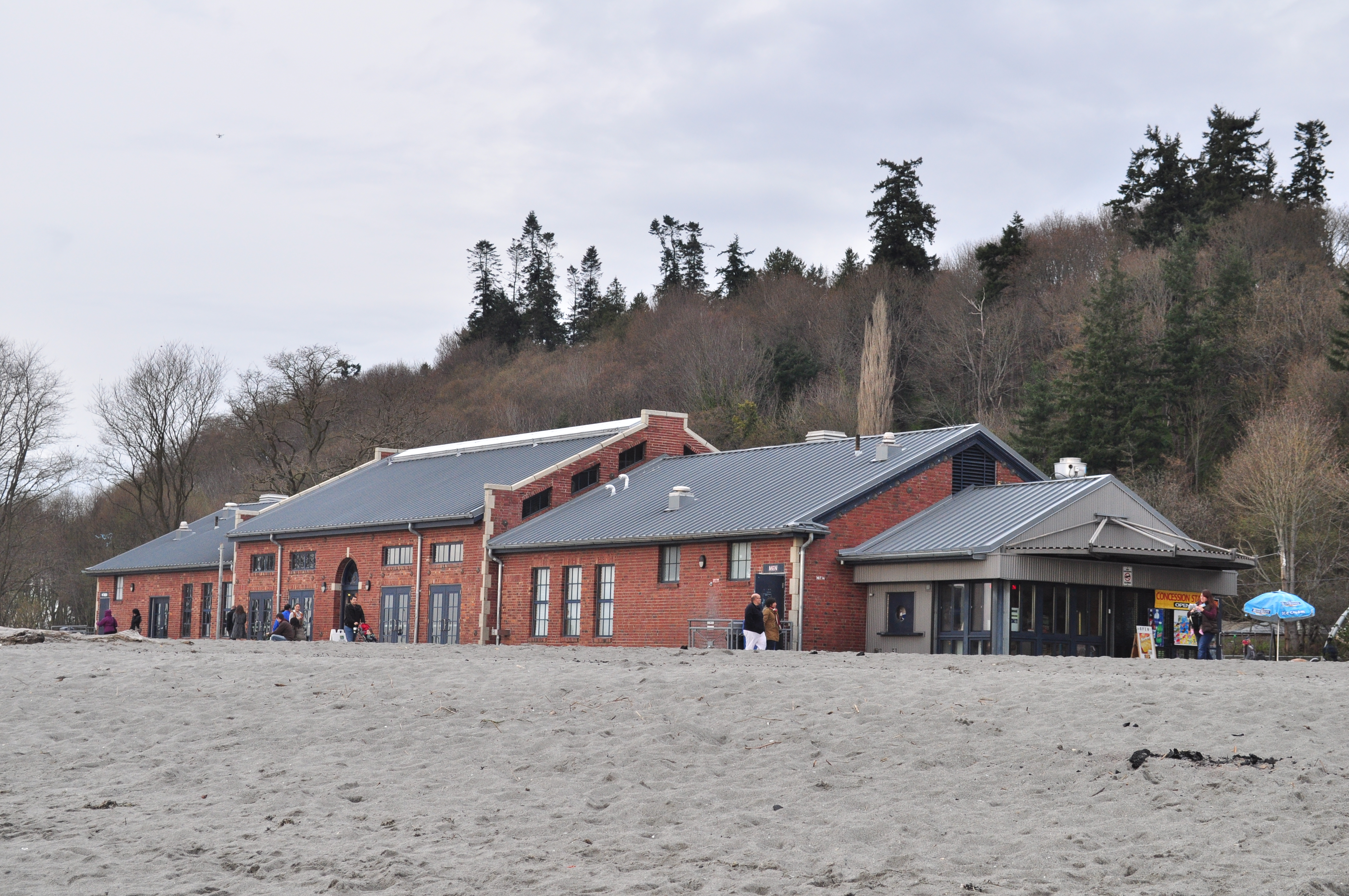
Former bathhouse, Golden Gardens

== Official landmarks ==
In the late 1960s, in reaction to proposed radical redevelopment of Pioneer Square and Pike Place Market, numerous individuals and organization agitated for a more preservationist approach. These two districts were designated as "historic" by the city in 1970 and 1971, respectively, and the city established what is now the Landmarks Preservation Board 1973, seven years after the federal government passed the National Historic Preservation Act.

The City of Seattle grants landmark status independent of the NRHP, and As of 2015 has done so for over 450 buildings and structures, as well as eight historic districts. As of 2015 there are over 175 Seattle buildings, structures, and districts on the National Register of Historic Places (NRHP). A given building may have either status, both or neither. Many buildings discussed and depicted in this article have NRHP or Seattle Landmark status.

Any person or organization can normally begin the designation process to establish a Seattle Landmark, although if a building is rejected for landmark status then for the next five years only its owner may restart the process. If the board chooses to designate a property, a process of hearings and (potentially) appeals crafts a specific ordinance of controls and incentives, which ultimately comes before the city council to be voted on as an ordinance.

For some buildings, only the exterior is a designated landmark; for others, the interior is also included. Buildings and structures that are either landmarked in their own right or that fall within city-designated historic districts require a Certificate of Approval for any exterior change, addition or modification of signs, change of paint color, changes to the public right-of-way (e.g. sidewalk displays, street lights), etc.; in some cases such a certificate is required for establishment of a different business on the premises. In exchange, they may be exempted from various zoning and open space rules, and can transfer certain development rights more freely than other buildings. Also, when a landmark property is rehabilitated, the value of those improvements goes untaxed for up to a decade.

In contrast, NRHP designation does not restrict use, treatment, transfer, or disposition of private property, nor does the NRHP list properties whose owner objects. NRHP listing is mostly a matter of prestige, although there are some federal tax benefits for NRHP-listed commercial buildings.

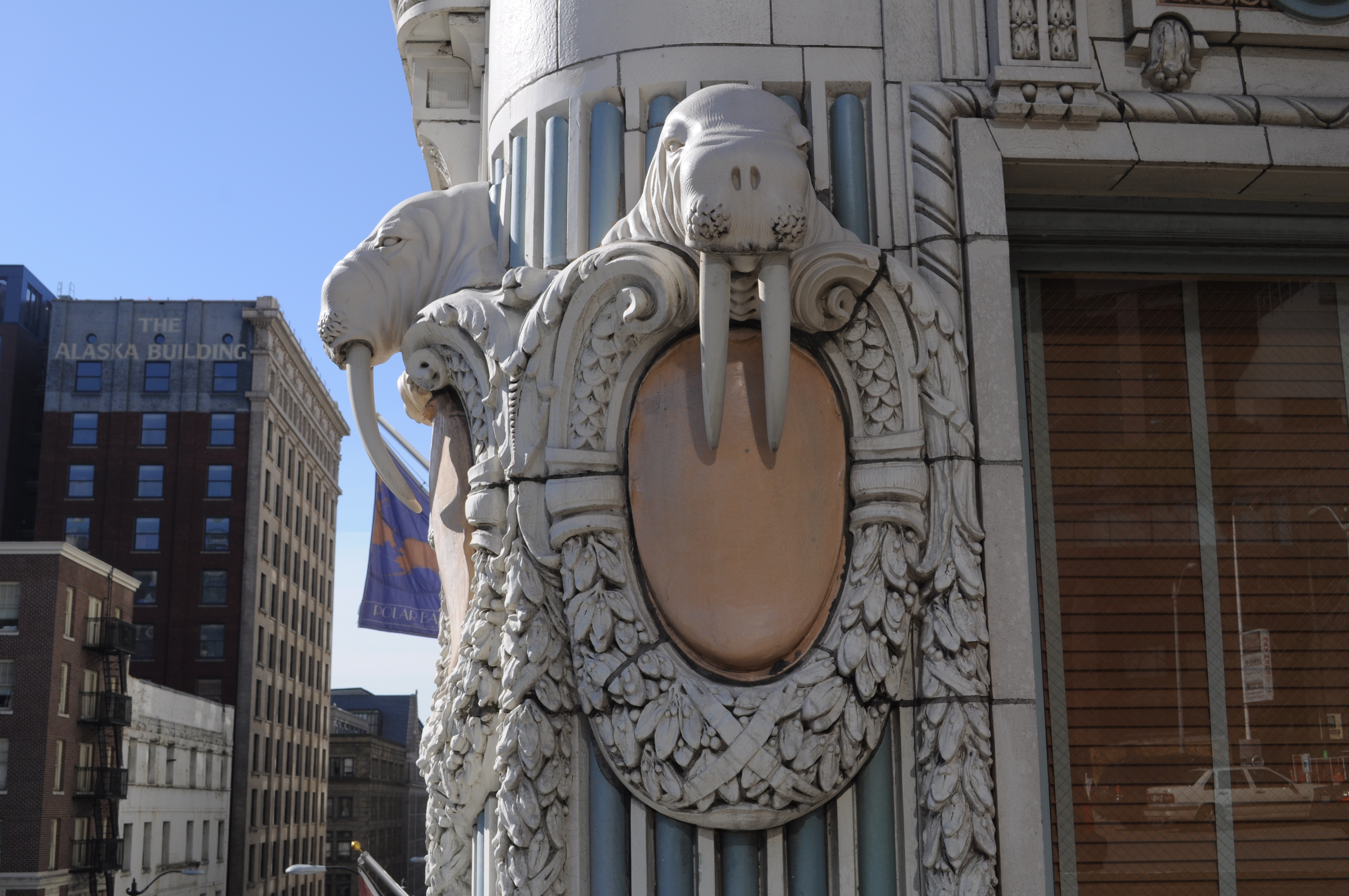
Terracotta detail, Arctic Building. The walrus's current tusks are plastic, as an earthquake safety precaution.

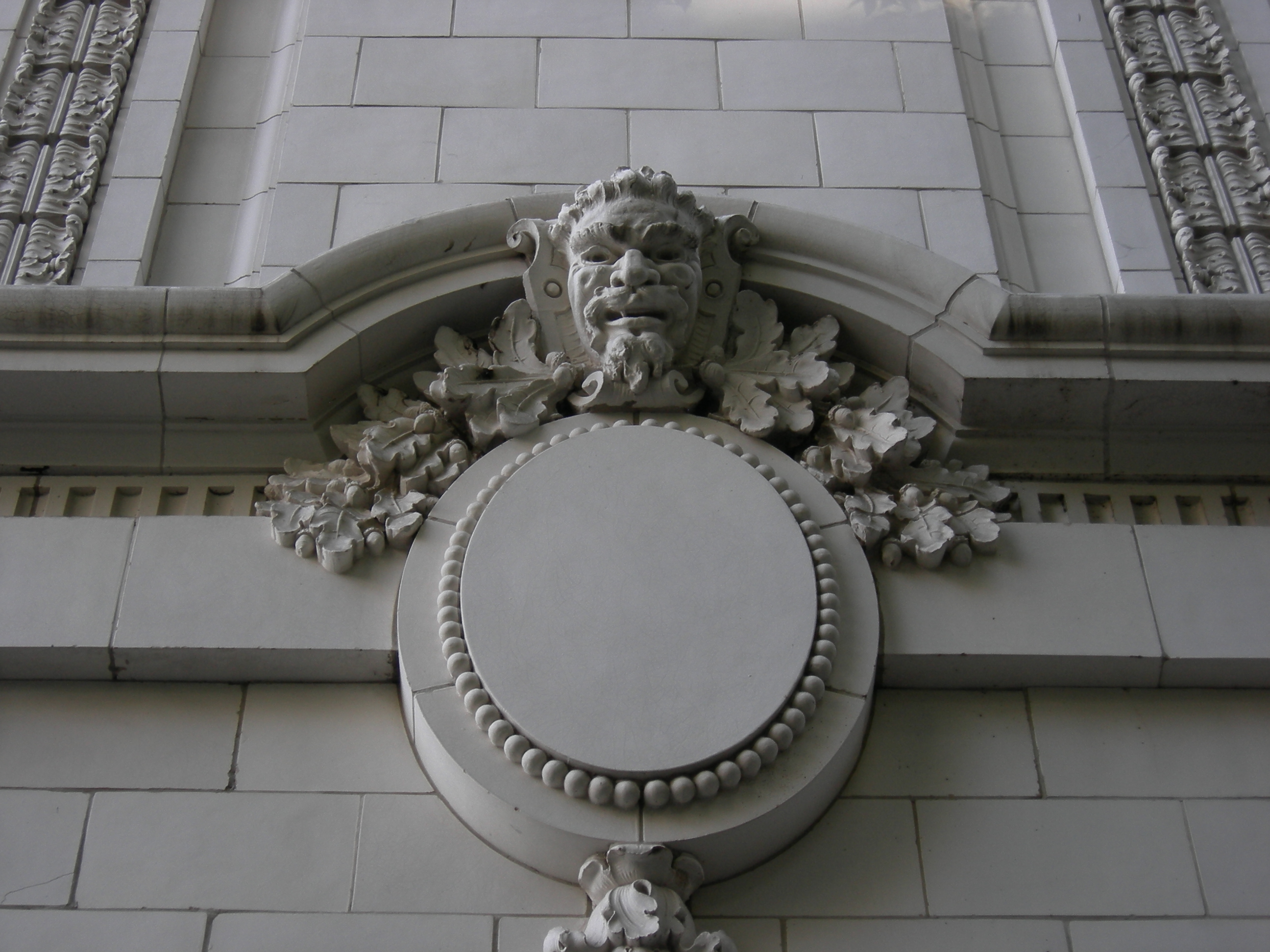
Terracotta detail, Coliseum Theater.

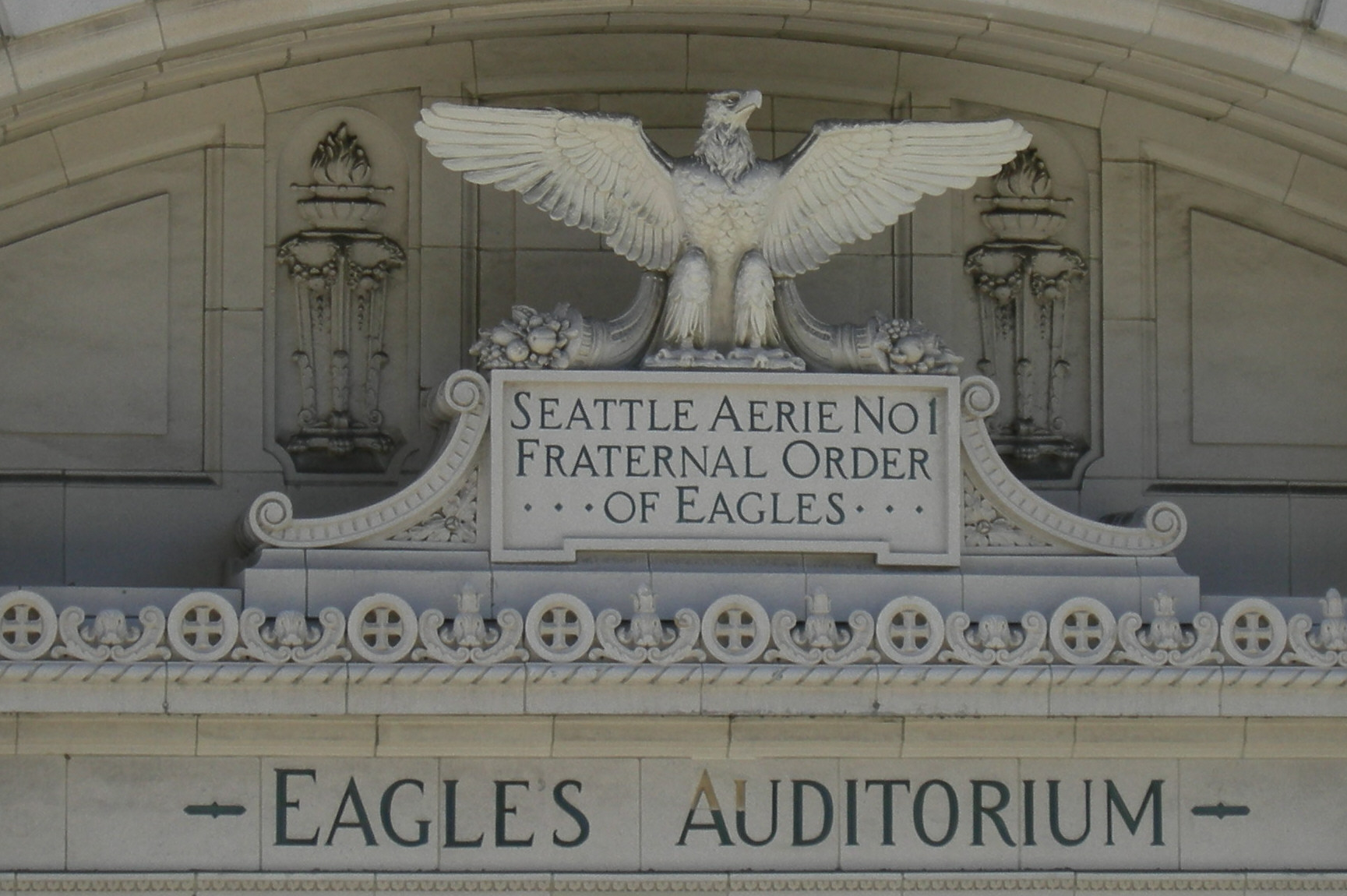
Terracotta detail, Eagles Auditorium Building.

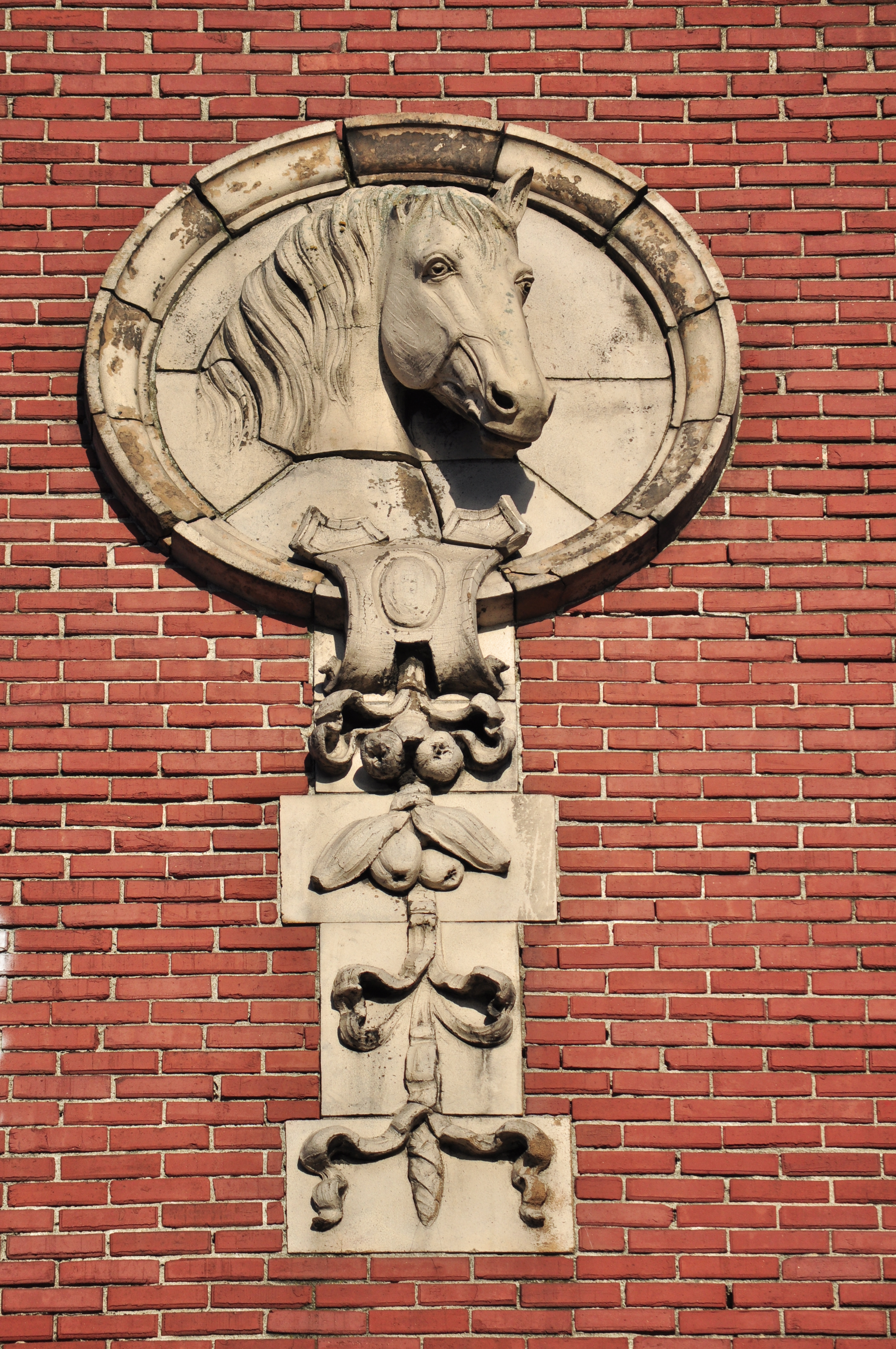
Terracotta detail, Union Stables

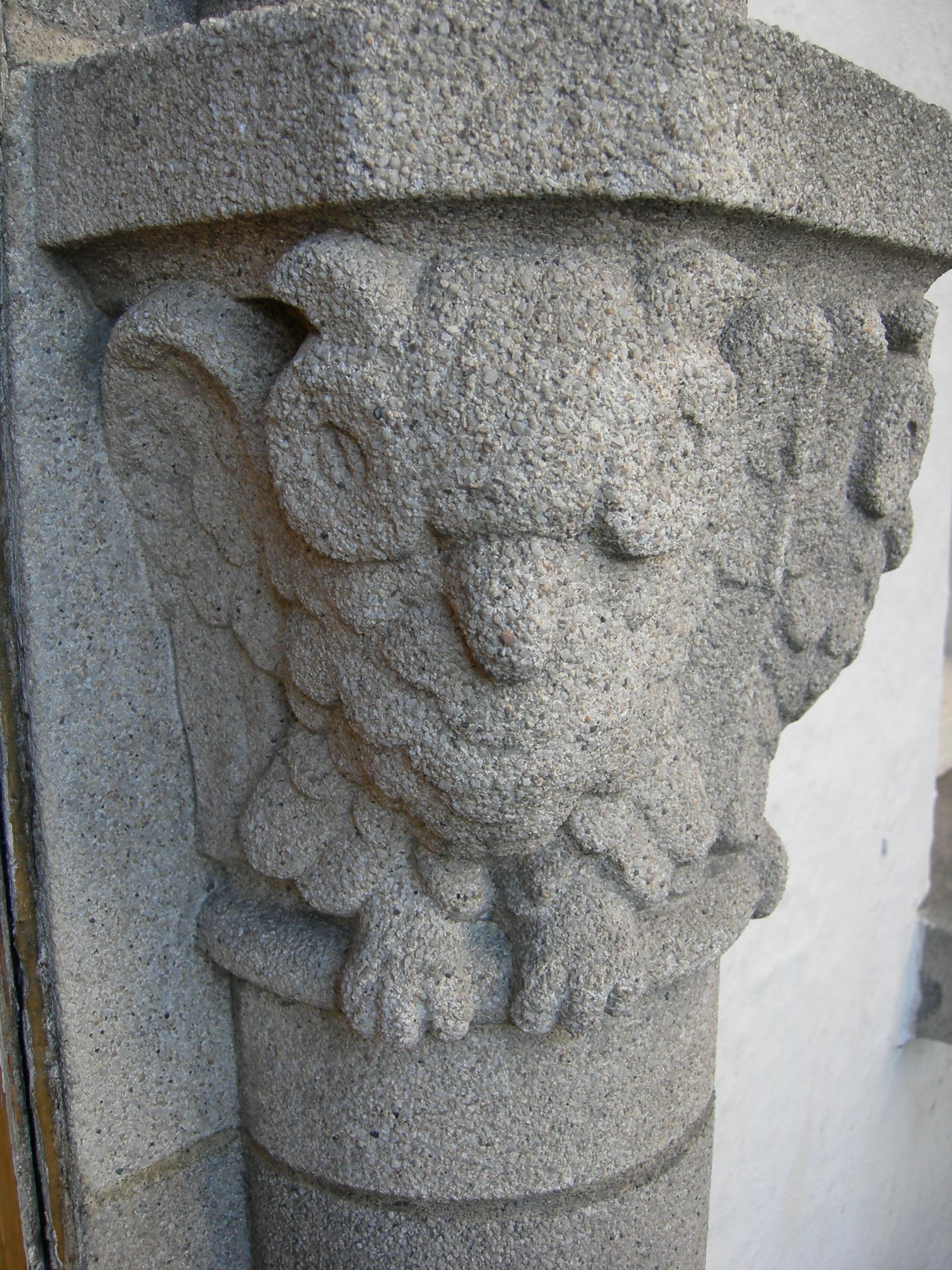
Stonework detail, 7th Church of Christ Scientist, Queen Anne Hill

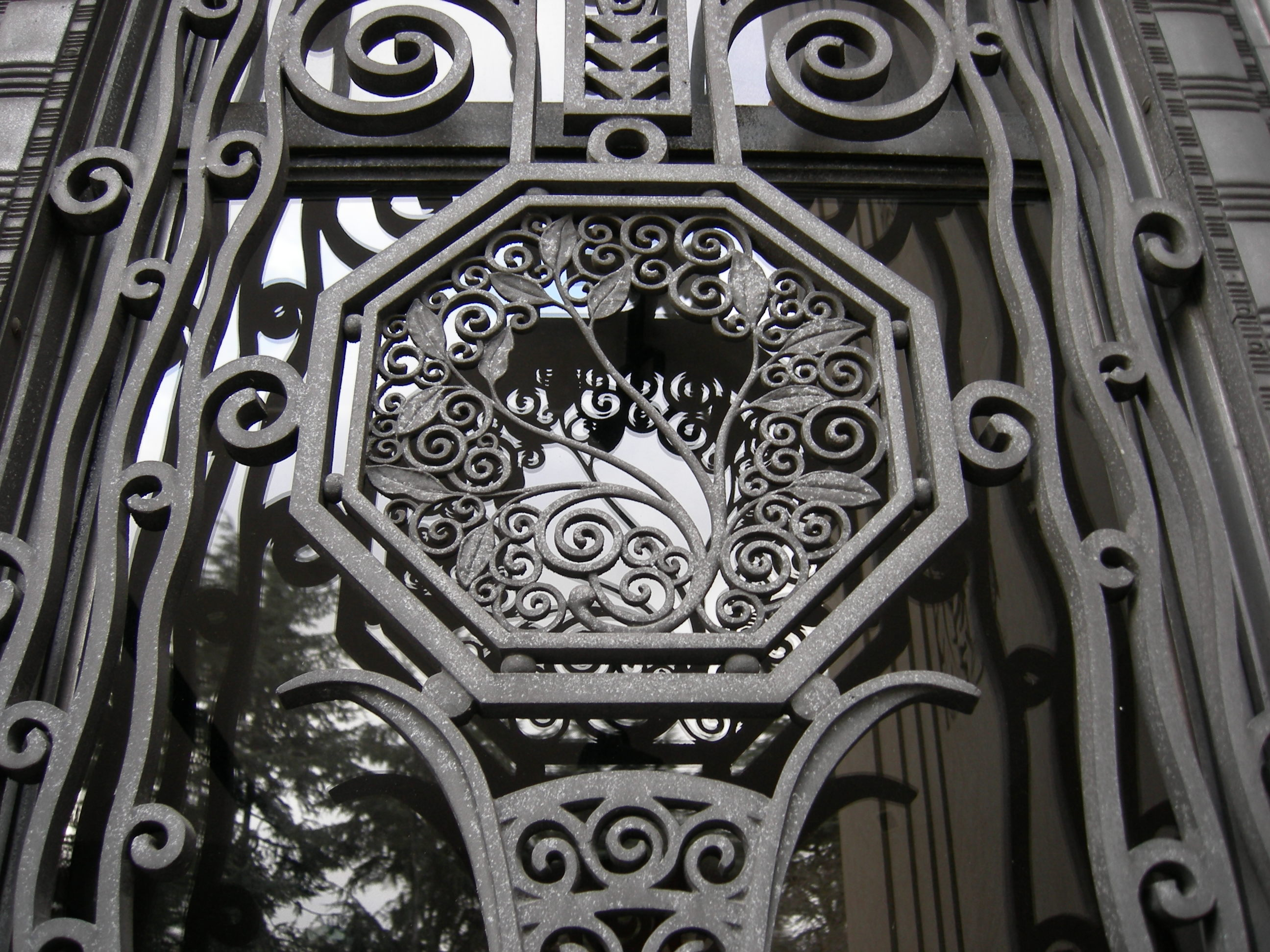
Ornamental grating, Seattle Times building, 1120 John Street (South Lake Union)

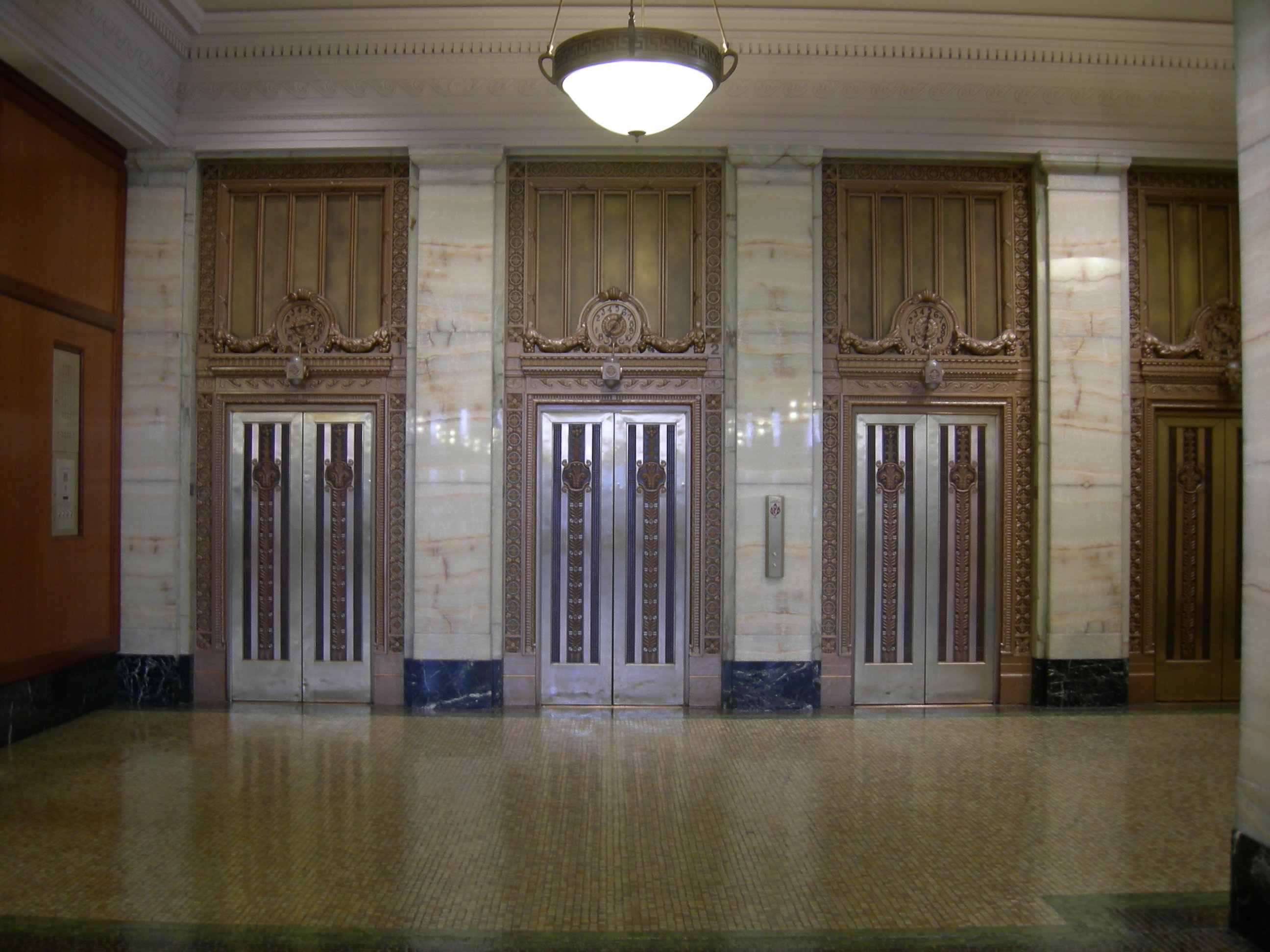
Elevator bank, Securities Building

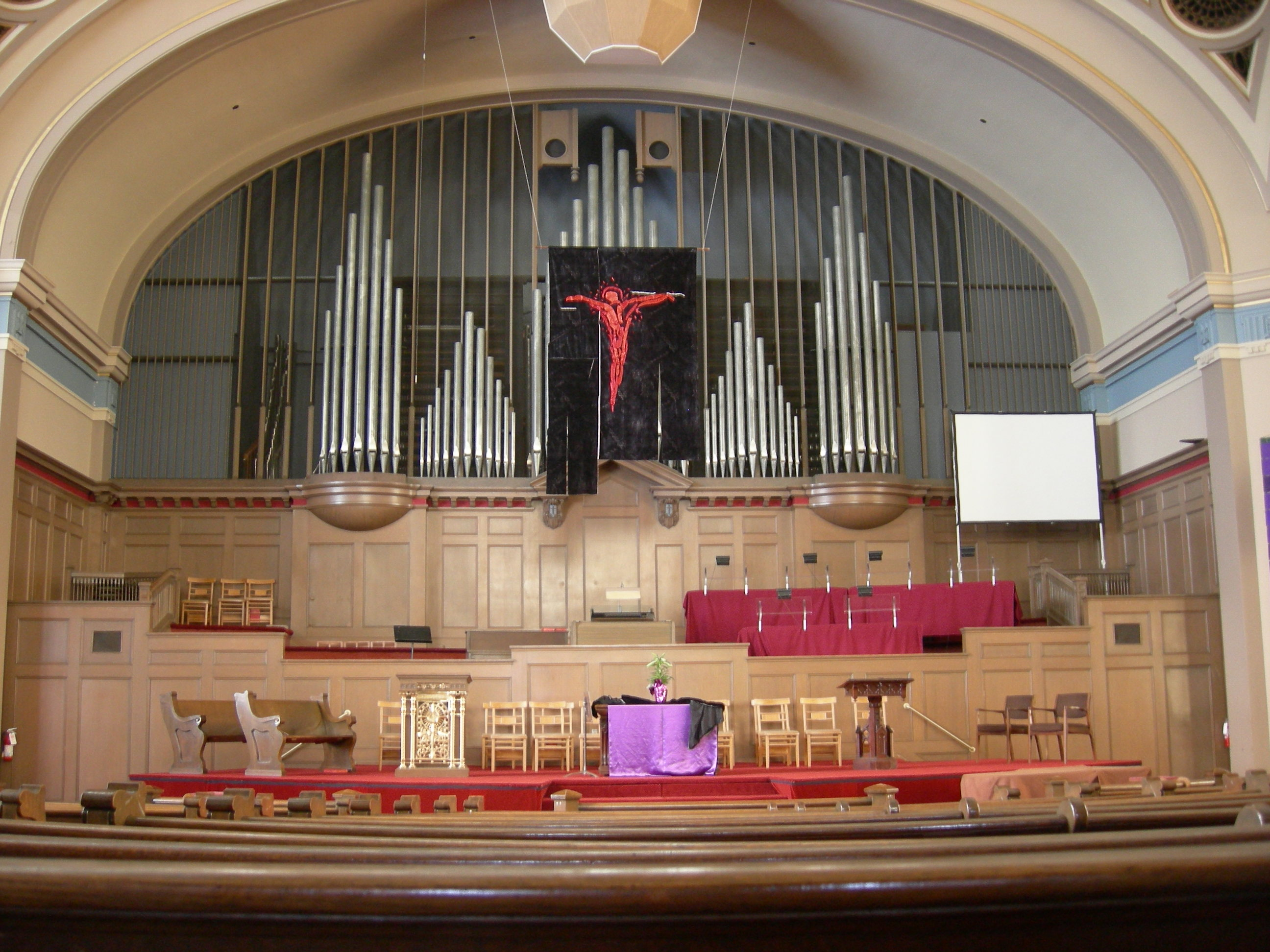
Interior, First United Methodist Church (photographed 2007; now Daniels Recital Hall)

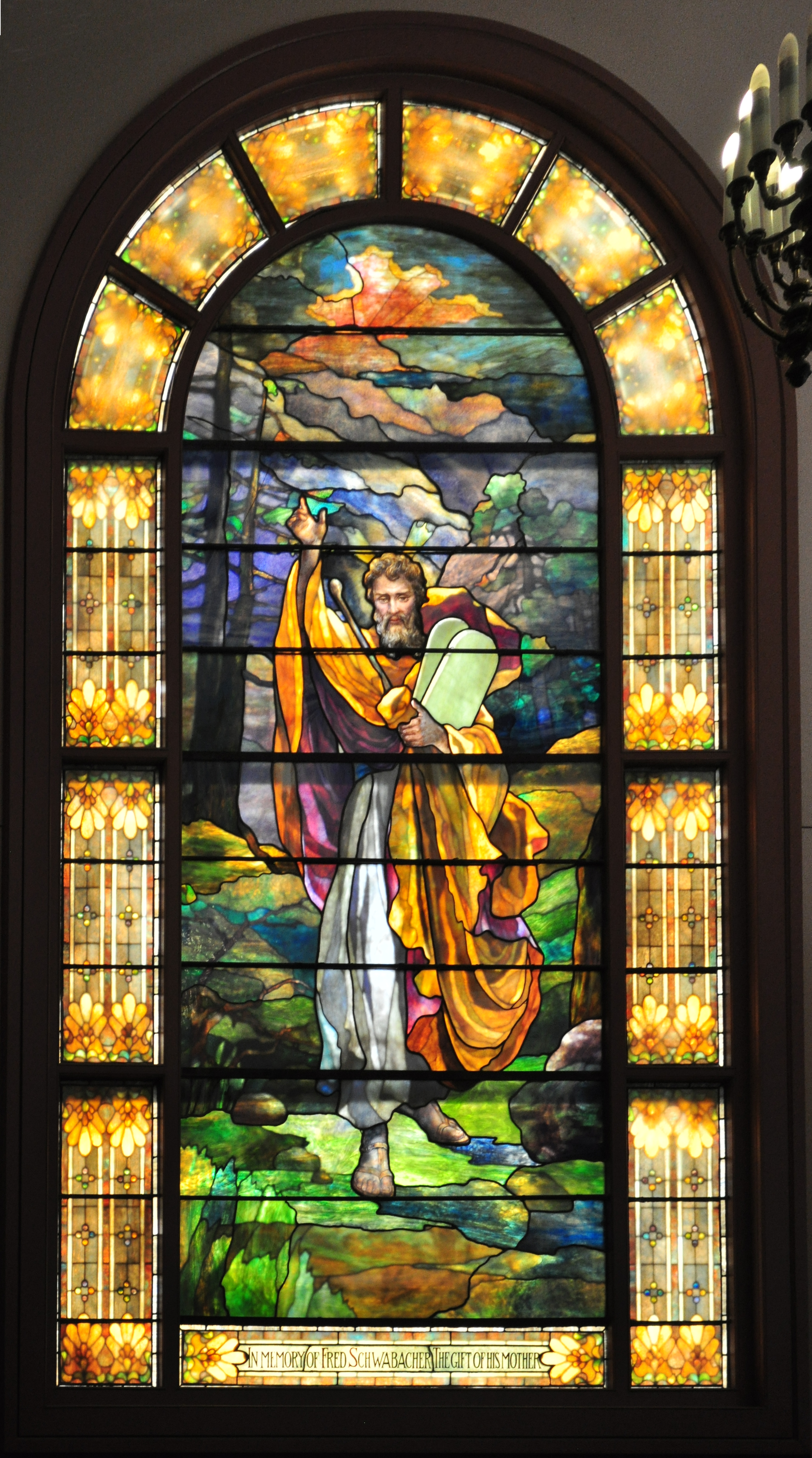
Stained glass of "Moses with the Tablets", a surviving piece of the old Temple De Hirsch, landmarked but nonetheless demolished.

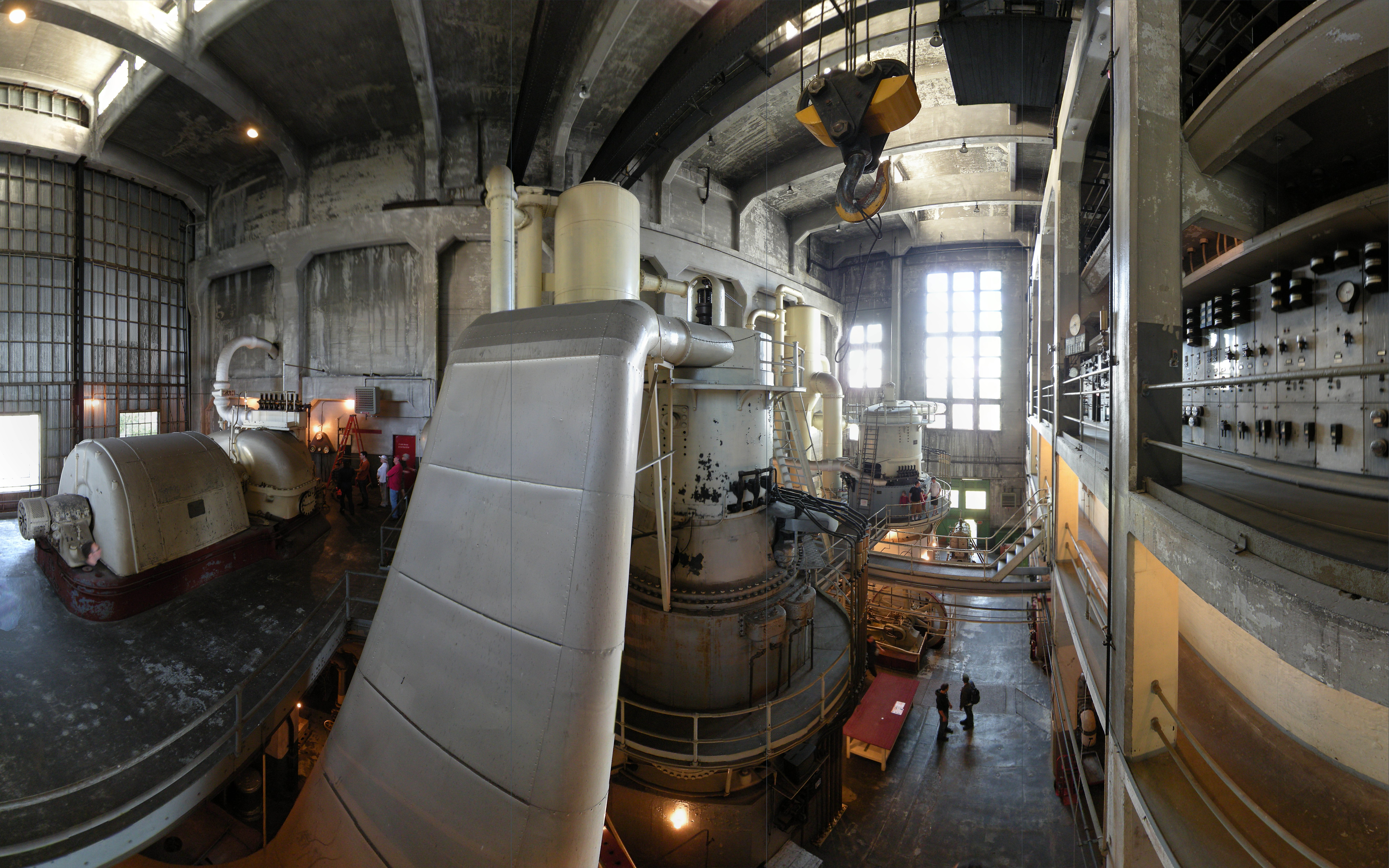
Interior, Georgetown PowerPlant Museum

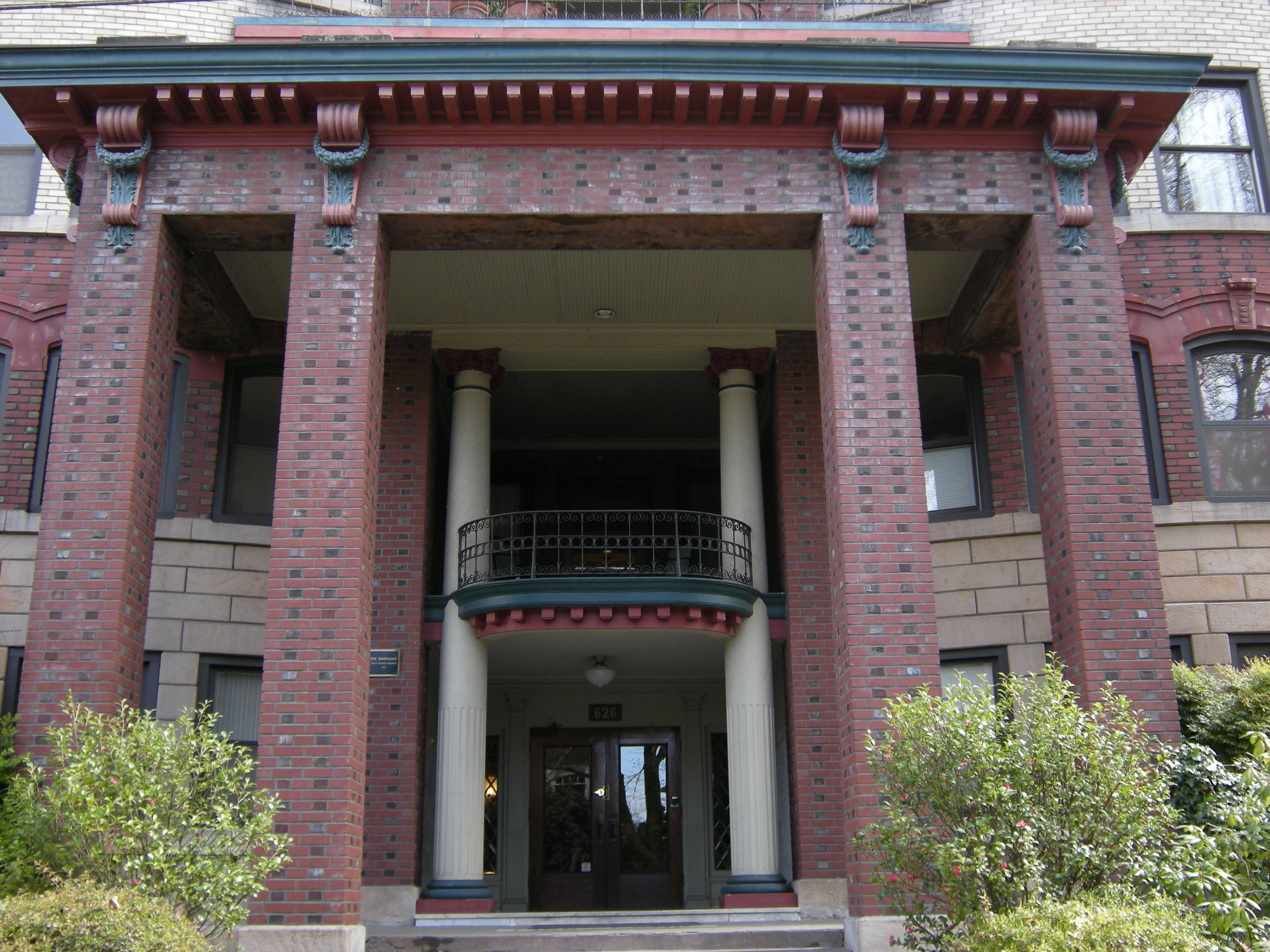
Entrance, Maryland Apartments (Capitol Hill)

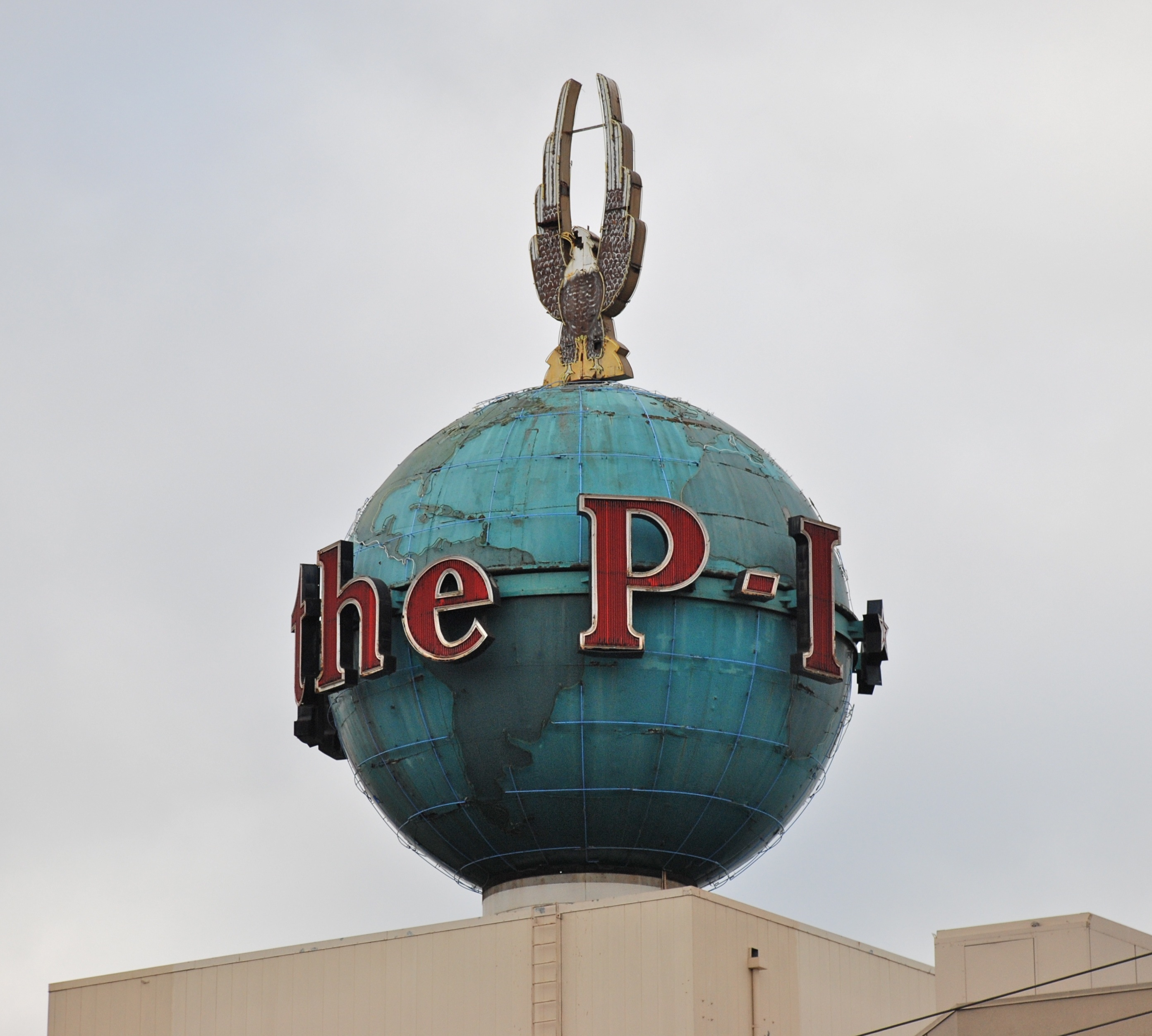
The "P-I Globe," symbol of the Seattle Post-Intelligencer, landmarked in its own right

== Façadism ==
Façadism is the practice where a building is almost entirely replaced, with only its original or reconstructed façade (or part of that) preserved. In some cases (such as the Auto Row buildings in the Pike-Pine corridor) new buildings have received height bonuses for preserving a façade. Knute Berger wrote in 2015, "Façadism is not a new phenomenon, but it's booming in Seattle these days." Eugenia Woo, director of preservation for Historic Seattle has remarked that "Façadism is NOT preservation. ... The result ... is often a strange hybrid building that does not meld the new and the old in a coherent manner. ...[W]e get the illusion of preservation with the pastiche of the old unsuccessfully jumbled with the new. While not demolition, façadism is less preservation and more a begrudging compromise between the past and the future."

The Allen Institute for Brain Science Building in South Lake Union is an intermediate case between preservation and reconstruction of a façade. It incorporates elements of the Ford McKay Building (Warren H. Milner, 1922) and Pacific McKay Building (Harlan Thomas and Clyde Grainger, 1925). These buildings with Seattle Landmark status were completely torn down in 2009; 2,760 pieces of terracotta and other elements were saved for reuse in an otherwise completely new building on the same site, and were incorporated in a new structure, with modern structural walls and modern doors and windows designed to resemble the originals. The new building also largely reproduces the interior of the auto showroom on the corner of Westlake and Mercer.

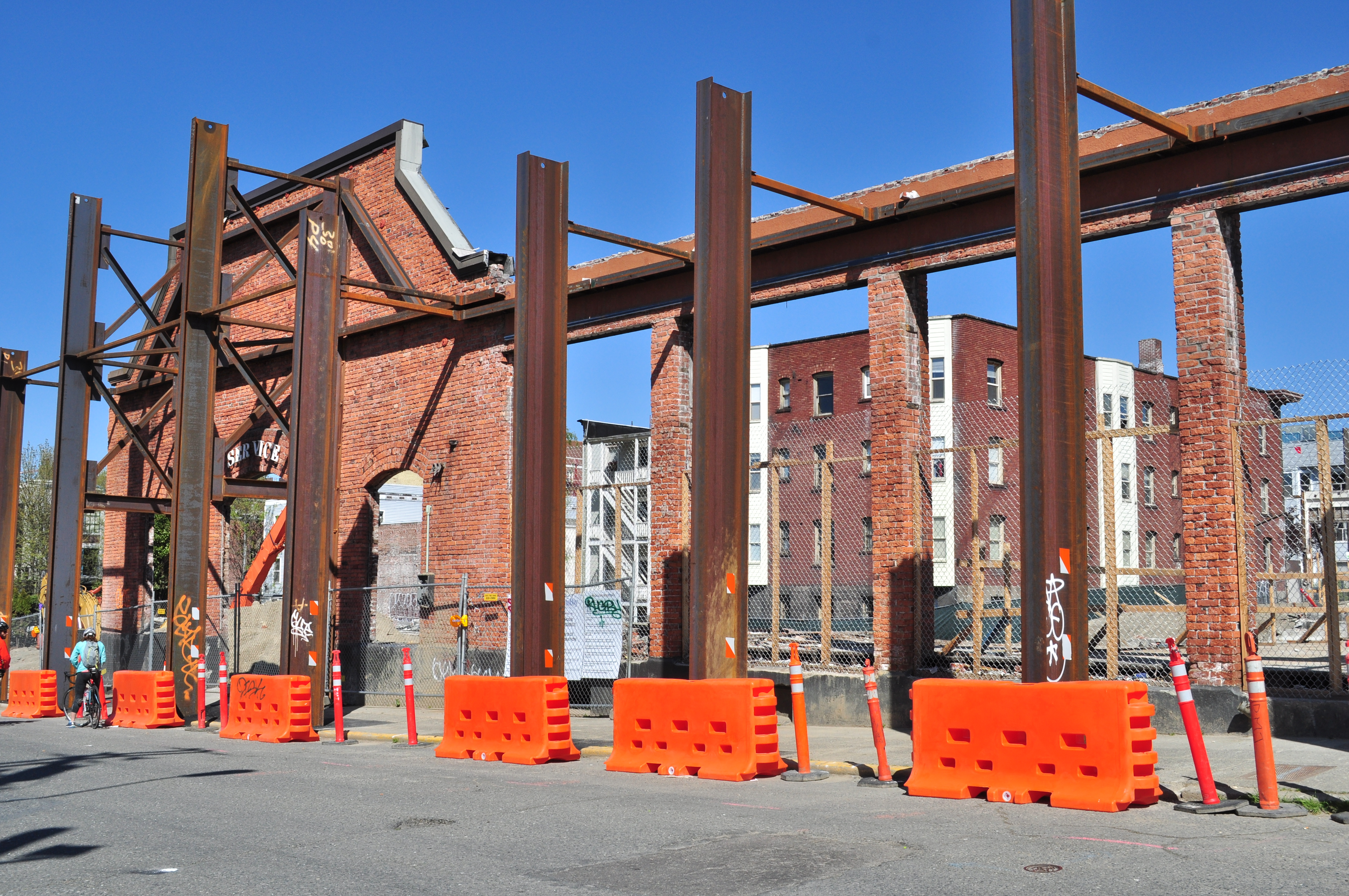
Preserving part of the façade of the former Phil Smart Mercedes in the Pike-Pine corridor on Capitol Hill

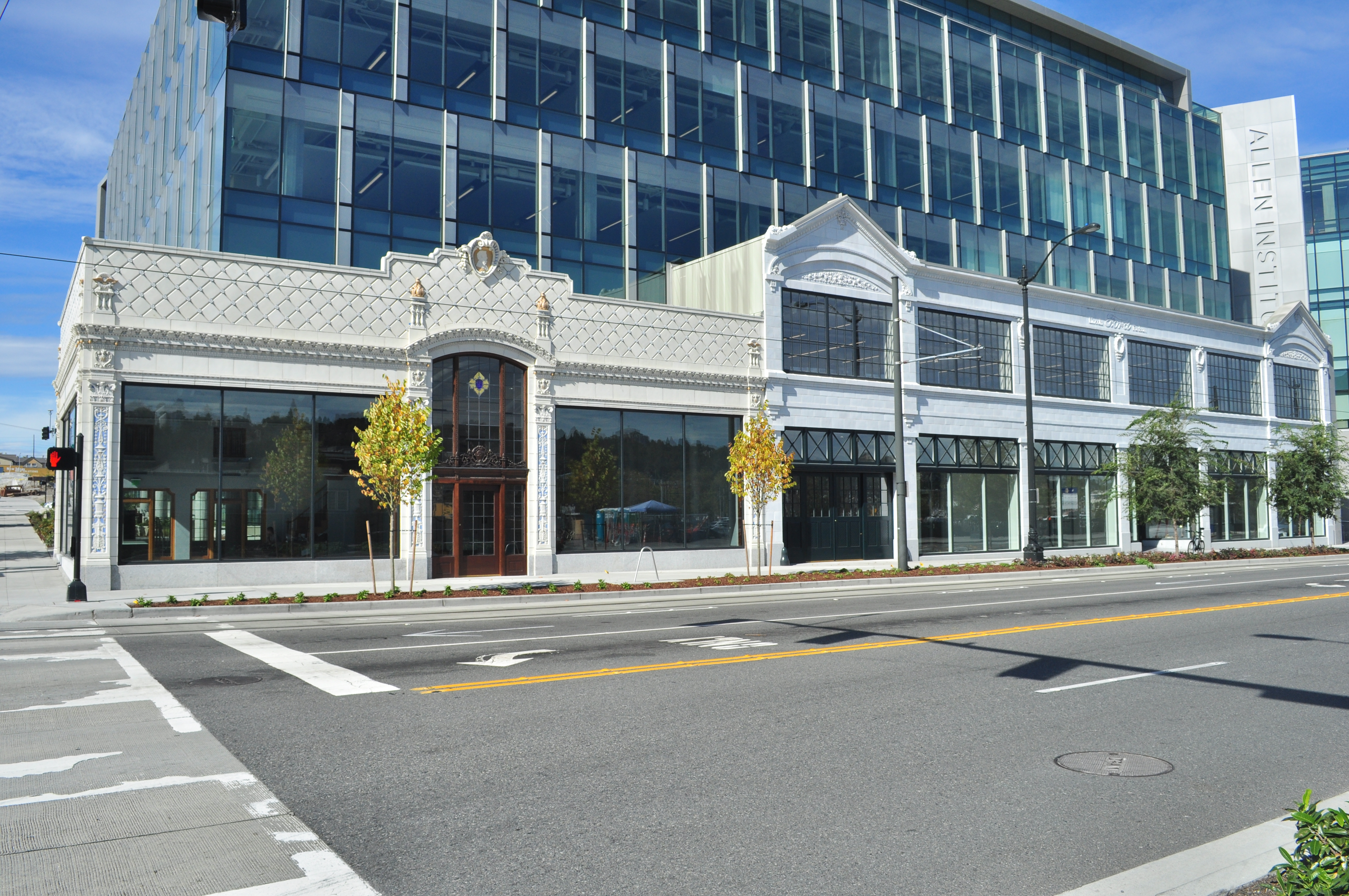
The Allen Institute for Brain Science Building in South Lake Union incorporates elements of the Ford McKay Building and Pacific McKay Building.

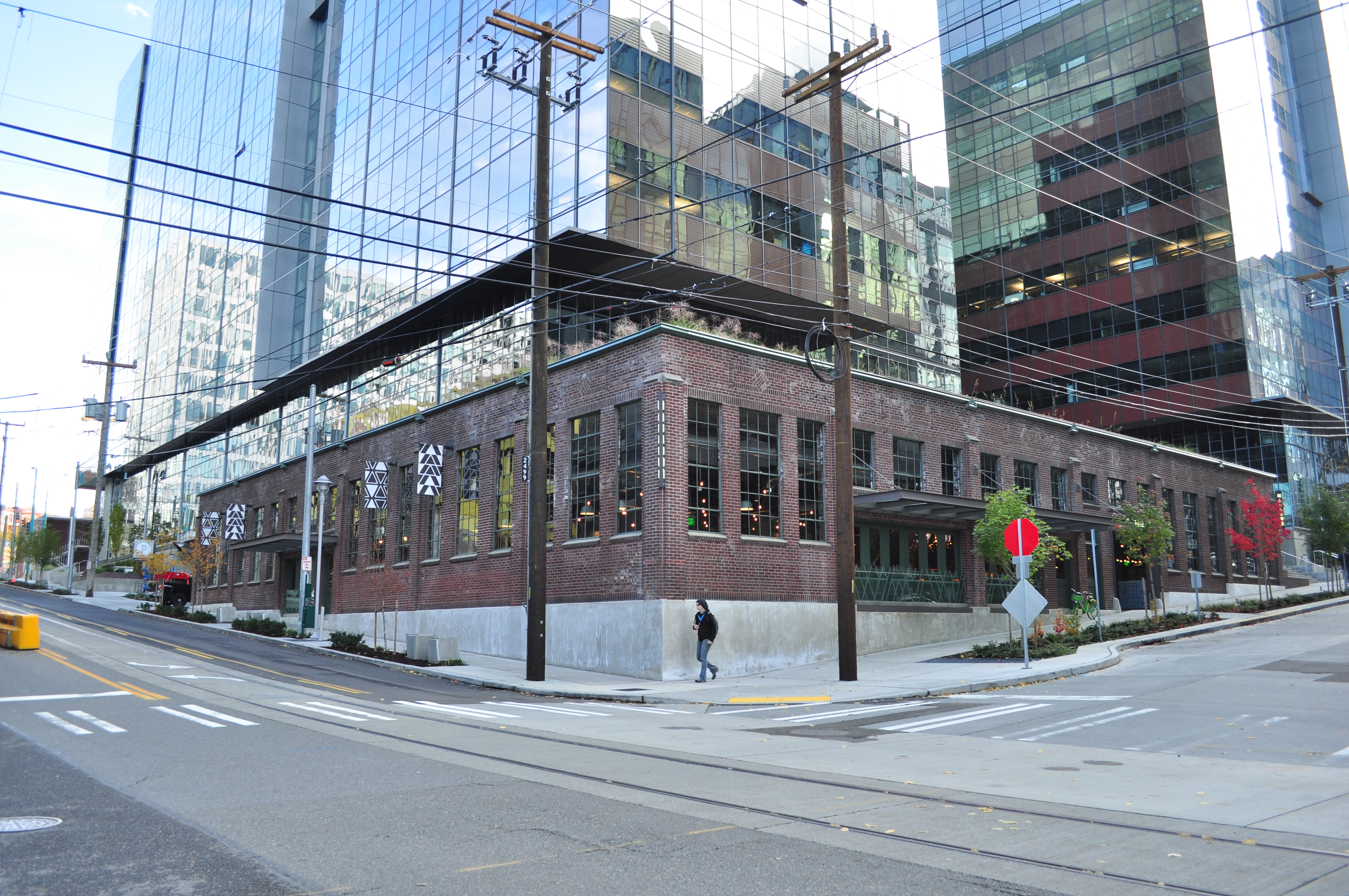
The façade of the old Boren Investment Company Warehouse incorporated into the Troy Block

== Maritime and industrial architecture ==
- The two historic Rainier breweries
- Boeing
- Shipyards
- Piers
- Port of Seattle buildings, including Pier 66 and Fishermen's Terminal
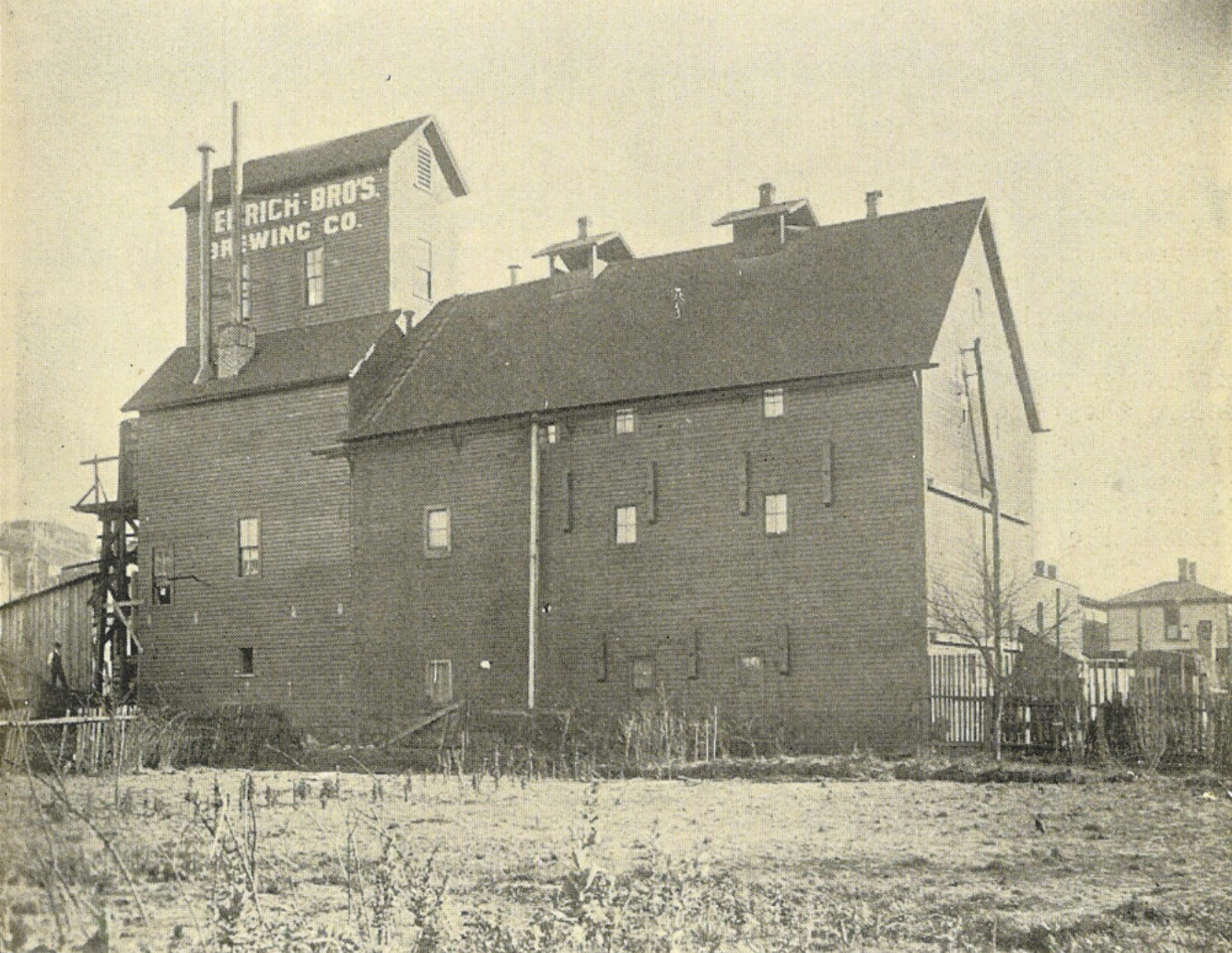
The Hemrich Bros. brewery in South Lake Union, shown here in 1900, demolished in the 1920s

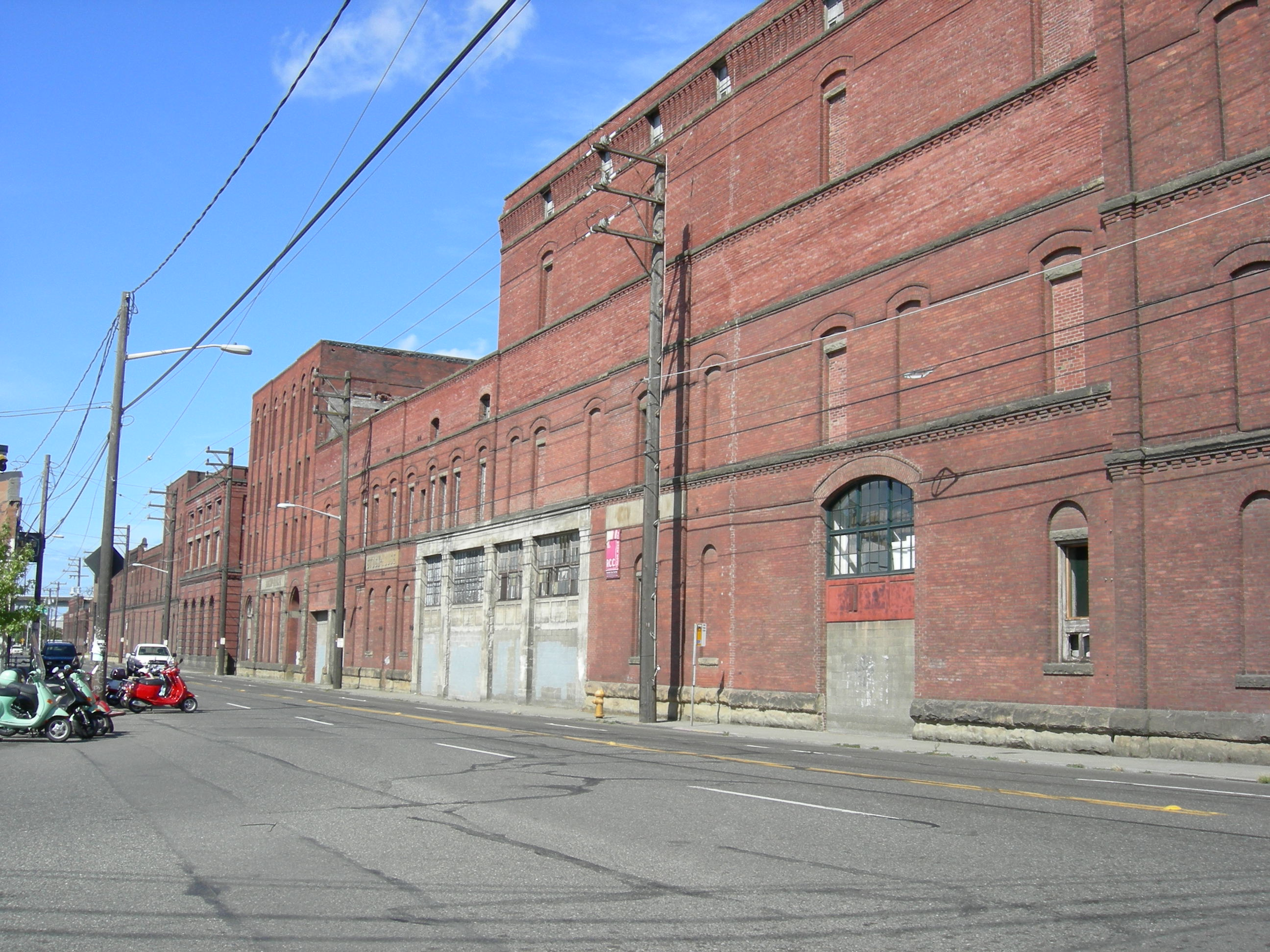
The old (pre-Prohibition) Rainier brewery in Georgetown

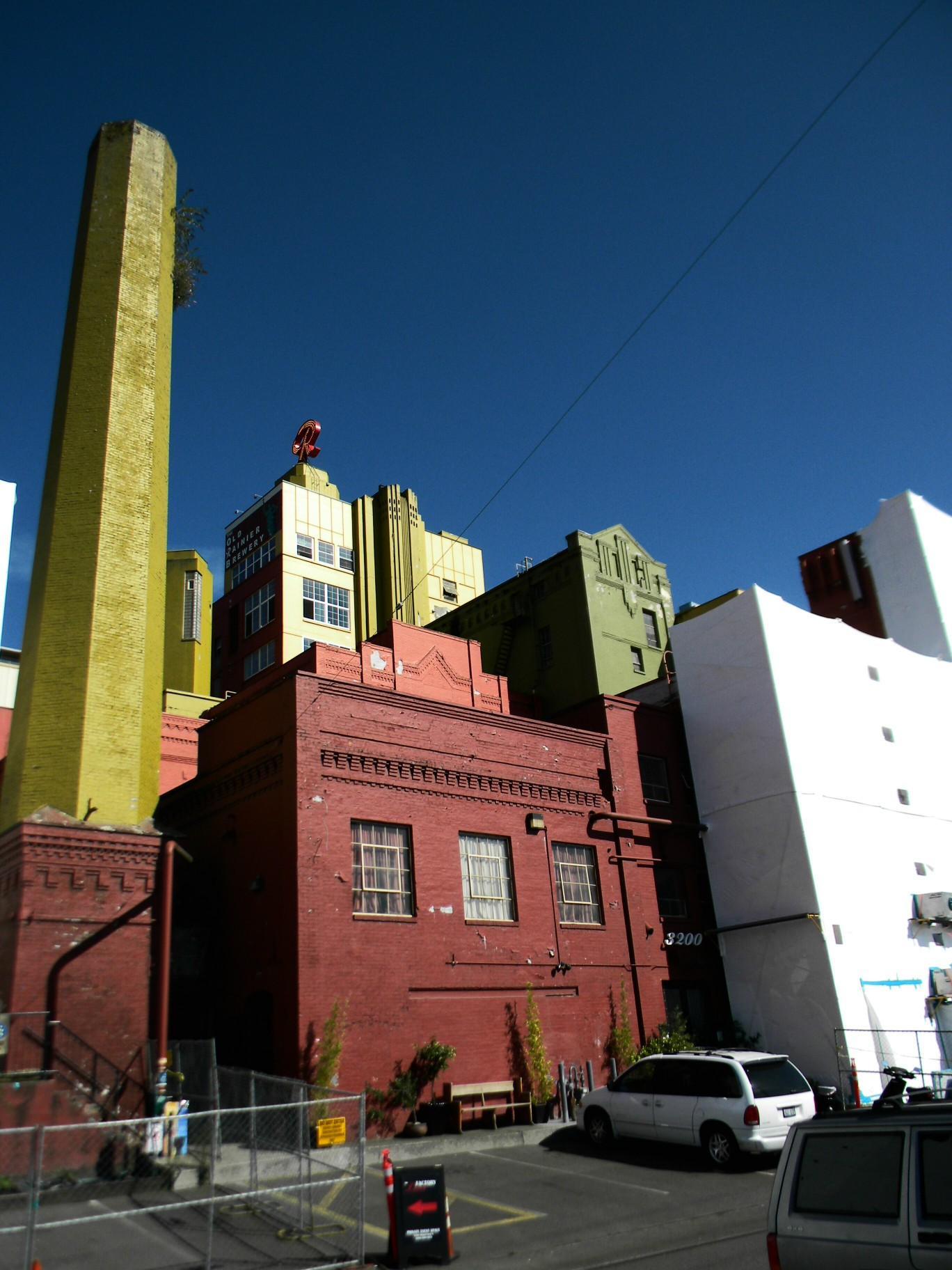
The "Bayview" Rainier brewery in Sodo, active until 1999

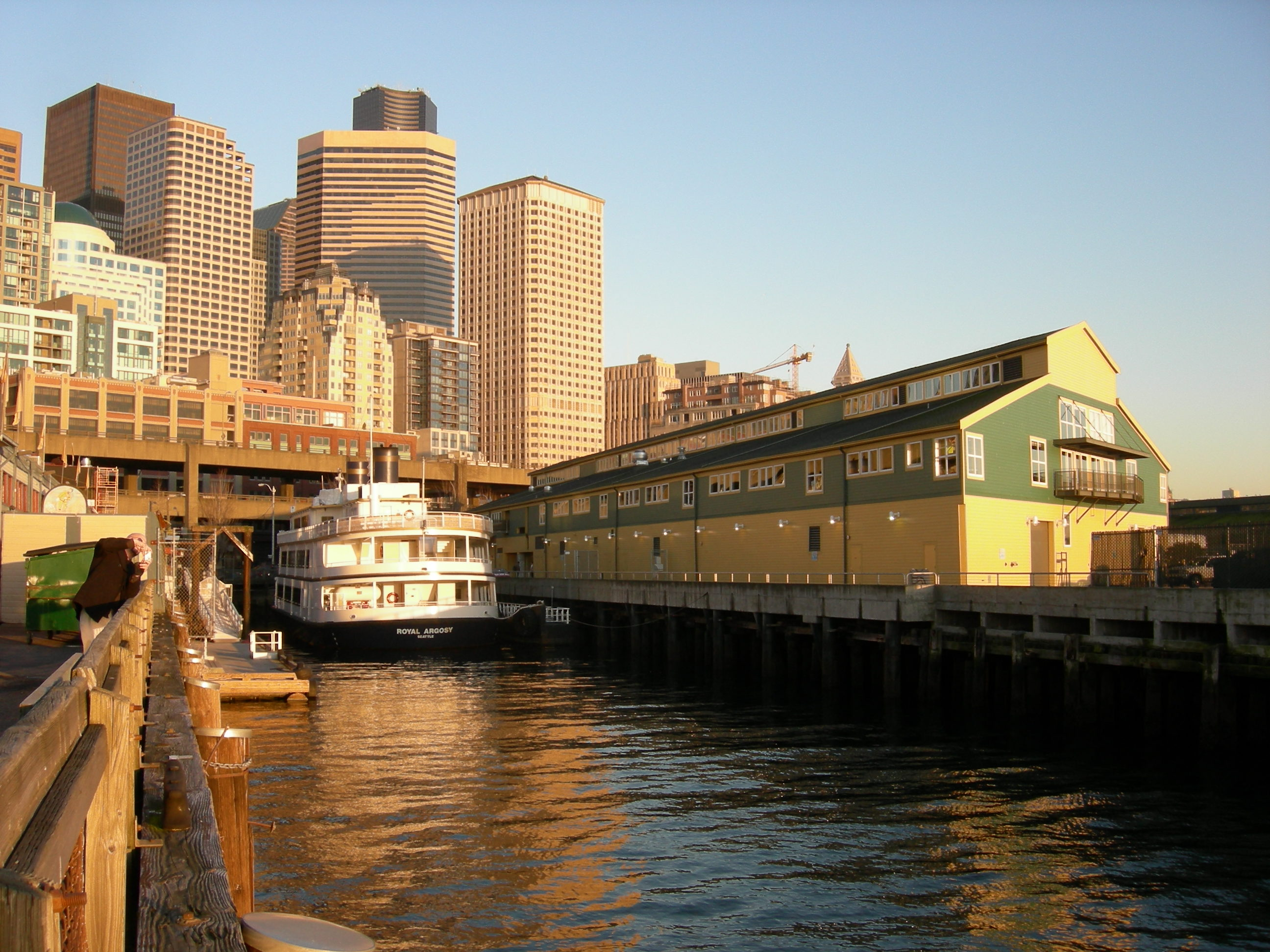
Although renovated and repurposed, the Central Waterfront piers and pier sheds, such as Pier 56 (shown here), have retained the same structure since the days of the Klondike Gold Rush.

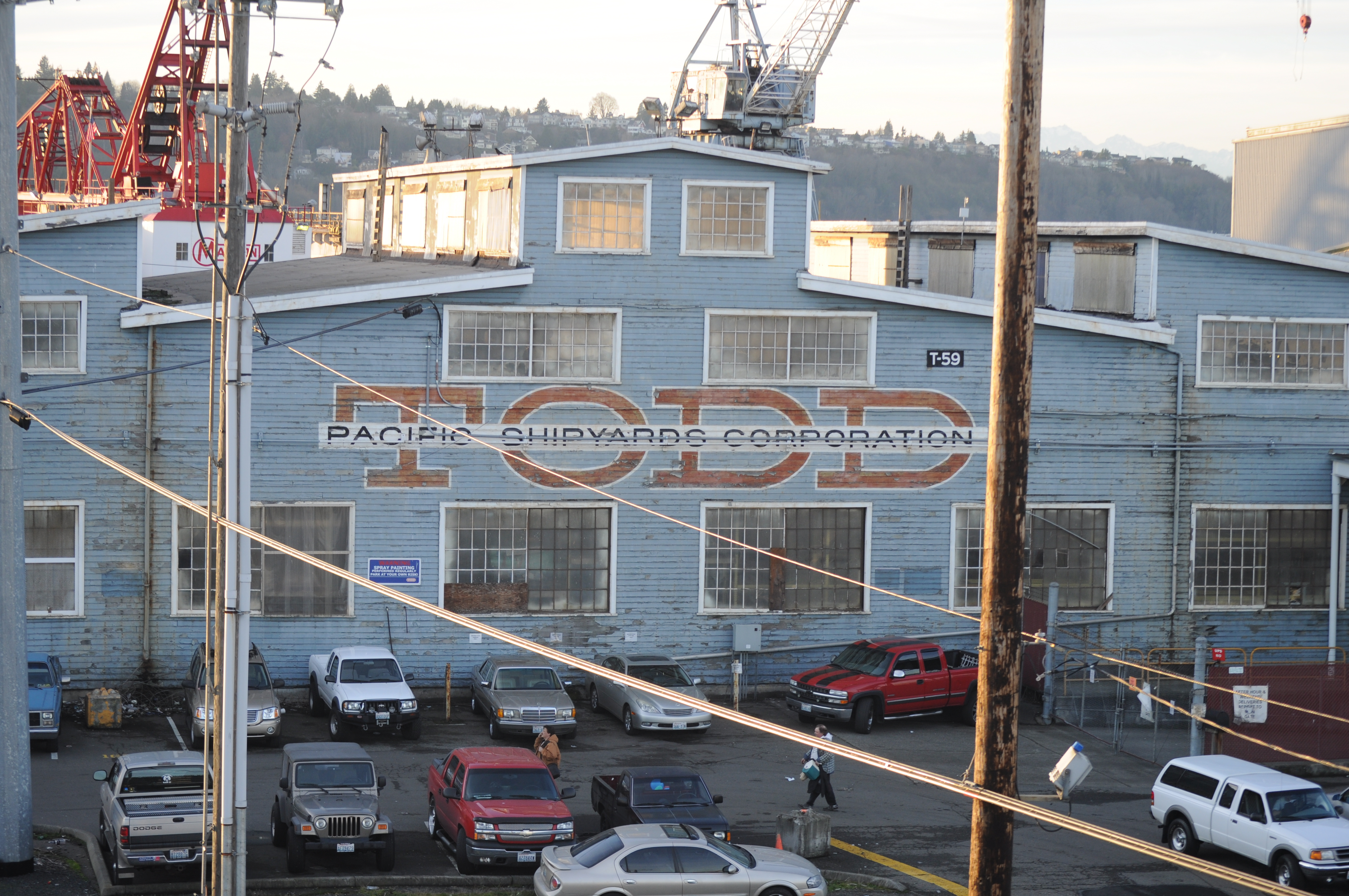
Todd Shipyard on Harbor Island

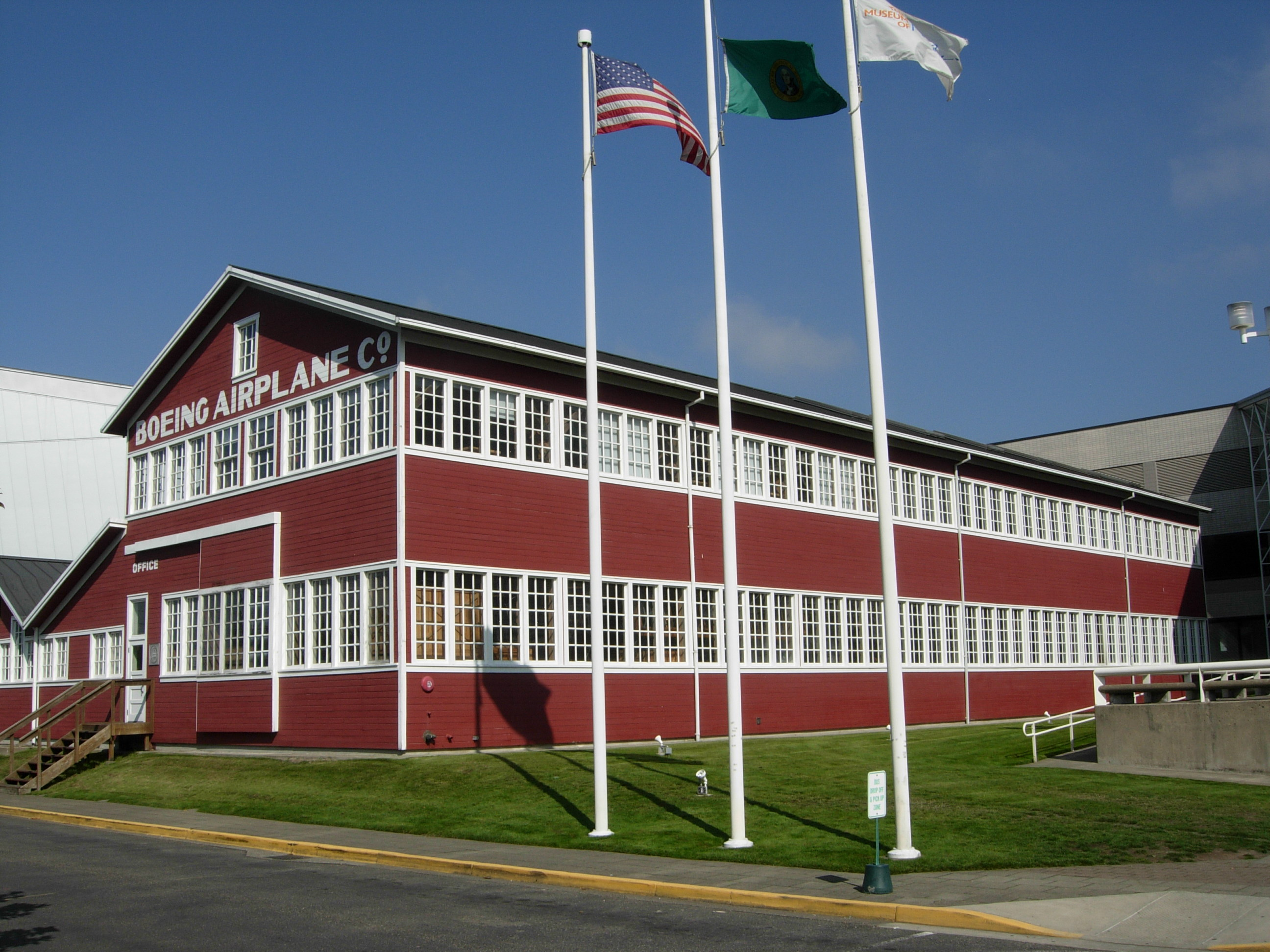
Boeing Building No. 105, "The Red Barn," now moved from its original location at the former Boeing Plant 1 on the left bank of the Duwamish to the Museum of Flight on the other side of the river

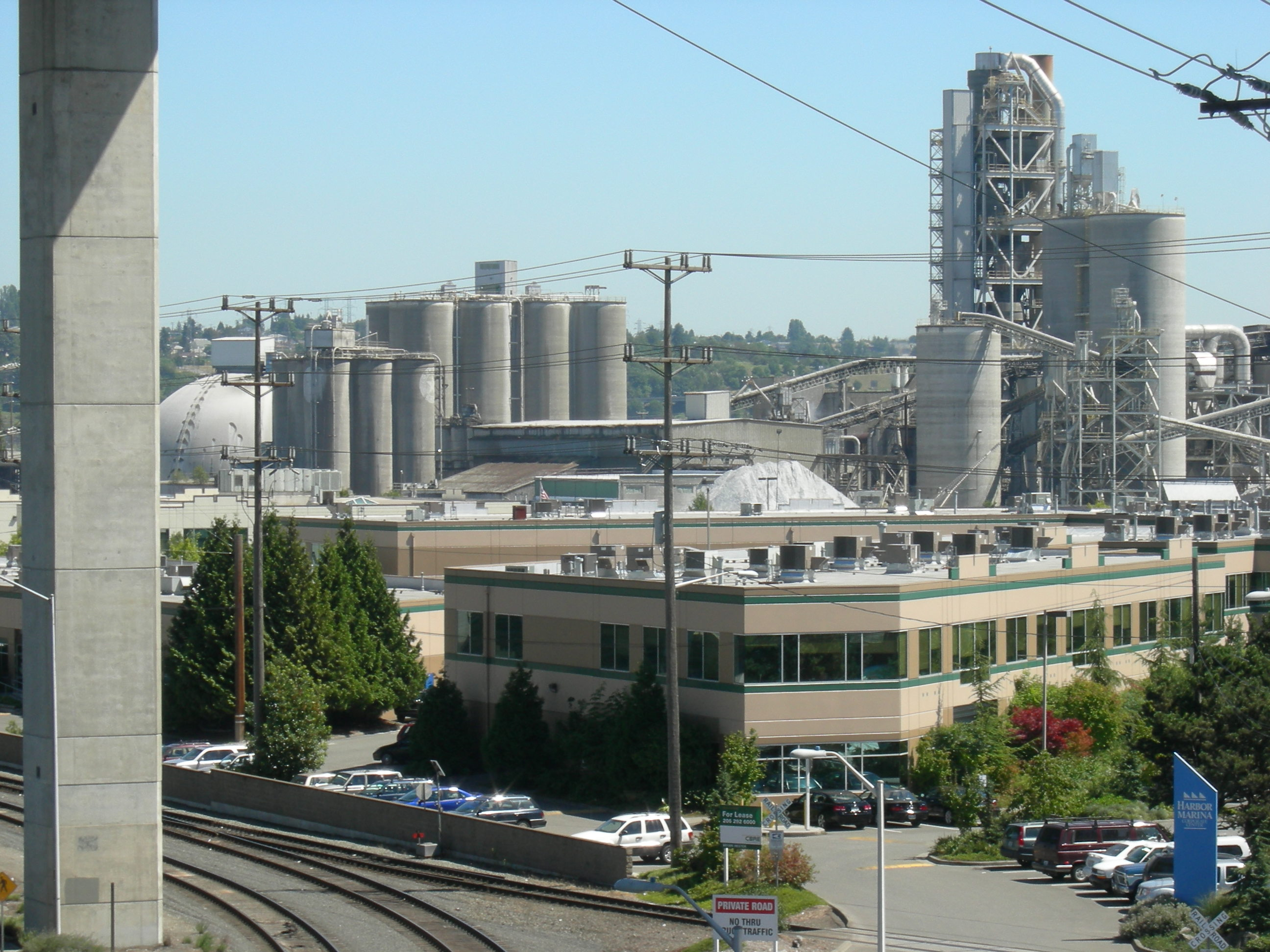
Ash Grove Cement Company on the right bank of the Duwamish

=== Power and water infrastructure ===
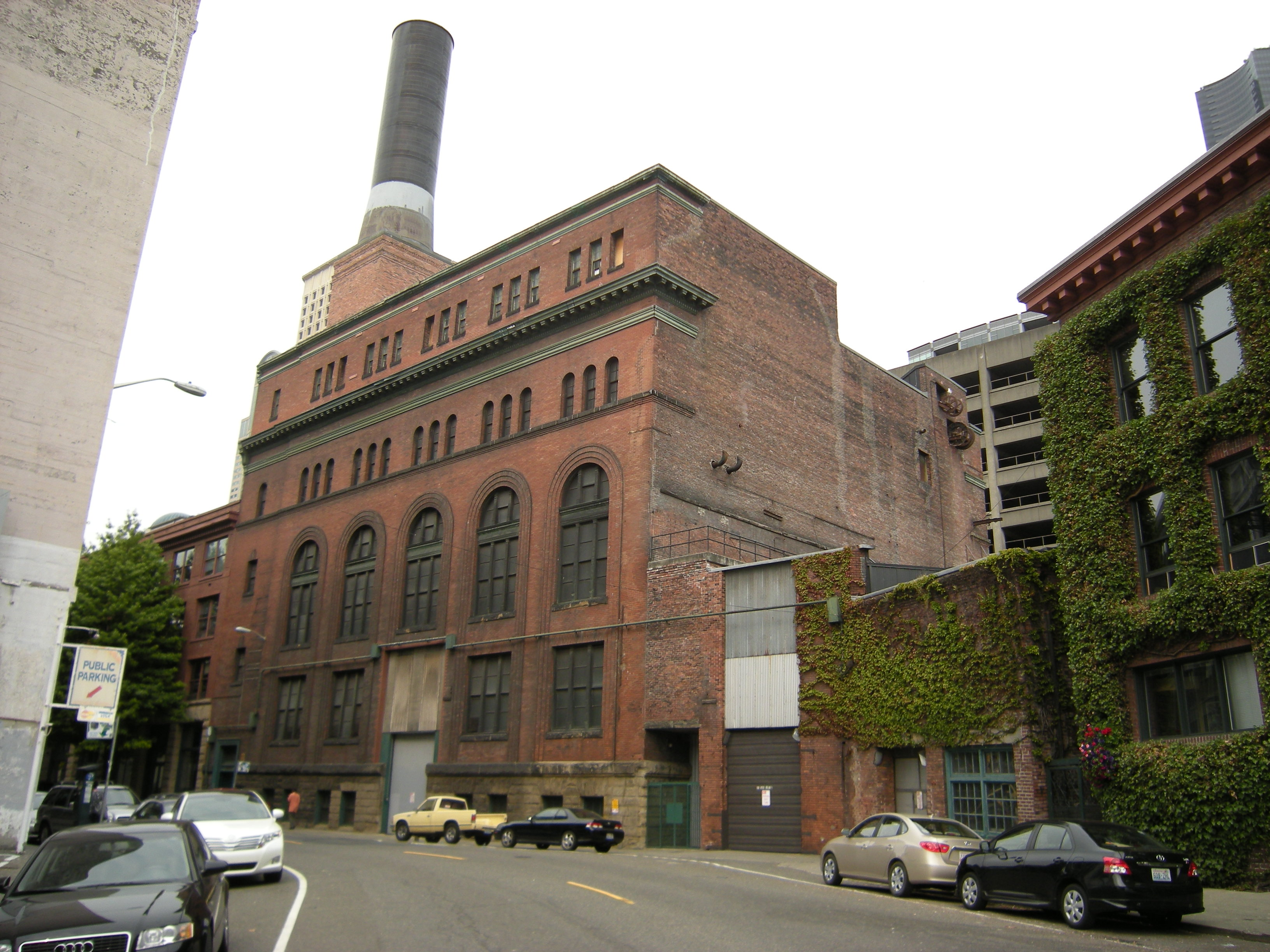
Post Station in the Pioneer Square neighborhood, steam plant built by Stone and Webster, now owned by Seattle Steam Company. The lower Old Post Station at right was built circa 1890; the tall portion, New Post Station, in 1902.

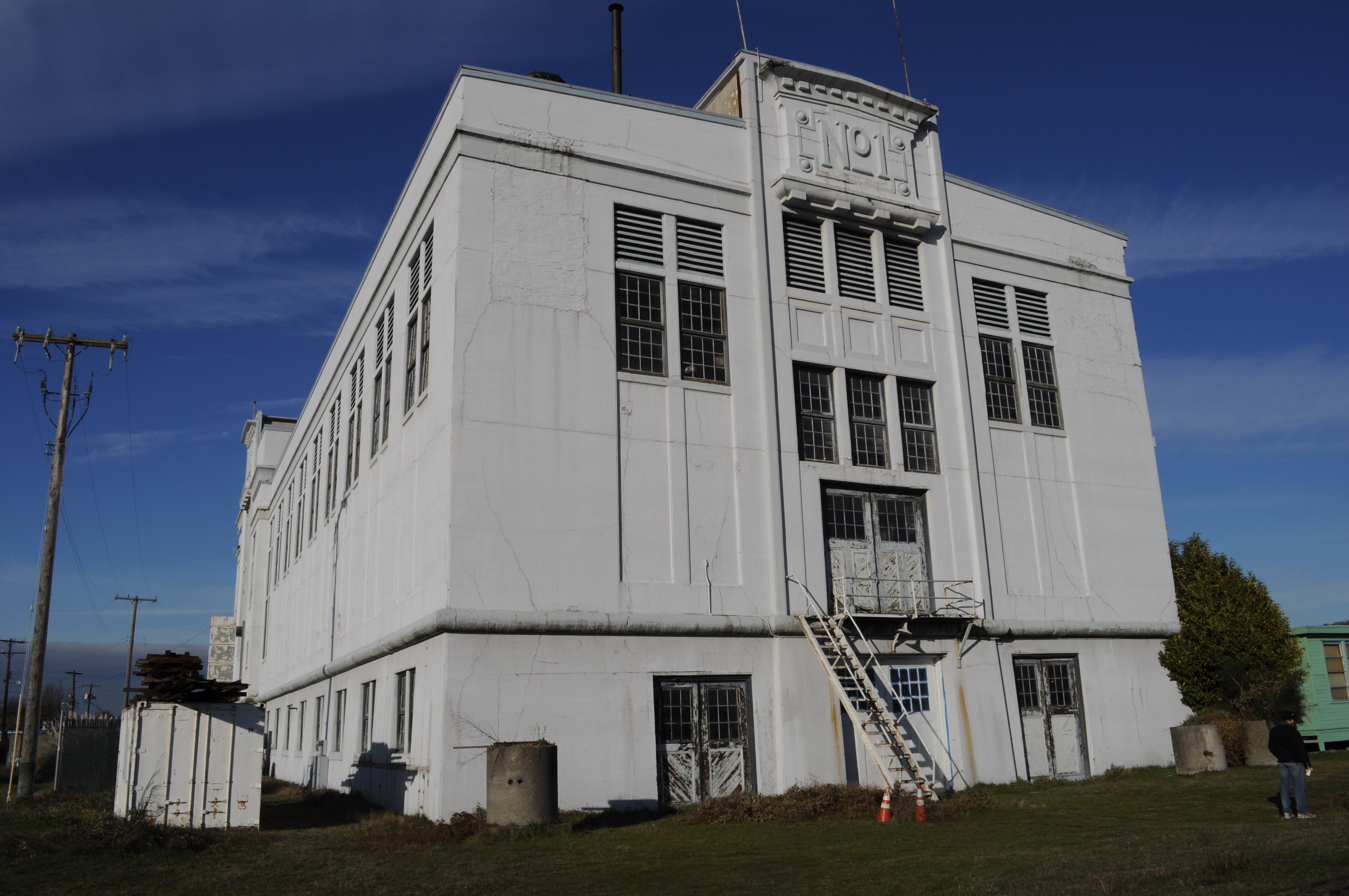
The Georgetown Steam Plant, now Georgetown PowerPlant Museum, built by Stone and Webster in 1906. One of the first reinforced concrete structures on the U.S. West Coast, it provided electricity for rail and residential use.

== Asian influences ==
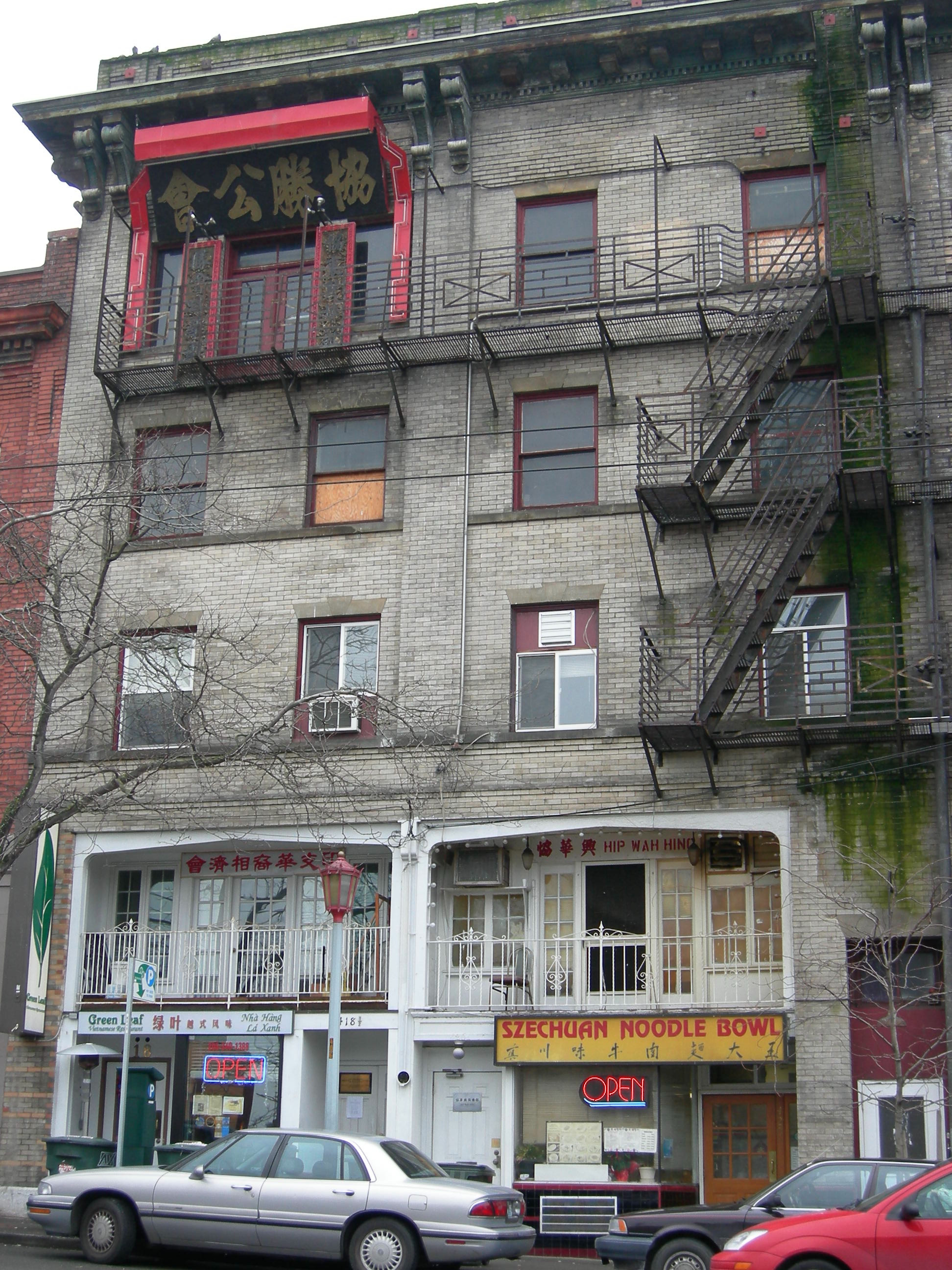
Just north of S. King Street on 8th Avenue is one of several early 20th-century buildings in the Chinatown - International District grafting Chinese decoration onto Western architecture.

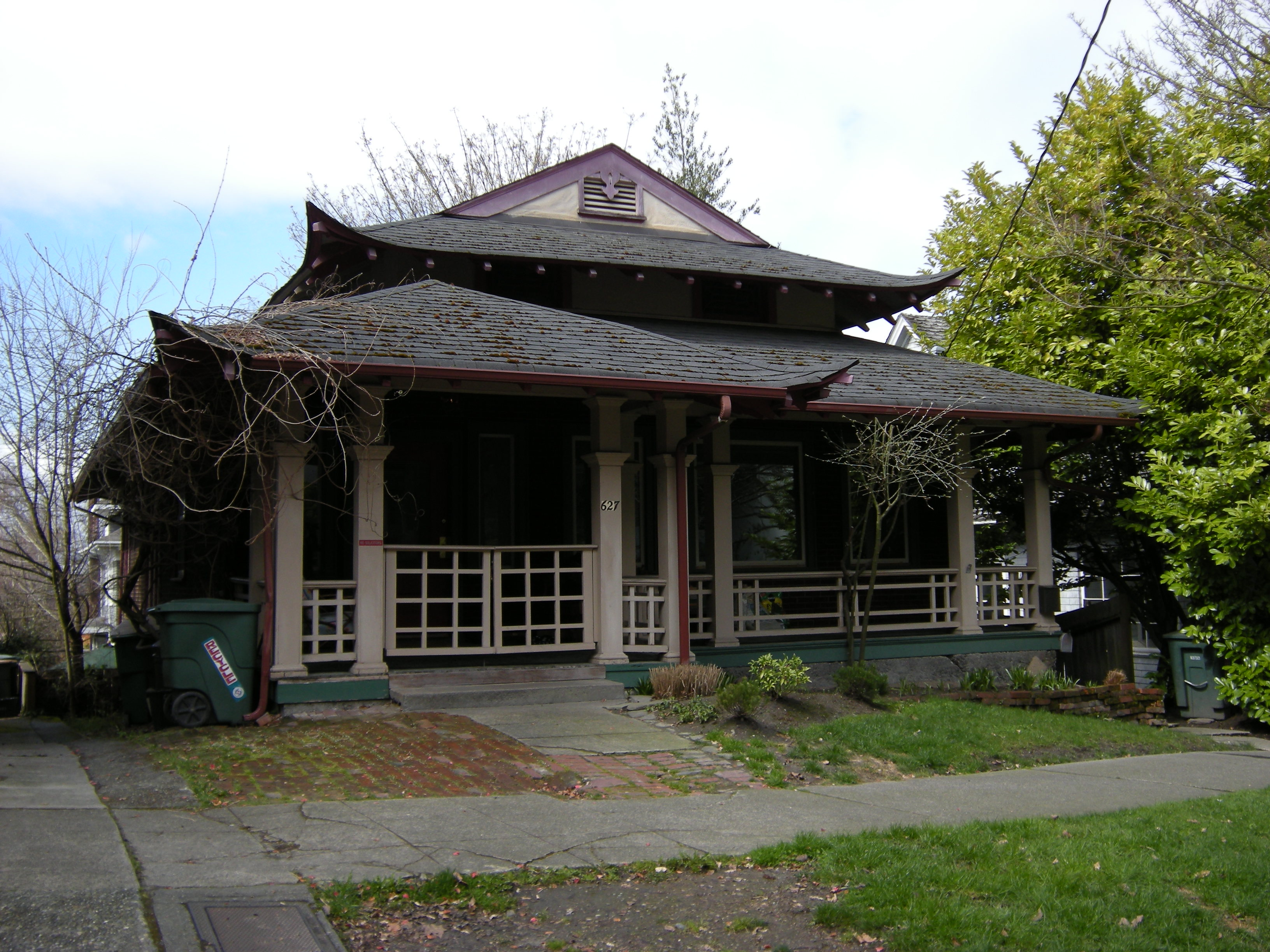
Asian influence can be seen in the roofline of this Craftsman bungalow at 627 13th E. on Capitol Hill.

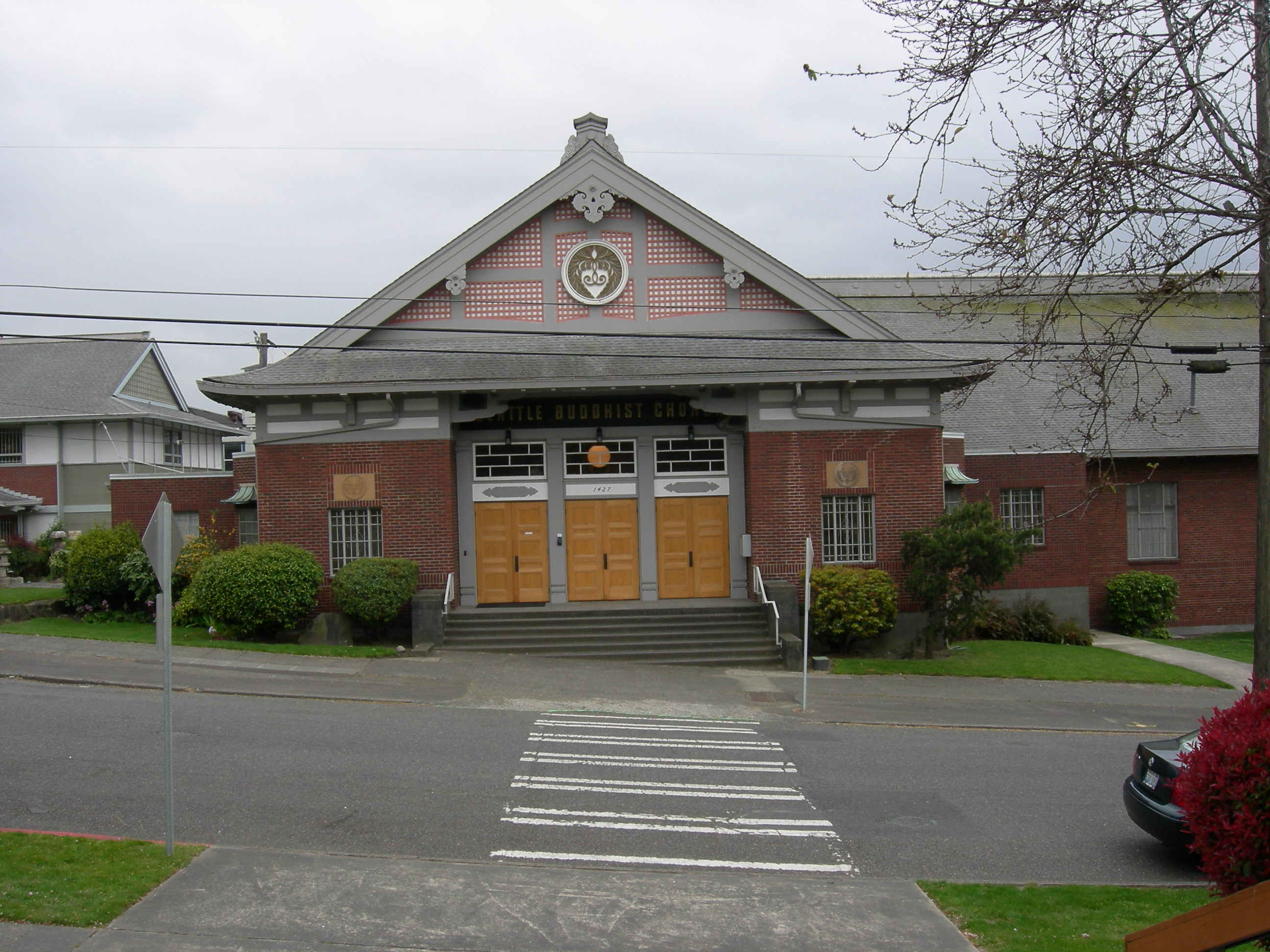
The Seattle Buddhist Church, a Jodo Shinshu Buddhist temple, built 1940–1941, designed by Japanese American Kichio Allen Arai, although the architect of record was Pierce A. Horrocks, because Arai lacked an architectural license

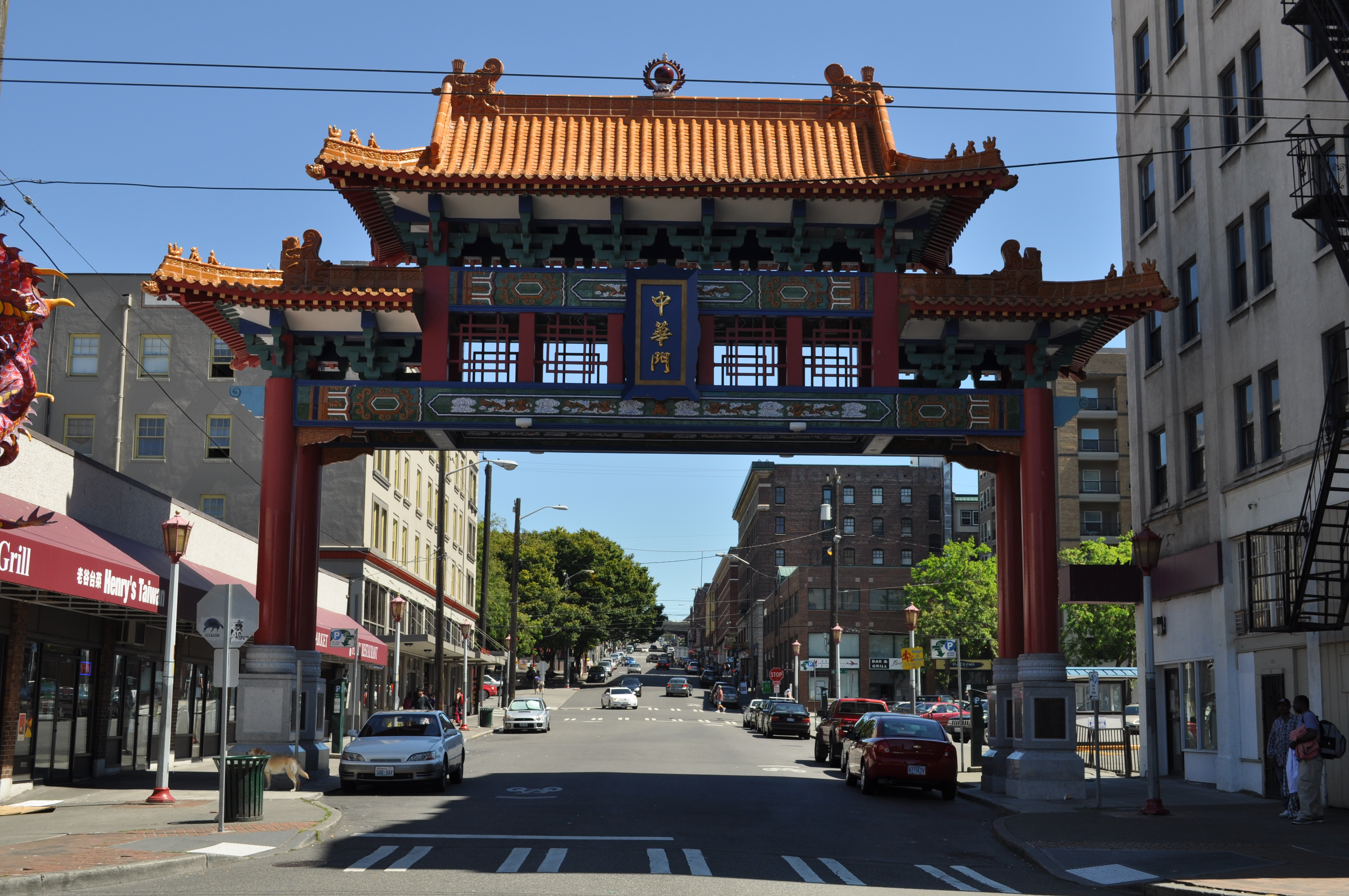
The Historic Chinatown Gate, a modern Paifang archway built in 2007

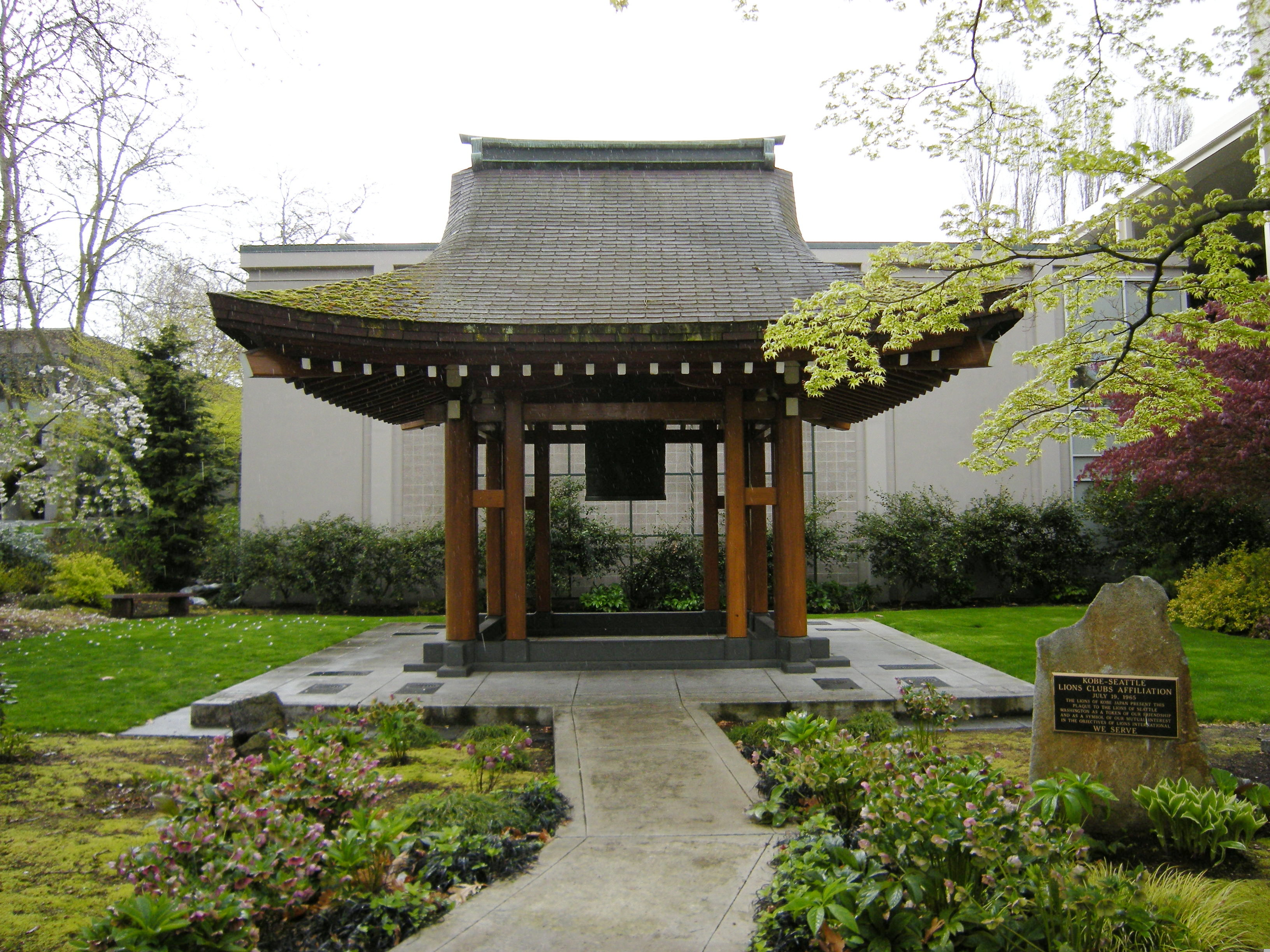
Kobe Bell on the grounds of Seattle Center, a designated city landmark

== Scandinavian influences ==
Despite a large historic Scandinavian presence in Seattle, especially in Ballard, there is a relative lack of obvious Scandinavian architectural influence in the city. Nearby Poulsbo is nicknamed "Little Norway" for the blatant Scandinavian influence in its downtown; Seattle has almost nothing of the sort.

The sandstone First Covenant Church on Pike and Bellevue in Downtown Seattle, formerly named the Swedish Tabernacle, is an example of Scandinavian-influenced churchbuilding.

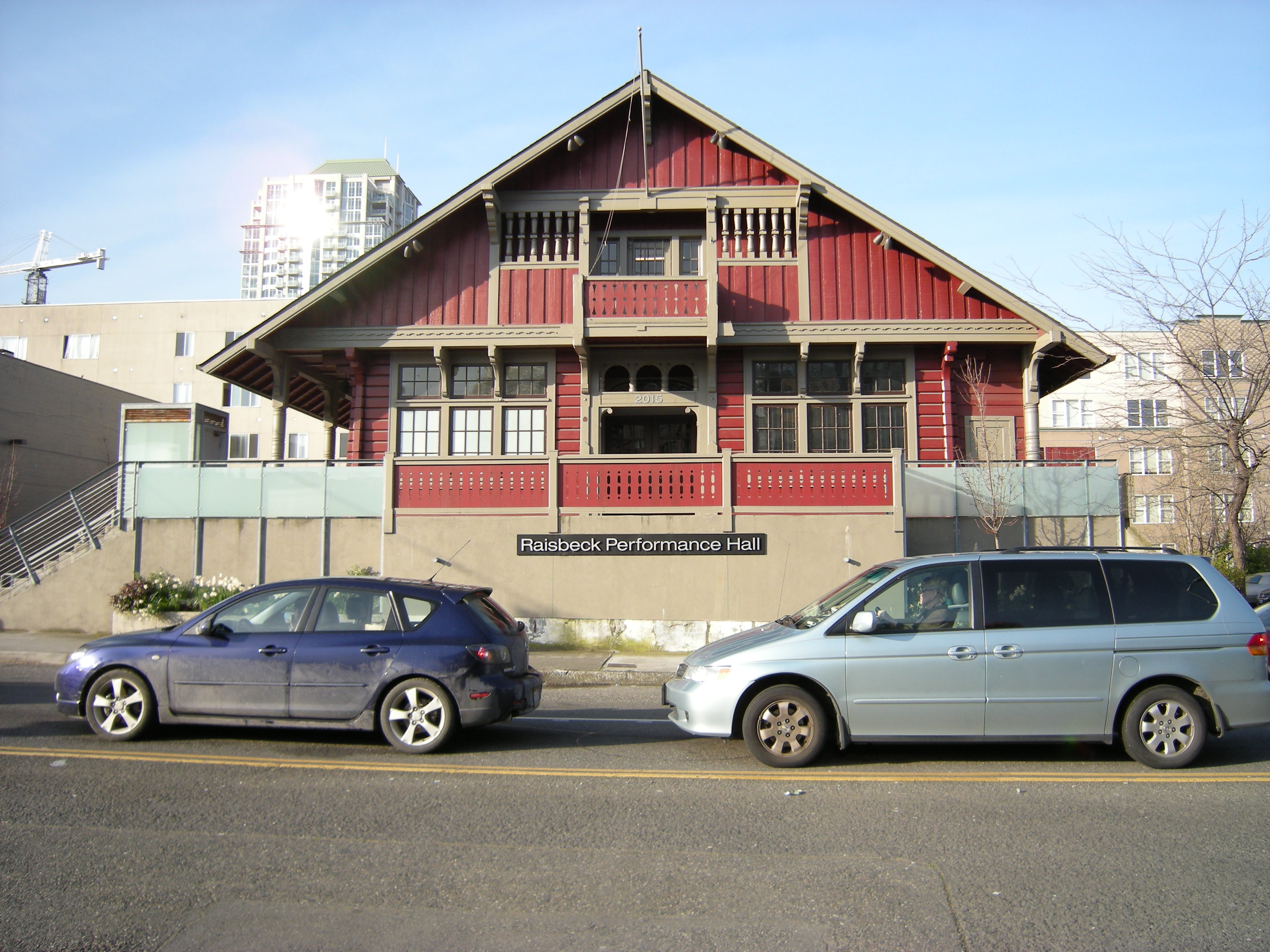
The former Norway Hall, 2015 Boren Avenue, designed by Sonke Englehart Sonnichsen and built in 1915, now Raisbeck Performance Hall, Cornish College

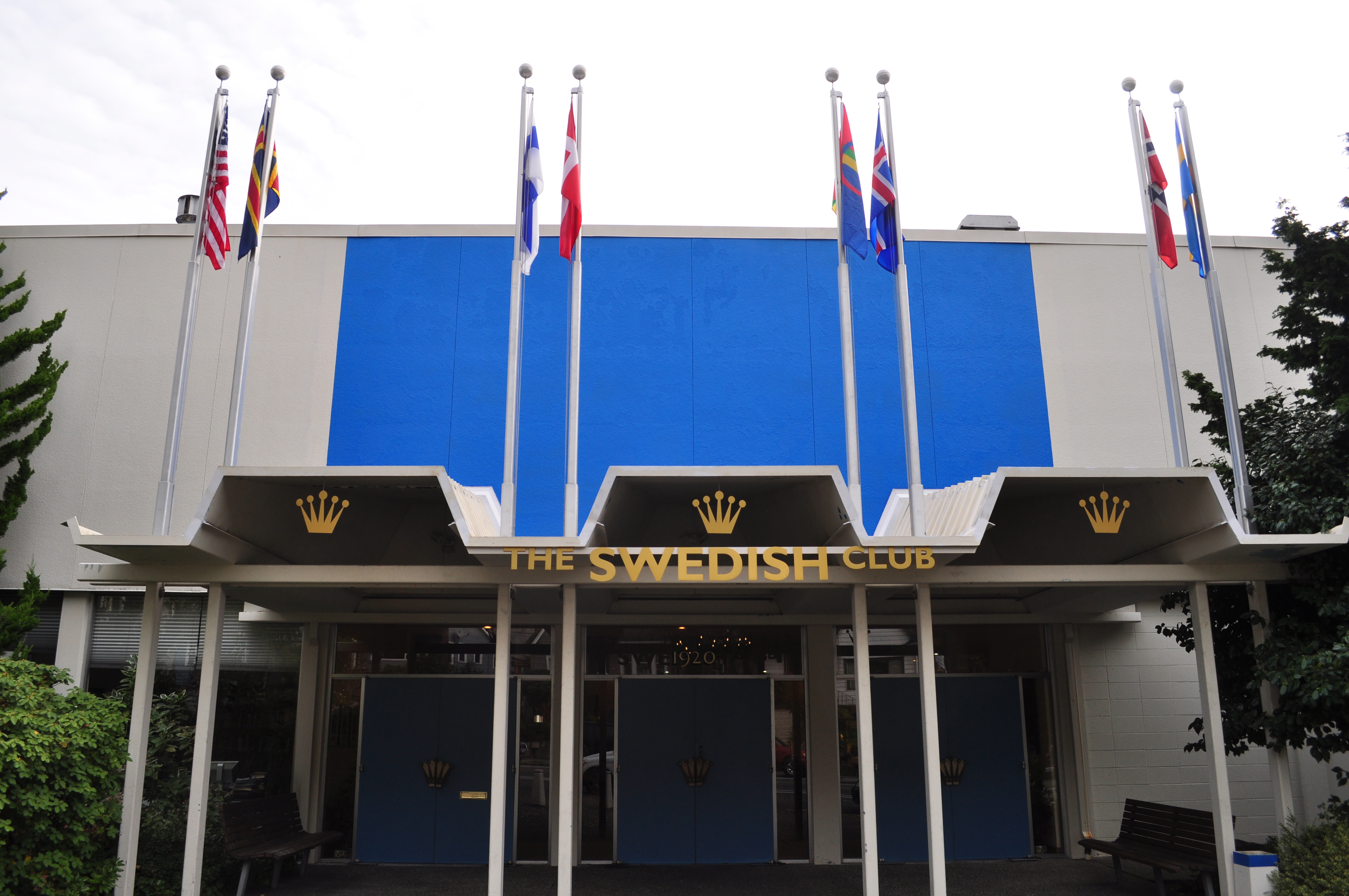
Swedish Club / Swedish Cultural Center, 1920 Dexter Avenue, designed by Einar V. Anderson, Arden Croco Steinhart, and Robert Dennis Theriault Sr., and built 1959–1961. Prior to that they were located in a 1902 building on Eight Avenue by contractors Otto Roseleaf, August S. Peterson, and Otto Rudolf Roseleaf.

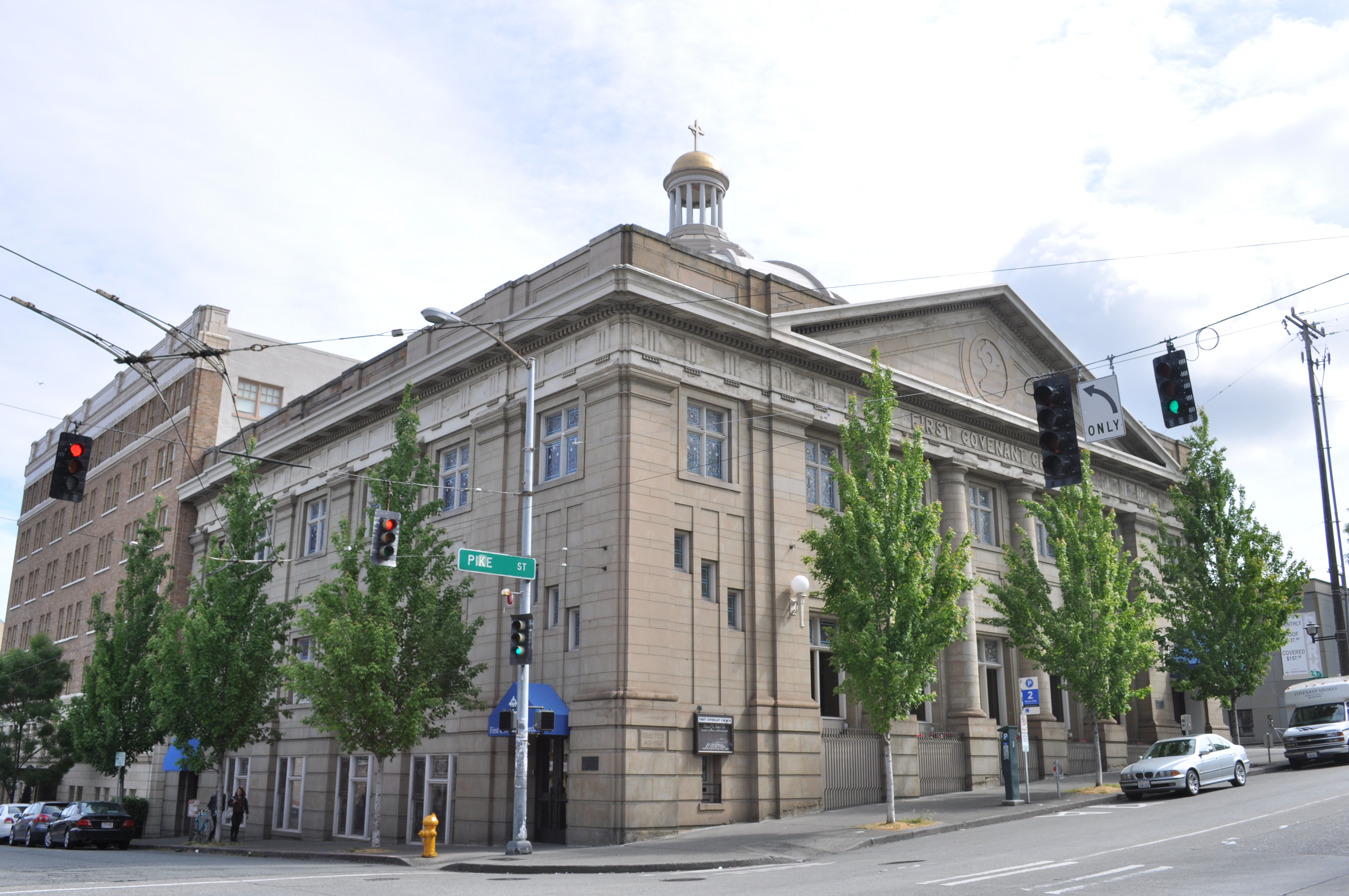
First Covenant Church

== The rise of "green buildings" ==
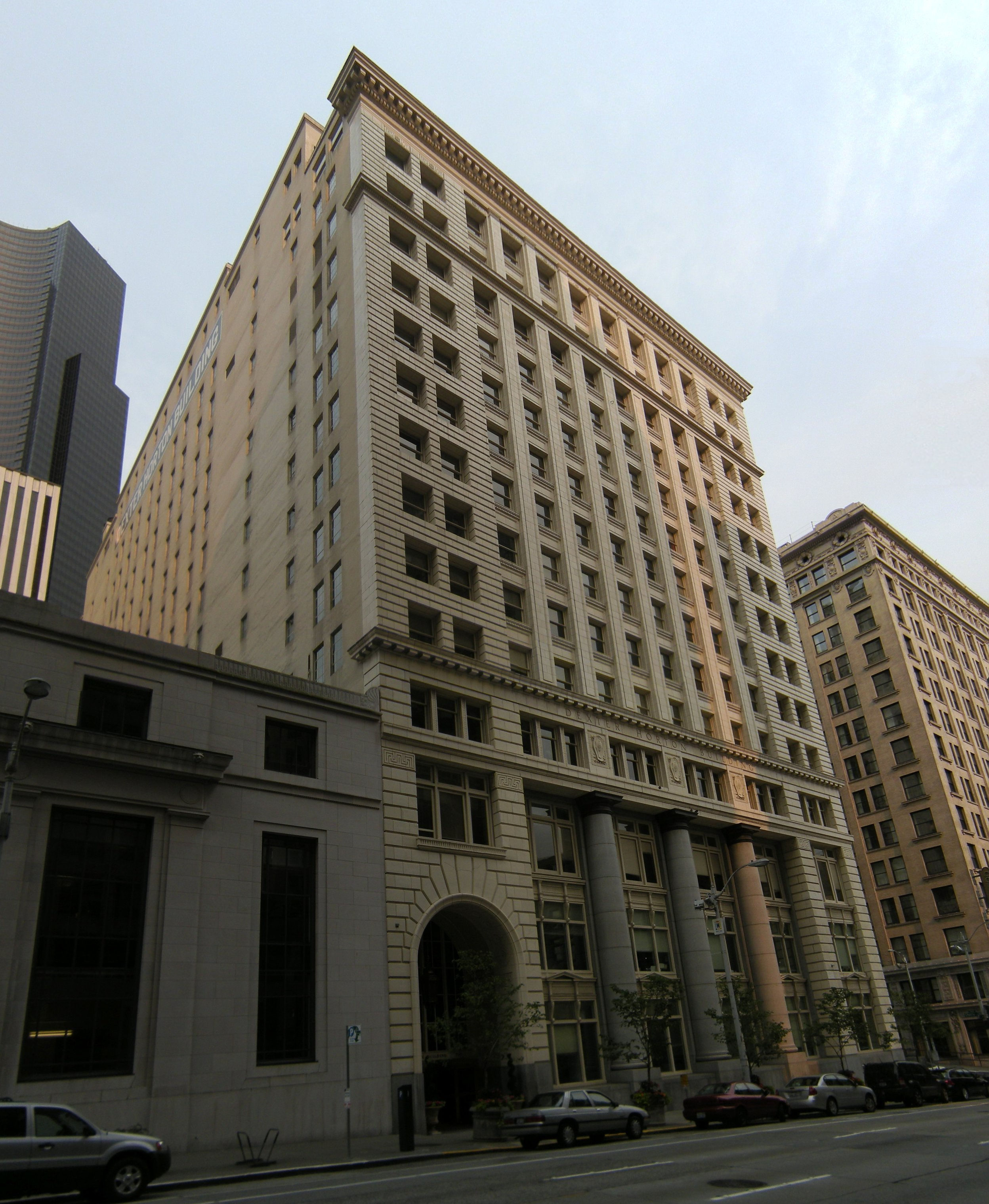
The Dexter Horton Building, built 1924, renovated in 2002 and 2013, received LEED Gold certification in 2015.

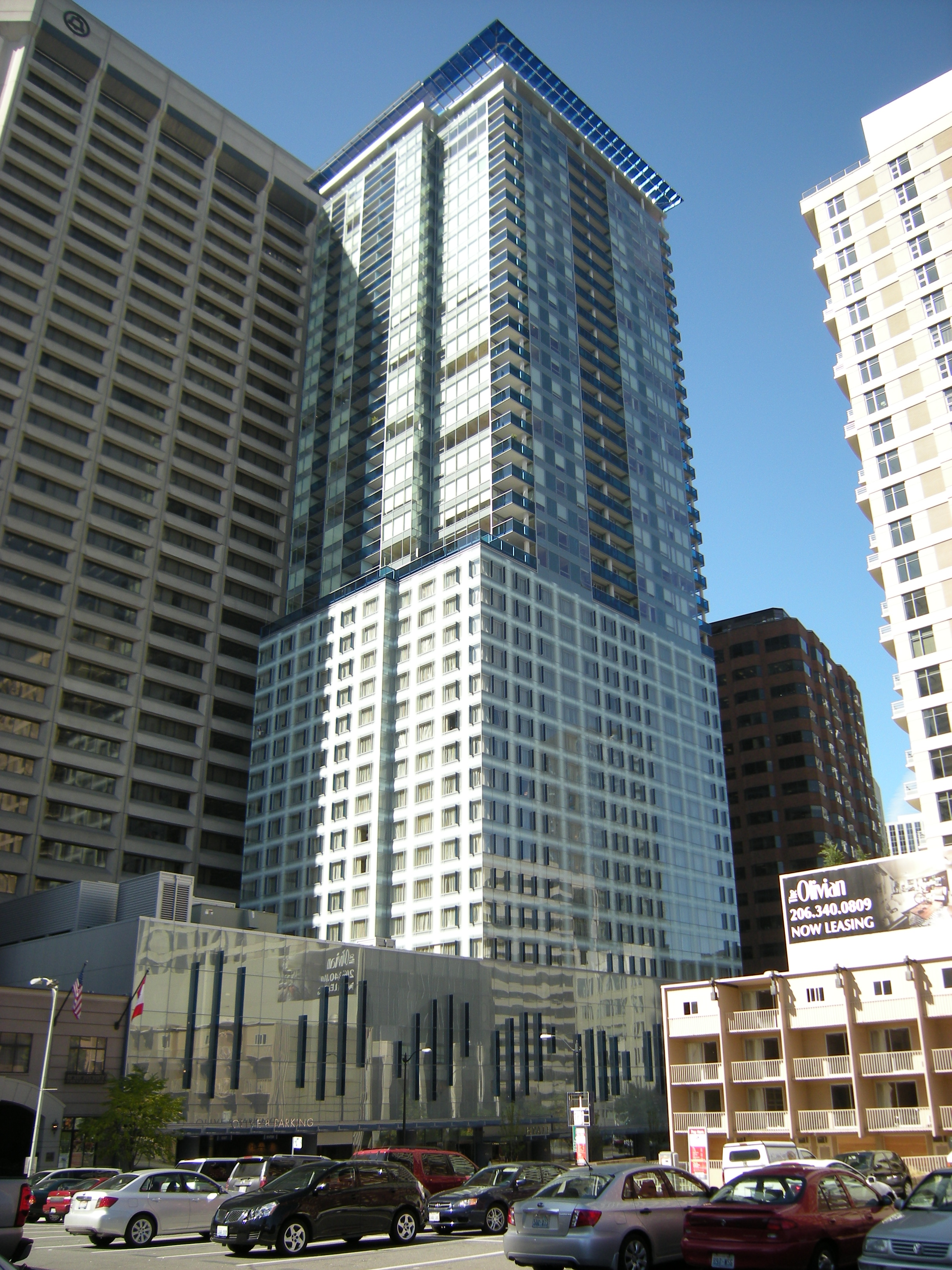
Olive 8, a hotel/condo building designed by Gluckman Mayner Architects and completed in 2009, is a LEED Silver building with a green roof.

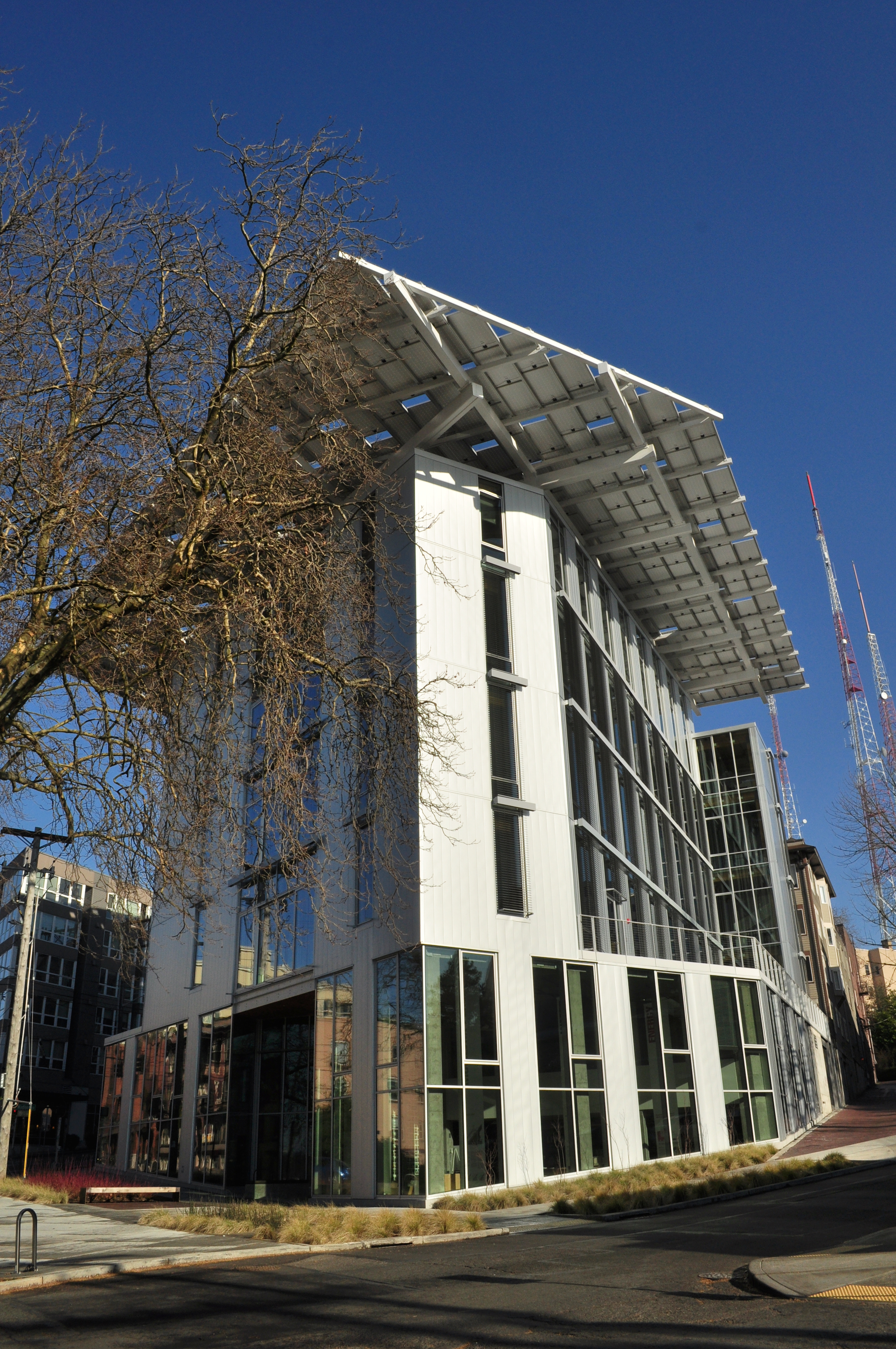
The Bullitt Center, designed by Miller Hull and completed 2013. Certified as a "Living Building".

== See also ==
- Seattle Architecture Foundation
