= List of theatres in Portland, Oregon =

This is a list of theatres in Portland, Oregon, including both currently operating venues and former theatres that are no longer in operation.

== Current ==
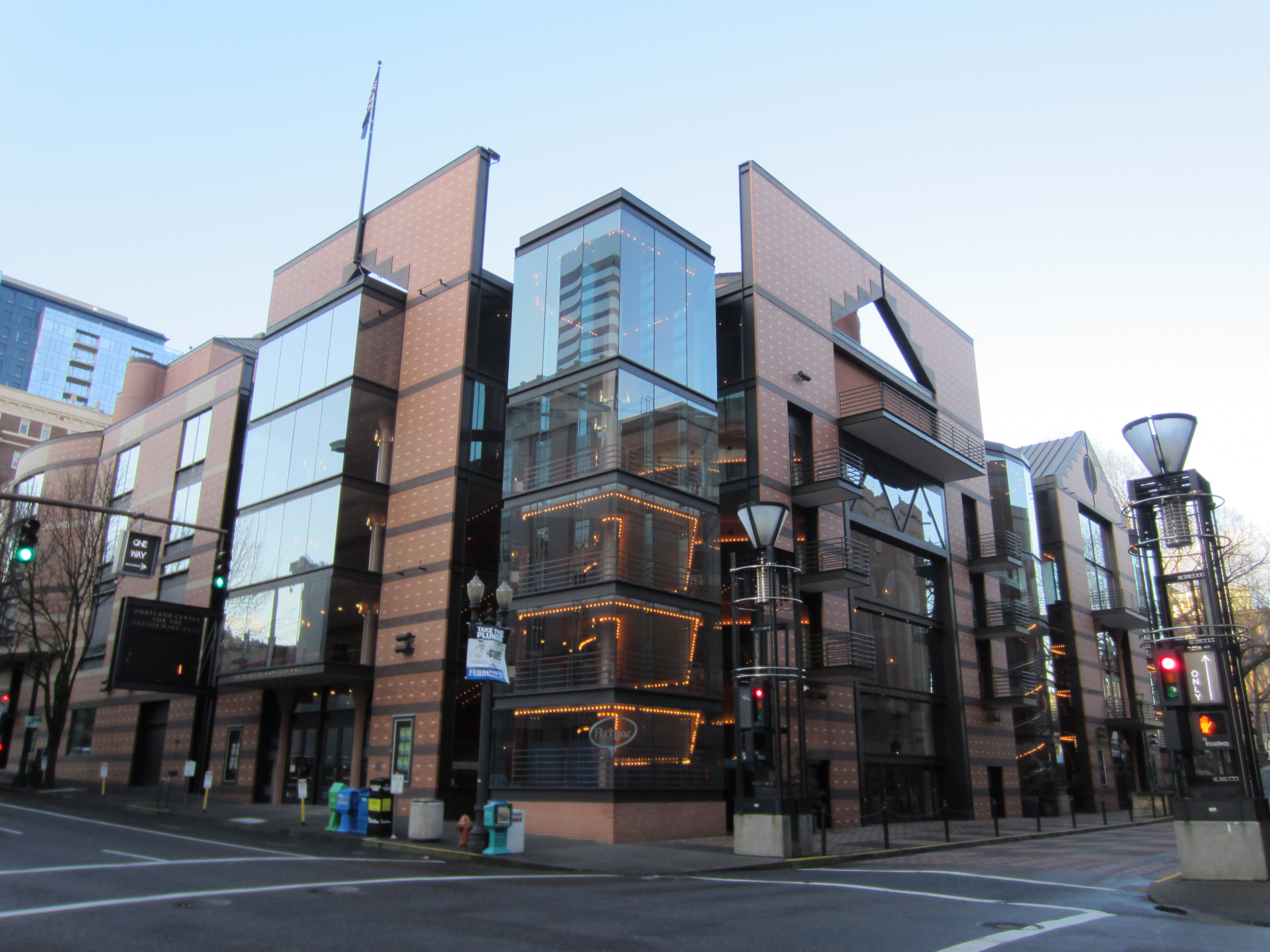
Antoinette Hatfield Hall, 2012

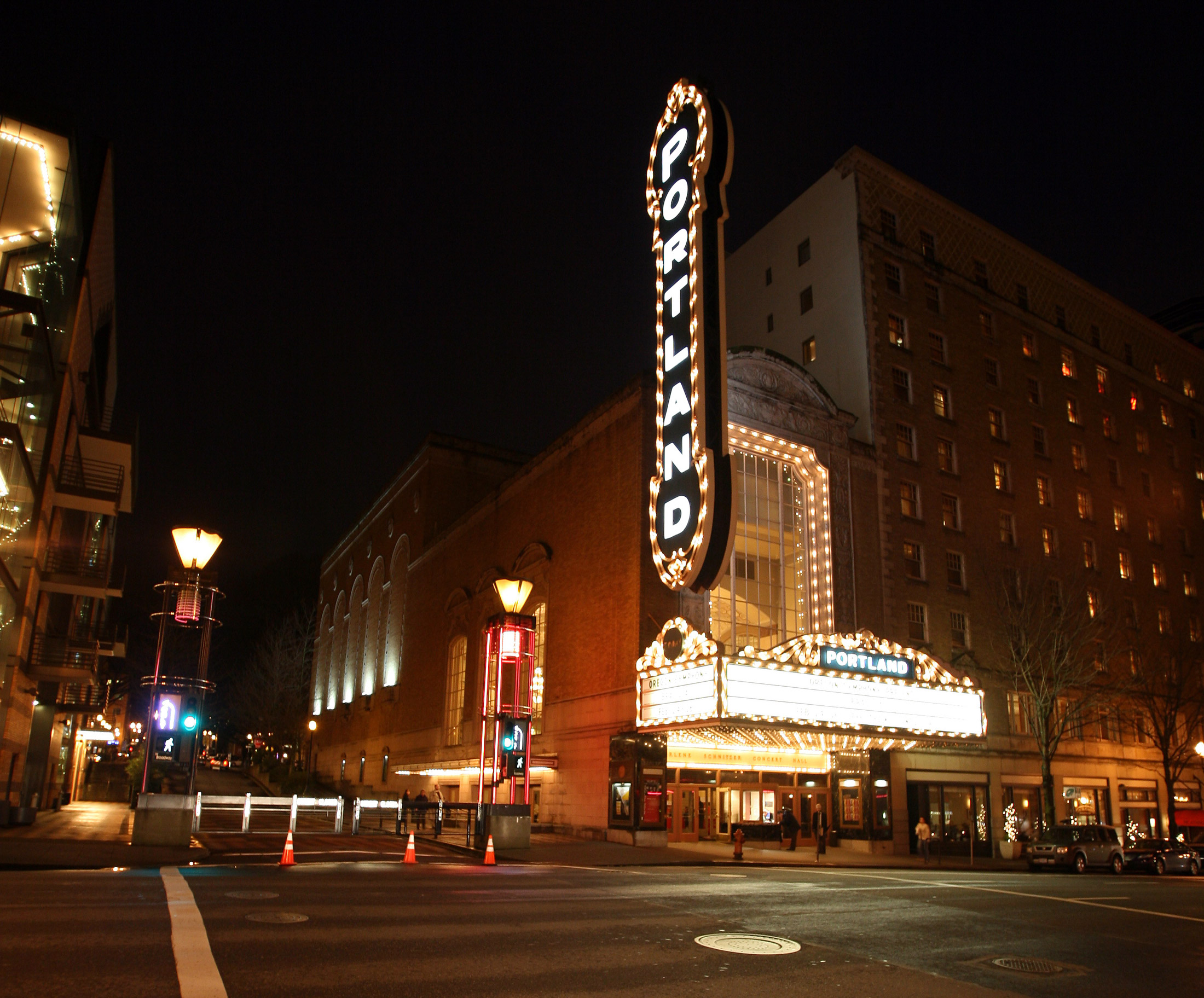
Arlene Schnitzer Concert Hall, 2007

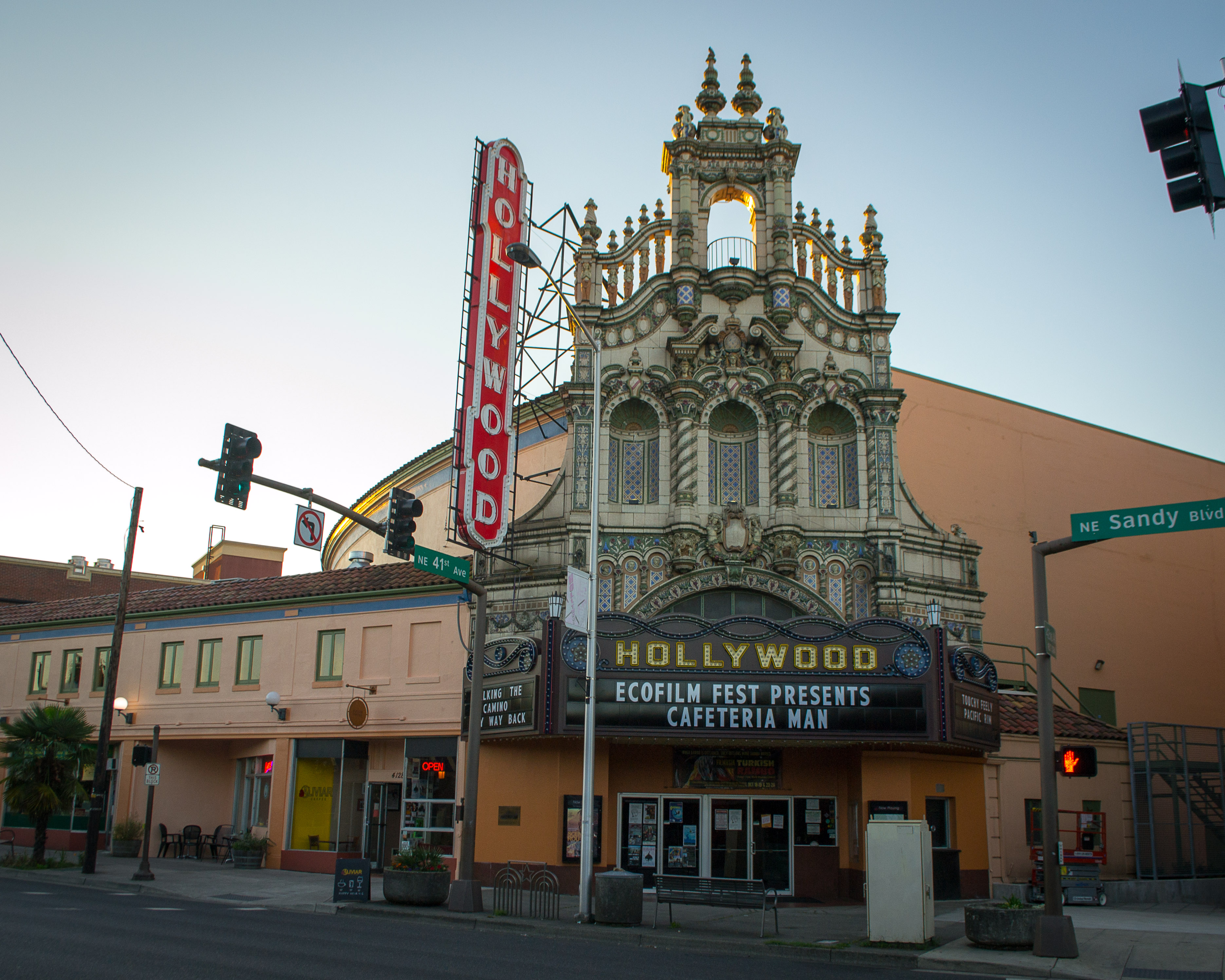
Hollywood Theatre, 2013

- 5th Avenue Cinema
- Academy Theater
- Aladdin Theater
- Alberta Rose Theatre
- Alhambra Theatre
- Antoinette Hatfield Hall
- Arlene Schnitzer Concert Hall
- Artists Repertory Theatre
- Avalon Theatre
- Bagdad Theatre
- Cinema 21
- Cinemagic Theater
- Clinton Street Theater
- First Regiment Armory Annex
- Foster Theater
- Hawthorne Theatre
- Hollywood Theatre
- Kennedy School
- Laurelhurst Theater
- Mission Theater and Pub
- Moreland Theater
- National Cash Register Building
- Paris Theatre
- Portland's Centers for the Arts
- Roseland Theater
- Roseway Theater
- St. Johns Twin Cinema
- Star Theater
- Tomorrow Theater

== Former ==
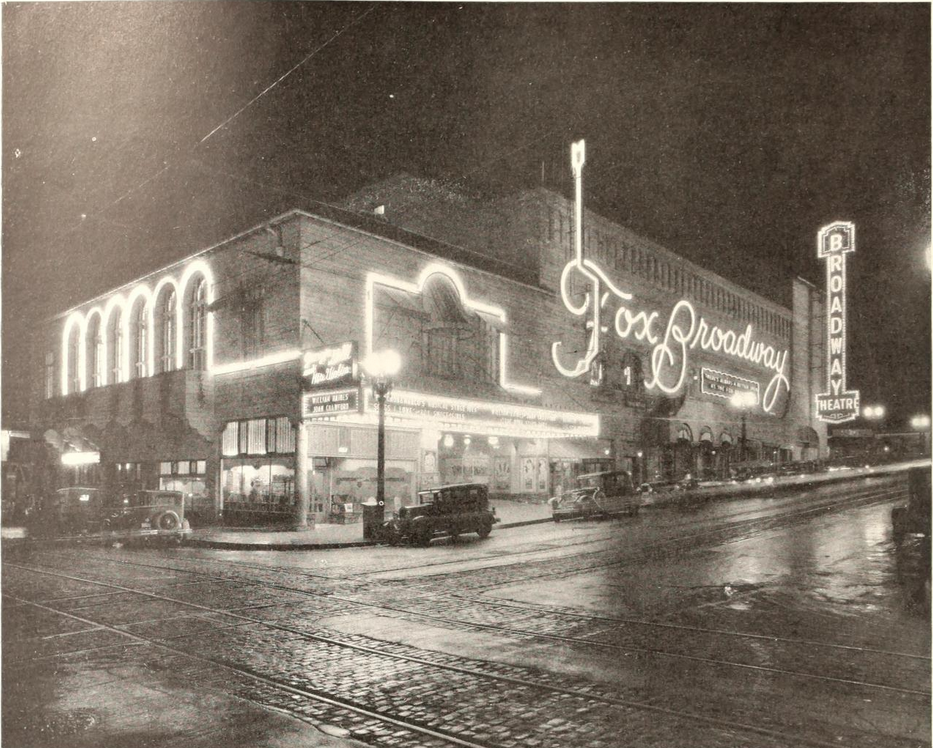
Broadway Theatre, 1929

- Broadway Theatre
- Fox Theatre
- Guild Theatre
- Oriental Theatre
- Playhouse Theatre
- United Artists Theatre

== See also ==
- Imago Theatre (Portland, Oregon)
