= Cinemas in Portland, Oregon =

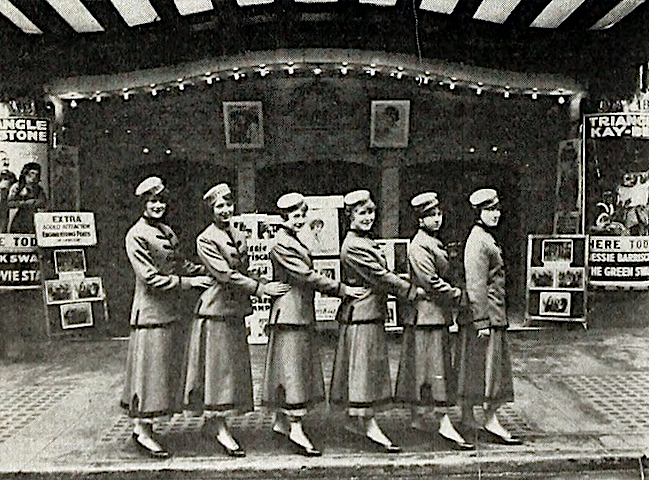
Usherettes at the Columbia Theater in Portland, 1916

At the advent of the 20th century, the city of Portland, Oregon, was among the first on the United States West Coast to embrace the advent of the silent and feature film. The city's first movie palace, the Majestic Theatre (later known as the United Artists Theatre), opened in 1911. By 1916, Portland had "the finest array" of movie houses on the West Coast relative to its population, pioneering venues dedicated exclusively to screening films. The popularization of the sound film in the early 1920s resulted in another boom of new cinemas being constructed, including the Laurelhurst, the Hollywood Theatre, and the Bagdad Theatre, the latter of which was financed by Universal Pictures in 1926.

By the mid-20th century, several of the cinemas and movie palaces in Portland were demolished, including the Majestic, the Playhouse Theatre, and the Oriental Theatre. The Portland Publix Theater (later known as the Paramount), is the only cinema in downtown Portland that has survived into the 21st century, having served as the Arlene Schnitzer Concert Hall since 1984.

Since the 1990s, construction of several multiplexes has taken place in the city, mainly by Regal Entertainment Group, who opened multiplex cinemas in the Fox Tower and Pioneer Place in 2000 and 2006, respectively. Several cinemas have also seen extensive renovation since the 1990s, including the Bagdad Theatre by the Portland-based restaurant and hotel company McMenamins, who have opened additional cinemas at their Kennedy School and National Cash Register Building properties. Many of Portland's historic cinemas have continued operations into the 21st century screening both revival and art house films, including the nonprofit Hollywood Theatre, Cinema 21, and the Fifth Avenue Cinema, the latter of which is owned by Portland State University and operated by the university film department. In 2013, the real estate company Movoto ranked Portland the no. 1 city in the United States for movie lovers.

== History ==
=== 1910–1919: Beginnings and silent era ===
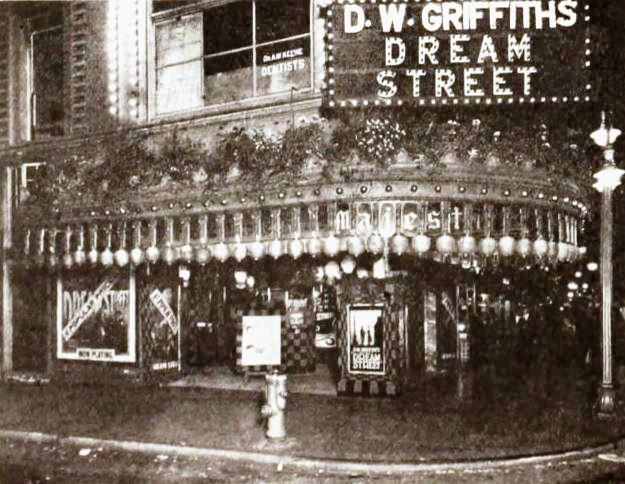
The Majestic Theatre, the first movie palace built in Portland, in 1921, showing Dream Street

In the early 20th century following the advent of film, Portland, Oregon was one of few western U.S. cities to embrace the exhibition of films. Historians Gary Lacher and Steve Stone partially attribute this to the region's predominant rainy weather, which resulted in residents seeking indoor forms of entertainment.

Though the Star Theater was showing Synchroscope films as early as 1908, the first exclusive movie palace in Portland was the Majestic Theatre located at the northeast corner of Southwest Park Avenue and Washington Street, which opened on June 10, 1911. The venue contained 1,100 seats, and was constructed for $62,500 by Edwin F. James, a businessman from Seattle. It was the first movie palace in Portland to show a silent feature film — the two-reel Italian feature The Fall of Troy — in 1911. The same year, the Majestic introduced a pipe organ to accompany film screenings; the Star Theater also introduced an organ. The Baker Theatre, which had hosted live theater by the Baker Players, began showing films shortly after (the cinema would become known as the Playhouse Theatre in later decades).

The following year, in 1912, the Sunnyside Theatre (contemporarily known as the Avalon Theatre) was opened, followed by the Alhambra and Columbia Theater in 1913. At the time of its opening, the Columbia, built for $125,000, was marketed as being "without peer" as the city's "strictly photo playhouse." Around 1914, construction on the Clinton Street Theater began, and the cinema began showing features in 1915. By 1916, it was reported in The Moving Picture World that Portland had "the finest array of photoplay theaters of any of the cities on the Pacific Coast given its population. This statement is based on the fact that the homes of photodrama in Portland were built for that purpose within recent years and are not rehabilitated broken down theaters that once housed "legit" and burlesque shows."

=== 1920–1949: Sound films ===
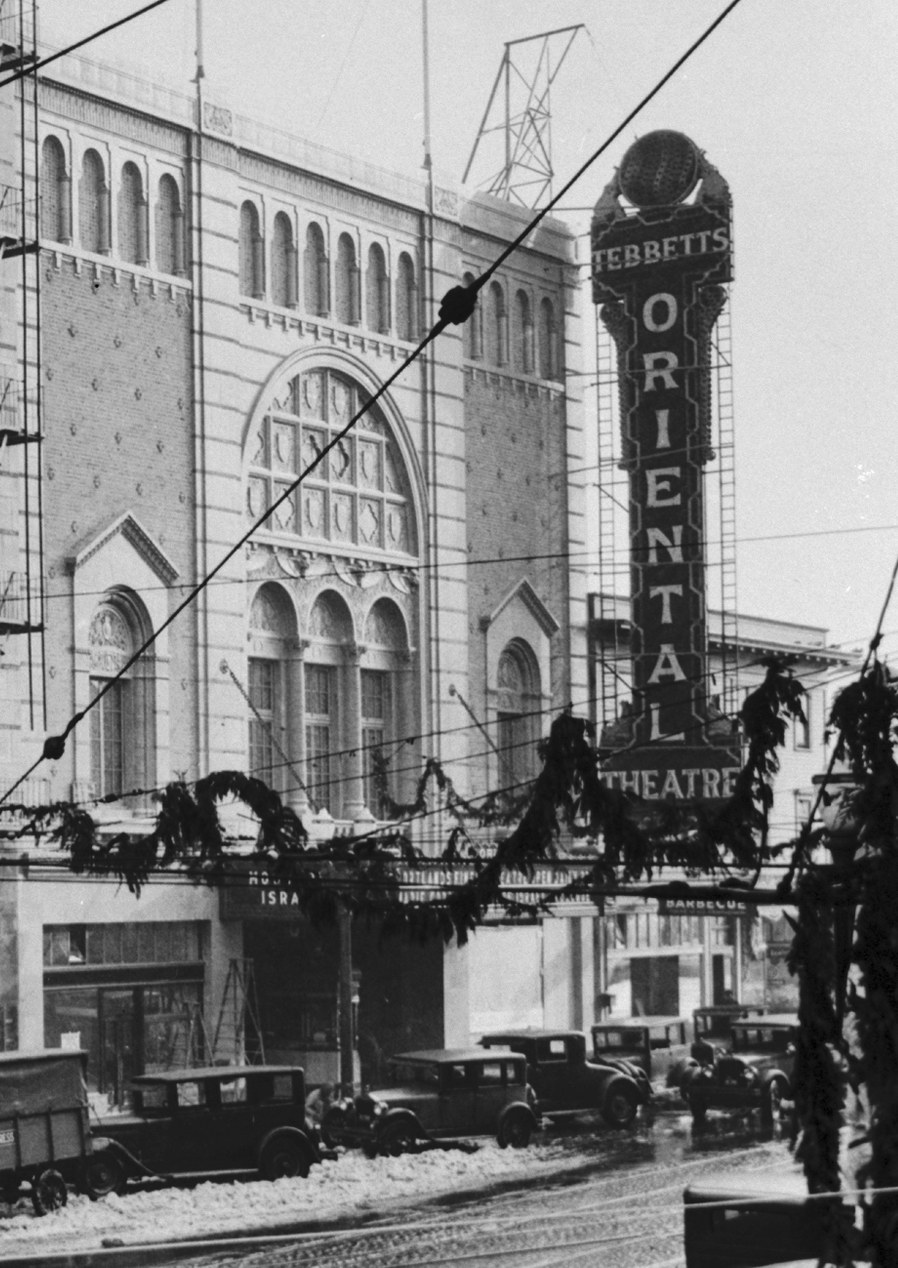
Opening of the Oriental Theatre, December 31, 1927

After commercial production of the sound film began in 1923, numerous cinemas were constructed in Portland throughout the remainder of the decade. The Art Deco-inspired Laurelhurst Theater was constructed that year in east Portland, followed by the Roseway Theater in 1924, and the Moreland and Oregon Theatres in 1925 (all in east Portland). In 1926, the Hollywood Theatre was built in the city's the Hollywood District, designed by John V. Bennes, with an exterior resembling Spanish Colonial architecture, and the interior being based on the Baths of Caracalla and Bernini. The Broadway Theatre was also constructed in 1926 in downtown Portland, at 1008 SW Broadway. The exotic Mission Revival-inspired Bagdad Theatre was constructed in 1927 in the city's Hawthorne District, a project funded by Universal Pictures. Other cinemas built in the city in 1927 include the Oriental Theatre and the Aladdin Theater, the latter of which opened on Christmas Day that year.

The lavish Portland Publix Theatre (contemporarily the Arlene Schnitzer Concert Hall) was constructed in downtown in 1928, and featured an unprecedented seat count of over 3,000. Construction of the theater used over 700,000 common bricks and over 350,000 exterior bricks. The construction of the venue cost around $1.4 million, and it opened on March 28, 1928. In 1930, it was recommissioned as the Paramount Theatre, and eventually ceased functions as a cinema, becoming the Arlene Schnitzer Concert Hall in 1984. Contemporarily, it is the last movie palace in downtown Portland to survive into the 21st century.

With the growing popularity of the sound film, some establishments that had earlier functioned as burlesque or vaudeville houses were retrofitted to screen films, including the Fox Theatre (originally an opera and vaudeville venue), which began showing feature films in 1929. The Union Theatre (later known as the Paris Theatre), a burlesque house built in 1922, also began showing films, and became known as the Third Avenue Theatre in 1930. 1948 saw the opening of the 673-seat Academy Theater in Portland's Montavilla neighborhood, one of the few neighborhood cinemas to be built in the city after the 1920s.

=== 1950–1980: Drive-ins and demolitions ===
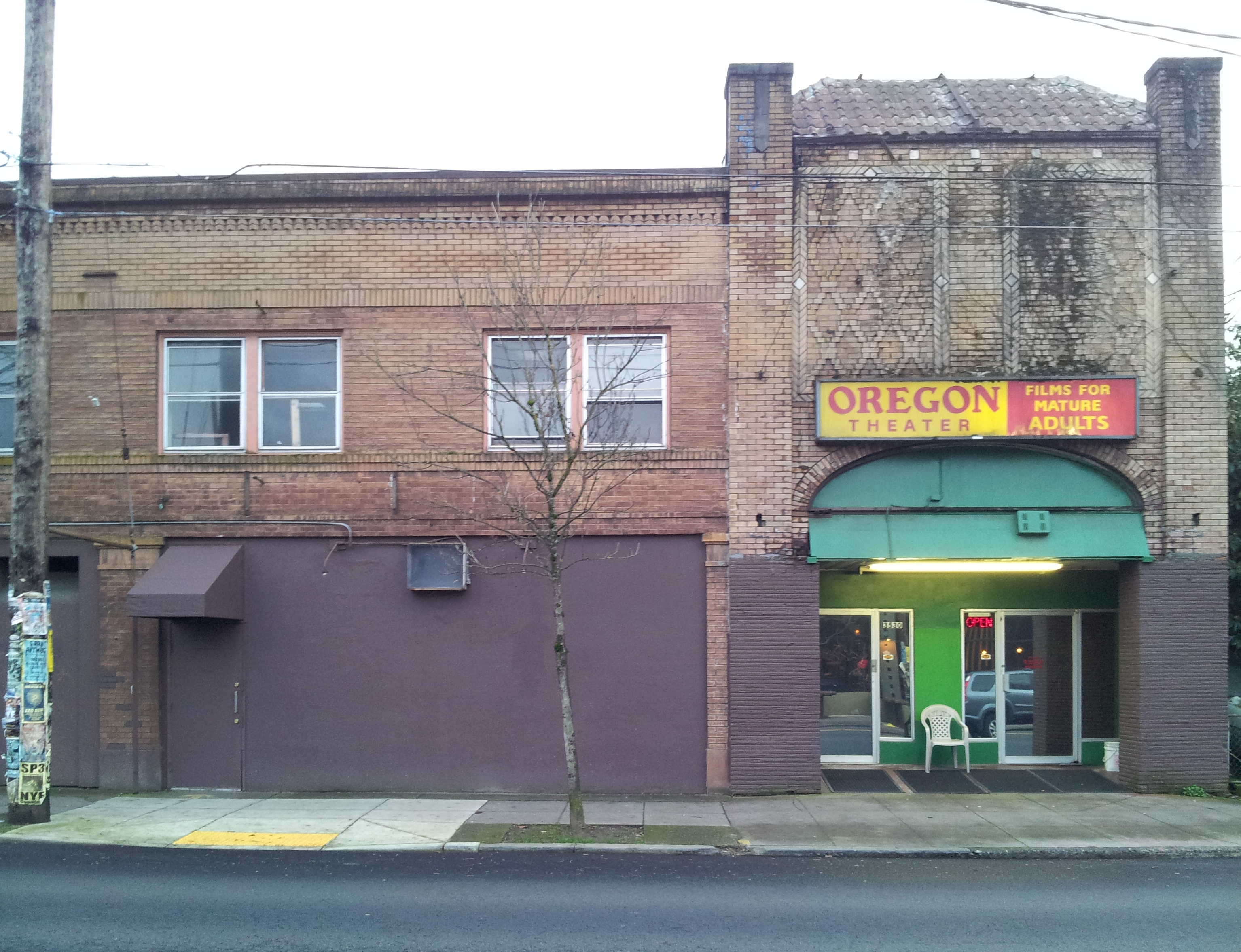
Cinemas such as the Oregon Theatre began showing pornographic films in the 1970s

Beginning around the 1950s, many cinemas in the city underwent renovations, while others were outright destroyed. The Playhouse Theatre (originally the Baker, and formerly known as the Dufwin, Alcazar, Music Box, and El Capitan in the interim) was closed in June 1950. The building was used for church services before being demolished in 1954. The following year, the Majestic Theatre closed, and was eventually demolished in 1957 to make way for the Union Bank Tower. Three months after the demolition of the Majestic, the People's Theater, a movie house built in 1911 (subsequently named the Alder Theatre and the Music Box in the 1930s), was razed as well. The Oriental Theatre was also demolished several years later in April 1970. In the weeks prior to its demolition, various pieces of furniture and other fixtures from the cinema's interiors were auctioned to locals. The Academy Theater closed in 1977, and was used as a printing facility for the ensuing two decades.

In the 1960s, some of the city's older venues turned toward screening pornographic films, and became adult movie theaters; among these were the Paris Theatre, which screened adult films from 1963 into the 1980s, and the Star Theatre, which operated primarily as an adult theater from the 1960s until 1983. The Oregon Theatre began showing adult films around the 1970s, following the success of Deep Throat (1972).

Drive-in cinemas began to grow in popularity in the late 1940s and throughout the 1960s, and the first in Portland—the 82nd Street Drive-in—was constructed in 1948. Construction on the Powell Boulevard Drive-in began in southeast Portland in 1954, despite legal protests from neighborhood residents. A third drive-in on the city's east side, the 104th Street Drive-in, was built in 1959. The Foster Drive-in, located on SE Foster Road, was established in 1969. The first multiplex in Portland, the Eastgate Theater, opened in 1966 on SE 82nd Avenue, and featured two screens and state-of-the-art sound. The Fifth Avenue Cinema, located in southwest Portland along the edge of the Portland State University campus, was opened as a Moyer Theater in 1970. After ten years of operation, the cinema was acquired by Portland State, and has been operated by the university film department since. In 1974, the Bagdad underwent renovation, and was divided to contain two separate screens.

=== 1981–2018: Revitalization and multiplexes ===
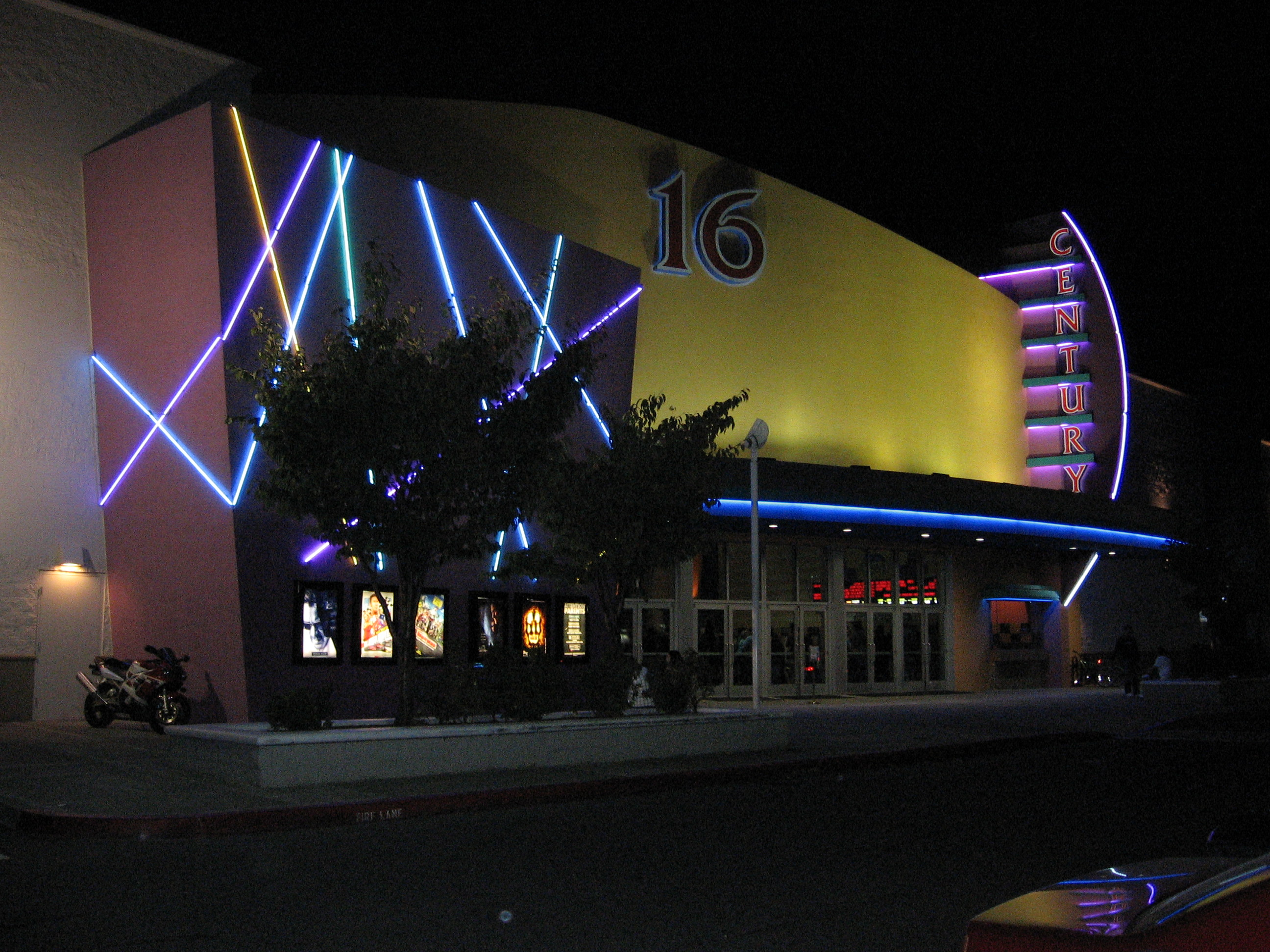
Century Eastport Plaza in 2007

In the late 1980s, a multiplex was opened in northeast Portland across the street from the Lloyd Center mall, known as the Lloyd Center 10 and owned by Regal Entertainment Group. Four years later, a second Regal multiplex opened inside the Lloyd Center mall, named the Lloyd Mall 8. Regal also opened the Broadway Metroplex 4 around this time, which occupied the space where the original Broadway Theatre had been prior to its demolition in 1988. Regal subsequently acquired the Division Street Stadium 13, in east Portland (near Gresham), which had opened as an ACT III cinema in 1997. Also starting in the late 1980s, several local cinemas were established and/or renovated by McMenamins, a restaurant, brewery, and hotel company based in Portland. Among these were the Mission Theater and Pub, established in a former church in 1987, and the Bagdad Theatre, which they acquired in 1991. The company also opened small cinemas in the Kennedy School in 1997, and the National Cash Register Building in 1998.

Century Theatres opened the Eastport Plaza 16 in 1998, a multiplex on SE 82nd Avenue near the Eastgate Theater, the latter of which subsequently closed in 2001. The 2000s saw Regal opening an additional two multiplexes in Portland: the Fox Tower Stadium 10 in 2000, which specializes in art house films, and the Pioneer Place Stadium 6. The Academy Theater, which had been closed since 1977, was renovated and reopened as a three-screen cinema in 2006. The Regal Broadway Metroplex was closed in 2011. The sound system for the Broadway Metroplex was salvaged by the Hollywood Theatre, which underwent renovations in 2013.

Since the 2010s, several cinemas in the city also serve craft beers to patrons, including the Hollywood, Laurelhurst, Cinema 21, the Academy, and the Moreland. The Living Room Theaters, a small independent multiplex that opened in 2006, has a full restaurant and bar that serves prepared food to patrons' seats during screenings.

== Cinemas ==
Note: Status refers only to whether or not the venue still screens films; some noted as inactive still function as other types of arts venues.

† indicates building has been demolished or destroyed

=== Movie houses ===
Opened	Name	Location	Status	Notes	NRHP #	Ref.
	26th Avenue Theatre; See: Clinton Street Theater					
1948	Academy Theater	7818 SE Stark Street	Active	Renovated in 2006; temporarily closed due to fire in 2017.	—N/a	
	Alcazar Theatre; See: Playhouse Theatre					
	Alder Theatre; See: People's Theater					
1912	Avalon Theatre	3451 Belmont Street	Active	Originally the Sunnyside Theatre.	—N/a	
1927	Aladdin Theater	3107 SE Milwaukee Avenue	Active	Originally the Geller's Theatre, a vaudeville venue; opened Christmas Day 1927.	—N/a	
	Alameda Theatre; See: Alberta Rose Theatre					
1927	Alberta Rose Theatre	3000 NE Alberta Street	Inactive	Originally the Alameda Theatre. Stopped showing films in 1978, and contemporarily functions as a performing arts venue.	—N/a	
1913	Alhambra Theatre	4811 SE Hawthorne Boulevard	Inactive	Later known as Sabala's, the Mt. Tabor Legacy, and Mt. Tabor Theater. Subsequently, served as a live music venue, and houses an arcade as of 2016.	—N/a	
1926	Bagdad Theatre	3708–26 SE Hawthorne Boulevard	Active	Acquired by McMenamins in 1991.	89000099	
	Baker Theatre; See: Playhouse Theatre					
1991	Broadway Metroplex 4	1000 SW Broadway	Inactive	Located in the block once occupied by the original Broadway Theatre built in 1926; owned by Regal. Closed in September 2011. Sound system was salvaged by the Hollywood Theatre.	—N/a	
	Broadway Theatre (1916); See: Liberty Theatre					
1926	Broadway Theatre	1008 SW Broadway	Inactive †	Located across from the Portland Publix Theater. Demolished in 1988.	—N/a	
1926	Cinema 21	616 NW 21st Avenue	Active	Independent cinema primarily showing art house films.	—N/a	
1914	Clinton Street Theater	2522 SE Clinton Street	Active	Known as the 26th Avenue Theatre in 1945 and the Encore in 1969 before returning to its original name.	—N/a	
1913	Columbia Theater	106 SW 6th Avenue	Inactive †		—N/a	
1911	Dekum Street Theater	814 NE Dekum St	Inactive	Silent movie house now used as a bar and performance space.	—N/a	
1997	Division Street Stadium 13	16603 SE Division Street	Active	Previously owned by ACT III; acquired by Regal.	—N/a	
	Dufwin Theatre; See: Playhouse Theatre					
1966	Eastgate Theater	2025 SE 82nd Avenue	Inactive	First multiplex in Portland; originally a two-screen cinema, though a third was subsequently added. Closed in 2001; building is contemporarily used as a Slavic church.	—N/a	
1998	Eastport Plaza 16	4040 SE 82nd Avenue	Active	Originally owned by Century Theatres; subsequently acquired by Cinemark, but retains Century brand.	—N/a	
1924	Egyptian Theatre	2511 NE Martin Luther King Jr. Boulevard	Inactive	Closed in 1962, used as a warehouse, now used as a church.	—N/a	
	El Capitan Theatre; See: Playhouse Theatre					
	Empress Theatre (759 SW Broadway); See: Orpheum Theatre					
	Empress Theatre (411 SW Broadway); See: Liberty Theatre					
	Encore Theatre; See: Clinton Street Theater					
1970	Fifth Avenue Cinema	510 SW Hall Street	Active	Originally owned by Moyer Theaters. Acquired by Portland State University in 1980 and has since been operated by the university film department.	—N/a	
1910	Fox Theatre	SW Broadway and Taylor Street	Inactive †	Originally an opera house, leased for films and vaudeville beginning in 1929. Also known as the Heilig, Rialto, and Mayfair Theater. Demolished in 1997.	—N/a	
2000	Fox Tower Stadium 10	846 SW Park Avenue	Active	Located within the Fox Tower building; owned by Regal.	—N/a	
	Geller's Theatre; See: Aladdin Theater					
1912	Globe Theatre	1032 SW Washington Street	Inactive †	Renovated and renamed the Blue Mouse Theatre in 1921. Showed the first sound picture in Portland in 1926: John Barrymore in Don Juan.	—N/a	
1927	Guild Theatre	829 SW 9th Avenue	Inactive	Originally known as the Taylor Street Theatre. Closed in 2006.	—N/a	
	Heilig Theatre; See: Fox Theatre					
	Hippodrome Theatre; See: Orpheum Theatre					
1926	Hollywood Theatre	4122 NE Sandy Boulevard	Active		83002172	
1997	Kennedy School	5736 NE 33rd Avenue	Active	Kennedy School was acquired by McMenamins, who converted the property into a hotel and restaurant c. 1997; gymnasium was converted into a cinema.	88003472	
1923	Laurelhurst Theater	2735 E Burnside Street	Active		—N/a	
1914	Liberty Theatre	411 SW Broadway	Inactive †	2,200-seat cinema, commissioned as the Broadway Theatre, but opened as the Orpheum. Renamed the Empress in 1915; reprised Broadway name in 1916; then reprised original Liberty name in 1916. Closed in 1959.	—N/a	
2006	Living Room Theaters	341 SW Tenth Avenue	Active	Showcases independent films, and offers a full food menu and bar serving concessions to patrons' seats.	—N/a	
1987	Lloyd Center 10	1510 NE Multnomah Street	Active	Owned by Regal. Due for redevelopment as of 2018.	—N/a	
1991	Lloyd Mall 8	2320 Lloyd Center Mall	Inactive	Located within Lloyd Center mall; originally owned by Act III before being acquired by Regal in 1998. Converted into office space in 2015.	—N/a	
1911	Majestic Theatre	739 SW Washington Street	Inactive †	First movie palace in the city of Portland; renamed the United Artists Theatre in 1929. Demolished in 1957.	—N/a	
	Mayfair Theater; See: Fox Theatre					
1987	Mission Theater and Pub	1624 NW Glisan Street	Active	Former Swedish church acquired by McMenamins in 1987, partially converted into a cinema.	—N/a	
1925	Moreland Theater	6712 SE Milwaukie Avenue	Active		—N/a	
	Mt. Tabor Legacy or Mt. Tabor Theater; See: Alhambra Theatre					
	Music Box Theatre (SW Morrison Street and 11th Avenue); See: Playhouse Theatre					
	Music Box Theatre (901 SW Alder Street); See: People's Theater					
	Newsreel Theatre; See: Rivoli Theatre					
	Northgate Theater; See: St. Johns Twin Cinema					
1971	Northwest Film Center	934 SW Salmon Street	Active	Formerly located in the Guild Theatre building from 1998 to 2006.	—N/a	
1925	Oregon Theatre	3530 SE Division Street	Inactive	Originally used for vaudeville and films; served as an adult movie theater beginning in the 1970s. Closed in March 2020.	—N/a	
1927	Oriental Theatre	828 SE Grand	Inactive †	Demolished in 1970.	—N/a	
1913	Orpheum Theatre	759 SW Broadway	Inactive †	Renamed the Empress Theatre shortly after opening; the T & D Theatre after 1916; the Hippodrome Theatre after 1917; and the Pantages Theatre from 1927 to 1929. Reprised Orpheum name after 1929. Demolished in 1976.	—N/a	
	Orpheum Theatre (411 SW Broadway); See: Liberty Theatre					
	Pantages Theatre; See: Orpheum Theatre					
	Paramount Theater; See: Portland Publix Theatre					
1922	Paris Theatre	6 SW Third Avenue	Inactive	Originally a burlesque house; later known as Third Avenue Theatre. Served as an adult movie theater from 2006 to 2016, after which it was converted to a live music venue.	—N/a	
1911	People's Theater	901 SW Alder Street	Inactive †	Was extensively renovated in 1929 by John V. Bennes and Herman Herzog and reopened as the Alder Theatre; in 1935 it was renamed the Music Box Theatre.	—N/a	
2003	Pioneer Place Stadium 6	340 SW Morrison Street	Active	Located within Pioneer Place mall; owned by Regal.	—N/a	
1910	Playhouse Theatre	SW Morrison Street and 11th Avenue	Inactive †	Opened as the Baker Theatre; subsequently known as the Dufwin, Alcazar, Music Box, and El Capitan. Demolished in 1954.	—N/a	
1928	Portland Publix Theater	1037 SW Broadway	Inactive	Known as the Paramount Theater after 1930. Has served as the Arlene Schnitzer Concert Hall since 1984.	76001585	
	Rialto Theatre; See: Fox Theatre					
1920	Rivoli Theatre	809 SW Washington Street	Inactive †	Opened in January 1920, and featured 1,200 seats. Renamed the Newsreel Theatre in 1941, and later the Roxy.	—N/a	
1976	Rose Moyer Theater	16501 SE Division Street	Inactive †		—N/a	
1924	Roseway Theater	7229 NE Sandy Boulevard	Inactive †	Destroyed by fire in 2022.	—N/a	
	Roxy Theatre; See: Rivoli Theatre					
1998	St. Johns Theatre & Pub	8203 N Ivanhoe Street	Active	Formerly the National Cash Register Building; acquired by McMenamins and converted into a pub and cinema in 1998.	—N/a	
	Sabala's Theatre; See: Alhambra Theatre					
1913	St. Johns Twin Cinema	8704 N Lombard Street	Active	Formerly known as the Northgate Theater and St. Johns Theater.	—N/a	
	St. Johns Theater; See: St. Johns Twin Cinema					
1908	Star Theater	13 NW 6th Avenue	Inactive	Originally a silent film house; subsequently operated as an adult movie theater. Serves as a performing arts venue as of 2018.	—N/a	
	Sunnyside Theatre; See: Avalon Theatre					
	T & D Theatre; See: Orpheum Theatre					
	Taylor Street Theatre; See: Guild Theatre					
	Third Avenue Theatre; See: Paris Theatre					
	United Artists Theatre; See: Majestic Theatre					

=== Drive-ins ===
Opened	Name	Location	Status	Notes	NRHP #	Ref.
1948	82nd Street Drive-in	9600 SE 82nd Avenue	Inactive †	City's first drive-in cinema; second screen installed in 1976 before the venue was closed in 1985.	—N/a	
1959	104th Street Drive-in	SE Powell Boulevard & SE 108th Avenue	Inactive †	Original drive-in sign remains as of 2017.	—N/a	
Unknown	Division Street Drive-In	16501 SE Division Street	Inactive †	Demolished for construction of Rose Moyer Theater in 1976	—N/a	
1969	Foster Drive-in	11501 SE Foster Road	Inactive †	1,800-car capacity drive-in, originally owned by Tom Moyer Group; expanded to three screens in 1974. Subsequently, owned by Regal. Closed in 1998 and demolished in 1999.	—N/a	
1954	Powell Boulevard Drive-in	11040 SE Bush Street	Inactive †		—N/a	

== See also ==
- Culture of Portland, Oregon
- History of Portland, Oregon

== Sources ==
- Lacher, Gary; Stone, Steve (2009). Theatres of Portland. Mount Pleasant, South Carolina: Arcadia Publishing. ISBN 978-1-439-63831-6.
- Palahniuk, Chuck (2007). Fugitives and Refugees: A Walk in Portland, Oregon. New York: Crown Publishing. ISBN 978-0-307-42075-6.
