= Portland Film Festival =

- Location: Portland, Oregon
- Founded: 2013
- Website: www.portlandfilmfestival.com

Portland Film Festival is a non-profit organization which hosts events and programs in Portland, Oregon. It was founded in 2013 by Joshua Leake with the help of Jay Cornelius. Their main event called the Portland Film Festival is an annual independent film festival that is held in several local theaters in Portland. This event focuses on showcasing films, but also provides food, a range of events to participate in, and other forms of entertainment.

== History ==
Jay Cornelius helped Leake set up the first festival by recruiting people that he knew from his previous job as a film instructor. There were over 148 volunteers that helped pull off the first Portland Film Festival. These volunteers helped with a wide range of activities from directing music, operations, other volunteers, and social media, to helping with legal advising, talking photos, and more.

The first film festival was held from August 27 through September 1, 2013 and featured networking events, workshops, a beer garden, and food carts. 83 films were shown in the inaugural festival and over 600 were submitted for consideration at the festival.

== Theaters and Venues ==
The festival has been hosted at a range of locations across Portland including Fifth Avenue Cinema, Clinton Street Theater, Cinema 21, Crystal Ballroom, Crystal Ball & Restaurant, Hollywood Theater, Laurelhurst Theater, Living Room Theater, Mission Theater and Pub, Plum Tree Mortgage Education Center, Pro Photo Supply Event Center, Wallace Park, Tom McCall Waterfront Park, White Space Gallery, The Fields Park, and the Hi-Lo Hotel.

== See also ==
- Culture of Portland, Oregon
- List of film festivals in the United States
