= Foster Theater =

Building in Portland, Oregon, U.S.

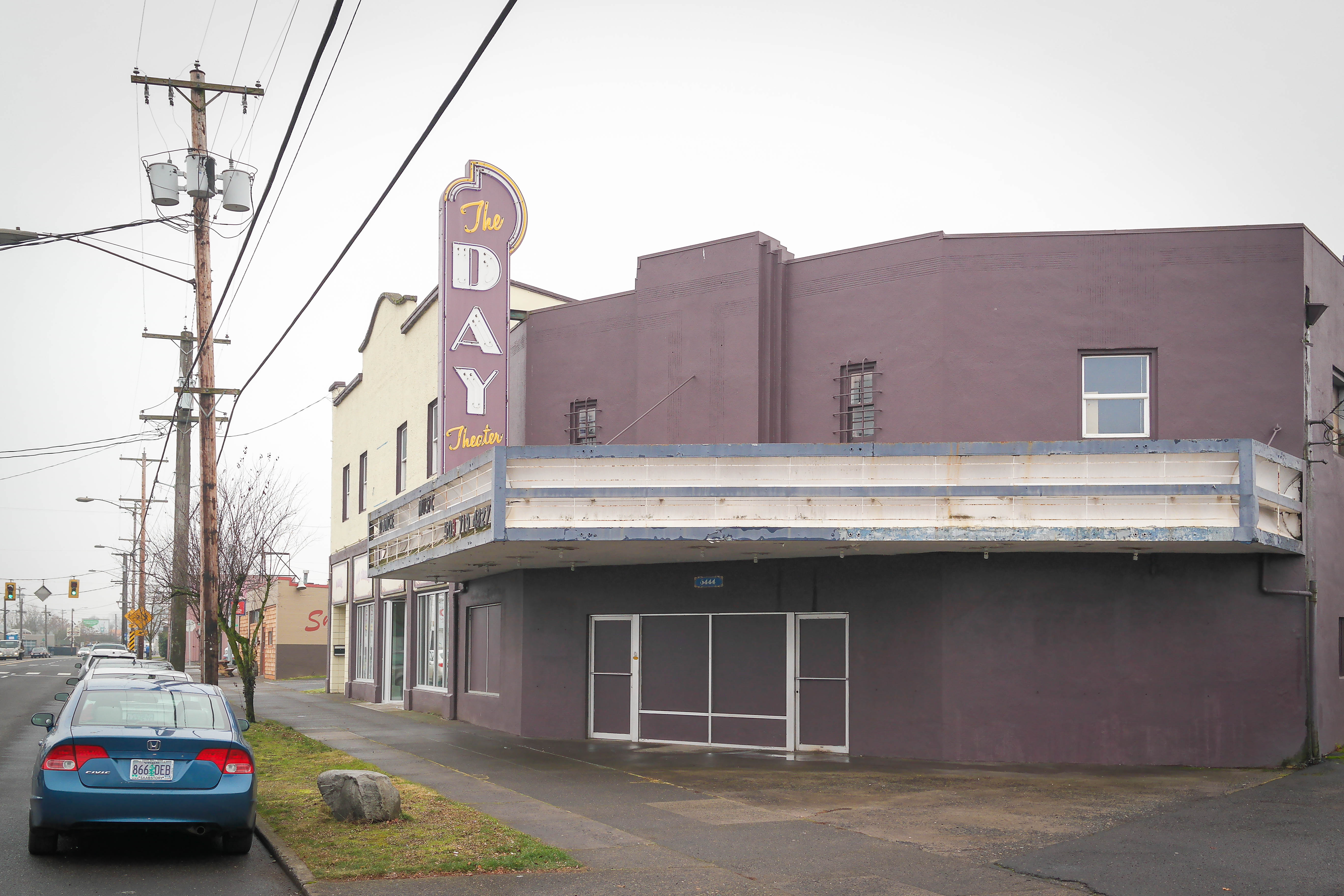
- The building's exterior in 2013
- Interactive map of the Foster Theater area

General information
- Location: 5444 SE Foster Rd, Portland, OR 97206
- Coordinates: 45°29′39″N 122°36′23″W

Website
- fostertheaterpdx.com

The Foster Theater, formerly known as the Day Theater, is a historic building on Foster Road southeast Portland, Oregon's Creston-Kenilworth neighborhood. The 7,400 square foot building was completed in 1915.

As of 2025, it has been reopened under new ownership, paying respect to its storied past with an art deco interior and bright neon sign. It is now currently co-owned with the Classical Ballet Academy and regularly host their performances while also exploring a wide range of other shows and events.

== See also ==
- List of theatres in Portland, Oregon
