= Imago Theatre (Portland, Oregon) =

Theatre company in Portland, Oregon, U.S.

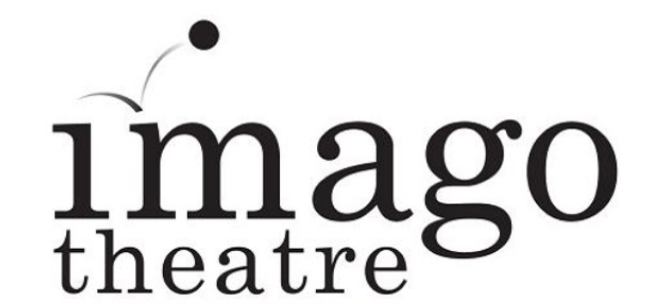
- Logo

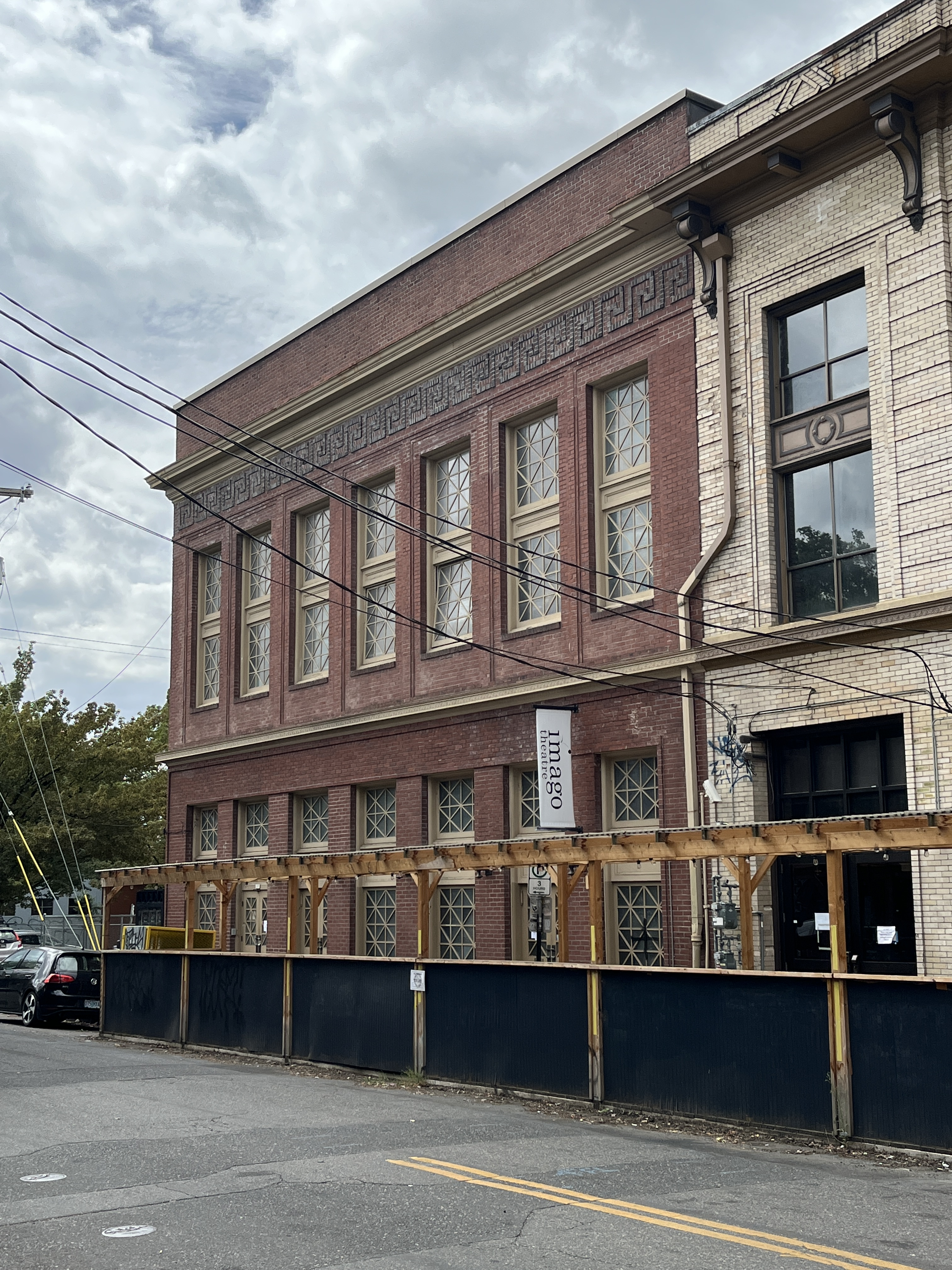
- Formation: 1982
- Type: Theatre group
- Location: Portland, Oregon, U.S.
- Website: imagotheatre.com

Imago Theatre is a theatre company based in Portland, Oregon, United States. Co-Artistic Directors, Carol Triffle and Jerry Mouawad, began collaborating in 1979 and founded Imago Theatre in 1982.

== History ==
In addition to family shows that have toured nationally and internationally with extended appearances at the New Victory Theater in New York and American Repertory Theater in Boston, the company has produced dozens of experimental original works locally. Their work is influenced by Jacques Lecoq. Triffle studied with Lecoq at L'École Internationale de Théâtre Jacques Lecoq, and Mouawad studied Lecoq-based theatre at the Hayes-Marshall School of Theatre Arts. The company is known for creating productions that "combine absurdity with the universal themes of humanity both humorous and poignant and told in a most unique way."

In 1992, Imago converted a 1924 historic masonic lodge in Southeast Portland to a 200-seat theatre, while using the upper level as a workshop and development space.

== Productions ==
- Frogz (1979)
- Verdad (1993)
- Buffo (1995)
- Phoenicians in the House (1994)
- Samuel's Major Problems (1995)
- Ajax (1996)
- Symphony of Rats (1996)
- Half Light (1997)
- Ginger's Green (1997)
- Dead End Ed (1998)
- No Exit (1998)
- Trailer Park Paradise (1999)
- House Taken Over (1999)
- Blood Wedding, Blood Wedding (1999)
- Oh Lost Weekend (2000)
- Imaginary Invalid (2000)
- No Can Do (2001)
- Exit the King (2002)
- A Number (2003)
- Biglittlethings (2003)
- Missing Mona (2004)
- Uncle Vanya (2004)
- Not Not Not Not Not Enough Oxygen (2005)
- Hit Me in the Stomach (2006)
- Betrayal (2006)
- Mix Up (2007)
- Double Feature: Serial Killer Parents & The Father-Thing (2007)
- The Dinner (2008)
- Vladimir, Vladimir (2008)
- Apis, or The Taste of Honey (2009)
- ZooZoo (2009)
- Simple People (2009)
- Cuban Missile Tango (2009)
- Tick Tack Type (2009)
- Backs Like That (2010)
- Stage Left Lost (2010)
- Splat! (2011)
- Zugzwang (2011)
- The Black Lizard (2012)
- Beaux Arts Club (2013)
- The Lover (2013)
- The Caretaker (2014)
- Pemento & Pullman (2014)
- The Homecoming (2014)
- The Lady Aoi (2016)
- Francesca, Isabella, Margarita on a Cloud (2016)
- Hughie (2016)
- La Belle (2016)
- Savage/Love (2017)
- Medea (2017)
- The Reunion (2017)
- Human Noise (2017)
- Hotel Gone (2018)
- To Fly Again (2018)
- Fallout (2018)
- Title & Deed (2018)
- Leonard Cohen Is Dead (2019)
- Pebble (2019)
- The Strange Case of Nick M. (2021)
- Happy Times (2021)
- Satie's Journey (2021)
- Julia's Place (2022)
- Voiceover (2022)

== See also ==
- Culture of Portland, Oregon
- List of artists and art institutions in Portland, Oregon
- List of theatres in Portland, Oregon
