= Tomorrow Theater =

Theater in Portland, Oregon, U.S.

- Logo

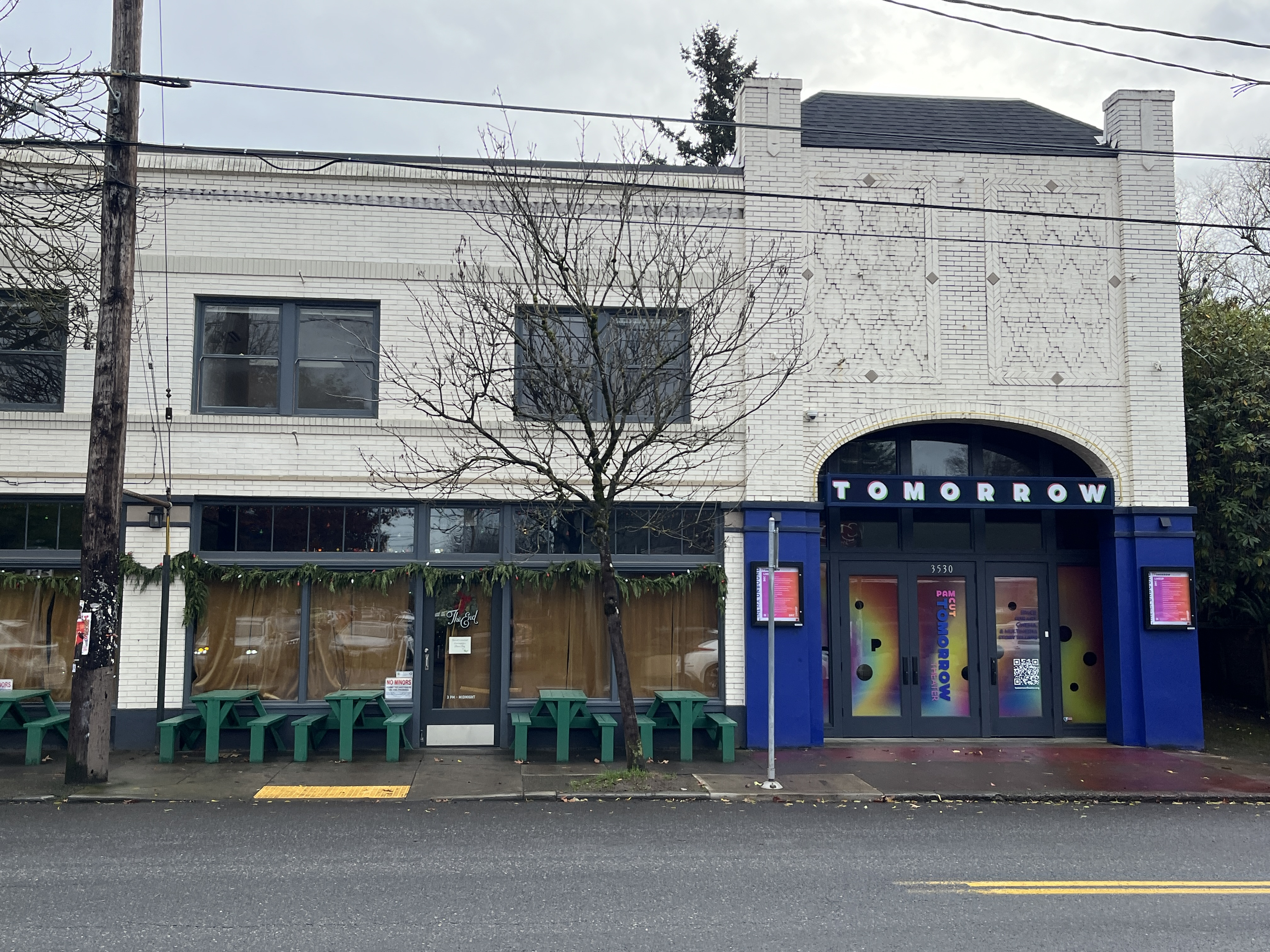
- The building's exterior in 2024

- Location in Portland, Oregon
- Former names: Oregon Theater
- Address: 3530 Southeast Division Street
- Location: Portland, Oregon, United States
- Coordinates: 45.5046278°N 122.6277533°W
- Owner: Maizels family, including Gayne Maizels (1967–2020)
- Operator: Portland Art Museum (2023–present)
- Type: Theater

Construction
- Opened: September 4, 1925
- Architect: Hubert A. Williams

Website
- tomorrowtheater.org

Tomorrow Theater is a movie theater and multimedia space in Portland, Oregon, United States. It is operated by PAM CUT // Center for an Untold Tomorrow, the film and new media center of the Portland Art Museum.

Previously, the venue was an adult movie theater known as Oregon Theater. The building was completed in 1925 and originally housed a Wurlitzer pipe organ and vaudeville stage. It would later screen Hollywood, art-house, and Spanish-language films. The structure was acquired by the Maizels family in 1967 and became an adult cinema in the 1970s. It continued to operate as the city's longest running pornographic cinema and remained owned by a member of the Maizels family until 13 February 2020, when it went into foreclosure. It closed in early March 2020. The Portland Art Museum began operating Tomorrow Theater in 2023.

== Description and history ==
The two-story, roughly 8,700 square foot (810 m^{2}) Oregon Theater was designed by Hubert A. Williams. It exhibits Italianate and "Streetcar Era Commercial" architecture, with plans drafted by Universal Plan Service. The brick exterior includes a glass-filled retail base, beltcourses, double-hung windows on the second story, ornamental brickwork on its parapet, and a flat roof. Upon its completion, the interior featured a $16,000 Wurlitzer pipe organ, ornate lighting fixtures attached to a high-domed ceiling, 750 high-backed chairs, a vaudeville stage, and a screen which measured 16 by 20 feet (4.9 m × 6.1 m). The theater cost $35,000 to construct and began operating on September 4, 1925, possibly for a showing of Steele of the Royal Mounted.

J. W. McFadden Inc. was the building's original owner. Subsequent owners have included C. C. and Leedy Maude, J. S. Middleton, Oregon Theater Co., Mary Watt, and Ernest Bass. The theater's front doors and ticket office were altered by J. W. McFadden Inc. in 1930, along with the construction of a new ticket booth. In 1949, when the Waverly Heights Congregational United Church of Christ was reconstructing a new church building on its property at Southeast 33rd and Woodward, church services were held at the Oregon Theater. According to the Puget Sound Theatre Organ Society, the organ was repossessed by the William Wood Organ Co. and re-installed at radio station KXL's studios in Portland. The theater's front entrance, including its doors and 1930s ticket booth, were remodeled by Ferguson Cassady Co. in 1954.

In 1967, an immigrant family acquired ownership of the theater. The Maizels family also owned other cinemas, including Aladdin Theater, the defunct and demolished Walnut Park, and the Encore, now known as Clinton Street Theater. In addition to Hollywood films, the cinemas screened art-house and Spanish-language movies. Multi-light Broadway Sign Co. installed corrugated aluminum on the bottom of the marquee in 1975.

=== Adult cinema ===
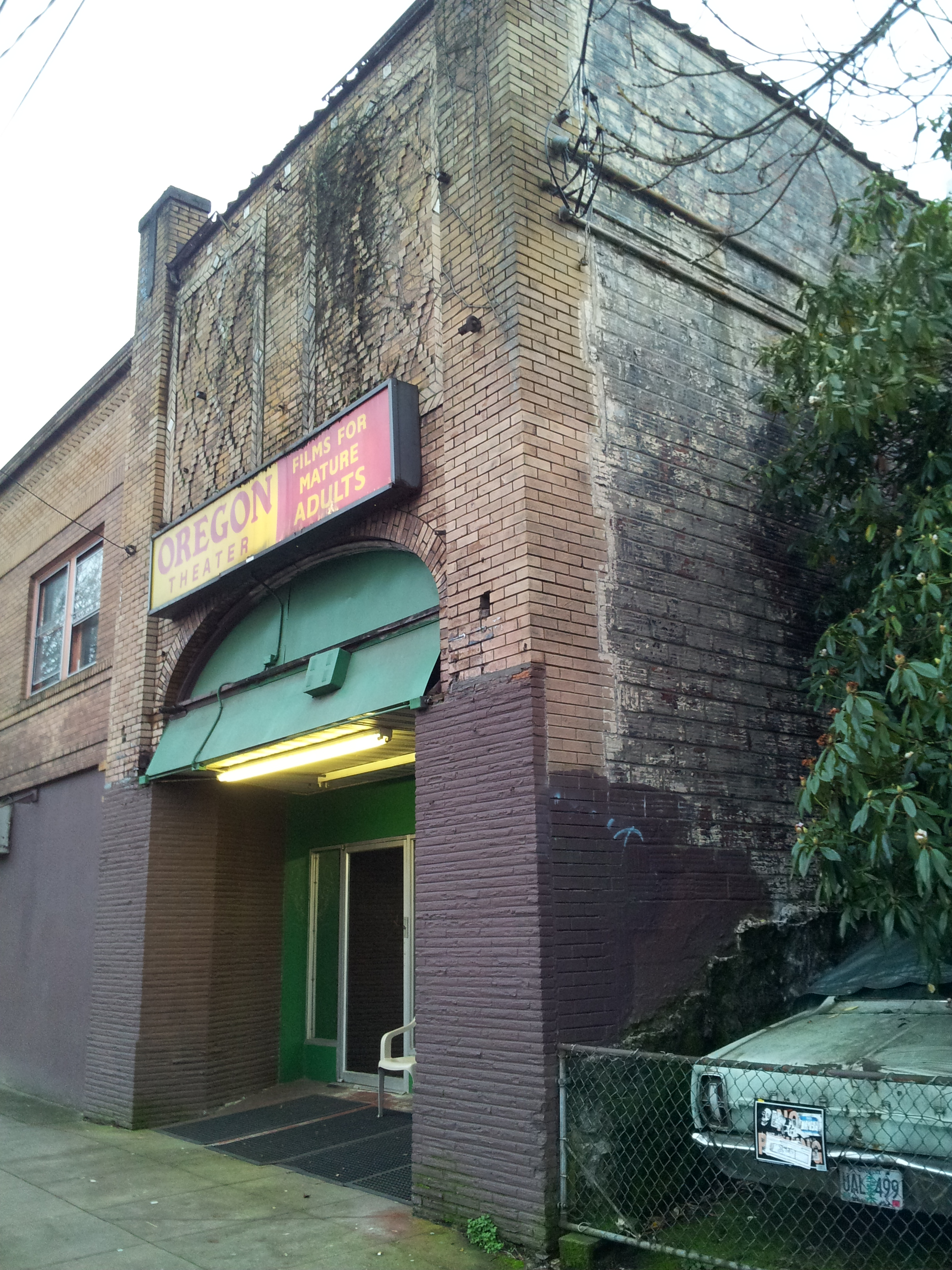
The theater's entrance in 2014

While operating as an adult venue, the Oregon Theater was described as "less creepy than most of its kind" and "out of place" along the newly developed Southeast Division Street. It was also called "the last holdout of an era", referring to both the prominence of adult film screenings in the city during the 1970s and its status as the last property owned by the Maizels family. In 2004, the building was identified as an "Investment and Identity Site" and commended for having attributes valued by the community, such as quality architecture, local ownership, and orientation to the street. The first sexually-explicit film shown at the Oregon was I Am Curious (Yellow) in 1967. That movie gave the theater more business in three days than two-weeks worth of ticket sales from mainstream, non-risque films, prompting the Oregon to show adult movies exclusively.

The success of Deep Throat, which opened in 1972 and played for more than a year, was a turning point, leading to an increase in the number of adult film screenings at more than a dozen cinemas in Portland. However, the rise of video cassettes and cable television led to a decline in cinema attendance, and by the 2000s, the Maizels family had sold all of their properties except for the Oregon Theatre. Gayne Maizels still owns the theater, which continues to operate as the city's longest running pornographic cinema.

As an adult cinema, the single-screen theater replaced traditional auditorium seats with sofas. It began advertising live sex shows in the early part of the 21st century. In 2005, The Portland Mercury said the theater showed heterosexual pornographic films daily except for Wednesdays and Saturdays, when it featured bisexual content. In 2013, Portland Monthly described the venue's green entryway, leading to a ramp lined with adult DVDs and an "indifferent doorman who demands $8. Inside, a few dozen men, mostly seniors, occupy a hodgepodge of old couches in near-total darkness."

In February 2020, the owner went into foreclosure February 13, and the venue closed on March 3.

=== Tomorrow Theater ===
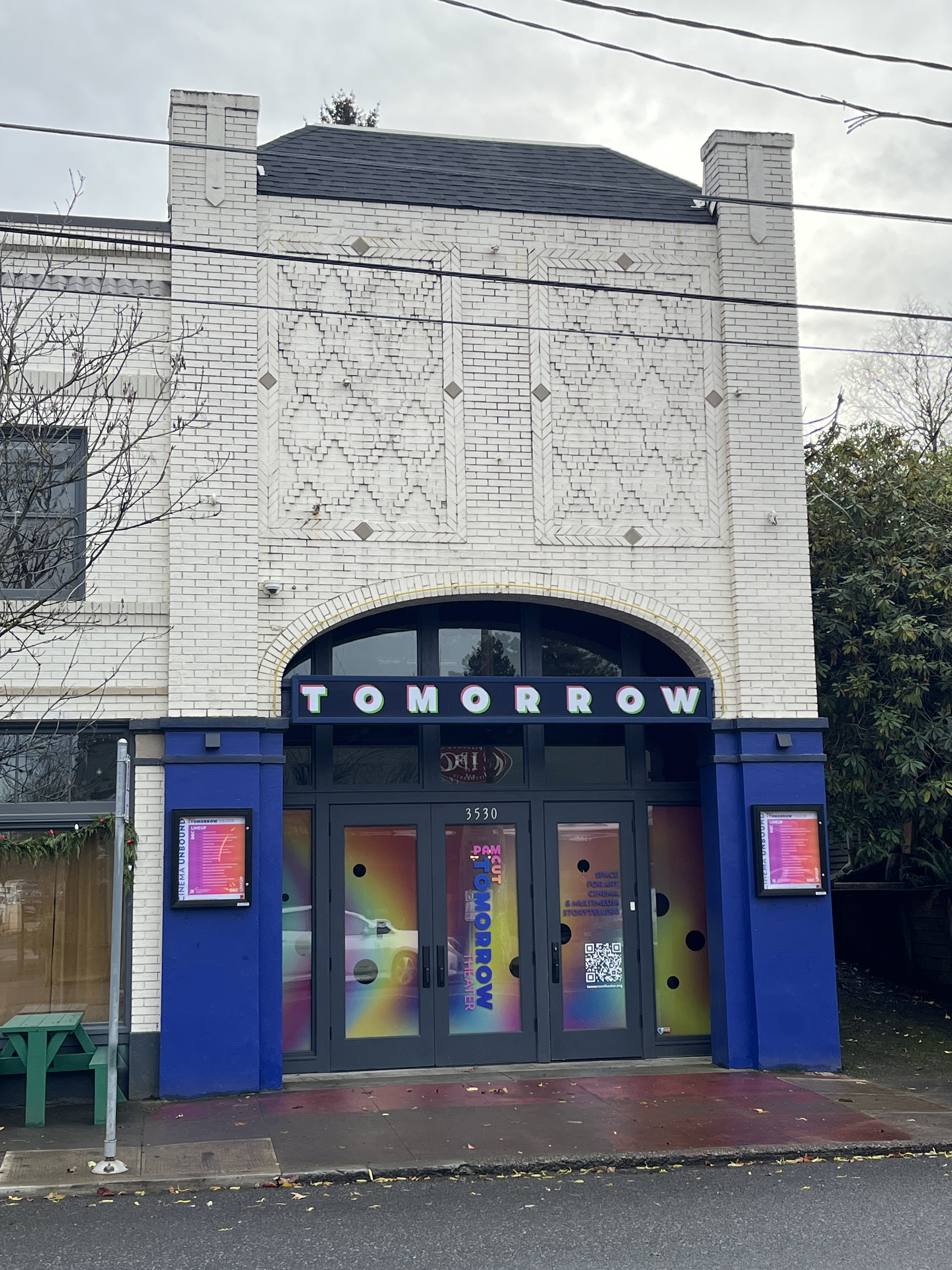
The building's exterior in 2024

The theater reopened as the Tomorrow Theater, described as a "new venue for multimedia storytelling" and operated by the Portland Art Museum, in late 2023.

== Reception ==
According to local film archivist and author Gary Lacher, the Oregon Theater's record as the longest continuously operating adult cinema in Portland is "not often acknowledged publicly" and represents "the last holdout of an era", referring to the prominence of adult film screenings in Portland. In an interview, Lacher expressed his wish that the theater would return to a more traditional cinema, but was thankful that the venue has been spared from closure and demolition to date.

In 2004, GNT Planning included the theater as an "Investment and Identity Site" in their report, which was commissioned by the Division Vision Coalition (DVC), a coalition of community members from the nearby business and neighborhood associations. DVC is invested in the "economy of locally-owned businesses, an attractive streetscape that invites neighbors to linger, and sustainable features that are ecologically sensitive". The building was identified as having attributes valued by the community, including quality architecture, local ownership, and orientation to the street.

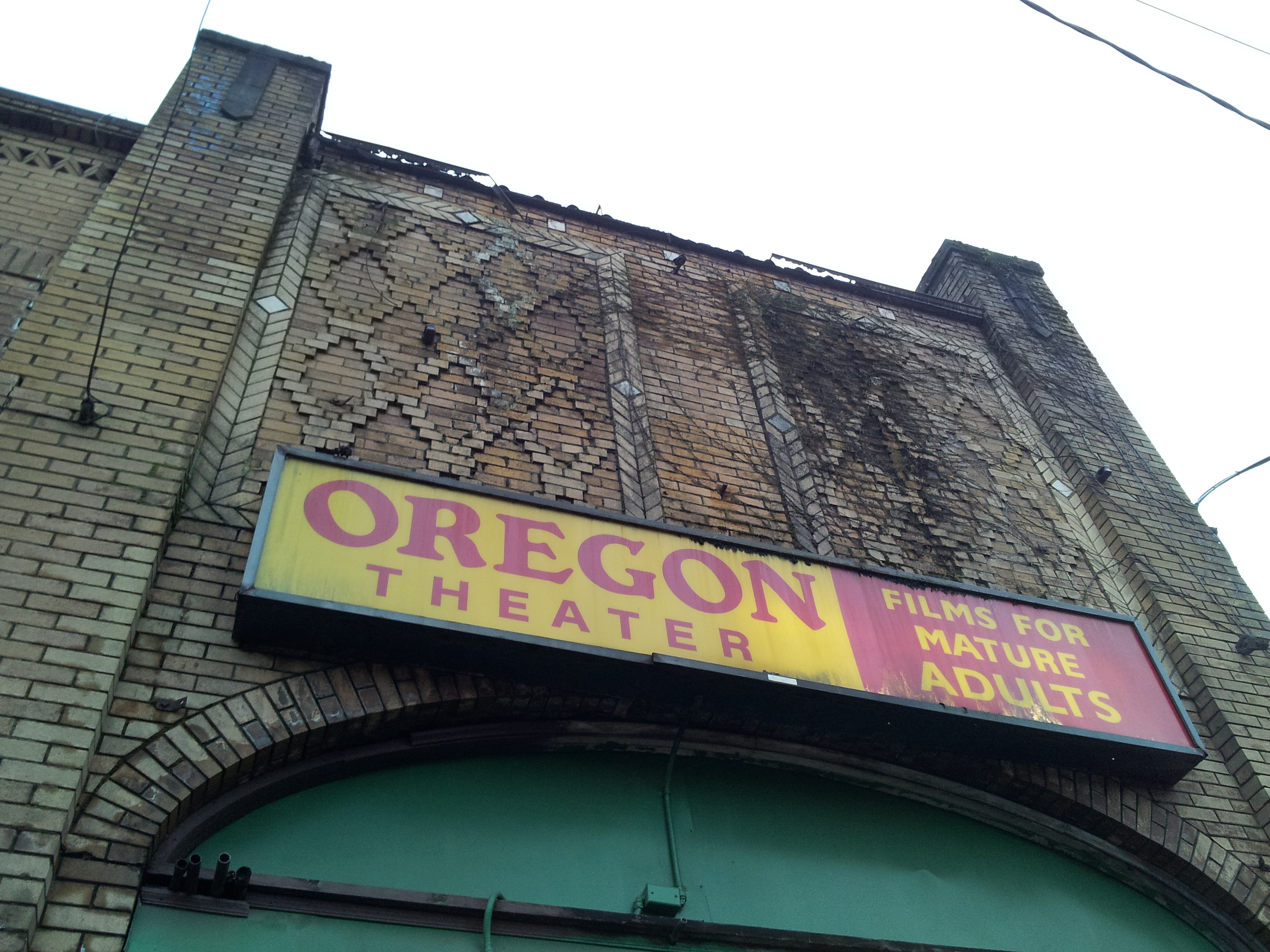
Detail of the theater's architecture and signage, 2014

In its 2005 review of the theater, The Portland Mercury said the "glut of cozy sofas make an outing comfortable", but criticized the venue for having only one screen and for showing predominantly heterosexual films. The publication said that the venue was "[m]ore like an actual cinema than a circle jerk (though chicken-choking is not unheard of).... The [theater] is much less creepy than most of its kind—there's even bicycle parking indoors." In its 2012 Portlandia-related list of "Portland's Most Ill-Advised Valentine's Date Spots", IFC quipped, "Of course, considering the dwindling number of adult theaters across the country, you could make an argument that it's a piece of Portland history, and that visiting wouldn't be much different than going to a museum... on second thought, play it safe and stay away." In 2013, Portland Monthly said the venue "seems out of place", a "dingy brick building" surrounded by the newly developed Southeast Division Street.

After multiple restaurants on Southeast Division were featured in Willamette Week's annual restaurant guide in 2013, the newspaper made humorous "predictions" about what might become of some of the street's existing spaces. It predicted that the Oregon Theater could become "McMenamins Mophouse & Brewery", referring to the McMenamins regional chain of breweries, historic hotels, music venues and pubs. Willamette Week wrote, "When one of the nation's last adult theaters finally succumbs to market pressure, McMenamins rehabs the space while keeping its historic character alive with 'voyeur' dining booths, a sticky dance floor and VIP dining in the bored projectionist's perch." In 2014, Willamette Week called the theater "seedy".

== See also ==
- Pornography in the United States
