= Academy Theater (Portland, Oregon) =

Theater in Portland, Oregon, U.S.

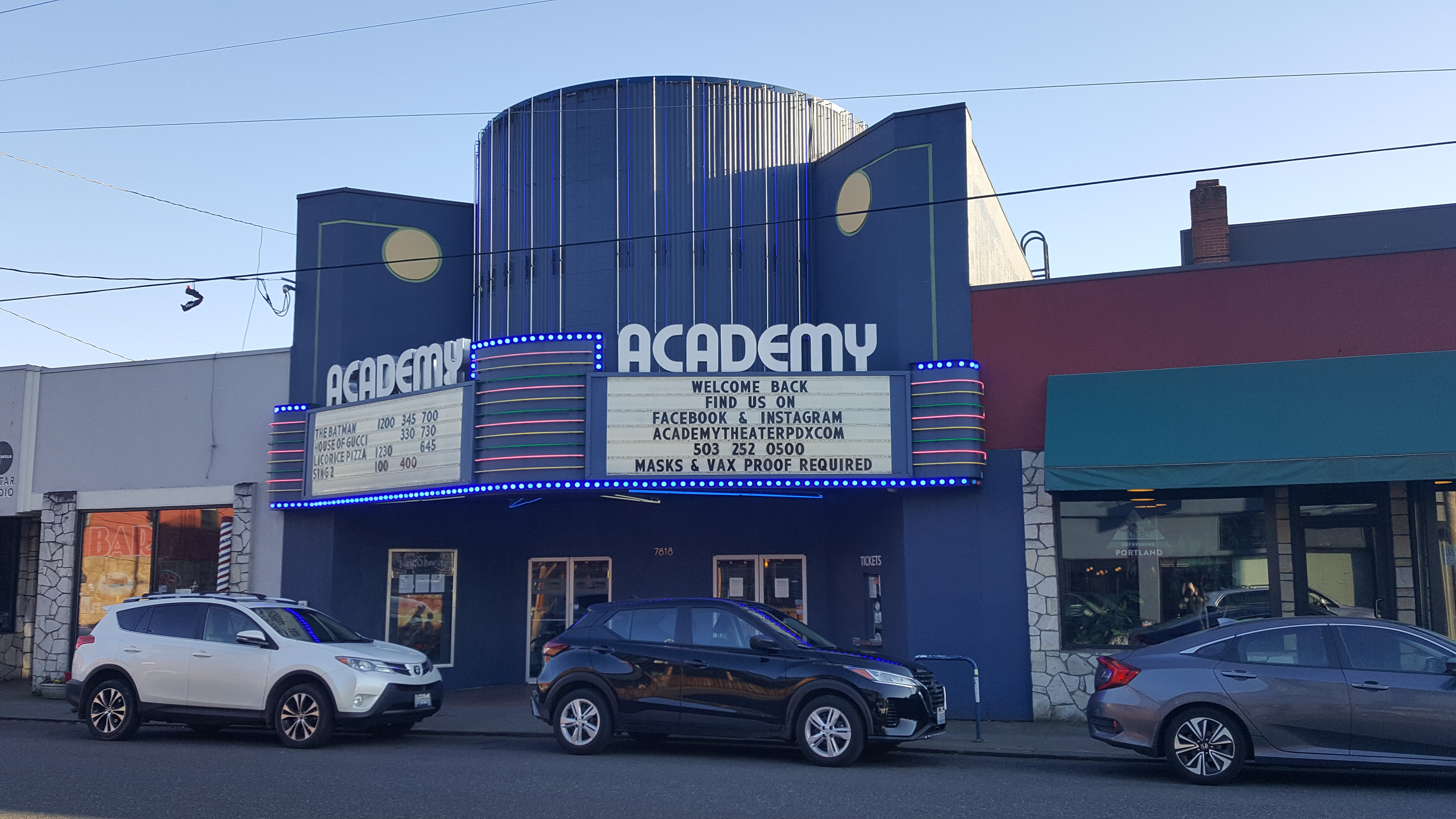
- The building's exterior in 2022

- Location in Portland, Oregon
- Address: 7818 Southeast Stark Street
- Location: Portland, Oregon, U.S.
- Coordinates: 45.5190°N 122.5827°W
- Type: Cinema

Construction
- Opened: 1948
- Renovated: 2006

Website
- academytheaterpdx.com

The Academy Theater is a historic theater in the southeast part of Portland, Oregon's Montavilla neighborhood, in the United States, designed in the Art Deco Streamline Moderne style. The theater opened in 1948, was later used as office space during the 1970s, then returned to function as a theater in 2006 when the building was completely refurbished.

== History ==
Fred Teeny, son of a Lebanese immigrant family involved in various businesses in Portland, partnered with architect James De Young to create a movie theater on the site of Teeny's former dry goods store. The theater was a modern structure for its time, featuring a curved marquee, cylindrical entrance, air conditioning, a sloping floor auditorium, and a nursery for on site childcare. The Academy opened its doors on April 30, 1948, showing the John Wayne romantic drama Tycoon.

In the 1960s, the Academy faced increased competition from the nearby Eastgate Theater, the first multiplex in Portland. The Academy went through several changes in ownership before being purchased by Sam Crawford in the mid-1970s. Under Crawford, the theater was gutted to make space for the printing press of his business, Nickel Ads.

In 2002, the Academy Theater was purchased by Heyward and Julie Stewart, alongside partner Ty Dupuis, who began a renovation project to restore the theater to its original purpose and design. The restored building reopened as a theater-pub in 2004, serving beer and wine as well as concessions and snacks from local Montavilla businesses such as Flying Pie Pizzeria and Bipartisan Cafe.

In 2013 the Stewarts mounted an Indiegogo campaign to purchase and install three digital projectors and a sound system upgrade.

A fire temporarily closed the building in 2018.

In 2022, the theater shifted to showing first-run movies alongside older movies, with The Batman as its first movie premiere in over 50 years.
