= National Cash Register Building =

Historic building in St. John's, Oregon

National Cash Register (NCR) Building
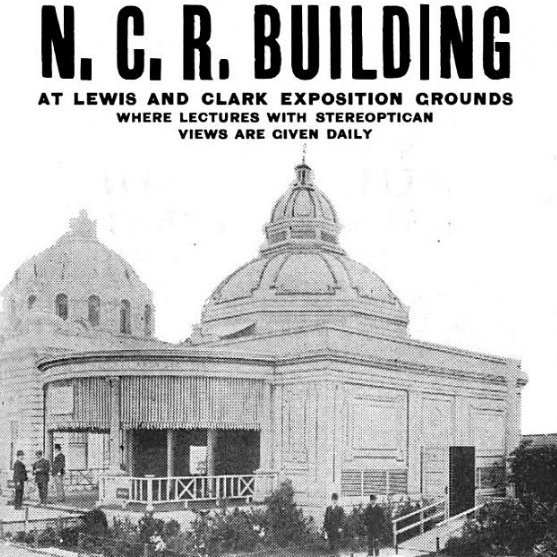
- The National Cash Register Building in 1905

- Location within Portland, Oregon
- Former names: St. Johns First Congregational Church
- Alternative names: St. Johns Theater & Pub

General information
- Coordinates: 45°35′19″N 122°45′6″W
- Opened: 1904, 1905, 1906
- Cost: $5,000
- Renovation cost: $1,000 (1905); $1,200 (1906)
- Owner: NCR Corporation (1904–05); St. Johns Congregational Society (after 1905); McMenamins (present)

Design and construction
- Designations: Portland Historic Landmark

The National Cash Register Building, commonly referred to as the St. Johns Theater & Pub, was a building that was first erected in St. Louis, Missouri, for the Louisiana Purchase Exposition in 1904 and then moved to Portland, Oregon, the next year for the Lewis and Clark Centennial Exposition. It was moved a third and final time to the suburb of St. Johns, Oregon, which is now a part of Portland. It was given to the St. Johns Congregational Society by the NCR Corporation. It now houses a McMenamins theater and pub.

== History ==
The NCR Corporation constructed a $5,000 building for the 1904 Louisiana Purchase Exposition in St. Louis, Missouri. The building was uprooted for $1,000 and transported to Portland, Oregon, for the 1905 Lewis and Clark Centennial Exposition. The building was constructed in sections so that it could be moved with ease. The NCR Corporation passed out badges and sang songs on "NCR Day" at the exposition on September 4, 1905. The Morning Oregonian reported that the building was "crowded all day".

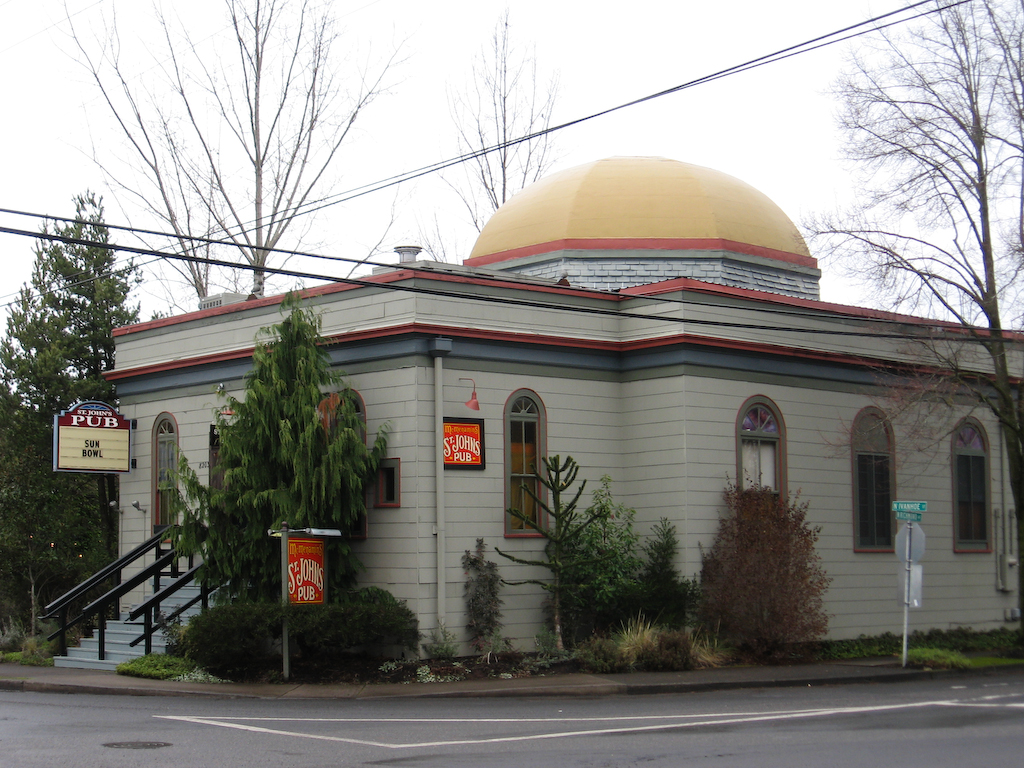
The building in 2008, now serving as the St. Johns Pub

After the exposition closed, the NCR Corporation donated it to the St. Johns Congregational Society of St. Johns, Oregon. On June 3, 1906, the National Cash Register Building was dedicated by Rev. Fred J. Warren of the St. Johns Congregational Society. Several ministers and parishioners of other Congregational churches were in attendance. The First Congregational Church of Portland donated stained glass windows that read "The Bible and the Cross and Crown". Another donation of $1,200 was given by the Congregational Church Building Society for the purposes of moving the structure.

By 1930, the building was occupied by the YWCA. It is currently used as a theater and pub by the McMenamins chain.
