= United Artists Theatre (Portland, Oregon) =

Former theater in Portland, Oregon, U.S.

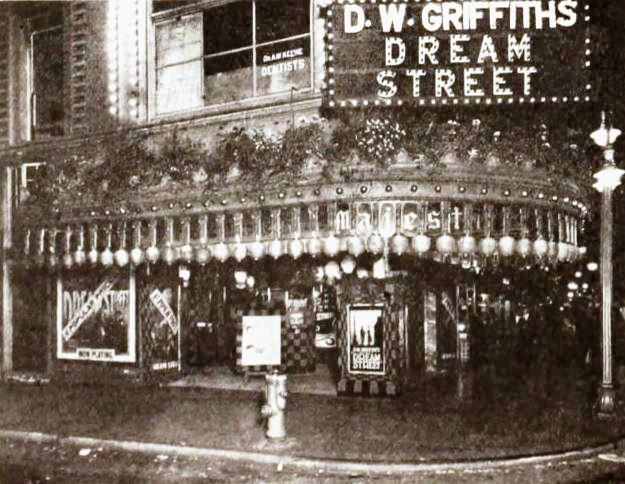
- Majestic Theatre marquee, showing D. W. Griffith's Dream Street in 1921
- Interactive map of United Artists Theatre
- Former names: Majestic Theatre
- Address: 739 SW Washington Street
- Location: Portland, Oregon, U.S.
- Coordinates: 45.5210°N 122.6797°W

Construction
- Opened: June 10, 1911
- Renovated: 1929
- Closed: 1955
- Demolished: 1957

United Artists Theatre, originally known as the Majestic Theatre, was a movie palace in Portland, Oregon, United States. It was Portland's first theater exclusively for movie screening.

== History ==
The Majestic Theatre opened as Portland's first "palace" for motion pictures on June 10, 1911, at the northeast corner of Southwest Park Avenue and Washington Street. It had 1,100 seats, and was originally owned by Edwin F. James.

In 1929, it was sold to J. J. Parker Theatres, who renovated it and changed its name to United Artists Theatre. The building was designed by Bennes and Herzog, who are also designed Portland's Hollywood Theatre. During the renovation, offices on the second floor were converted into a lounge measuring 40 feet (12 m) by 100 feet (30 m), and the interior was refitted. Mayor George Luis Baker spoke at its rededication ceremony on September 29, 1928.

The theatre closed in 1955 and was demolished in 1957. The site is now occupied by the Union Bank Tower (formerly known as the Bank of California building), built from 1967–1969.
