= Alhambra Theatre (Portland, Oregon) =

Building in Portland, Oregon, U.S.

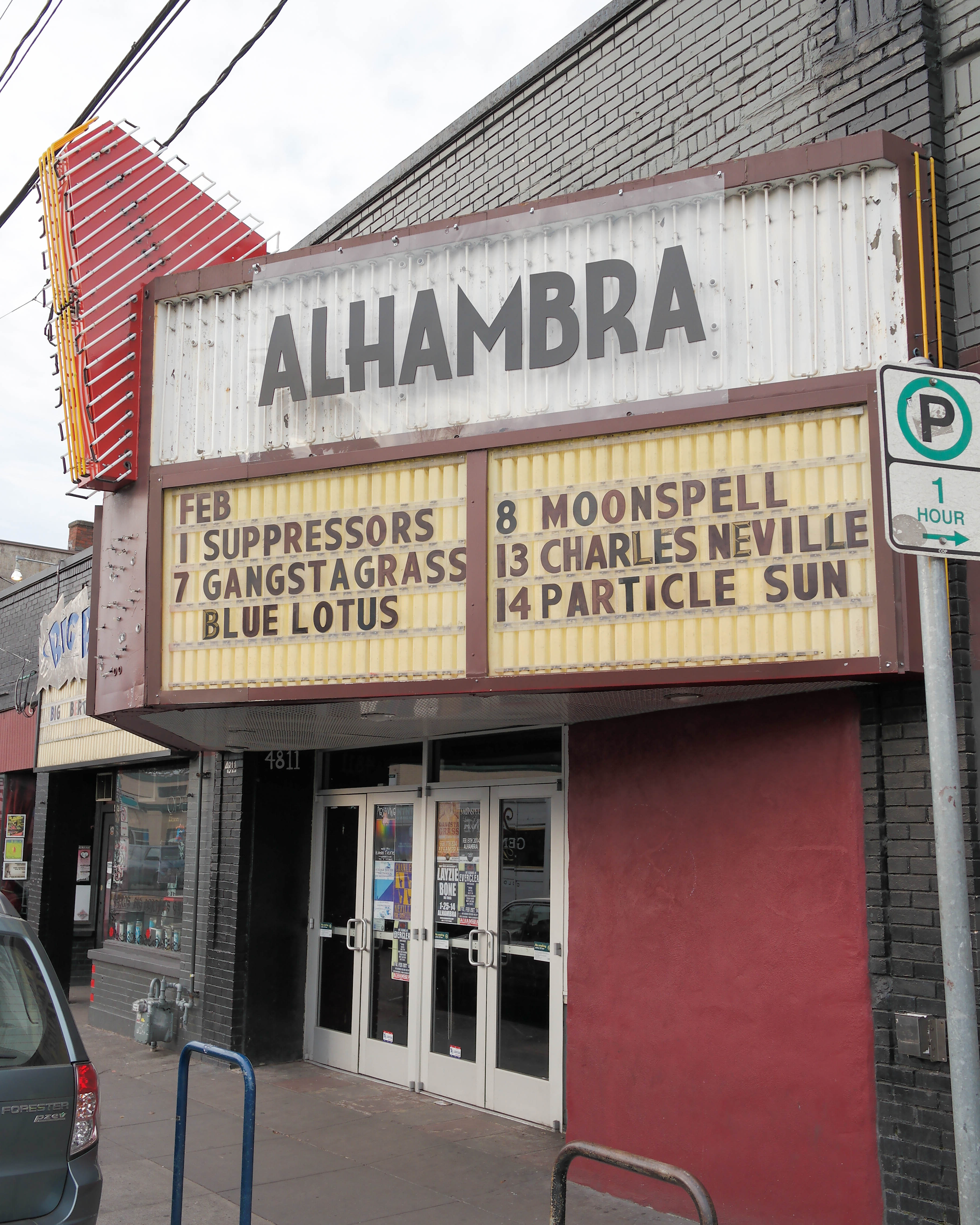
- The theater's front entrance in 2014
- Interactive map of Alhambra Theatre
- Former names: Sabala's; Mt. Tabor Legacy; Mt. Tabor Theater
- Location: Portland, Oregon, United States
- Coordinates: 45.512044°N 122.612855°W

Construction
- Opened: 1913

Alhambra Theatre is a theatre building in Portland, Oregon, in the United States. The venue was originally called the Alhambra upon its completion in 1913; subsequent names included Sabala's, the Mt. Tabor Legacy, and Mt. Tabor Theater. Alhambra Theatre was named after a now extinct volcano within Portland's city limits. In April 2016, the venue was permanently closed and subsequently became the QuarterWorld Arcade.

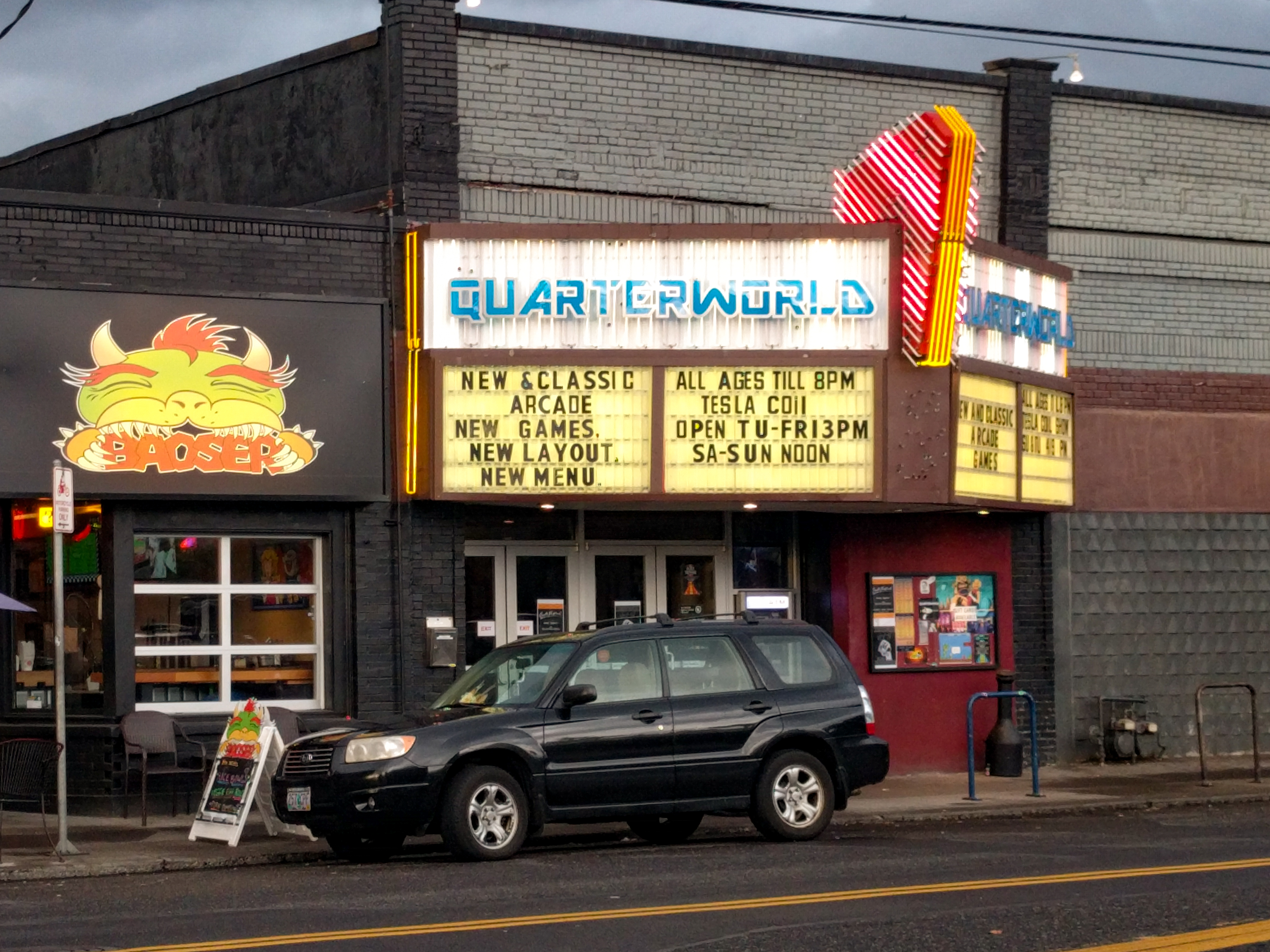
Quarterworld at Alhambra Theater Portland Oregon. Baoser, also owned by Quarterworld, at left

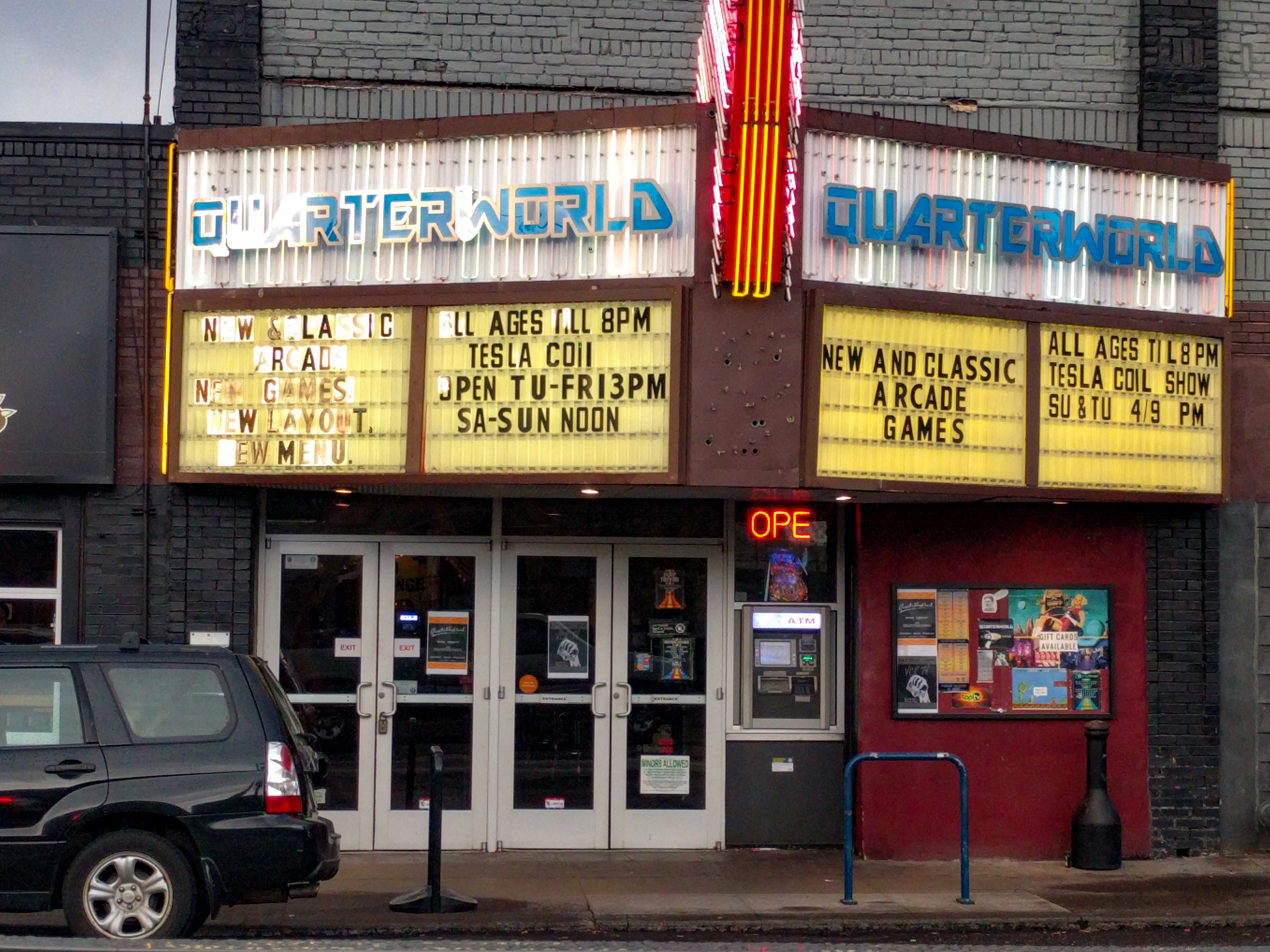
Quarterworld at Alhambra Theater Portland Oregon - quarter view
