= Playhouse Theatre (Portland, Oregon) =

Former theater in Portland, Oregon, U.S.

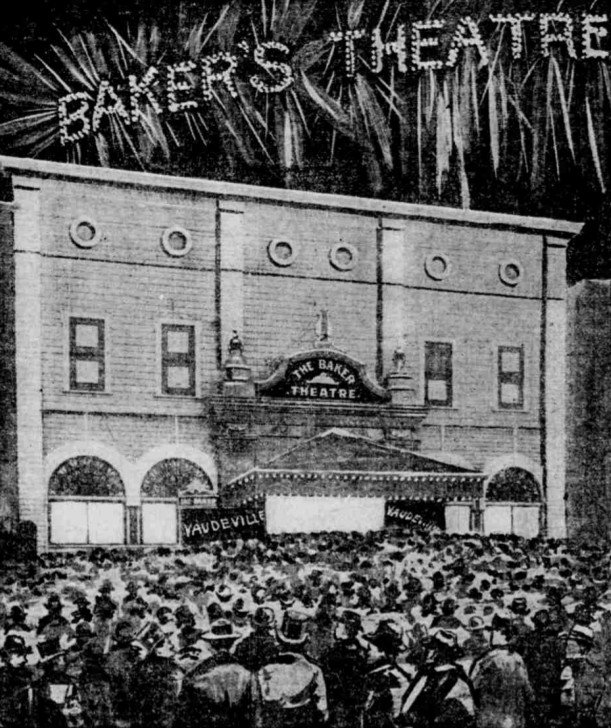
- Baker Theatre depicted in The Oregonian in 1902
- Interactive map of Playhouse Theatre
- Former names: Baker Theatre; Dufwin; Alcazar; Music Box; El Capitan
- Location: Portland, Oregon, United States
- Coordinates: 45°31′13.26″N 122°40′59.55″W
- Capacity: 1,200 (Baker Theatre)

Construction
- Opened: September 17, 1910
- Closed: June 1950 (theatre); October 1953 (building)
- Demolished: 1954

Playhouse Theatre, formerly known as Baker Theatre (also incorrectly Baker's Theatre), Dufwin, Alcazar, Music Box, and El Capitan, was a theatre in Portland, Oregon, in the United States.

== History ==
The venue opened as Baker Theatre, the city's second "palace", at the intersection of Southwest Morrison Street and 11th Avenue on September 17, 1910. Previously, the building served as a livery stable, and was built to house the Baker Players (operated by George Luis Baker). However, poor acoustics forced the venue to close shortly after opening and undergo a two-month-long redesign.

The theatre's original seating capacity was 1,200 people. Subsequent names for the venue included: Dufwin, Alcazar, Music Box, and El Capitan. Its name was changed to Playhouse Theatre in 1932; from then on, the venue mostly showed films. Playhouse closed in June 1950, and the building was used for church services and occasional stage events until finally closing in October 1953. The building was demolished in 1954.
