= Moreland Theater =

Movie theater in Portland, Oregon, U.S.

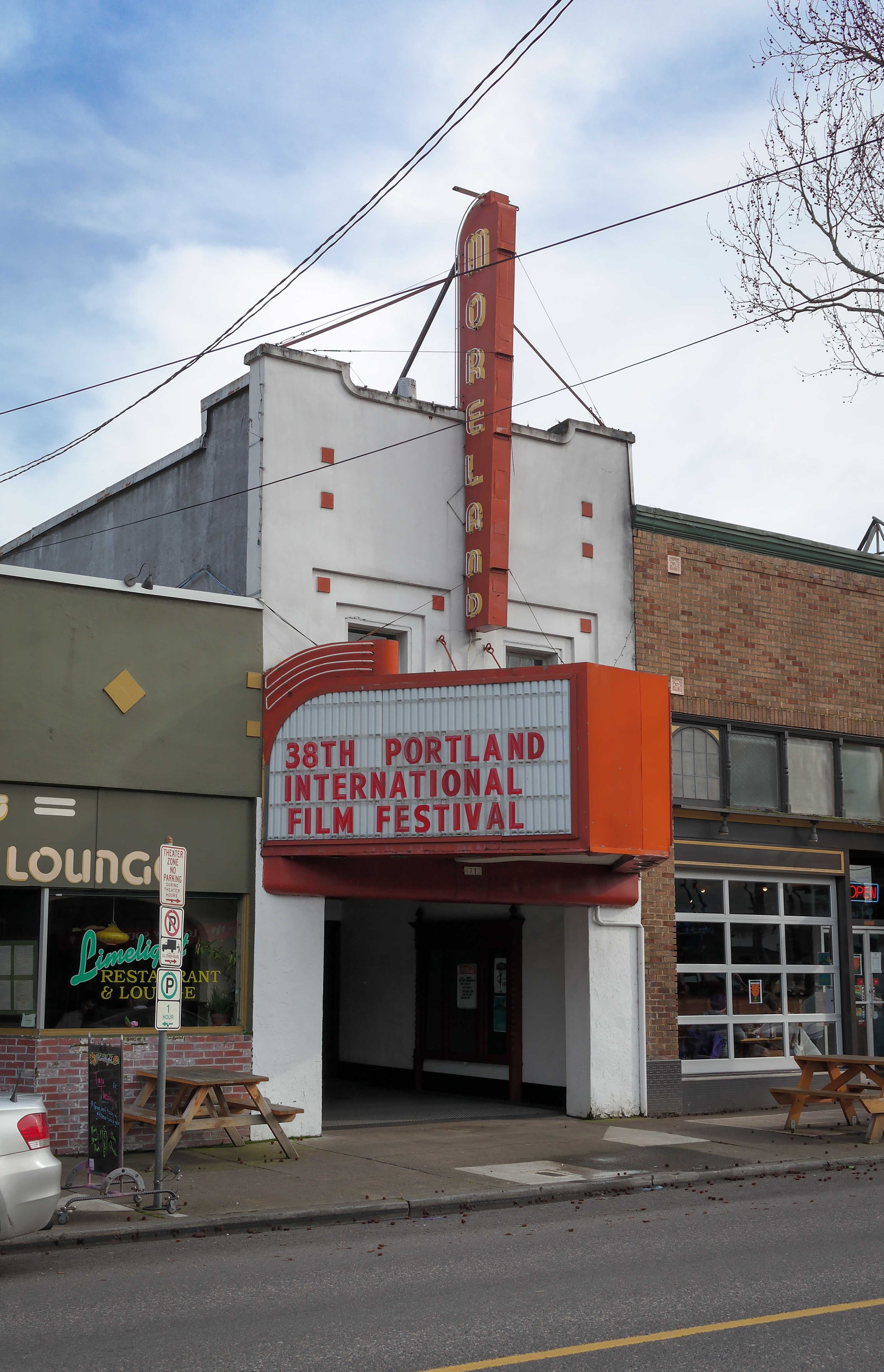
- The theater in February 2015
- Interactive map of Moreland Theater
- Address: 6712 SE Milwaukie Avenue; Portland, Oregon; United States
- Coordinates: 45.474179°N 122.648556°W

Construction
- Opened: September 10, 1925; 101 years ago
- Architects: Day Walter Hilborn or Thomas and Thomas

Website
- www.morelandtheater.com/index.php

Moreland Theater is a single-screen movie theater located in the Sellwood neighborhood of Portland, Oregon in the United States.

The theater was designed by Day Walter Hilborn or Thomas and Thomas (Oregon Public Broadcasting says the former, who designed other theaters in the region such as the Eltrym in Baker City, Oregon and Kiggins Theatre in Vancouver, Washington, while local archivists Gary Lacher and Steve Stone say the latter).

The theater opened on September 10, 1925 and initially hosted vaudeville acts and screened silent films. Moreland continues to screen first-run films.

Moreland remains one of Portland's few historic single-screen theaters. It has been included in walking tours of the Sellwood neighborhood.

The theater acquired its name from the geographic area once known as Moreland, named after local real estate developer Judge J.C. Moreland.
