= Avalon Theatre (Portland, Oregon) =

Theater in Portland, Oregon, U.S.

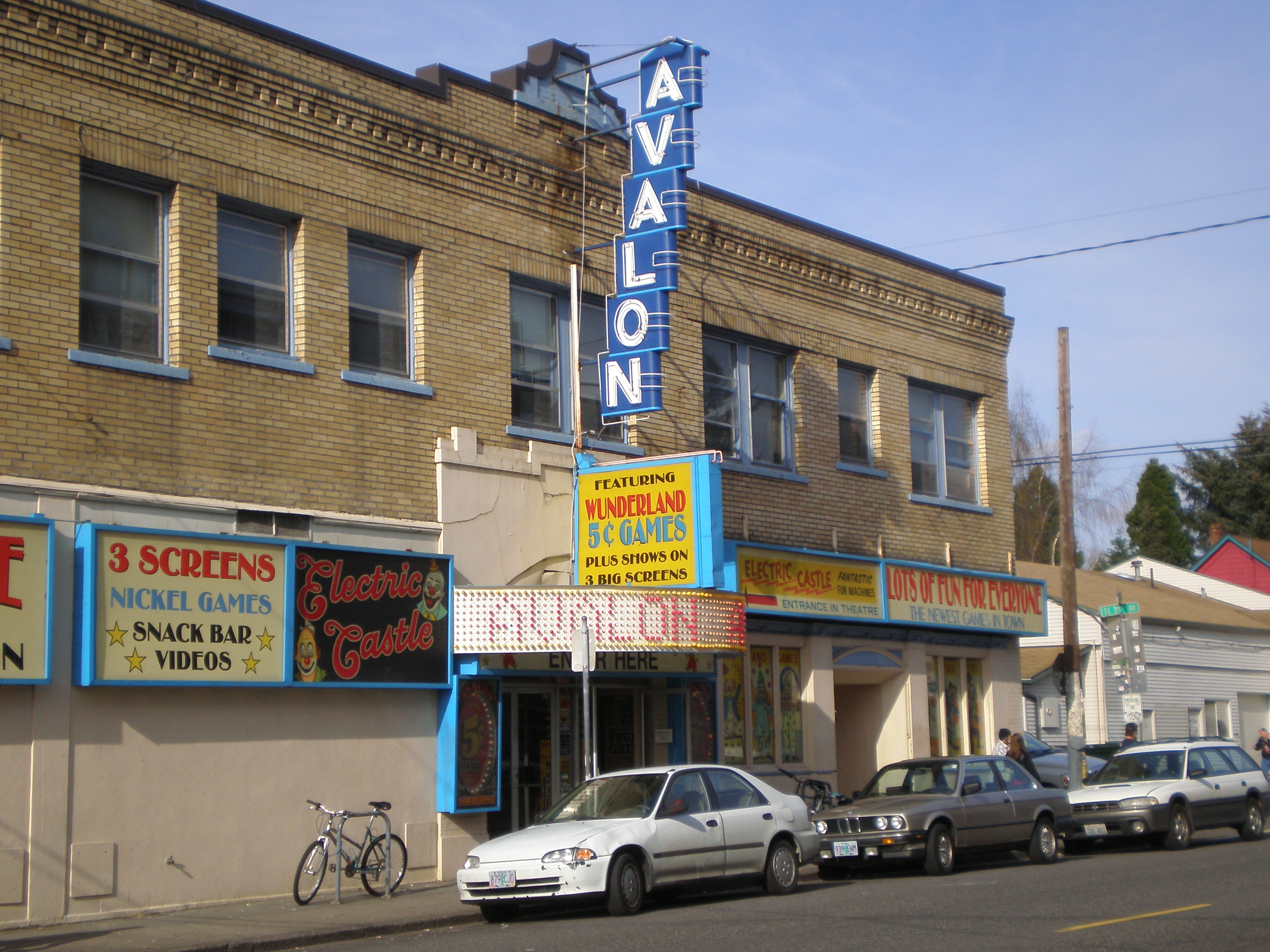
- The Avalon Theatre in 2011

- Location within Portland, Oregon

General information
- Architectural style: Art Deco
- Location: 3451 SE Belmont Street, Portland, Oregon, United States
- Coordinates: 45.5166°N 122.6285°W
- Opened: 1912

Avalon Theatre, established as the Sunnyside Theatre in 1912, is the oldest operating movie theater in Portland, Oregon, and is believed to be the state's oldest theater and the first with more than one screen.

== History ==
Located at the intersection of Southeast Belmont Street and 35th Avenue in the city's Sunnyside neighborhood, the location of the Avalon Theatre had been formerly used as a mortuary and later a brothel before being converted into a theatre in 1912, operating as the Sunnyside Theatre.

Known for showing second-run films on two screens and for low prices, the theater has an Art Deco design but Avalon's main feature is its classic nickel arcade, which was established in conjunction with the theatre in 1925. The establishment is operated by McKee Enterprises, who own the Wunderland arcade company which operates at the theatre. John McKee purchased the Avalon in 1964, and became the first cinema in Portland to operate with multiple screens.

In 2008, Portland Monthly named the Avalon the "Best Way to Stretch a Dollar" on their "Best of the City" list.

== See also ==
- Belmont, Portland, Oregon
