= Alberta Rose Theatre =

Theatre in Portland, Oregon, U.S.

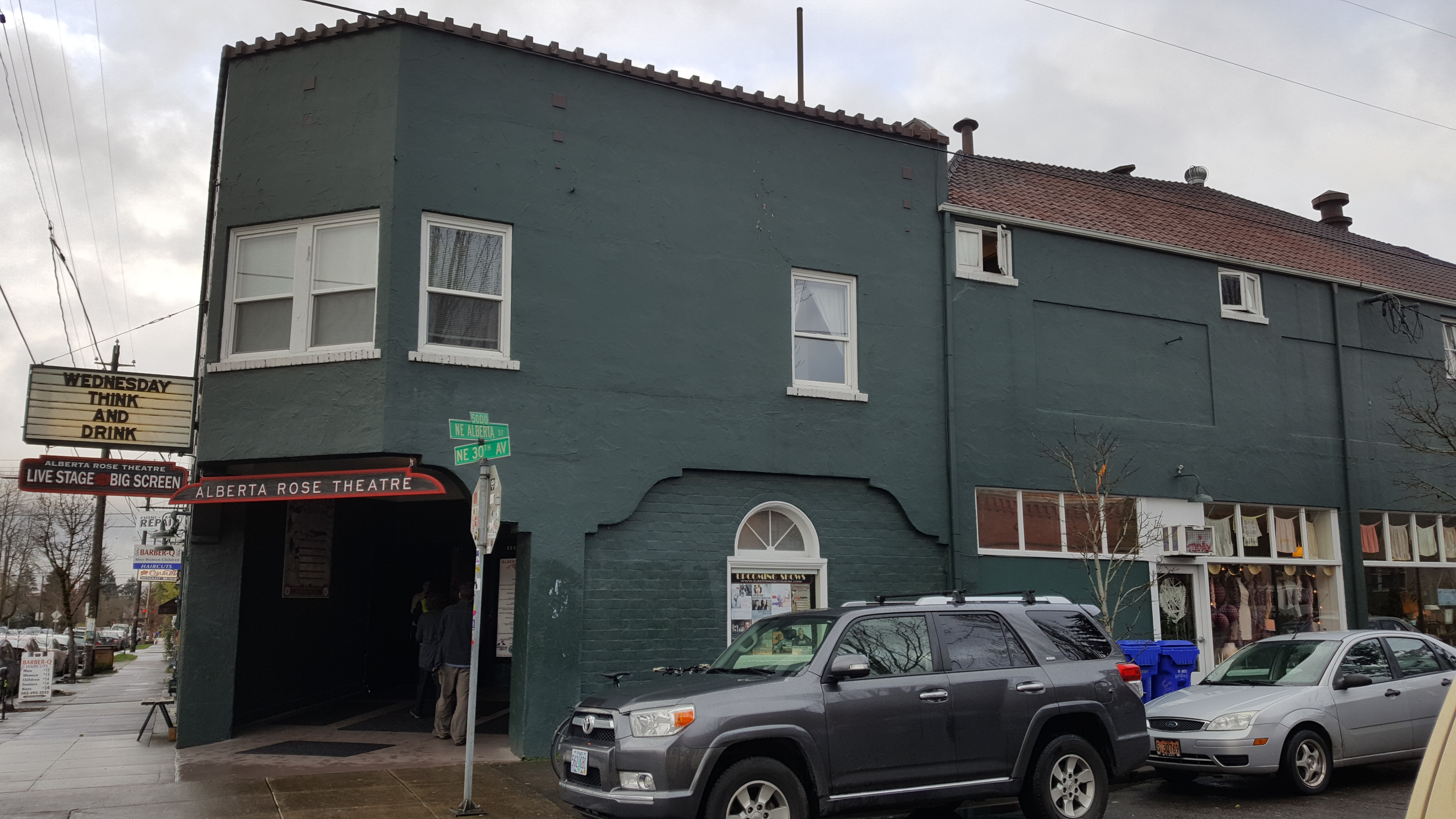
- The theatre's exterior, 2017
- Interactive map of Alberta Rose Theatre
- Former names: Alameda Cinema
- Address: 3000 Northeast Alberta Street
- Location: Portland, Oregon, U.S.
- Coordinates: 45.55892°N 122.63469°W

Website
- albertarosetheatre.com

Alberta Rose Theatre, formerly known as the Alameda Cinema, is an historic theatre in Portland, Oregon's Concordia neighborhood, in the United States.

== See also ==
- Alberta Arts District
