= Roseway Theater =

Historic theater in Portland, Oregon, U.S.

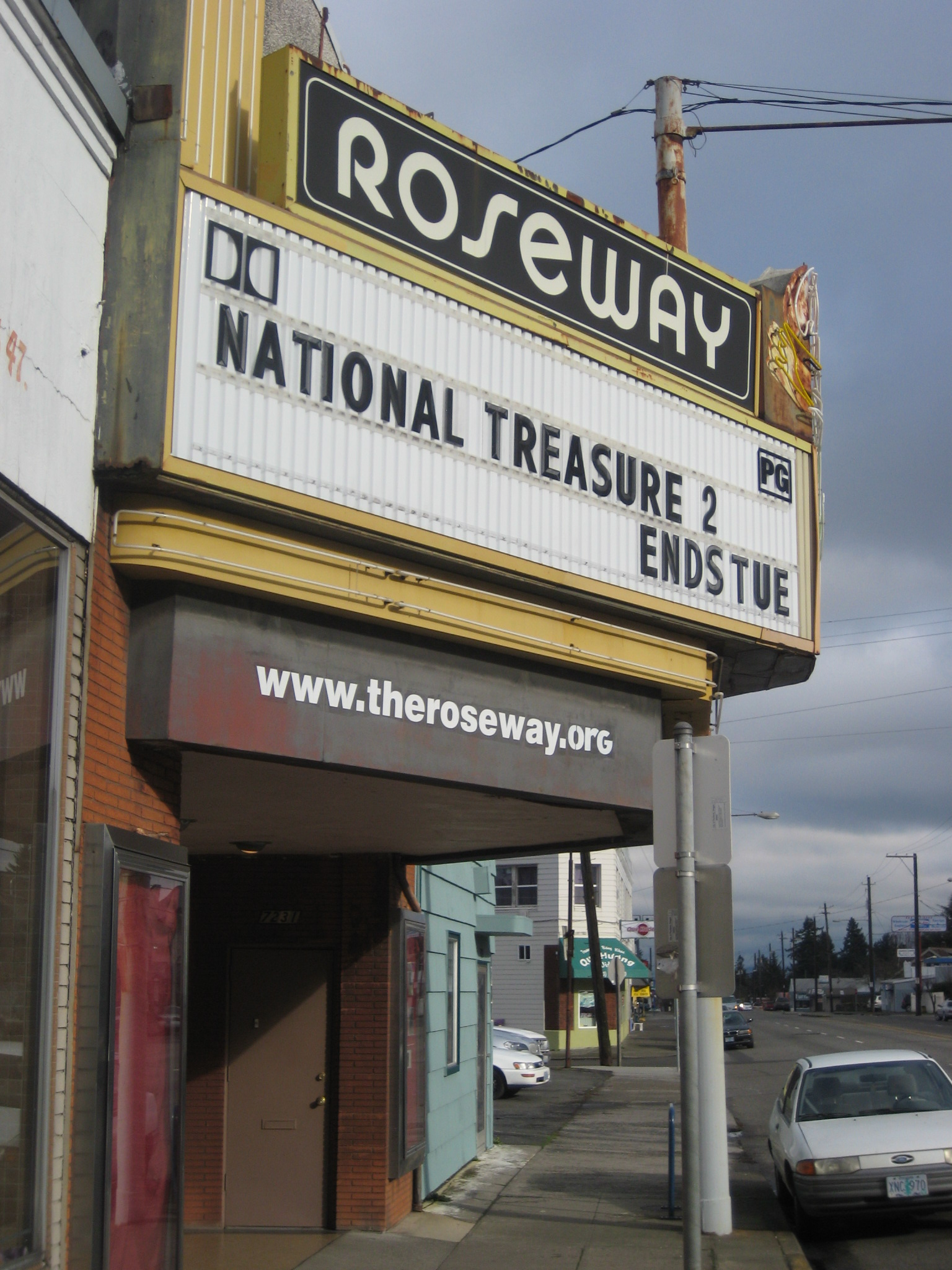
- The theater's exterior, 2008
- Interactive map of Roseway Theater
- Address: Portland, Oregon; U.S.
- Coordinates: 45.54872°N 122.58844°W
- Owner: Greg Wood
- Type: Theatre

Construction
- Closed: 2022
- Demolished: 2022

The Roseway Theater was a historic theater in northeast Portland, Oregon's Roseway neighborhood, in the United States, that operated for almost a century. The c. 1924 independent theater operated continually from 1925 to 2022, when it was destroyed by fire. Greg Wood had owned the Roseway since 2008.

In the early morning of August 6, 2022, an electrical fire started in the theater and the building subsequently sustained significant damage, with more than 80 firefighters called in to pour water through the burned roof and collapsed interior stairwells. Owner Greg Wood decided not to rebuild, but the theater's marquee, which survived the fire, was removed in December 2022 with plans to display it at the National Neon Sign Museum in The Dalles, Oregon.
