= Aladdin Theater (Portland, Oregon) =

Theater in Portland, Oregon

- Geller's Theatre (1927–1934)
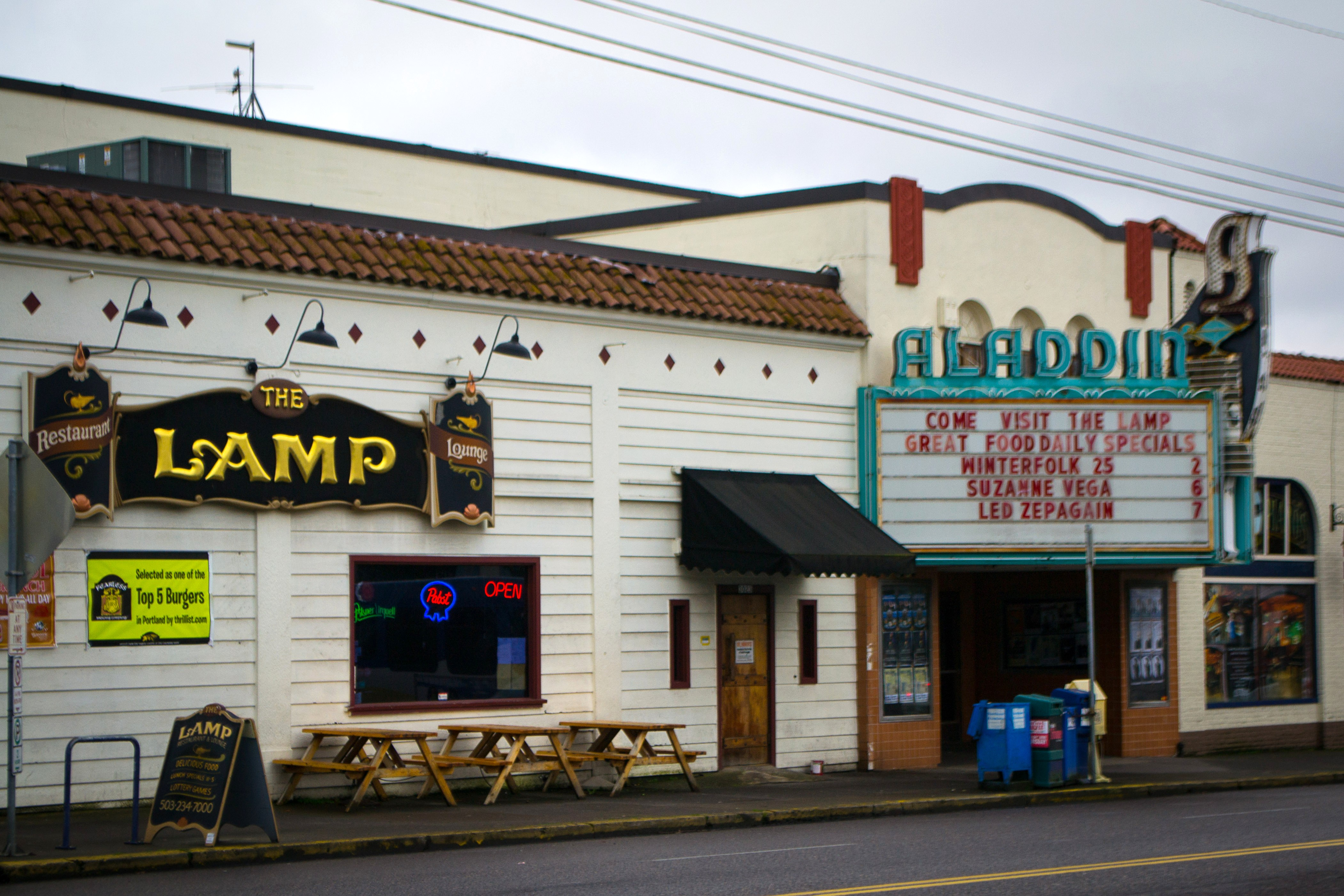
- The theater's exterior in 2013
- Interactive map of Aladdin Theater
- Address: 3107 SE Milwaukie Ave. Portland, Oregon; United States
- Coordinates: 45.500813°N 122.654371°W
- Owner: Mark Adler
- Capacity: 620
- Current use: Music venue

Construction
- Opened: December 25, 1927
- Architect: Edward A. Miller

Website
- www.aladdin-theater.com

Aladdin Theater is a theater in the Brooklyn neighborhood of southeast Portland, Oregon. It originally opened as a vaudeville house called Geller's Theatre on December 25 (Christmas Day), 1927. Its name was changed to Aladdin in 1934. Later the venue operated as a pornographic cinema for more than 30 years, screening the film Deep Throat for fourteen of them. It was revived as a classic movie and live music venue with a capacity of 620 in 1991.

== See also ==
- Culture of Portland, Oregon
