= 5th Avenue Cinema =

Movie theater in Portland, Oregon, U.S.

- Cine-Mini Theater
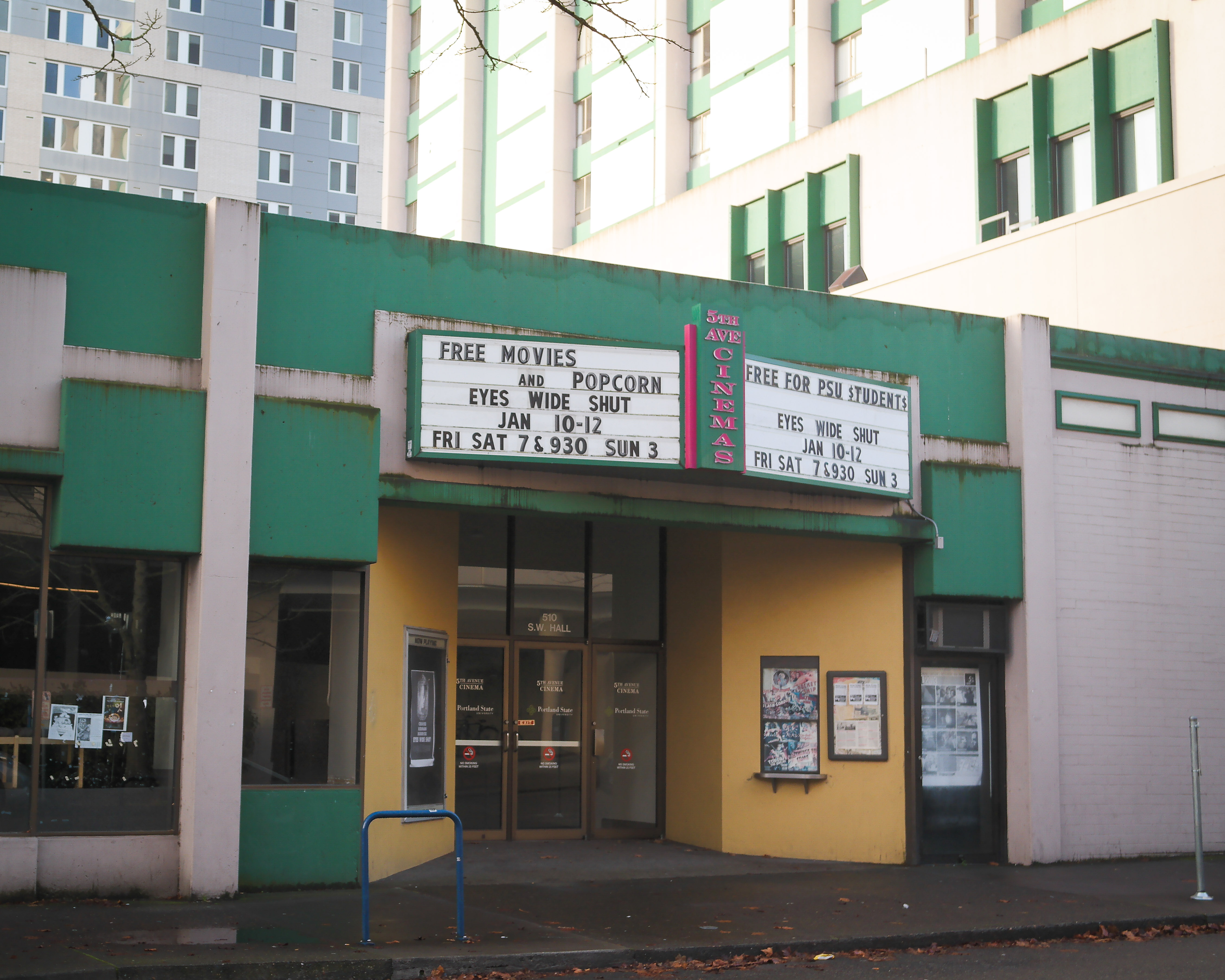
- The 5th Avenue Cinema in 2014
- Interactive map of 5th Avenue Cinema
- Address: 510 SW Hall Street; Portland, Oregon; United States
- Coordinates: 45.510078°N 122.682723°W
- Owner: Portland State University
- Operator: PSU Film Committee
- Capacity: 200
- Type: World

Construction
- Opened: 1970, Moyer Theaters
- Reopened: 1989, Portland State University
- Architect: Campbell Yost

Website
- www.5thavecinema.com

The 5th Avenue Cinema is a two-screen, 35-millimeter projection theater at 510 Southwest Hall Street in Portland, Oregon, in the United States, owned by Portland State University (PSU) and operated by the student-managed PSU Film Committee. Each term the committee selects a variety of films, often world cinema or art films, and screening is free to PSU students. The cinema is open to the public for a nominal fee.

== History ==
The cinema opened in October 1970, under the name Cine-Mini Theater in rented space formerly used by the Portland State University Bookstore. Larry Moyer, owner of Moyer Theaters and rival brother of Tom Moyer, believed that Portland was ready for an intimate, fully automated niche market movie house where the projector, house music, curtains, and house lights were automatically controlled.

The small theater was not a profitable first-run venue, however, and soon it began showing old movies and midnight movies, including the first public screening of "The Rocky Horror Picture Show" in 1975. The name was changed to 5th Avenue Cinema in 1973, although the entrance remained on Southwest Hall Street.

Almost from the beginning, the cinema worked with the PSU Film Committee to select programming that would appeal to students. An alliance with the Northwest Film Study Center followed, and the cinema even screened films during the annual Portland International Film Festival.

When Act III Cinemas purchased Moyer Theaters in the late 1980s, Portland State University accepted ownership of the 5th Avenue Cinema as a non-profit organization. The cinema is one of the few student operated theaters in the United States.
