= Laurelhurst Theater =

Movie theater in Portland, Oregon, U.S.

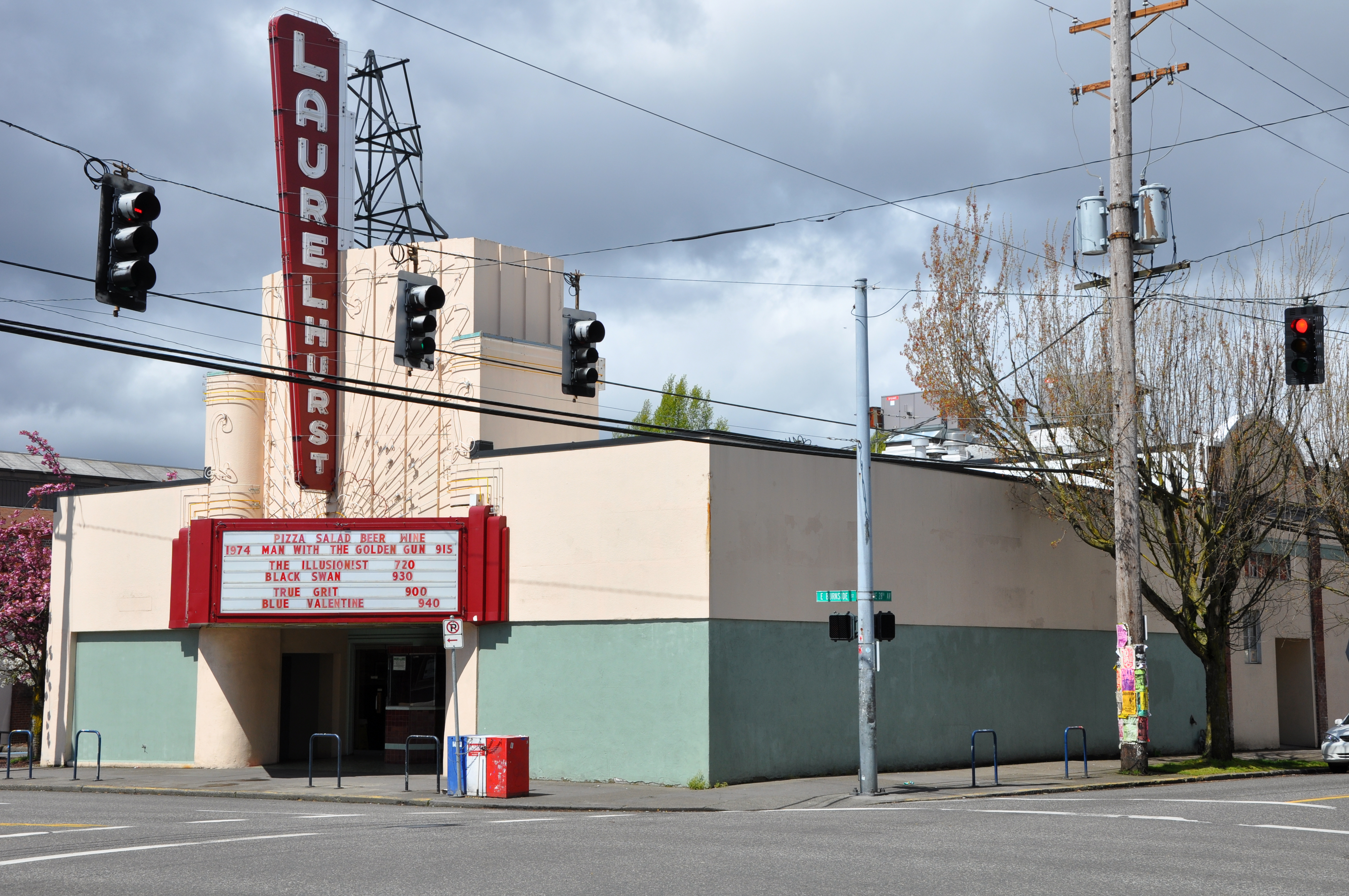
- The theater's exterior in 2011

- Location within Portland, Oregon
- Address: 2735 East Burnside Street; Portland, Oregon; United States
- Coordinates: 45.5229°N 122.6375°W
- Owner: Prescott Allen, Woody Wheeler

Construction
- Opened: 1923
- Architect: Charles W. Ertz

Website
- www.laurelhursttheater.com

Laurelhurst Theater is a movie theater located in the Kerns neighborhood in northeast Portland, Oregon. Known for showing first and second-run films and for serving food and beer, the theater was constructed in 1923 with an Art Deco design.

== History ==
The theater was built by Walter Tebbetts in 1923. Tebbetts later built the Hollywood Theatre (1926) and the Oriental Theatre (1927). In 1924, The Sunday Oregonian described the $30,000 theater as "one of the most up-to-date motion-picture houses in Portland's suburbs." Charles W. Ertz was the building's architect, and G.O. Garrison was the original owner of the theater, which had a $15,000 pipe organ and seated an audience of 700 people. The immediate neighborhood at the time included the central eastside trolley car barns of the Portland Railway, Light and Power Company and Kerns Public School, and the restricted residential neighborhood of Laurelhurst was nearby. The Sunday Oregonian published brief plot summaries for films scheduled to appear at the Laurelhurst. On March 15, 1925, the summaries for the week described Manhandled, starring Gloria Swanson; Monsieur Beaucaire, starring Rudolph Valentino, and North of 36, "the story of the first cattle drive and the fearless girl who showed the way."

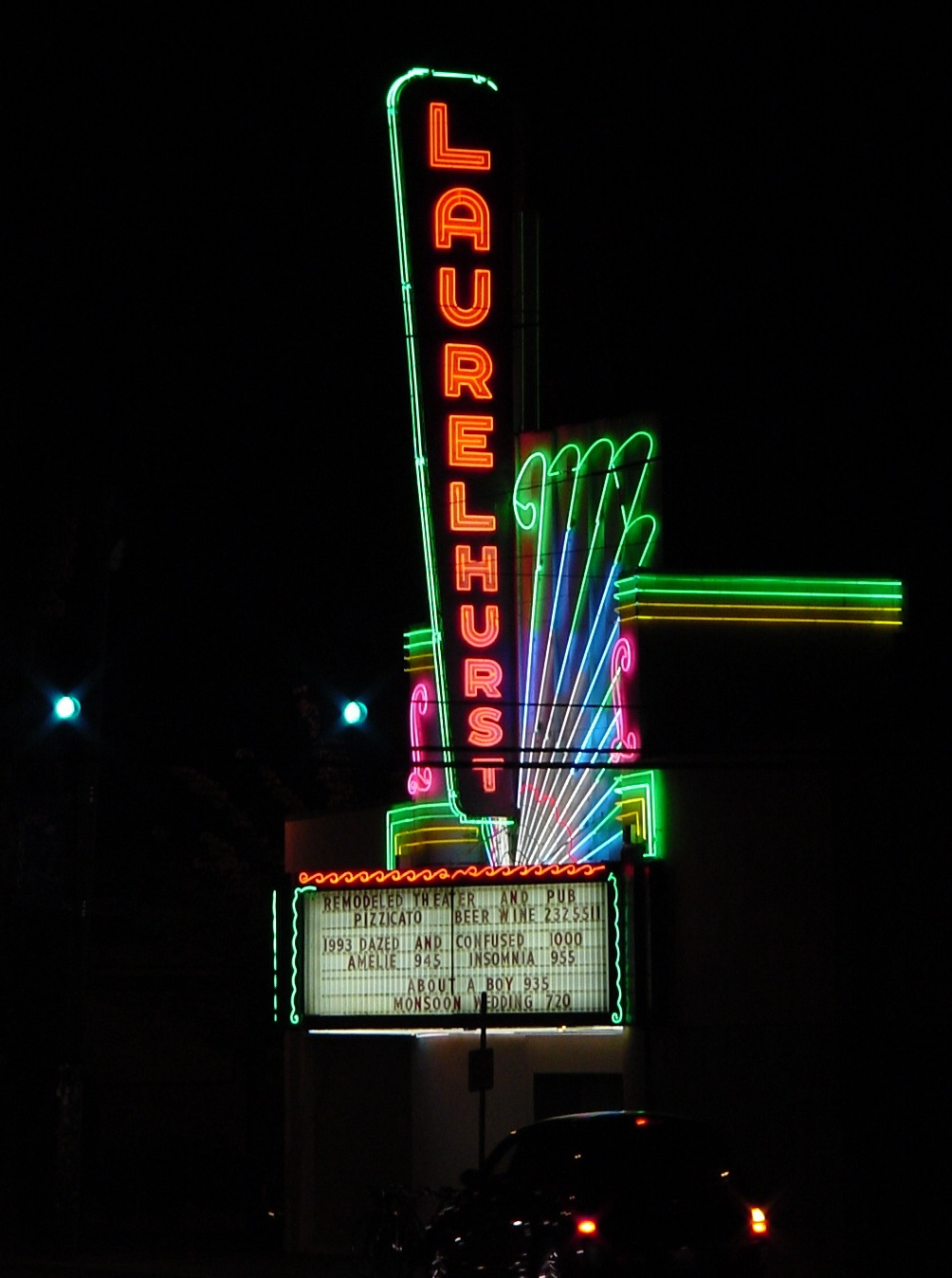
The theater's colorful neon sign and marquee, in 2002

The original theater had a single screen. Periodic renovations included one advertised in 1938 that promised "ultramodern appointments and surroundings ... sparkling and completely new". In 1949, the Laurelhurst closed briefly for another remodeling, and in 1953 management replaced the theater screen with an "ultra-wide curved screen." Eventual expansion to four viewing rooms with separate screens was not enough to compete successfully with the new multiplex theaters built elsewhere in Portland in the 1980s. Childhood friends Woody Wheeler and Prescott Allen purchased and renovated the theater again in 2000.

In the early 21st century, Laurelhurst Theater screens second-run films. It has a theme each month and a new feature film every week. Unlike typical first-run theaters, Laurelhurst serves food such as pizza, wraps, and salads, and local microbrewed beer. Willamette Week readers ranked Laurelhurst Theater first place in the following categories: "Best Place to See a Film" (2004), "Best Movie Theater (Local)" (2006), "Best Locally Owned Movie Theater" (2007), and "Best Cheap Date" (2009).

== Events ==
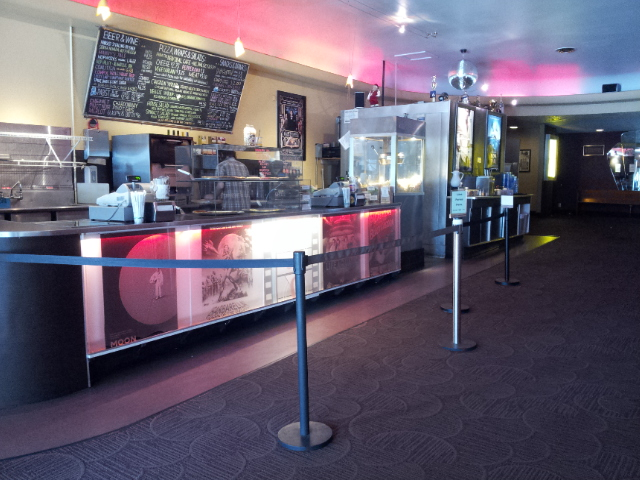
Interior in 2013

In its early years, the theater was sometimes the scene of social events other than film-viewing. In May 1938, for example, ceremonies at the Laurelhurst honored two children selected to be "prince" and "princess" representing the Buckman–Albina district in the annual Junior Portland Rose Festival. In November 1942, the theater sponsored a "victory party" for marathon swimmers from northeast Portland.

In 1947, an armed robber entered the Laurelhurst lobby during a late-evening show and forced the theater manager and another employee to give him $150. Ten minutes later and a few blocks from the Laurelhurst, police wounded the robber during an armed confrontation. Found guilty by a jury later that year, the robber was sentenced to 15 years in the state penitentiary. Six years later, a robber snatched a money sack with $100 from Walter E. Tebbetts as he walked from the theater to a bank. Two witnesses chased and caught the robber, who later confessed to the crime. In 1958, the theater suffered unspecified damage from smoke and water during a fire that destroyed a nearby plywood sales plant. Burglars caused more than $1,300 in damage to the Laurelhurst in 1967, when they tried and failed to gain access to the main contents of the theatre's safe by using explosives.
