= List of McMenamins properties =

McMenamins is a Portland, Oregon based chain of restaurants, brewpubs, hotels, theaters, music venues, and golf clubs with 56 locations of varying sizes in Oregon and Washington. McMenamins is notable for refurbishing historic properties for many of their locations.

McMenamins has a Passport Program where customers can collect stamps at each individual McMenamins location, including small bars and restaurants, and redeem them for points once certain stamps are collected.

== Restaurant, bars, and breweries ==
Property	Location	Founded (as McMenamins)	Notes
Mill Creek	Mill Creek, Washington	1995	
Queen Anne	Seattle, Washington	1995	
Six Arms	Seattle, Washington	1995	
Spar Café	Olympia, Washington	2007	
East Vancouver	Vancouver, Washington		
McMenamins on the Columbia	Vancouver, Washington		
Lighthouse Brewpub	Lincoln City, Oregon	1986	Oldest brewery on the Oregon Coast.
Roseburg Station Pub & Brewery	Roseburg, Oregon	1999	Originally a Southern Pacific Railroad depot, built in 1912.
East 19th Cafe	Eugene, Oregon	1992	
High Street Brewery & Cafe	Eugene, Oregon	1988	
North Bank Pub	Eugene, Oregon	2000	
Corvallis Pub	Corvallis, Oregon	1991	
McMenamins on Monroe	Corvallis, Oregon		
Thompson Brewery & Public House	Salem, Oregon	1984	
Boon's Treasury	Salem, Oregon	1998	Located in the historic Boon Brick Store.
Wilsonville Old Church & Pub	Wilsonville, Oregon		Partially located in a 1911 United Methodist Church.
Sherwood Public House	Sherwood, Oregon	1995	
West Linn Pub & Brewery	West Linn, Oregon	1992	
John Barleycorns	Tigard, Oregon	1996	Building was inspired by the Kakaako Pumping Station in Honolulu, Hawa'ii.
Greenway Pub	Tigard, Oregon	1988	
Murray & Allen	Beaverton, Oregon	1990	
Cedar Hills Pub	Beaverton, Oregon	1992	Relocated across the street in 2017.
Oak Hills Brewpub	Cedar Mill, Oregon		
Cornelius Pass Roadhouse	Hillsboro, Oregon	1986	Located at the historic Imbrie Farm. Contains four restaurants/bars: Elephant Bar, Imbrie Hall, Little White Shed, and Redwood Room.
Rock Creek Tavern	Hillsboro, Oregon	1995	
Raleigh Hills Pub	Portland, Oregon	1986	
Hillsdale Brewery & Public House	Portland, Oregon	1985	
Fulton Pub	Portland, Oregon	1988	
Market Street Pub	Portland, Oregon	1995	Visited by Vice President Al Gore in 1996.
Blue Moon Tavern & Grill	Portland, Oregon	1985	
Rams Head Pub	Portland, Oregon	1990	Located in the 1912 Campbell Hotel building.
McMenamin's Tavern & Pool	Portland, Oregon	1984	
Oregon City Pub	Oregon City, Oregon	1995	
Sunnyside Public House	Clackamas, Oregon	1989	
Highland Pub & Brewery	Gresham, Oregon	1988	
Mall 205	Portland, Oregon		
Barley Mill Pub	Portland, Oregon	1983	Original McMenamin's location.
Broadway Pub	Portland, Oregon	1990	
Chapel Pub	Portland, Oregon		Located in the 1932 Wilson–Chambers Mortuary building.

== Small bars and restaurants ==
Small bars and restaurants are located inside of hotels and select larger venues.

Name	Part of
New Tourist Bar	Olympic Club Hotel
Olympic Club Pub	Olympic Club
Theater Bar	Anderson School
Nui Nui	Anderson School
The Principal's Office	Anderson School
Tavern on the Square	Anderson School
The Market	Anderson School
The Shed	Anderson School
The Woodshop	Anderson School
Brewery Tasting Room & Bottle Shop	Elks Temple
Doc's Bar	Elks Temple
McMenamins Pub at Elks Temple	Elks Temple
Spanish Bar	Elks Temple
The Old Hangout	Elks Temple
The Vault	Elks Temple
Ahles Point Cabin	Kalama Harbor Lodge
Cloud Bar	Kalama Harbor Lodge
Love Bar	Kalama Harbor Lodge
Harbor Lodge Market	Kalama Harbor Lodge
Harbor Lounge	Kalama Harbor Lodge
McMenamins Pub at Kalama Harbor Lodge	Kalama Harbor Lodge
Pot Bunker Bar	Gearhart Hotel
Sand Bar	Gearhart Hotel
Sand Trap Pub	Gearhart Hotel
Broom Closet	Old St. Francis School
Fireside Bar	Old St. Francis School
O'Kane's	Old St. Francis School
Old St. Francis Pub	Old St. Francis School
Old St. Francis School Theater Bar	Old St. Francis School
Carter the Great Bar	Hotel Oregon
Cellar Bar	Hotel Oregon
McMenamins Pub at Hotel Oregon	Hotel Oregon
Rooftop Bar	Hotel Oregon
Billy Scott Bar	Grand Lodge
Bob's Bar	Grand Lodge
Doctor's Office Bar	Grand Lodge
Ironwork Grill	Grand Lodge
Pat's Corner	Grand Lodge
Al's Den	Crystal Hotel
Hal's Cafe	Crystal Hotel
Ringler's Annex	Crystal Hotel
Ringler's Pub	Crystal Ballroom
Black Rabbit House	Edgefield
Black Rabbit Restaurant & Bar	Edgefield
Distillery Bar	Edgefield
Gift Shop & Espresso Bar	Edgefield
Jerry's Ice House	Edgefield
Little Red Shed	Edgefield
Loading Dock Grill	Edgefield
Lucky Staehly's Pool Bar	Edgefield
Power Station Pub	Edgefield
Tea House	Edgefield
Winery Tasting Room	Edgefield
Back Stage Bar	Bagdad Theatre
Bagdad Pub	Bagdad Theatre
Greater Trumps	Bagdad Theatre
St. Johns Theater Pub	St. Johns Theater
White Eagle Saloon	White Eagle Saloon & Hotel
Boiler Room	Kennedy School
Courtyard Restaurant	Kennedy School
Cypress Room	Kennedy School
Detention Bar	Kennedy School
Honors Bar	Kennedy School
Kennedy School Theater Bar	Kennedy School

== Hotels ==
Thumbnail	Property	Location	Founded (as McMenamins)	Notes
	Anderson School	Bothell, Washington	2010	Located in a 1932 former middle school.
	Elks Temple	Tacoma, Washington	2019	Located in a 1916 former Benevolent and Protective Order of Elks Temple.
	Olympic Club	Centralia, Washington	1996	Originally opened in 1908 as the Oxford Hotel. Officially opened as a McMenamins property in 2002.
	Kalama Harbor Lodge	Kalama, Washington	2018	
	Gearhart Hotel	Gearhart, Oregon	2001	
	Old St. Francis School	Bend, Oregon	2004	Located in a 1925 former Catholic school.
	Hotel Oregon	McMinnville, Oregon	1999	Originally opened in 1905 as the Hotel Elberton.
	Grand Lodge	Forest Grove, Oregon	2000	Located in a 1920s former Freemasonic Grand Lodge for Oregon. A new Grand Lodge was built next door and this site was sold to McMenamins in 1999.
	Crystal Hotel	Portland, Oregon	2011	Originally opened in 1911 as the Hotel Alma.
	Edgefield	Troutdale, Oregon	1990	Located on the former Multnomah County Poor Farm. established in 1911. At 74 acres, Edgefield is the largest of all McMenamin's properties.
	White Eagle Saloon & Hotel	Portland, Oregon		Located in the 1905 Hryszko Brothers Building.
	Kennedy School	Portland, Oregon	1997	Located in the 1915 former John D. Kennedy Elementary School.

== Movie theaters ==
Property	Location	Founded (as McMenamins)
Anderson School Theater	Bothell, Washington	2010
Bagdad Theatre	Portland, Oregon	1991
Grand Lodge Theater	Forest Grove, Oregon	2000
Kennedy School Theater	Portland, Oregon	1997
Old St. Francis Theater	Bend, Oregon	2004
Olympic Club Theater	Centralia, Washington	
Power Station Theater	Troutdale, Oregon	1990
St. Johns Theater	Portland, Oregon	1998

== Music venues ==
Property	Location	Founded (as McMenamins)	Notes
Crystal Ballroom	Portland, Oregon	1997	Located in the 1914 Ringler's Cotillion Hall.
Mission Theater and Pub	Portland, Oregon	1987	Located in the 1913 Swedish Evangelical Mission Covenant Church. Used as a movie theater from 1987 until the early 2020s.

== Golf courses ==
Property	Location	Founded (as McMenamins)	Notes
Gearhart Golf Links	Gearhart, Oregon	2001	Built in 1892, Gearhart Golf Links is the oldest golf course in Oregon and west of the Mississippi River.
Edgefield Golf Course	Troutdale, Oregon		

== Additional properties ==
Property	Location	Founded (as McMenamins)	Notes
23rd Avenue Bottle Shop	Portland, Oregon	1985	Retail store.
McMenamins Coffee Roasters	Portland, Oregon	2001	Coffee roasting facility.
