= Reportedly haunted locations in Oregon =

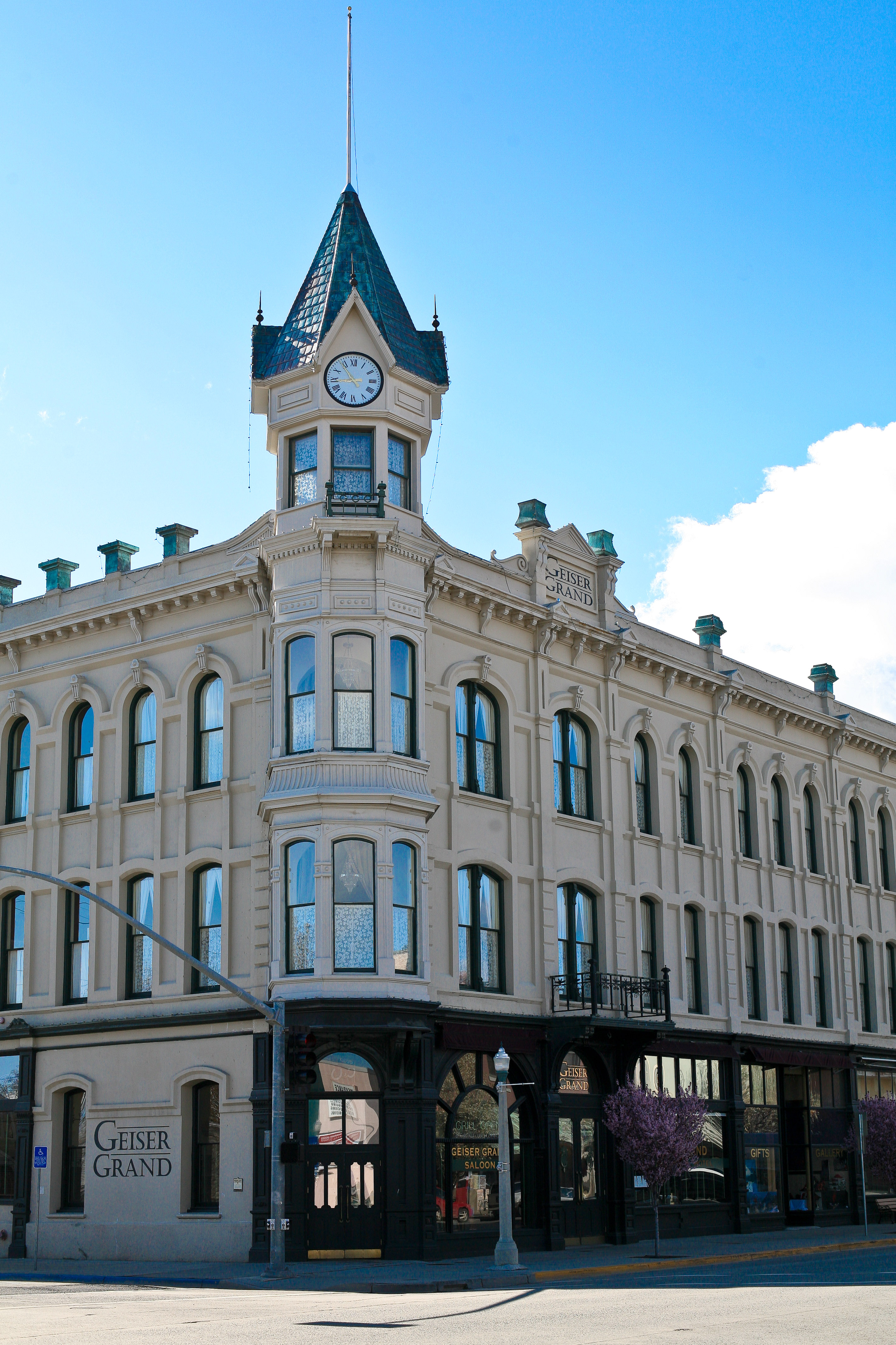
The Geiser Grand Hotel in Baker City is one of the state's many reportedly haunted locations

There are a number of widely reported haunted locations in the state of Oregon in the United States. Many reported hauntings in Oregon are linked to such historic places as the Oregon Trail and early coastal communities. Portland, the state's largest city and metropolitan area, was considered one of the most dangerous port cities in the world at the turn of the 20th century. Its gritty history includes many locations alleged or reported to be haunted. In 2012, USA Today named Portland among the top ten most haunted cities in the United States.

Reportedly haunted locales in Portland include the Bagdad Theater, a vaudeville theater built by Universal Studios in 1927, which is reportedly haunted by a maintenance man who committed suicide in the building; Pittock Mansion, a mansion overlooking the city that is reportedly haunted by its original owners; the Roseland Theater, a former church and music venue that is haunted by a club promoter who was murdered there; and, perhaps most widely reported, the city's Shanghai tunnels, made up of various passages that run beneath the streets of Northwest Portland that were used to smuggle prostitutes and sailors onto ships in the port, where they were often sold into slavery or forced labor.

Other locations alleged to be haunted include the Hot Lake Hotel in Union County; the Multnomah County Poor Farm in Troutdale; Rhododendron Village, a stop along the Oregon Trail near Mount Hood; and the Welches Roadhouse, where a pregnant woman jumped to her death.

== Northeast ==
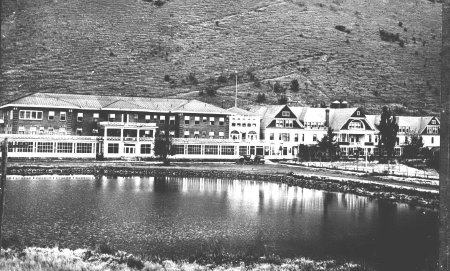
Hot Lake Hotel circa 1920s, located in Union County

| Place | Location | Background | Refs. |
|---|---|---|---|
| Geiser Grand Hotel | Baker City | The hotel is reportedly haunted by various residents and persons who died there. | |
| Granite | Grant County | This ghost town is reputed to be home to supernatural activity. | |
| Hot Lake Hotel | Hot Lake | Established in 1864, this hotel, located along thermal hot springs, also served as a sanatorium and experimental medical facility, of which fire claimed half of the building in 1934. The countless deaths that occurred there are cited as the source of alleged paranormal activity. It was featured on the series The Scariest Places on Earth in 2001. | |
| Sumpter Valley Gold Dredge | Sumpter | This historic gold dredge is allegedly haunted by Joe Bush, a ghost who allegedly causes the sound of disembodied footsteps. | |

== Northwest ==
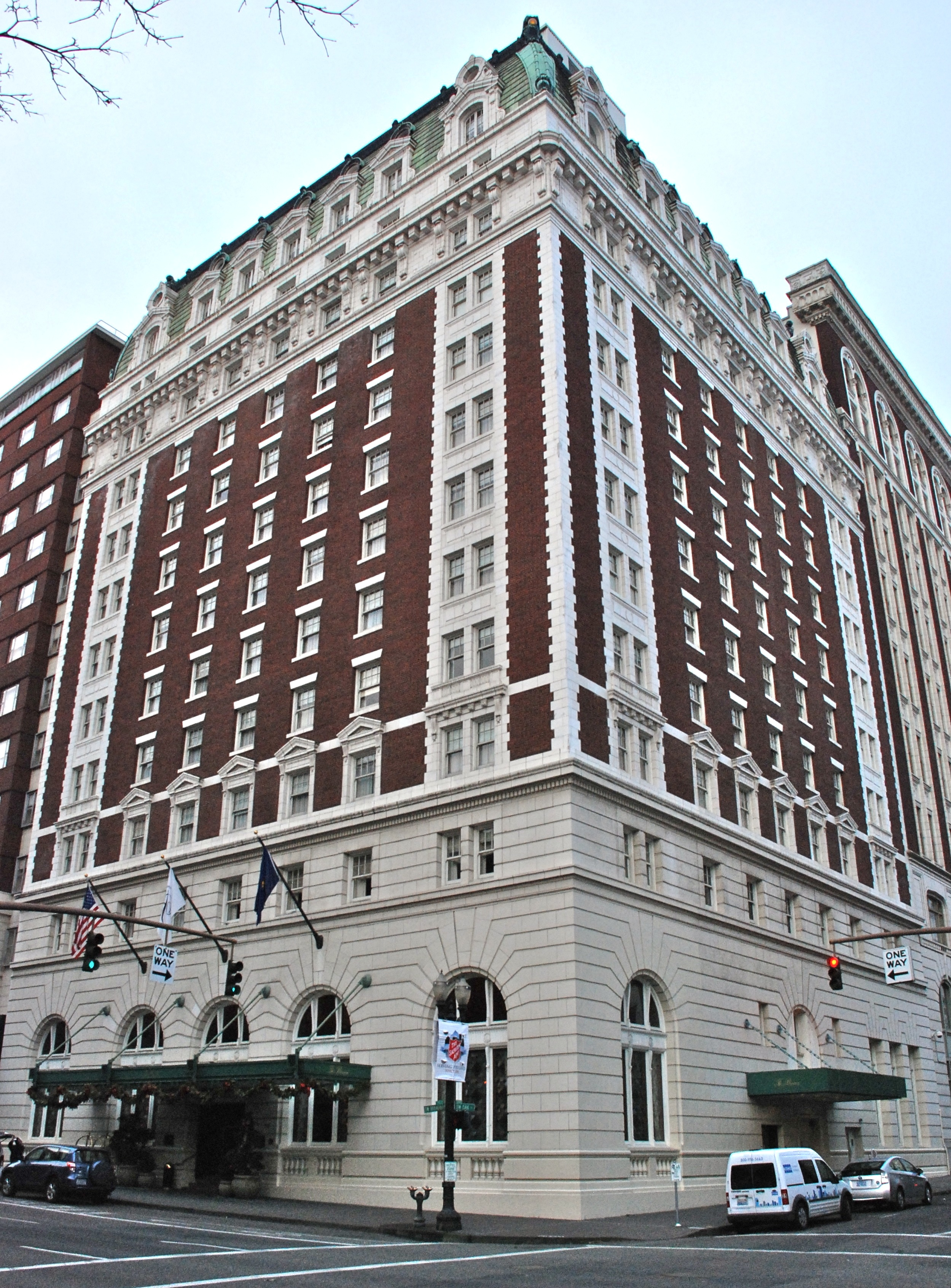
The Benson Hotel in downtown Portland, Oregon, is reportedly haunted by its original owner

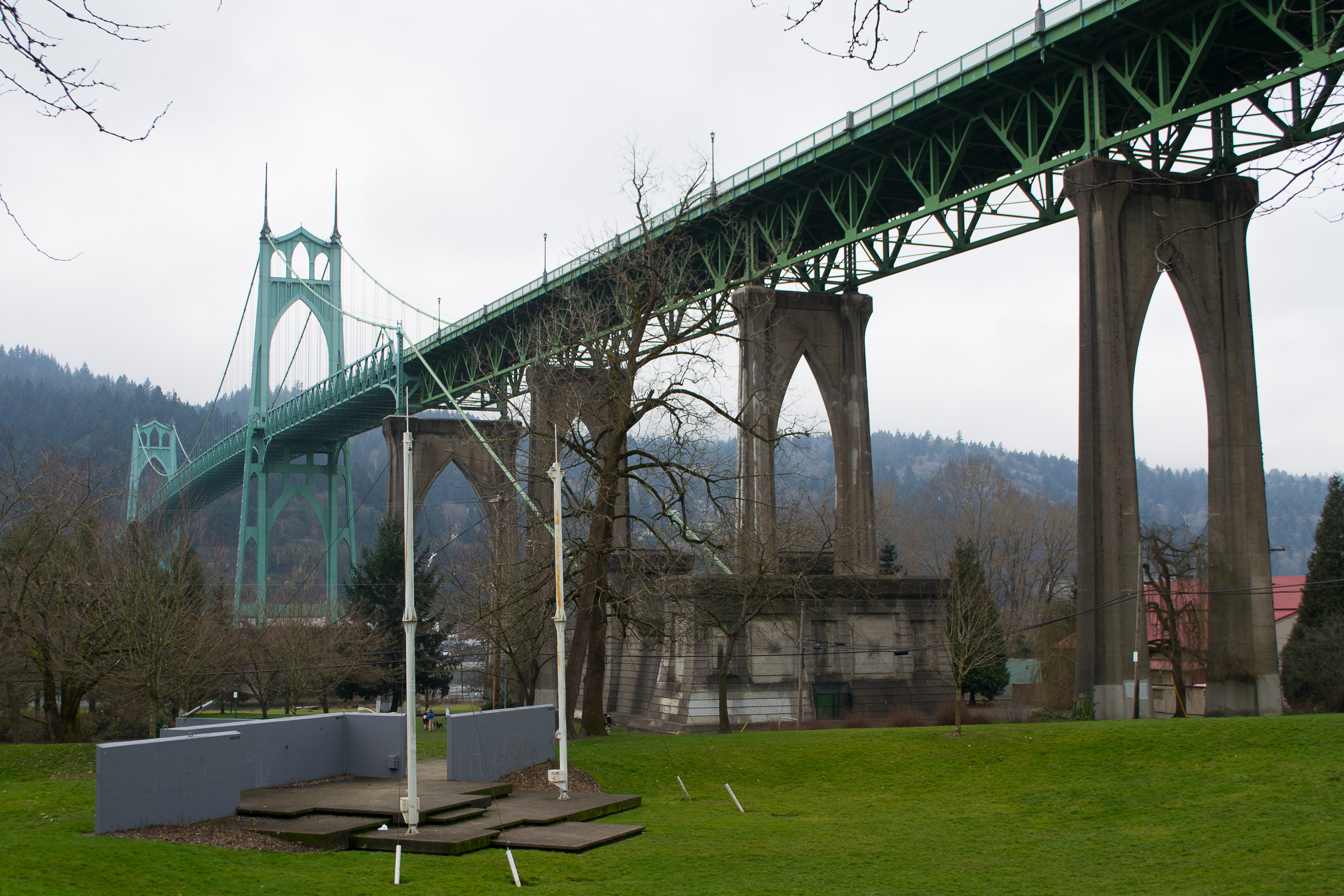
Cathedral Park is said to be haunted by Thelma Taylor, a teenager who was murdered there in 1949

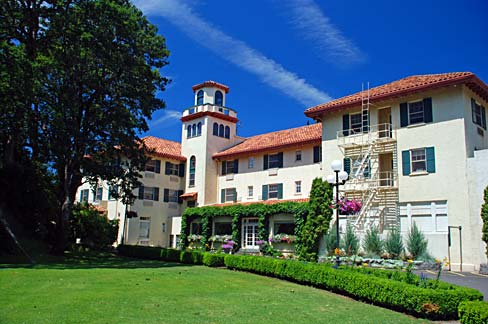
The Columbia Gorge Hotel is reputedly the site of paranormal activity

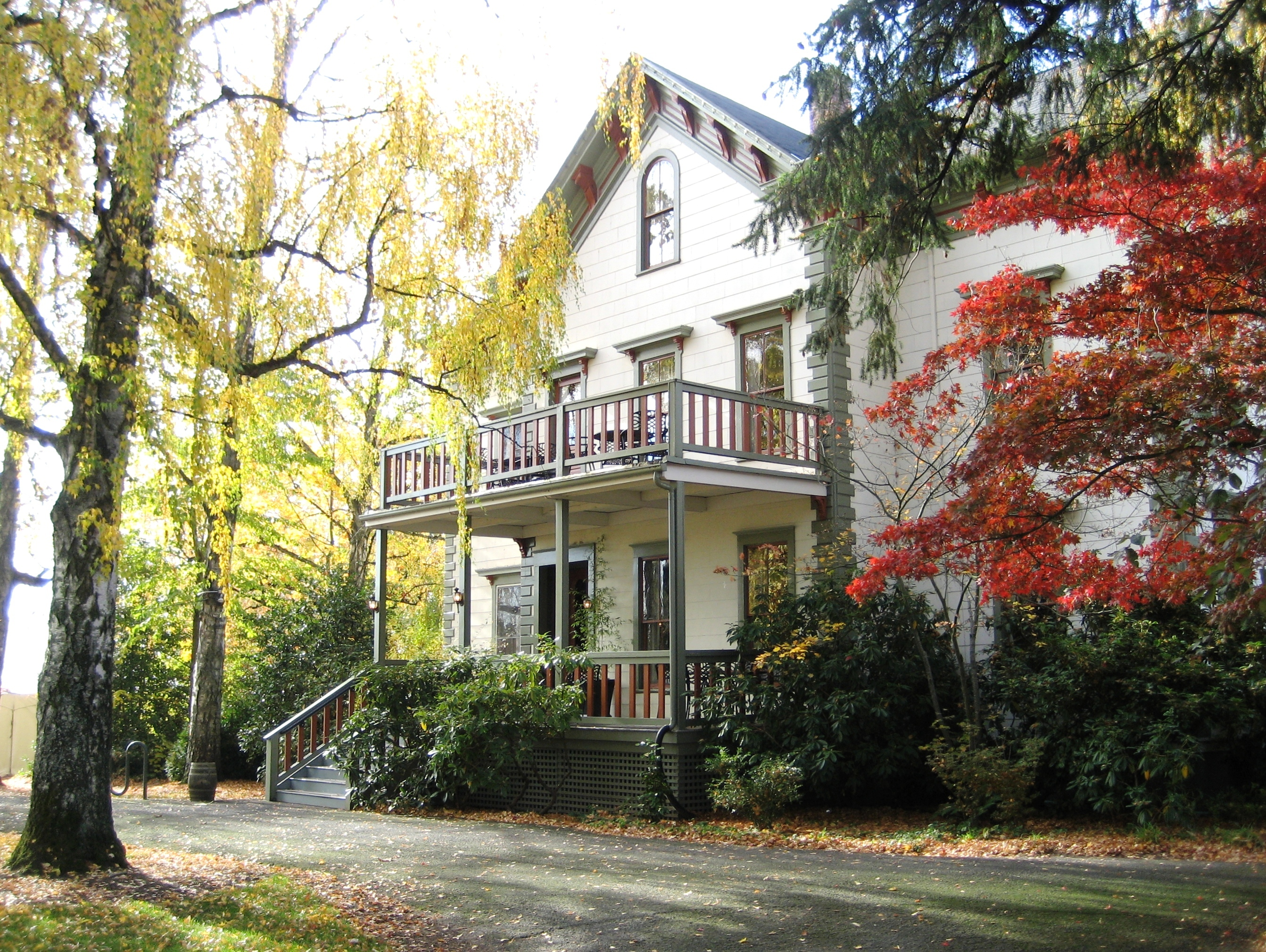
Imbrie Farm is allegedly haunted by family members of its namesake who died there

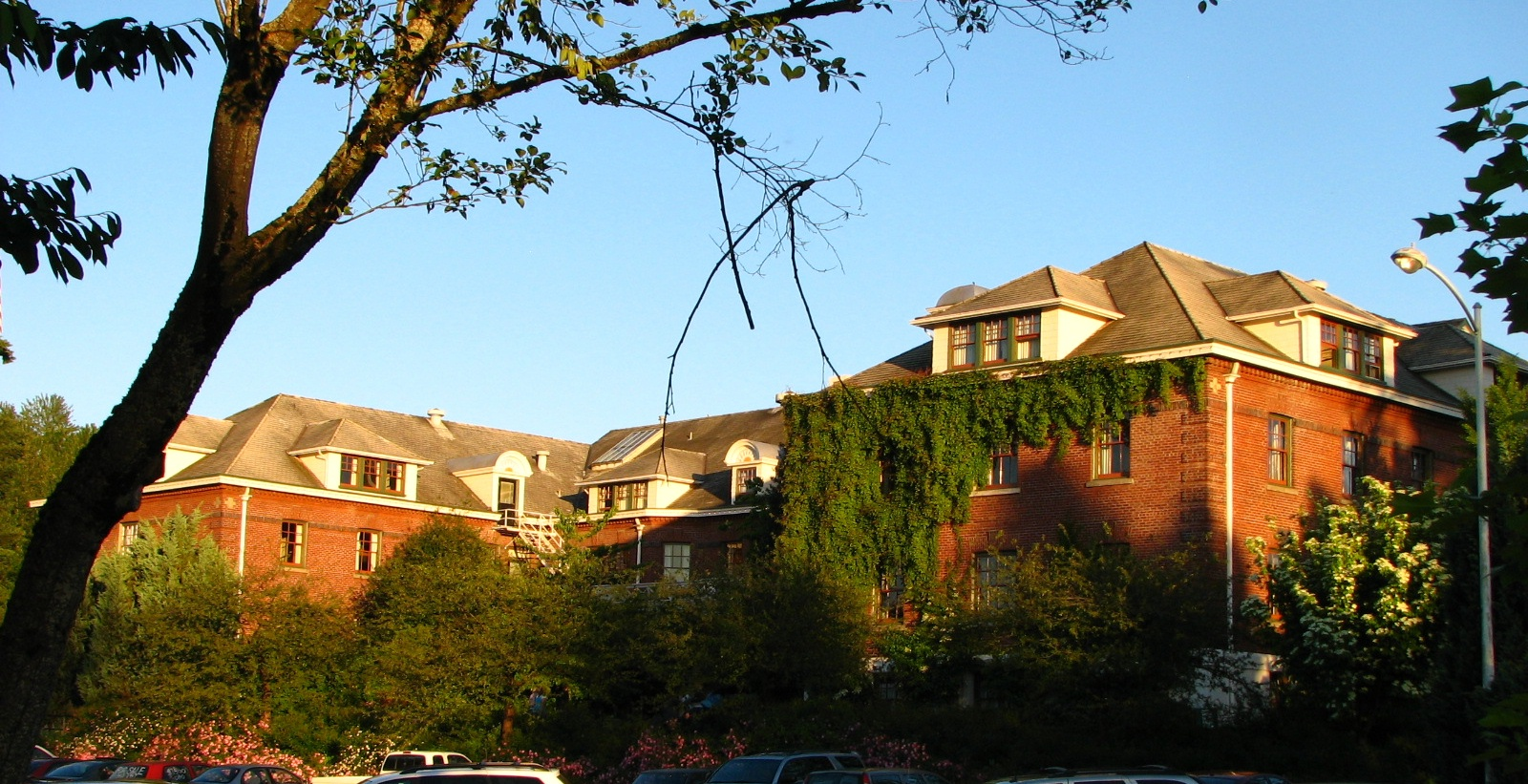
Multnomah County Poor Farm, which now operates as restaurant, hotel, and brewery, is said to be haunted by numerous ghosts; the property also contains countless unmarked graves

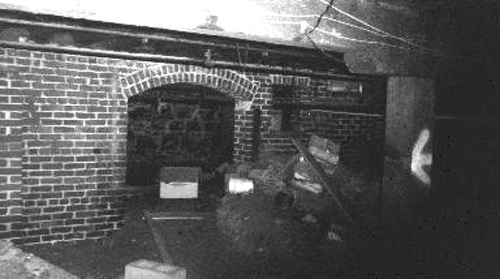
The Old Portland Underground beneath the Northwest district and downtown Portland are reported to be the most haunted location in the entire state

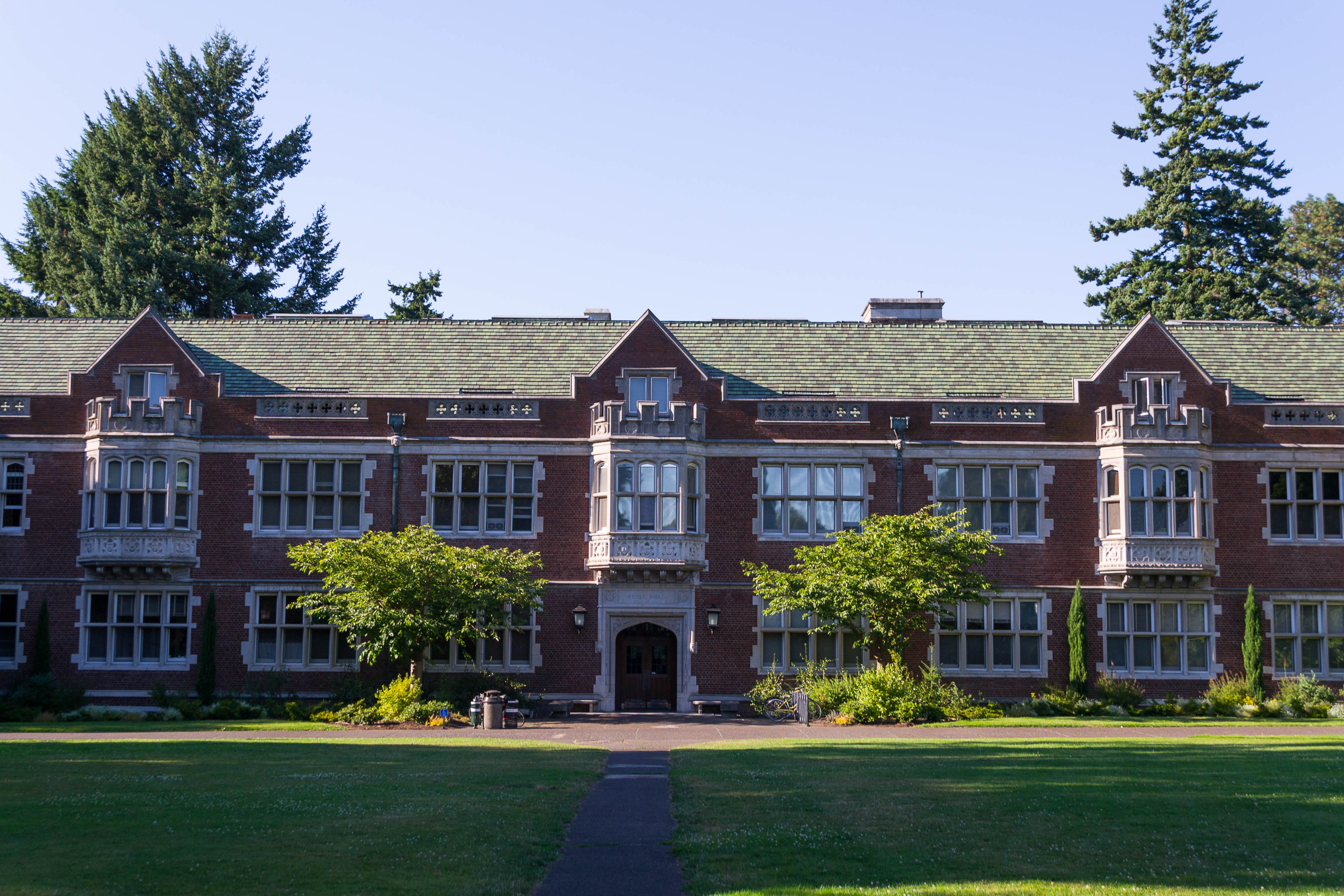
Reed College is reported to have hauntings in one of the college's residence halls

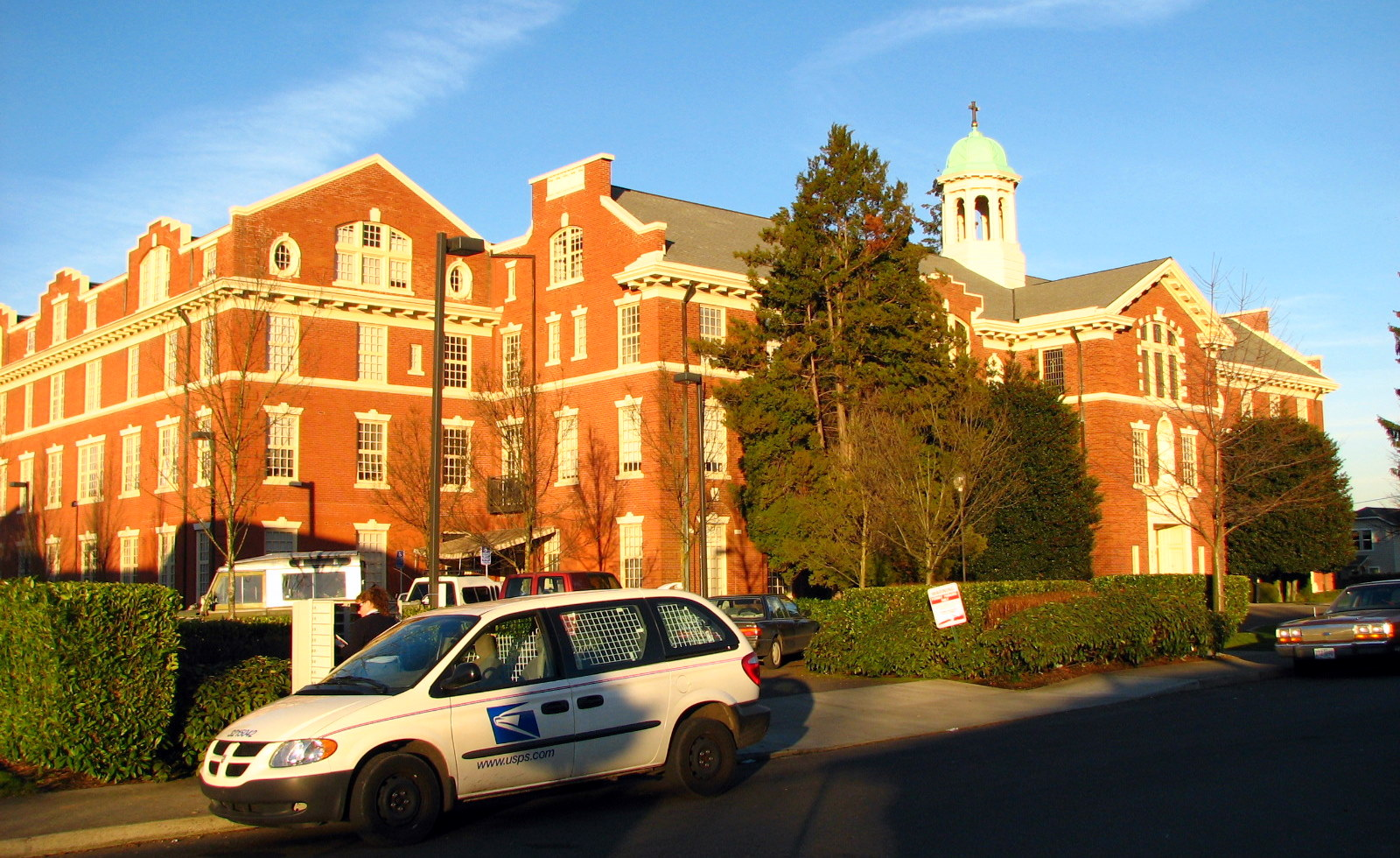
Villa St. Rose, a Catholic convent, is allegedly haunted by disembodied voices and footsteps

| Place | Location | Background | Refs. |
|---|---|---|---|
| Forbes Barclay House | Oregon City | The apparition of a red-haired boy has been seen on the property. | |
| Benson Hotel | Portland | This hotel is reputedly haunted by Simon Benson, its owner who built it in 1912. An apparition of a ghostly man descending the hotel staircase has been reported. | |
| Cathedral Park | Portland | Located in the St. Johns neighborhood, this park is reputed to be haunted by the ghost of Thelma Taylor, a teenager abducted and murdered in the area in 1949. | |
| Columbia Gorge Hotel | Hood River | Incidents of unexplained fires, as well as furniture and other objects moving have been reported by staff and guests. | |
| Crystal Ballroom | Portland | Disembodied laughter has been heard in the ballroom by employees after closing. | |
| Dammasch State Hospital | Wilsonville | Opened in 1961, this psychiatric hospital was reported to be haunted before and after its closing in 1995. It was demolished in 2005. | |
| Fort Dalles | The Dalles | Contemporarily a museum, this post was used as operational site for violent clashes between pioneers and Native Americans, and apparitions have allegedly been observed on the property. | |
| Grand Lodge | Forest Grove | Originally established as a Masonic lodge, the disembodied voices of children laughing, as well as the apparition of an elderly woman have been observed by staff. | |
| Heathman Hotel | Portland | This hotel in Southwest Portland, opened in 1927, is reported to have several haunted rooms. | |
| Holcomb Creek Trestle | Helvetia | This railroad bridge is said to be the location of several suicides and murders, and is allegedly haunted by their ghosts. | |
| Hollywood Theatre | Portland | This venue, built in 1926, originally exhibited vaudeville shows and silent movies. Staff and patrons have reported the apparition of a ghostly male in the upstairs lobby, as well as the apparition of a woman in the back rows of one of the upstairs screening rooms. | |
| Imbrie Farm | Hillsboro | Also known as the Cornelius Pass Roadhouse, this farm is allegedly haunted by various Imbrie family members who died there. | |
| McLoughlin House | Oregon City | Footsteps and slamming doors have been observed in the house, attributed to its original owner, John McLoughlin. | |
| Mount Angel Abbey | Saint Benedict | Supernatural activity has been alleged to have occurred at this Benedictine abbey and university. | |
| Multnomah County Poor Farm | Troutdale | Built in 1911 as a poor farm, this property also served as a sanitorium and reform school before being acquired by McMenamins and converted into a restaurant and hotel, known as McMenamins Edgefield. Guests have reported various supernatural activity, including disembodied voices, crying, and apparitions. | |
| Multnomah Falls | Multnomah County | According to Native American legend, this waterfall is haunted by a maiden of the Multnomah people who leapt to her death from the upper falls in a self-sacrifice to save her village from a plague. | |
| North Portland Library | Portland | The apparition of an elderly man has been seen numerous times on security cameras, particularly in a 2nd-floor conference room. | |
| Oaks Amusement Park | Portland | Known as the "Coney Island of the Northwest" upon opening in 1905, patrons have reported seeing the apparition of a lone child in vintage clothing there who disappears before their eyes. | |
| Old Portland Underground | Portland | Located in the Old Town/Chinatown district, this subterranean tunnel system was used during prohibition, and allegedly served as a smuggling channel for laborers being sold to ship captains along the Willamette River. They have been described as the most haunted locale in the state of Oregon. | |
| Old Town Pizza | Portland | This venue is allegedly haunted by the ghost of Nina, a prostitute who was murdered in the elevator shaft of the building in the late 1800s, when it was then the location of the Merchant Hotel. | |
| Pacific University | Forest Grove | The ghost of Vera, a music student who died in Knight Hall, is said to haunt the building. | |
| Pittock Mansion | Portland | This residence is allegedly haunted by its original owners, publishing magnate Henry Pittock and his wife Georgiana, both of whom died there. | |
| Reed College | Portland | Alleged hauntings on this college campus include a ghost on the third floor of the Prexy residence hall. | |
| Rice Auditorium | Monmouth | This auditorium on the Western Oregon University campus is allegedly haunted by George Harding, a prolific theater director at the university. | |
| Rimsky-Korsakoffee House | Portland | Various poltergeist activity has been reported in this historic home, which contemporarily houses a coffee shop. | |
| Roseland Theater | Portland | This concert hall is reputedly haunted by Timothy Moreau, a 21-year-old publicity agent who was murdered there by the club's owner in 1990. | |
| South Eugene High School | Eugene | The ghost of Robert Granke, a student who fell to his death from a catwalk in the auditorium in 1957, is believed to haunt the school. | |
| Tryon Creek State Park | Portland | The unexplained sounds of horses whinnying and disembodied male voices have been reported here. | |
| Villa St. Rose | Portland | This former Catholic convent and girls' school is allegedly haunted by disembodied voices and footsteps. | |
| Waldschmidt Hall | Portland | Disembodied footsteps and fleeting shadows have been witnessed in this University of Portland building by students and staff. | |
| Welches Roadhouse | Welches | The apparition of a woman who jumped to her death in this mountain cabin is said to haunt the residence. | |
| White Eagle Saloon | Portland | This saloon, opened in 1911, once served as a brothel and opium den, and was the site of many violent brawls. It is allegedly haunted by the ghost of a woman murdered there. One patron reported being inexplicably locked in the women's bathroom for fifteen minutes, only to find that the door had no lock on it. | |

== Southwest ==
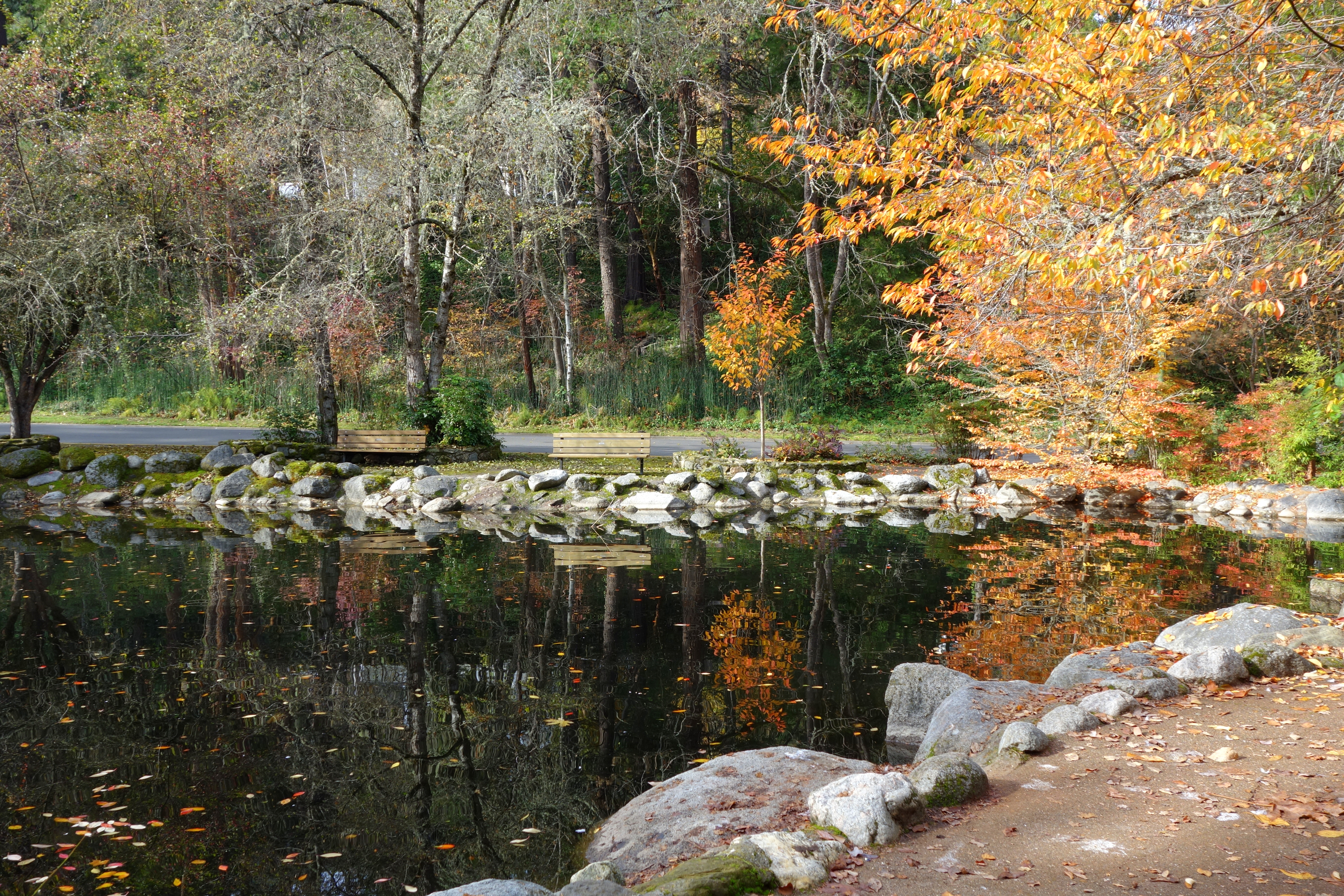
Glowing light orbs have allegedly been witnessed at the ponds in Lithia Park

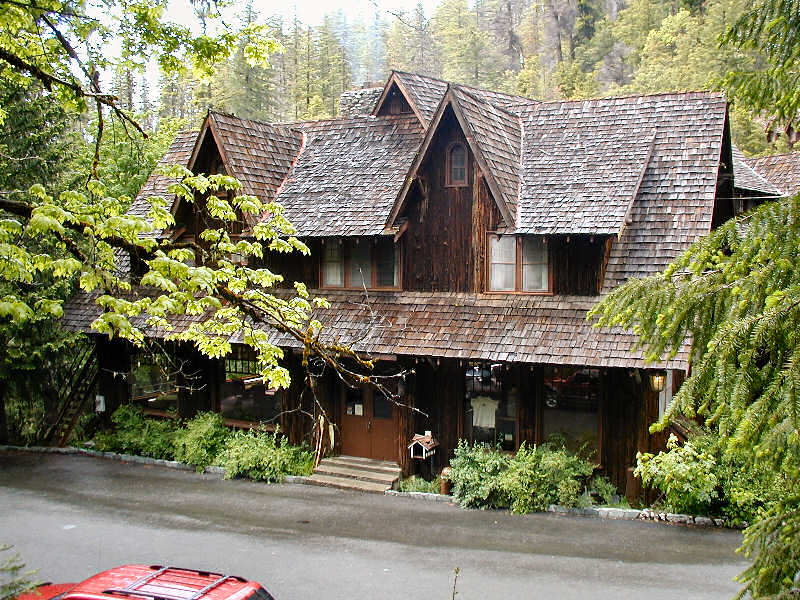
The Oregon Caves Chateau is reportedly haunted by a poltergeist

| Place | Location | Background | Refs. |
|---|---|---|---|
| Ashland Springs Hotel | Ashland | Originally known as the Mark Antony Hotel, employees and guests here have witnessed shadowy figures as well as the apparition of a bellboy at the elevator. | |
| Elizabethan Theatre | Ashland | The ghost of actor Charles Laughton, who frequented the Oregon Shakespeare Festival, was allegedly seen and heard at the theatre after his death in 1962. | |
| Lithia Park | Ashland | This park is reputedly haunted by the ghost of a young girl murdered there in the 19th century, and visitors have described a blue light glowing above one of its ponds. | |
| Oregon Caves Chateau | Cave Junction | This rustic lodge is reputedly haunted by a poltergeist named Elizabeth, a woman who committed suicide in the chateau in 1937. | |
| Oregon Vortex | Gold Hill | A gravity hill that causes optical illusions, this area has been described as causing inexplicable unease in visitors. | |
| Southern Oregon University | Ashland | Paranormal activity has been described in several buildings on the campus, namely Churchill Hall, and Taylor Hall, where the apparition of a former janitor has been observed. | |
| Wolf Creek Inn | Wolf Creek | Opened in 1883 as a carriage stop, this inn was allegedly the site of a vampire-like being that attacked a traveler there in the 1970s. | |

== Central ==
| Place | Location | Background | Refs. |
|---|---|---|---|
| Thomas McCann House | Bend | Paranormal activity, reported by an owner of the home, has been attributed to the ghost of McCann's grandmother, who died there. | |
| Redmond Hotel | Redmond | The apparition of a woman has been witnessed by guests, as well as floating orbs. | |
| St. Francis School | Bend | Apparitions of children and poltergeist activity have been reported by guests at this now-hotel. | |
| Sunriver Resort | Sunriver | Formerly a military training center known as Camp Abbot, this resort's Great Hall has been the site of alleged poltergeist activity, attributed to the ghost of a soldier. | |

== Coastal ==
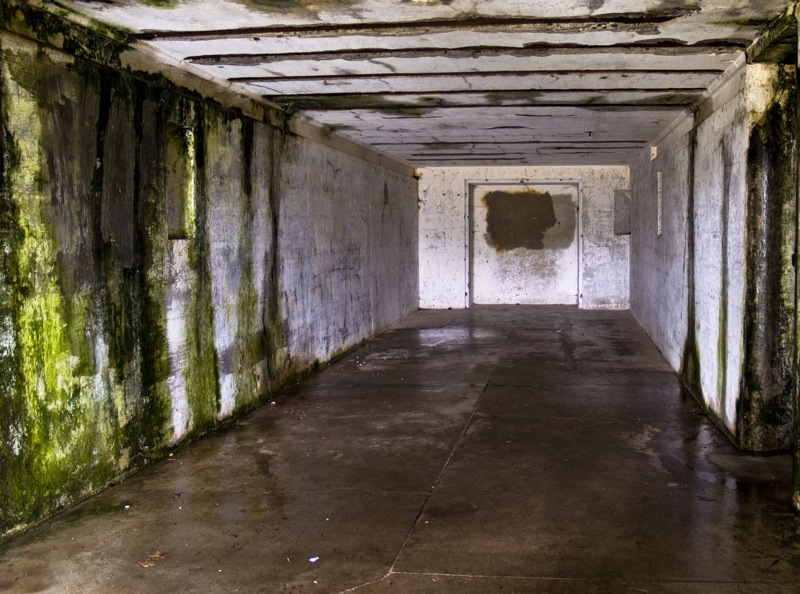
Apparitions have reportedly been witnessed at Fort Stevens

| Place | Location | Background | Refs. |
|---|---|---|---|
| Egyptian Theatre | Coos Bay | Guests have reported being touched by an unseen entity in this theater. | |
| Flavel House | Astoria | This mansion built by Irish-American maritime merchant George Flavel, now a museum, has been the site of alleged poltergeist activity. | |
| Fort Stevens | Warrenton | A former military fort built in 1863, this location is reputedly haunted by the apparition of a young soldier who walks its outlying paths. The battery itself is also reputedly haunted. | |
| Heceta Head Lighthouse | Florence | A "woman in gray" has been observed walking the property. | |
| Neahkahnie Mountain | Tillamook County | Spanish pirates massacred on this mountain in the early 1700s by united Tillamook, Clatsop, and Nehalem peoples are alleged to haunt the site. | |
| Siletz Bay | Lincoln City | The Blanco, a phantom schooner which capsized in the bay in 1864, has allegedly been seen appearing and disappearing the bay. The bay is a graveyard to three other schooners: the Sunbeam, Uncle John, and the Phoebe Fay, all of which sunk there in the 19th century. | |

== See also ==
- List of reportedly haunted locations in the United States
- List of reportedly haunted locations in the world

== Sources ==
- Hauck, Dennis William (2002). Haunted Places: The National Directory: Ghostly Abodes, Sacred Sites, UFO Landings and Other Supernatural Locations. New York City, New York: Penguin Books. ISBN 978-0-142-00234-6.
- Kitmacher, Ira Wesley (2022). Spirits Along the Columbia River. Charleston, South Carolina: Arcadia Publishing. ISBN 978-1-439-67597-7.
- Lankford, Andrea (2006). Haunted Hikes: Spine-Tingling Tales and Trails from North America's National Parks. Santa Monica, California: Santa Monica Press. ISBN 978-1-595-80009-1.
- Ogden, Tom (2018). Haunted Cemeteries: Creepy Crypts, Spine-Tingling Spirits, And Midnight Mayhem (2nd ed.). New York City, New York: Rowman & Littlefield. ISBN 978-1-493-03663-9.
- Palahniuk, Chuck (2007). Fugitives and Refugees: A Walk in Portland, Oregon. New York City, New York: Crown. ISBN 978-0-307-42075-6.
- Smitten, Susan (2001). Ghost Stories of Oregon. Auburn, Washington: Lone Pine Publishing. ISBN 978-1-894877-13-8.
- Stewart, Donna (2014). Ghosthunting Oregon. Cincinnati, Ohio: Clerisy Press. ISBN 978-1-578-60549-1.
- Weeks, Andy (2014). Haunted Oregon: Ghosts and Strange Phenomena of the Beaver State. Mechanicsburg, Pennsylvania: Stackpole Books. ISBN 978-0-811-71263-7.
