= Kennedy Elementary School =

There are a number of Elementary schools named Kennedy Elementary School:

- Kennedy Elementary School (Santa Ana, California)
- Kennedy Elementary School (St. Joseph, Minnesota)
- Kennedy Elementary School (Fargo, North Dakota)
- John D. Kennedy Elementary School, Portland, Oregon – former school building listed on the U.S. National Register of Historic Places
- Kennedy Elementary School (Madison, Wisconsin)
