= Rams Head Pub =

Defunct restaurant in Portland, Oregon, U.S.

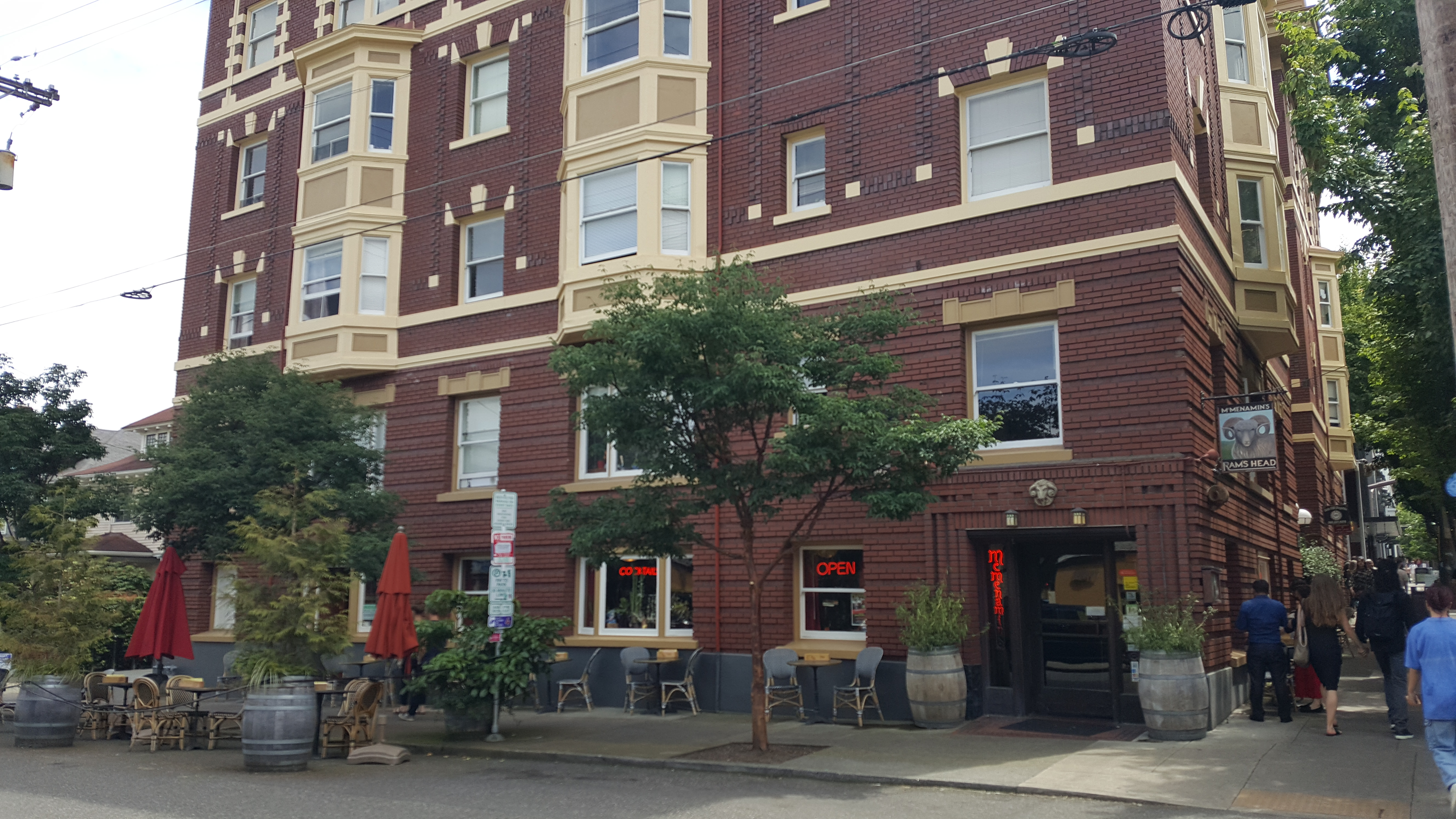
- The restaurant's exterior, 2022
- Interactive map of Rams Head Pub

Restaurant information
- Closed: June 2025
- Owner: McMenamins
- Location: 2282 Northwest Hoyt Street, Portland, Multnomah, Oregon, 97210, United States
- Coordinates: 45.5268°N 122.6984°W

Rams Head Pub was a restaurant and bar in Portland, Oregon, United States. McMenamins operated the pub in northwest Portland's Northwest District. In 2025, the company announced plans to close Rams Head Pub permanently in June, after operating for approximately 35 years.

== Description ==
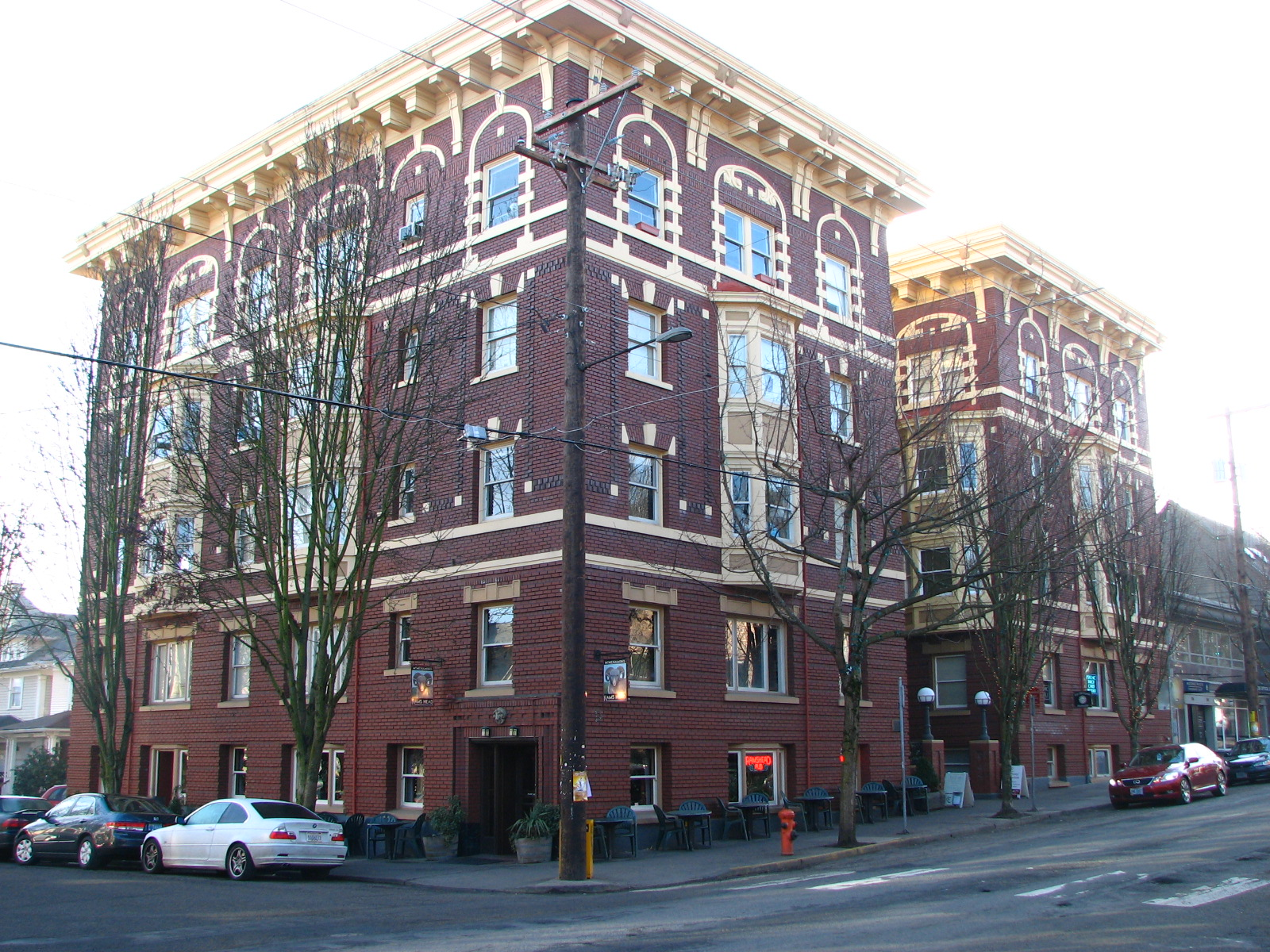
Exterior of the Campbell Hotel, which is listed on the National Register of Historic Places and houses the pub, in 2009.

The company McMenamins operated the restaurant and bar Rams Head Pub in the Campbell Hotel (also known as the Campbell Building) at the intersection of Northwest 23rd Avenue and Hoyt Street, in the Nob Hill area northwest Portland's Northwest District. The restaurant had a red brick facade, sidewalk seating, a lounge, coffered ceilings, stamped-tin wainscoting, and ornate woodwork. Portland Monthly said the interior was "a time machine, with ample seating and a thrift store-esque stench that's light enough to tolerate". The drink menu included liquor jellies, whiskey flights, and mixed drinks such as an apple pie cocktail and a pomegranate-infused sparkler.

== History ==
Rams Head Pub operated in the Campbell Hotel, which is listed on the National Register of Historic Places and previously housed one of the city's largest speakeasies, called Rams Head. Rams Head Pub was among the first properties operated by McMenamins, which was established in 1983.

In 2014, McMenamins converted the pub into an "artisanal" cocktail bar.

In February 2025, McMenamins announced plans to close Rams Head permanently in June.

== Reception ==
Carrie Uffindell included Rams Head in Eater Portland's 2017 overview of twelve "must-visit" McMenamins pubs and restaurants. She called the pub "arguably McMenamins' most elegant space", with many cocktail and spirit options. Writers for Portland Monthly ranked Rams Head thirtieth in a list of all McMenamins properties in the metropolitan area.

== See also ==
- List of defunct restaurants of the United States
- List of McMenamins properties
- National Register of Historic Places listings in Northwest Portland, Oregon
