= Brian McMenamin =

American businessman

- Born: 1957 (age 67–68); Portland, Oregon, US
- Occupation: Co-founder of McMenamins
- Website: Company biography

Brian McMenamin (born 1957) is an American businessman in the state of Oregon. A native of the state, he and his older brother Mike McMenamin founded the McMenamins restaurant and brewpub chain in 1983. He serves as general manager and vice-president of the company which operates more than 50 locations that include music venues such as the Crystal Ballroom, movie theaters such as the Bagdad Theatre, historic buildings converted to brewpubs like the Cornelius Pass Roadhouse, and several hotels.

== Early life ==
Brian McMenamin was born in Portland, Oregon, in 1957 to Robert W. and Pat McMenamin. He was raised in Northeast Portland where he attended Catholic schools, including local Madeleine Grade School and Jesuit High School in nearby Beaverton. He then went to Oregon State University in Corvallis where he studied pre-law, as his father was an attorney. McMenamin graduated from the school in 1980 with a degree in political science. His older brother Mike was involved in several ventures involving taverns and pubs in the 1970s. Brian worked for his brother at Produce Row Café in Southeast Portland, before the two partnered to start McMenamins Pub in Hillsdale, in 1980 with financial assistance from their father. That pub is not part of the current company.

== McMenamins ==
Mike McMenamin purchased the Fat Little Rooster bar in Southeast Portland in 1983, starting the company. He renamed it as the Barley Mill Pub and Brian soon joined the company. The next year the brothers and several others lobbied the state legislature to change Oregon's law that prohibited those making alcohol from selling it on the premises, allowing for the establishment of brewpubs. By 1991 the company had grown to 25 locations and $10 million in annual sales. Brian serves as the vice-president and general manager of the company, which is the fourth largest chain of brewpubs in the United States. He owns 30% of the brothers' share of the privately held company that grosses over $70 million annually. The brothers own 75% of the company. Brian is considered the "numbers guy" of the company known for restoring historic properties.
