= Bernadette Bascom =

American R&B singer

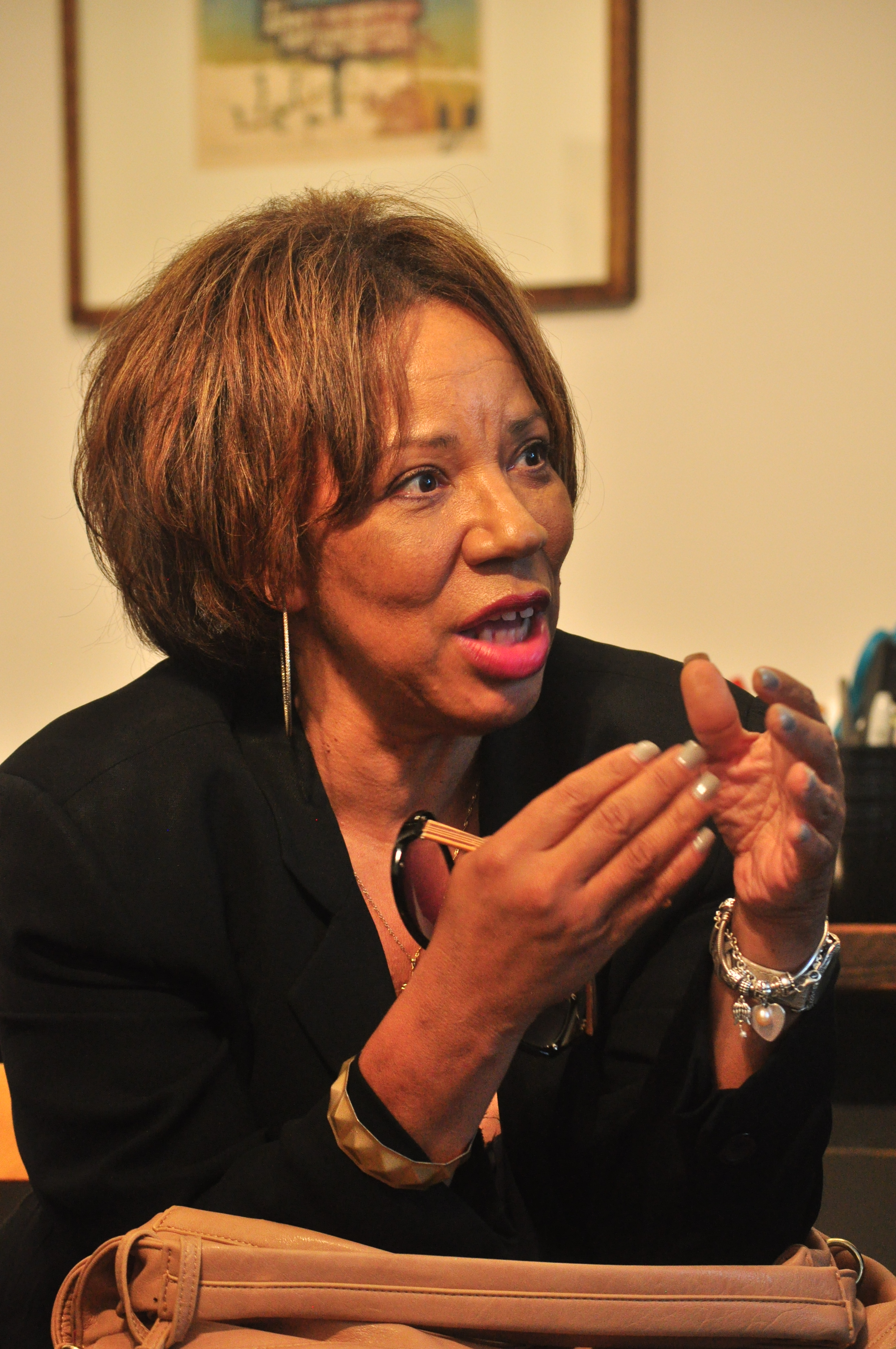
Bernadette Bascom, 2014

Bernadette Bascom (born 1962 in Baltimore) is an American R&B singer.

The daughter of Civil Rights activist Rev. Marion C. Bascom, she began her career as a voice over artist for a local DJ on a Baltimore, Maryland radio station. Bascom was the first artist signed to Stevie Wonder's label Black Bull, and she later forged a great recording career in the Pacific Northwest. For fifteen years, Bascom sang on the Las Vegas strip, and she was the co-star in the award-winning show Divine Divas. She was also one of the Motown Moments at the Motown Cafe. Bascom recorded for her own labels Penguin and Solidarity Records. "I Don't Want to Lose your Love" (written and produced by Bill Miller) is her trademark song. She has worked with Elton John, Lenny Williams, among other musicians.

In 2004, Bascom returned to Seattle where she has taught vocal lessons, performance, and production. She is the creator of "PRAISE!, a Sunday Gospel Supper," which has run at The Triple Door in downtown Seattle. She manages the Northshore Wranglers Program as a vocal coach. Room 315 at the Anderson School is dedicated to her.

In 2010, Bascom became a music and vocal teacher at Northwest University in Kirkland, Washington, where she still teaches.

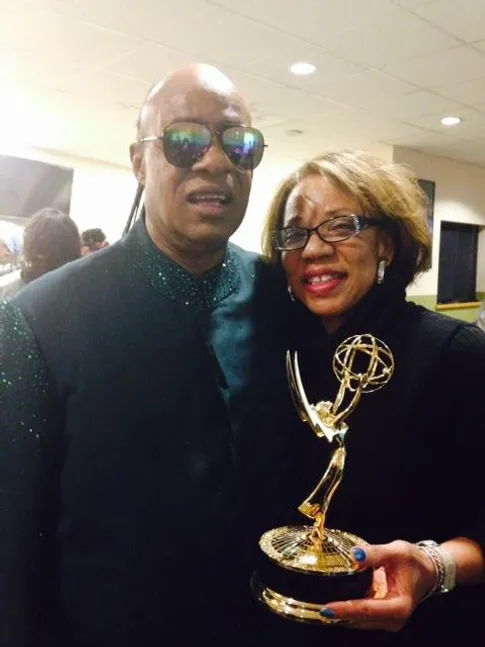
Bernadette Bascom holding 2012 Emmy, posing with friend and musician Stevie Wonder

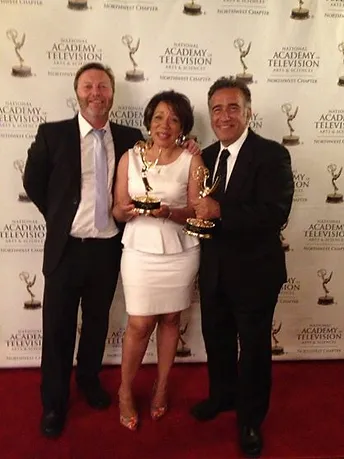
Bernadette Bascom posing for 2012 Emmy for Best Human Interest piece along with Seattle TV station King 5 producers John Sharify and Douglas Burgess

In 2007, Bascom started the Music Project, a program designed to use singing to develop children's speaking skills and confidence. She discovered that many of her enrollees were neurodivergent and their speaking and ability to express themselves benefited greatly from the program. A documentary on the program called "Bernadette's Touch" was filmed by Seattle station King 5 News . The documentary earned her a 2012 Emmy Award for Human Interest Documentary in conjunction with the writers and producers of the piece.

As a result of her success in the Music Project, Bascom collaborated with innovators at Microsoft Corporation to create a mobile application that teaches the principles from her in-person Music Project program. Her intention was to reach more people than just those who were able to attend her program in the greater Seattle area. As of March 2023, the app called "Speak!" is available in the Apple store and as an early release in the Google play store.

As of 2023, Bascom is a resident of Bothell, a northeastern suburb of Seattle.
