= Hryszko Brothers Building =

Historic building in Portland, Oregon, U.S.

- U.S. National Register of Historic Places
- Portland Historic Landmark
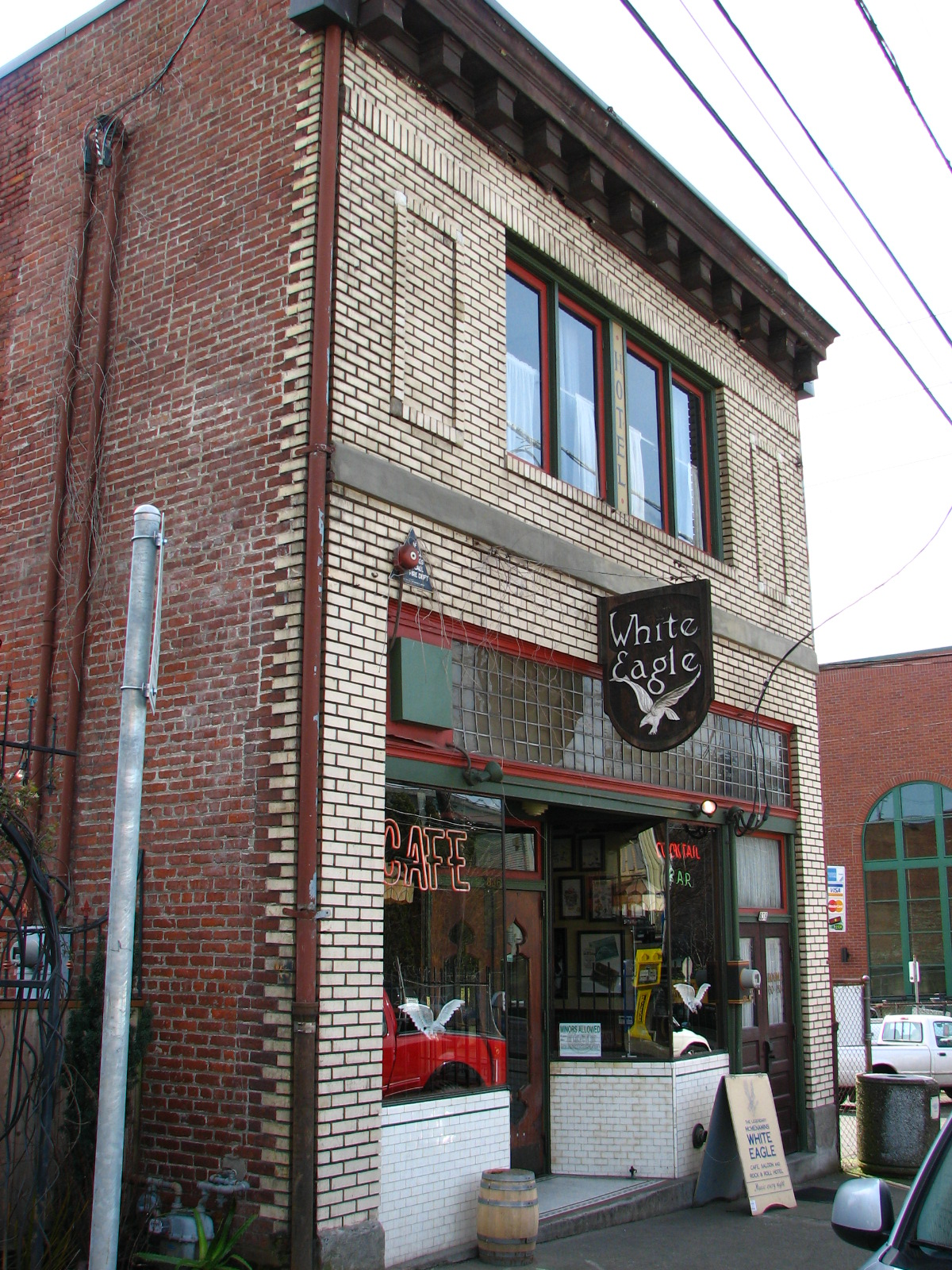
- Hryszko Brothers Building in 2008

- Location within Portland, Oregon Location within Oregon Location within the United States
- Location: 836 N. Russell Street, Portland, Oregon
- Coordinates: 45°32′27″N 122°40′32″W
- Area: 0.1 acres (0.040 ha)
- Built: 1905
- Architect: W. C. Arthur & Co.
- Architectural style: Early Commercial
- MPS: Eliot Neighborhood MPS
- NRHP reference No.: 98000950
- Added to NRHP: July 31, 1998

The Hryszko Brothers Building is a building located at 836 North Russell Street, in the historic Albina District of north Portland, Oregon, United States. It was established in 1905 by Polish immigrants as a meeting hall and aid station, later hosting meetings by the St. Stanislaus Catholic Church and the Polish Library. It is now operated by McMenamins under the name White Eagle Saloon & Hotel, or simply White Eagle. The building is listed on the National Register of Historic Places.

== See also ==
- National Register of Historic Places listings in North Portland, Oregon
