= Wilson–Chambers Mortuary =

Historic building in Portland, Oregon, U.S.

- U.S. National Register of Historic Places
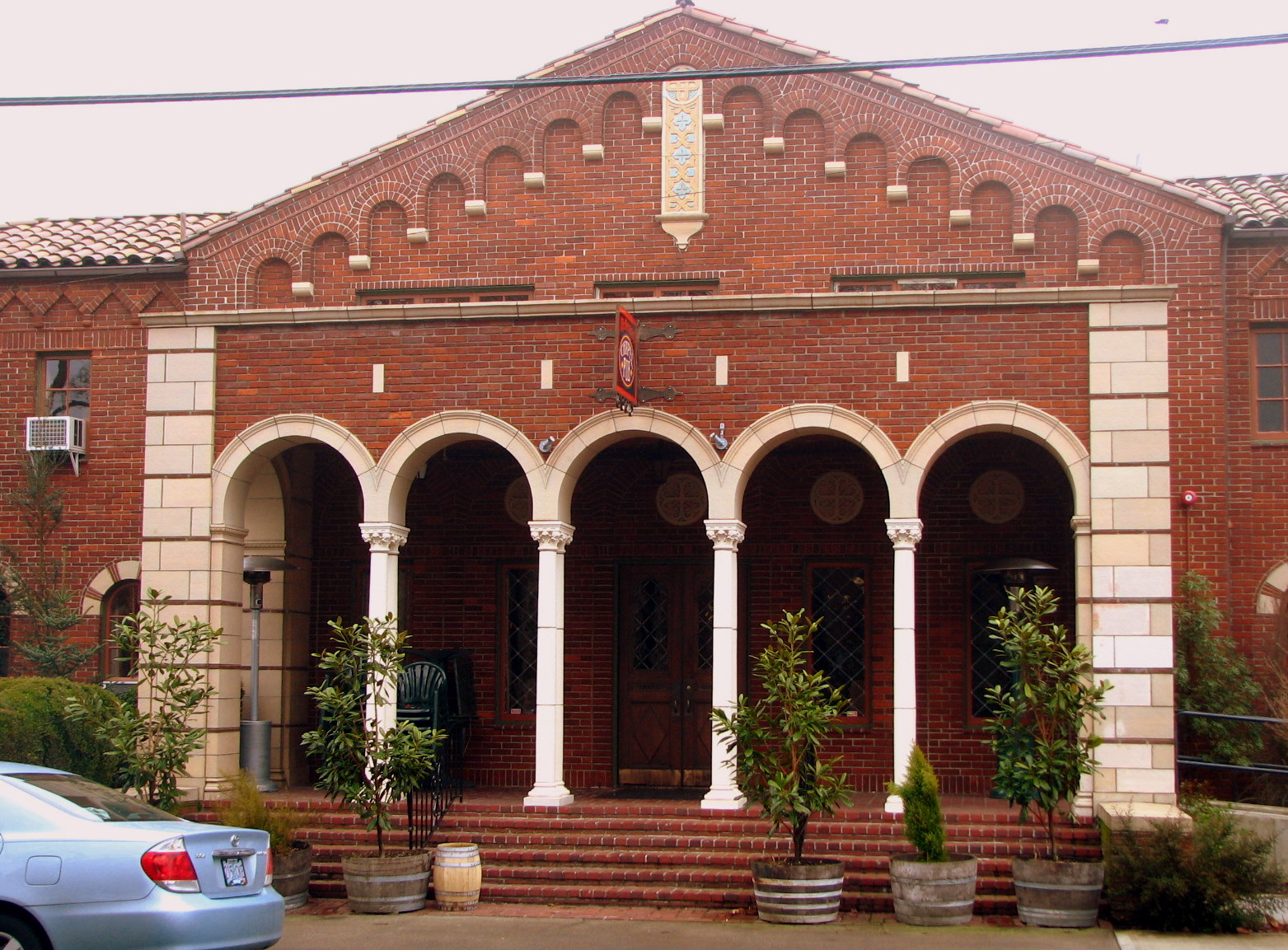
- The mortuary's exterior in 2009

- Location within Portland, Oregon Location within Oregon Location within the United States
- Location: 430 N Killingsworth St, Portland, Oregon
- Coordinates: 45°33′45″N 122°40′15″W
- Area: less than one acre
- Built: 1932
- Architect: Richard Sundeleaf
- Architectural style: Late 19th and 20th Century Revivals
- NRHP reference No.: 07000263
- Added to NRHP: April 05, 2007

The Wilson–Chambers Mortuary, a former funeral home located in north Portland, Oregon, is listed on the National Register of Historic Places.

== See also ==
- National Register of Historic Places listings in North Portland, Oregon
