= Anderson School (Bothell, Washington) =

Hotel and former junior high school in Bothell, Washington

Coordinates: 47°45′45″N 122°12′29″W

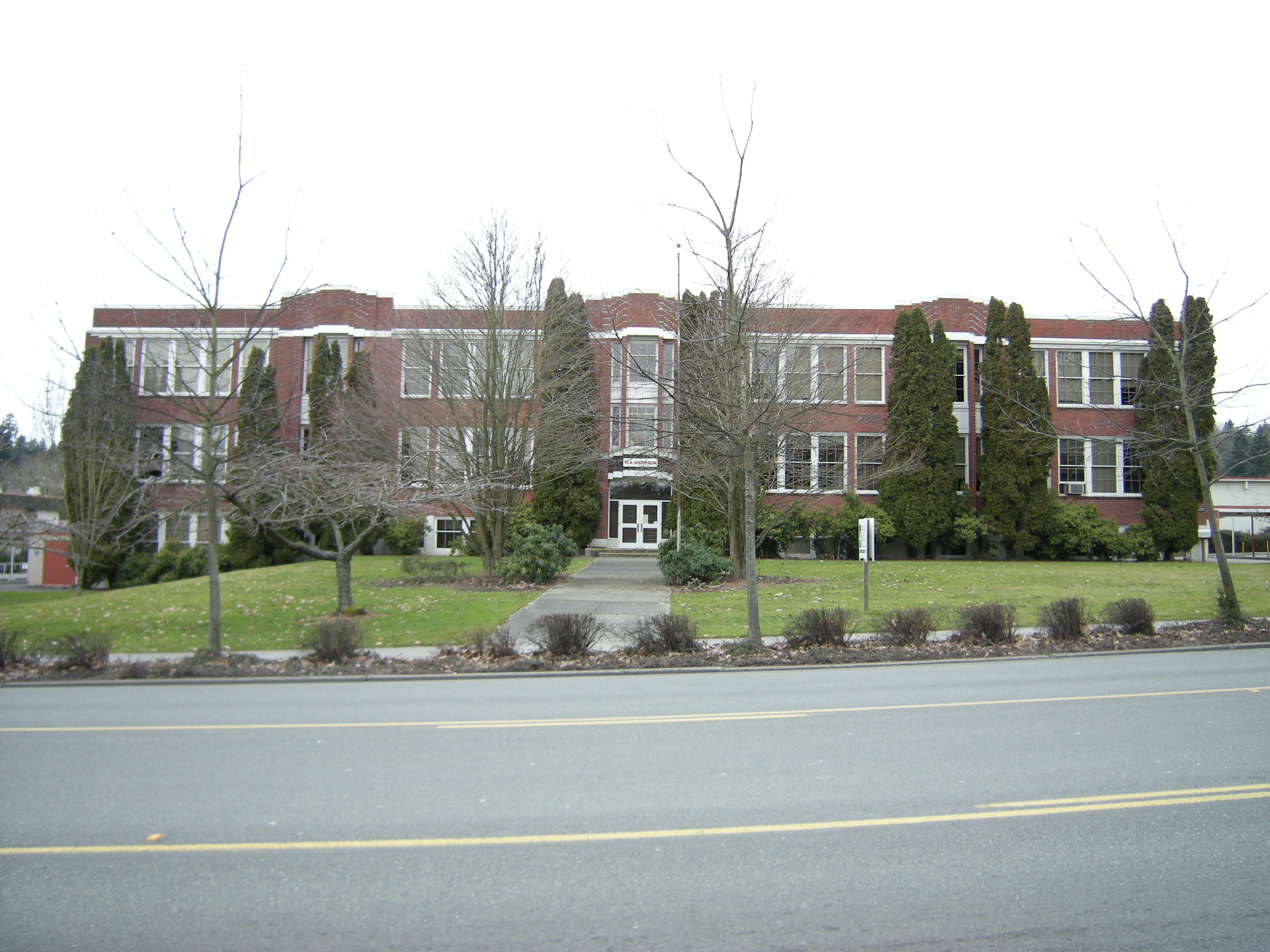
The building as seen in 2009

The Anderson School is a former junior high school that currently operates as a renovated restaurant, bar, and hotel in Bothell, Washington, 15 miles northeast of Seattle. The Anderson School, designed by Seattle architect Earl W. Morrison, was built in 1931 and opened as Bothell Junior High, later renamed after the school's first principal, Wilbert A. "Andy" Anderson.

The school was purchased by the city of Bothell in 2009 and sold to McMenamins in 2010. The hotel was redeveloped and opened in 2015.

== Amenities ==
The hotel features rooms named after Bothell residents of note, including musician Chris Walla, R&B singer Bernadette Bascom, television and film director Rob Thompson, and U.S. Senator Patty Murray.

The Anderson School features a movie theater, swimming pool, brewery, and garden, as well as a wedding and private event space. It is currently the largest McMenamins property in Washington.
