= Hotel Oregon (McMinnville) =

Historic building in McMinnville, Oregon, U.S.

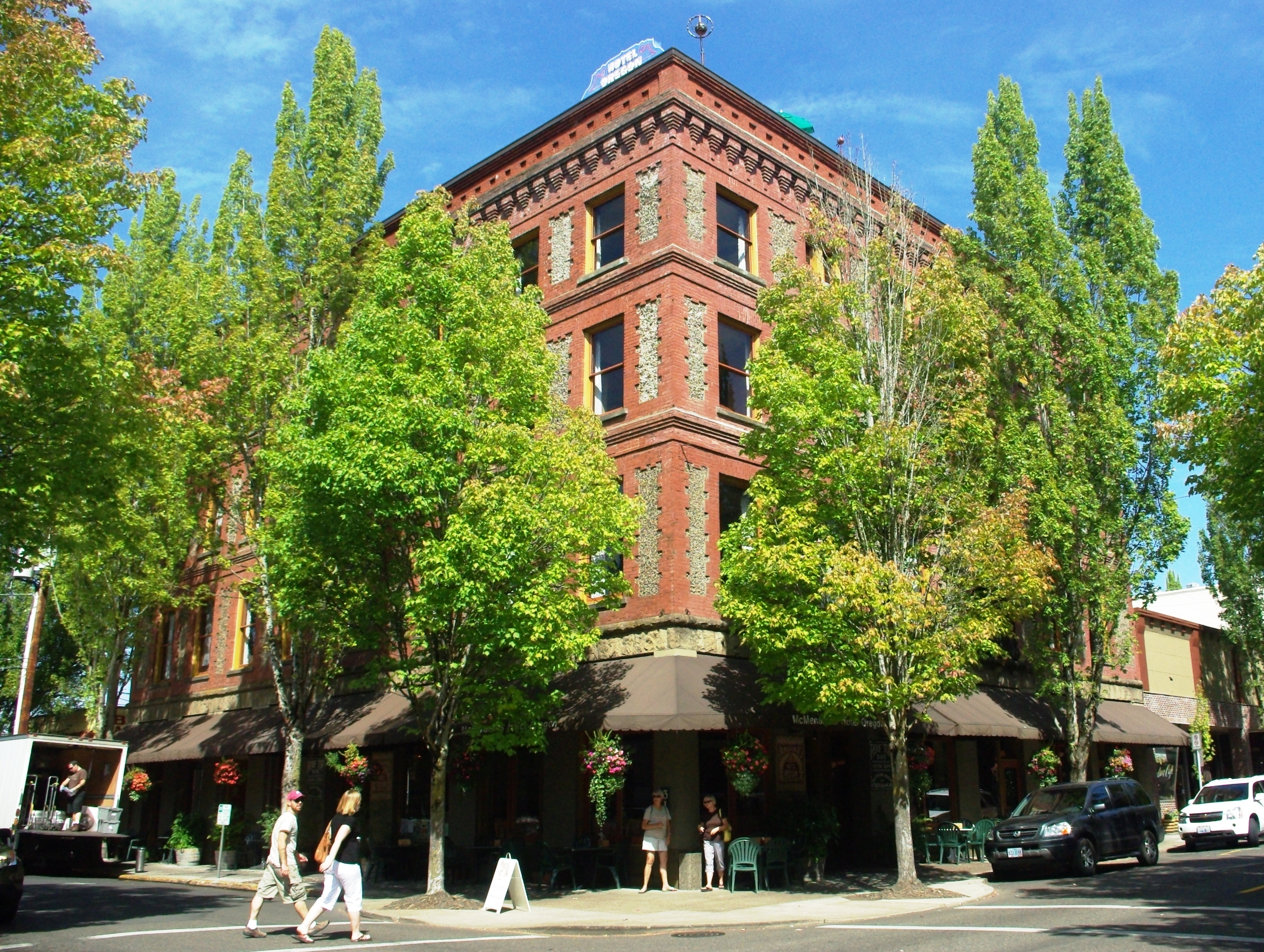
- Interactive map of the Hotel Oregon area

General information
- Location: McMinnville, Oregon, U.S.

The Hotel Oregon in McMinnville, Oregon, was originally opened in 1905 as the Hotel Elberton. The hotel, built in the Richardsonian Romanesque architectural style, remains the tallest building in downtown McMinnville. In 1999, the property was renovated and reopened as McMenamins Hotel Oregon, the largest historic hotel building in Yamhill County.

The Hotel Oregon hosts an annual UFO convention, where the location is decorated with relics of the building's history and the town's famous 1950 UFO sighting.
