= Crystal Hotel (Portland, Oregon) =

Historic building in Portland, Oregon, U.S.

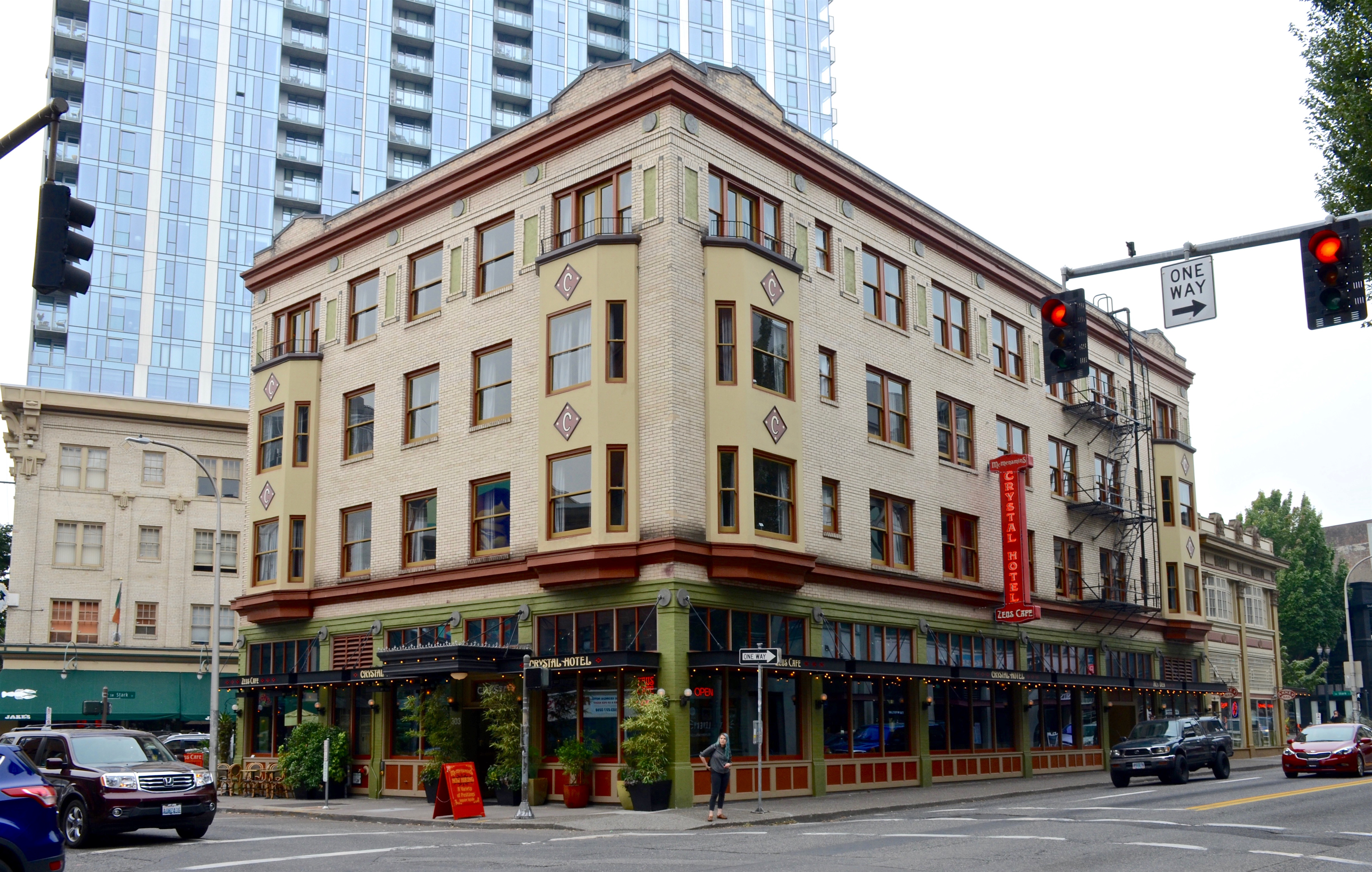
- The Crystal Hotel (formerly Hotel Alma) in 2017

- Location within Portland, Oregon

General information
- Location: Portland, Oregon, 1201-1217 SW Stark St
- Opening: May 3, 2011

Other information
- Number of rooms: 51
- Hotel Alma
- U.S. National Register of Historic Places
- Location: 1201–1217 SW Stark Street; Portland, Oregon
- Coordinates: 45°31′22″N 122°41′00″W
- Area: 0.1 acres (0.040 ha)
- Built: 1911; 115 years ago
- Architect: Hans Hanselman
- Architectural style: Early Commercial
- MPS: Downtown Portland, Oregon MPS
- NRHP reference No.: 09000706
- Added to NRHP: September 9, 2009

The Crystal Hotel (formerly Hotel Alma) is a hotel located in downtown Portland, Oregon, United States. Originally named the Hotel Alma, the building is listed on the National Register of Historic Places and is considered a significant LGBTQ site. The property is operated by McMenamins.

== History ==
Built in 1911 as the Hotel Alma, the building housed a hotel above and auto-focused business on busy Burnside Street. After World War II the building hosted Club Mecca and later the Desert Room, which became a hallmark of vice within a US Senate hearing. By 1978, the building housed a gay bathhouse (Club Portland), and a gay bar, Flossie’s, later known as Silverado.

After an extensive renovation and restoration, McMenamins opened the hotel on May 3, 2011. In 2019, The Oregonian's Michael Russell named the hotel's Zeus Café as one of "noteworthy scores" in a list of failed health department inspections, having scored 43, the lowest score of the year in Multnomah County.

In 2023, the Zeus Café was renamed Hal's Café.
