= Kennedy School =

Historic building in Portland, Oregon, U.S.

- John D. Kennedy Elementary School
- U.S. National Register of Historic Places
- Portland Historic Landmark
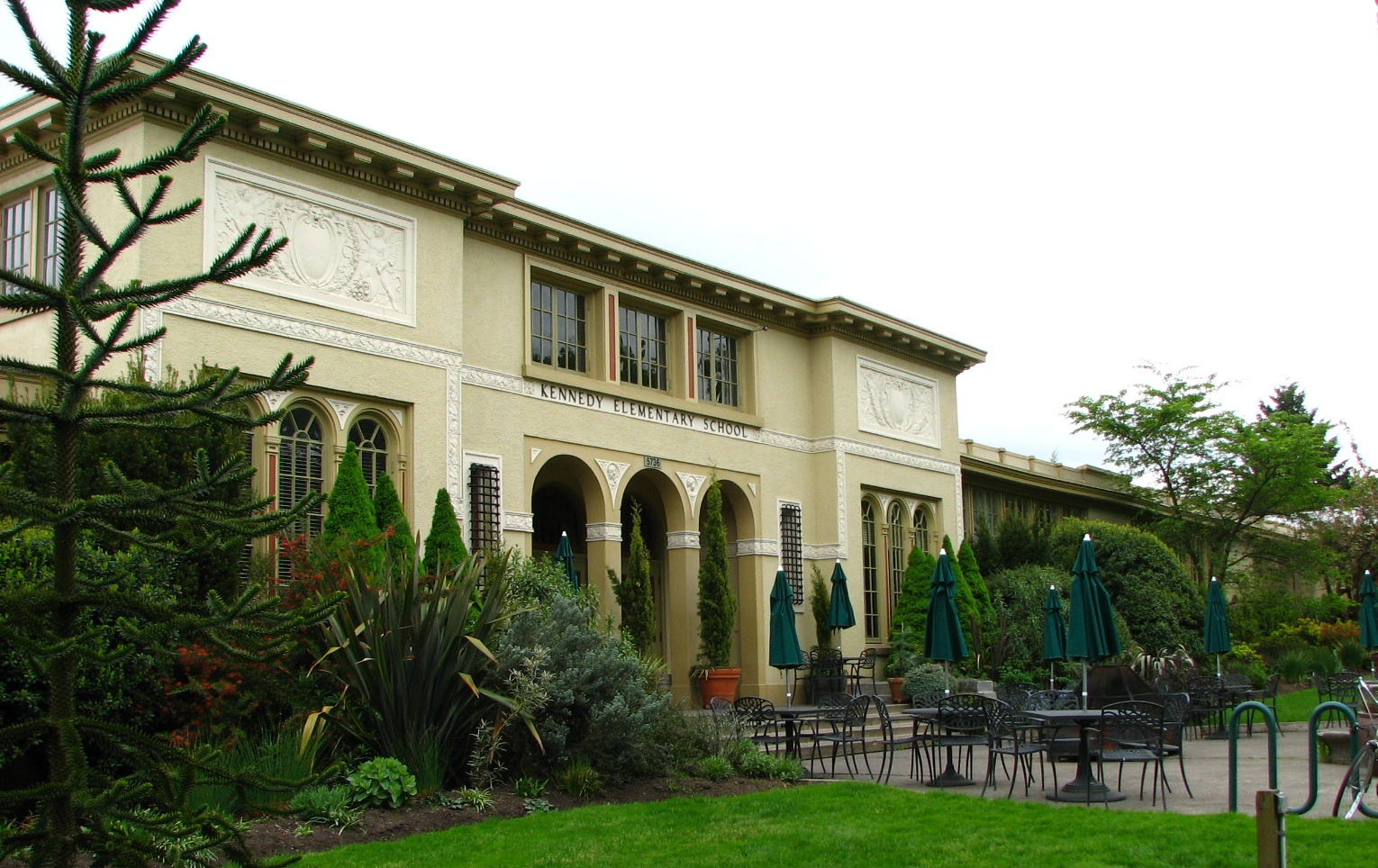
- The main entry of Kennedy School in 2008.

- Location within Portland, Oregon
- Location: 5736 NE 33rd Avenue; Portland, Oregon
- Coordinates: 45°33′52″N 122°37′49″W
- Area: 4.22 acres (1.71 ha)
- Built: 1915
- Architect: Floyd Naramore
- Architectural style: Renaissance Revival
- NRHP reference No.: 88003472
- Added to NRHP: November 22, 1995

The Kennedy School, originally the John D. Kennedy Elementary School, is a former elementary school that has been converted to a hotel, movie theater and dining establishment in northeast Portland, Oregon. The facility is operated by the McMenamins chain. The hotel has 35 guestrooms, a brewery, four bars, and a restaurant.

== History ==
The school was built in 1915. The land for the school was sold by John Daniel Kennedy to the Portland School District in 1913.

== Currently ==
By the 1990s, the school had been abandoned. McMenamins, the Portland-based hotel and pub group, bought the old building and funded a full renovation. Today, the Kennedy School functions as an event space with 57 classroom-turned-guestrooms with original chalkboards included. The old cafeteria has been converted into a courtyard restaurant, and the common areas now include a bar, gift shop, movie theater, brewery, and soaking tub.

Kennedy School won in the "Best Date Bar" category of Willamette Week's "Best of Portland Readers' Poll 2020".

== See also ==
- National Register of Historic Places listings in Northeast Portland, Oregon
