= The Grand Lodge Hotel =

Hotel and theater in Oregon, U.S.

Coordinates: 45.5216°N 123.0862°W

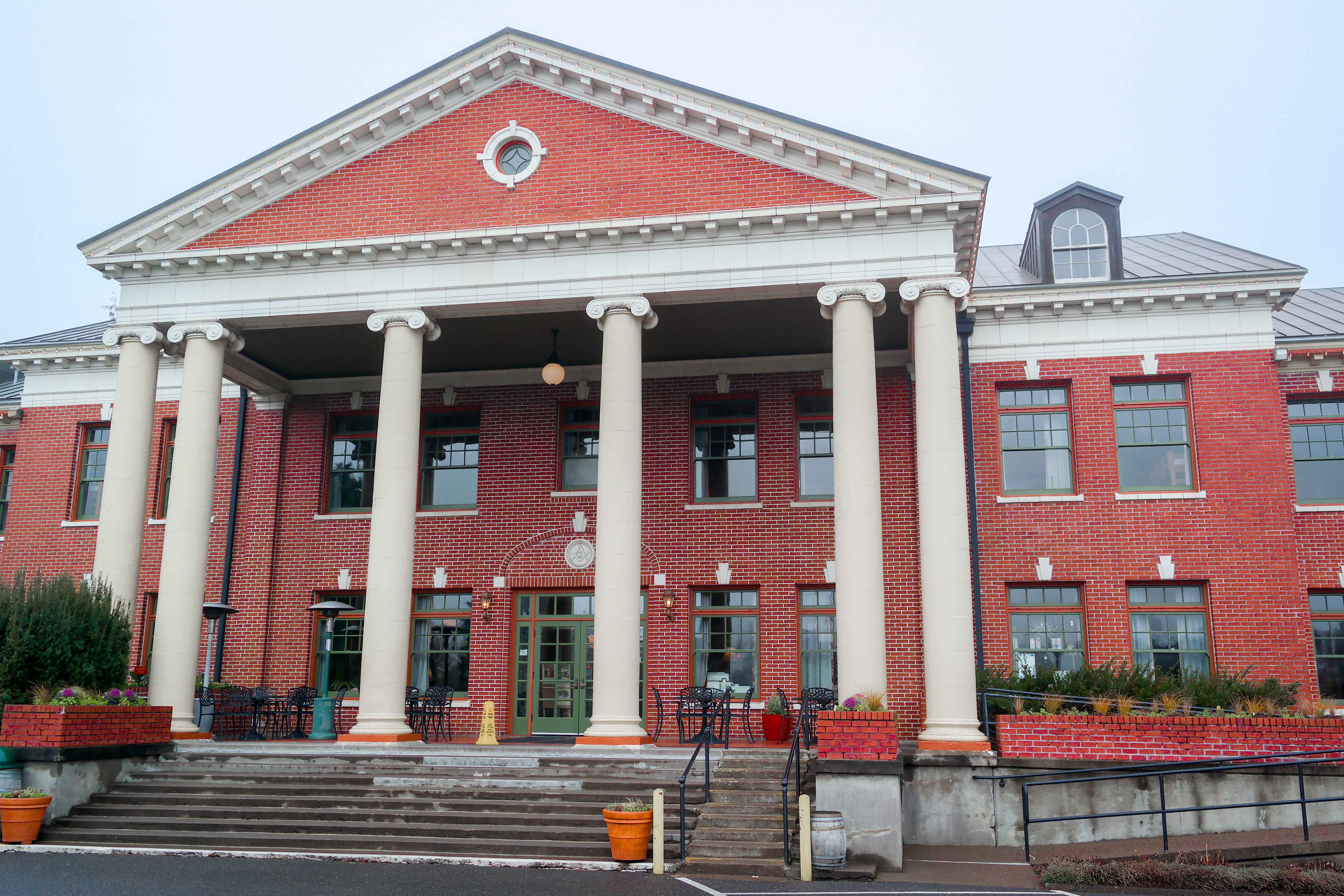
- Interactive map of the The Grand Lodge Hotel area

General information
- Type: Hotel; theatre
- Location: Forest Grove, Oregon, U.S.
- Owner: McMenamins Pubs & Breweries

The Grand Lodge is a hotel and theatre in Forest Grove, Oregon, owned by McMenamins Pubs & Breweries. The building was originally constructed as a Masonic home in the 1920s, and was briefly the site of an orphanage. McMenamins became the custodian of the property in 1999, renovating and reopening it as McMenamins Grand Lodge in 2000.

== History ==
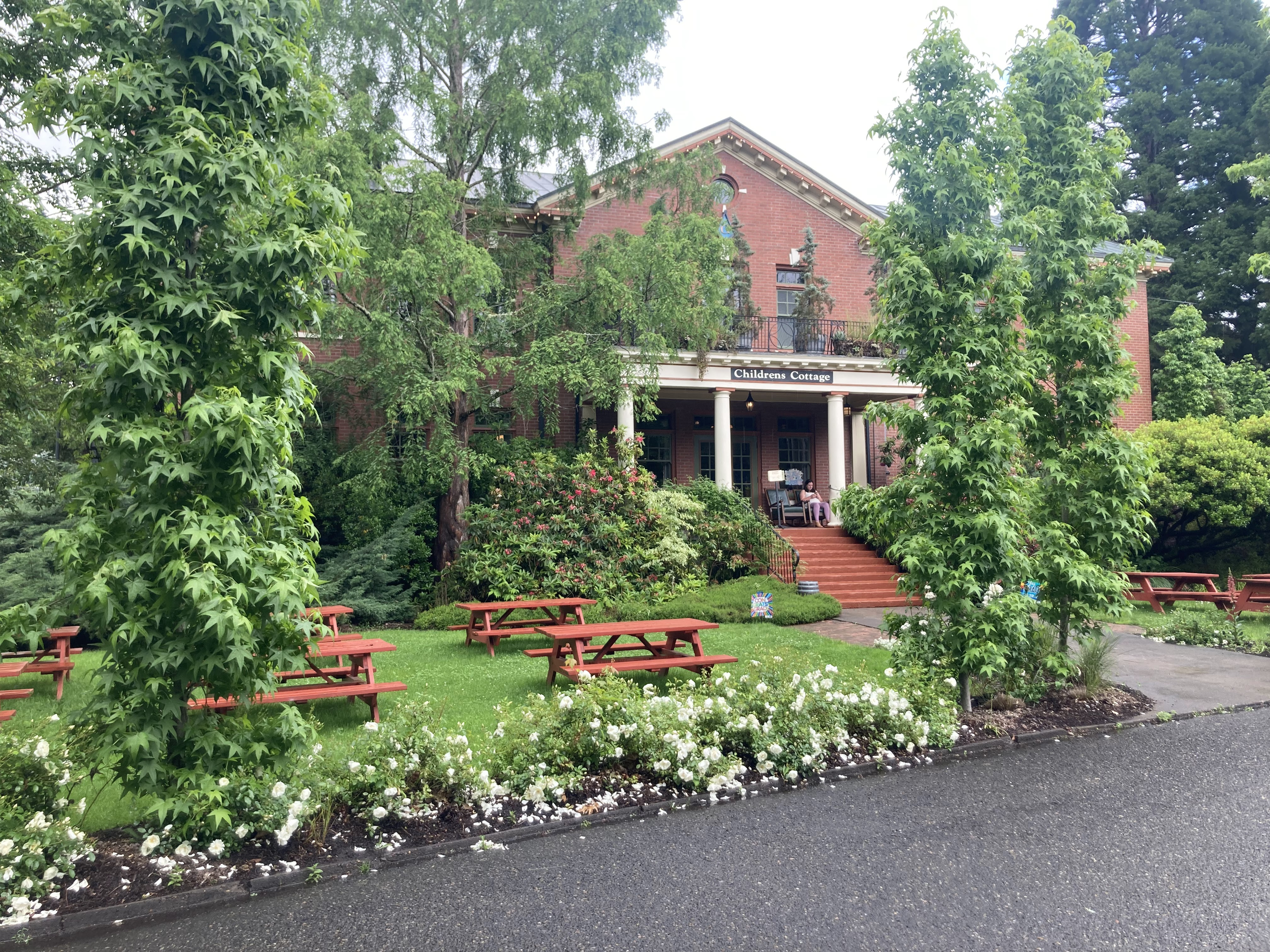
Children's Cottage at McMenamins Grand Lodge

In 1917, plans were developed for the Masonic and Eastern Star Home for the State of Oregon, and construction began in 1920. It was established as a home for Masons and their families in need, and began operations in 1922. Initial construction costs were estimated at $245,000. A smaller building, called the Children's Cottage, was built in 1926 to house orphans, but the orphanage closed in 1928 after conflict between the children and the elders.

Throughout the 1930s, the home struggled financially. The building suffered roof damage in 1962 after the Columbus Day Storm. In 1999 the Masons began building new facilities with the intention of moving out of the original Masonic Home and Children's Cottage. McMenamins began renovations fall 1999, and reopened the building as McMenamins Grand Lodge in March 2000.

As of 2010, the Grand Lodge had 77 European-style rooms, and a historian on its staff. The interior of the hotel – including walls, doors, posts, and ceilings – had been redecorated into a gallery reflecting the local history, "often in whimsical fashion". In 2017, the McMenamins added 22 new rooms, upgraded 23 other rooms, and added a new bar.

== Facilities ==
The McMenamins Grand Lodge has 90 guestrooms and is known for its "quirky" character. Each bedroom features unique decorations honoring a different literary author, with hand-painted headboards that bring their books to life. In June 2022, Portland Monthly magazine reported that McMenamins Grand Lodge had "two restaurants, three bars, a hotel, a spa, a movie theatre, a disc golf course, and generally lush, walkable grounds."

=== Events ===
In 2002, the hotel introduced a new summer concert series called "Grand Lodge Concerts in the Grove". The lawn on the Grand Lodge property has a maximum capacity of 3,300. In the past, the Grand Lodge hosted musical events such as the Sundown Grand ol' Country Festival and the American Music Festival.
