= McMenamins =

Oregon company

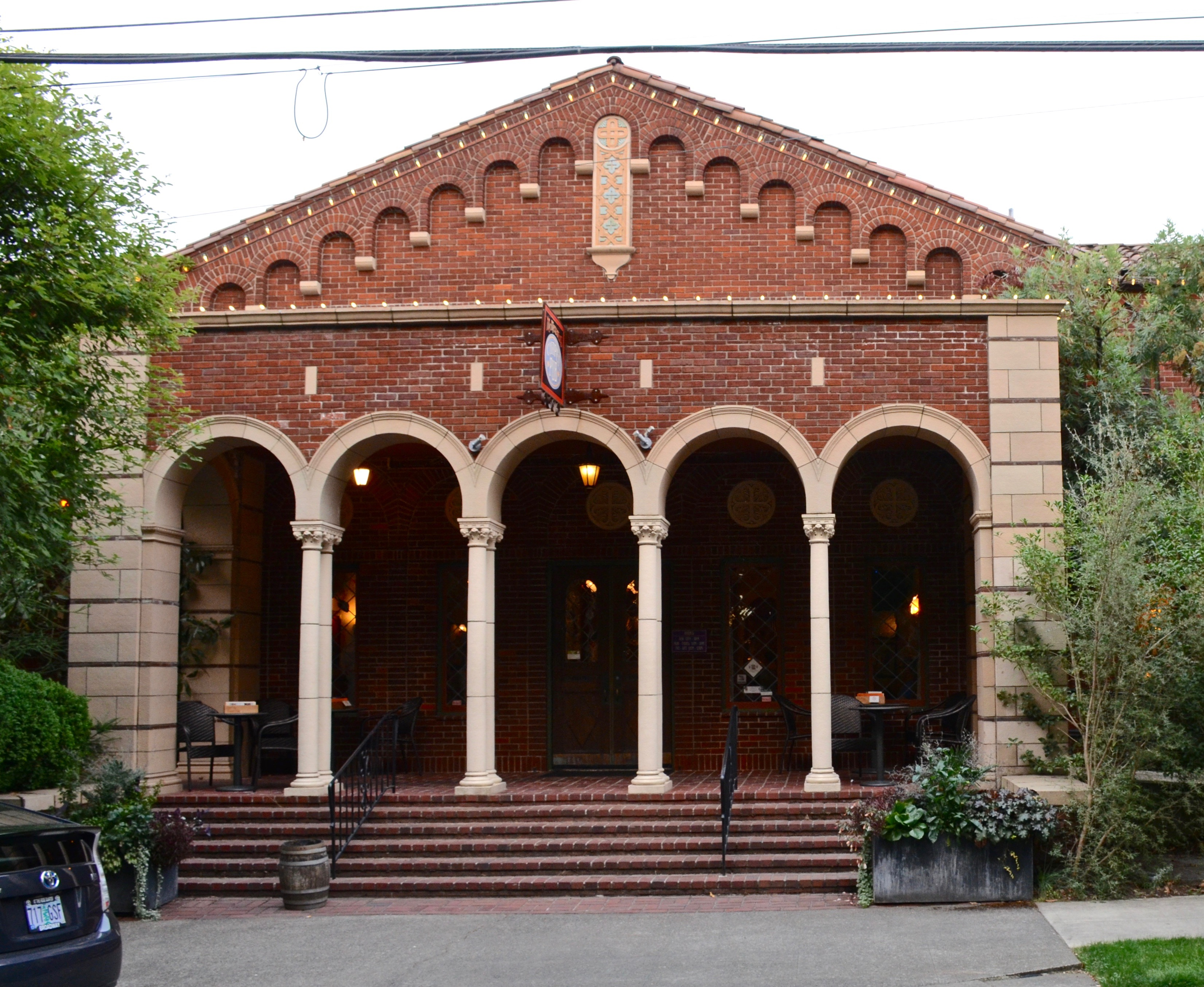
- McMenamins headquarters in Portland, Oregon
- Type: Private
- Industry: Hospitality; Restaurants; Bars
- Founded: July 7, 1983; 43 years ago in Portland, Oregon, U.S.
- Founder: Mike McMenamin; Brian McMenamin
- Headquarters: 430 N. Killingsworth Street, Portland, Oregon, United States
- Number of locations: 56
- Area served: Oregon; Washington
- Products: Hotels, restaurants, pubs, breweries, movie theaters, music venues, golf courses.
- Revenue: US $200 million annually
- Owner: Mike McMenamin (Co-majority owner); Brian McMenamin (Co-majority owner)
- Number of employees: 2,700
- Website: mcmenamins.com

McMenamins is an American chain of pubs, restaurants, hotels, breweries, and other entertainment venues in Oregon and Washington. McMenamins is notable for rehabilitating historic properties for many of their establishments, and several are listed on the National Register of Historic Places.

In addition to pubs, restaurants, hotels, and breweries, McMenamins also operates movie theaters, music venues, spas, and golf courses, including the Gearhart Golf Links, the oldest golf course west of the Mississippi River. McMenamins is credited by some for helping with the popularization of tater tots as bar food, which were invented in Oregon and are offered at every McMenamin's location in either regular or 'Cajun' style.

== History ==
=== Foundation and early years ===
McMenamins was founded by brothers Mike and Brian McMenamin, who were raised in northeast Portland. They trace the beginning of McMenamins to the 1974 opening of Produce Row Café. In 1983, the brothers opened their first brewpub on SE Hawthorne. The Barley Mill featured a very heavy barley mill (originally used as a kitty litter grinder) rescued from Oregon’s first microbrewery, the Cartwright Brewery (1980-1982). Then in 1985, McMenamins opened Oregon's first brewpub in southwest Portland's Hillsdale neighborhood. Their first theater pub was the Mission Theater & Pub (1987). By 1997, food accounted for over half of McMenamins' total sales.

=== 2020-present ===
Approximately 3,000 staff were laid off upon the arrival of the COVID-19 pandemic. While still primarily family-owned, in May 2020 McMenamins began raising $20 million from private investors in a Preferred Stock Offering to retire short-term debt as a result of COVID-19 shutdowns, to fund "secret projects" and to enable future expansion. This was the first time the company had opened direct investment in McMenamins, Inc. to those outside the McMenamin family. The private equity offering conferred preferred shares at $100,000 each in private placements to 150 to 200 high-income individuals. The shares do not carry voting rights for their holders but McMenamins indicated that investors could expect a 3 percent annual cumulative dividend and a 6.5 percent overall return. The decision to open McMenamins to outside investors was in-part driven by impacts from COVID-19 with total revenue for McMenamins down 50 percent in the first 5 months of 2020.

McMenamins was the victim of a ransomware attack in 2021. In 2022, McMenamins had 62 hotels, theaters, and eateries in Oregon and Washington, as well as approximately 2,700 employees. The business was valued at approximately $180 million in 2024.

In January 2024, the United States Department of Labor accused McMenamins of unlawfully requiring servers at its Edgefield and Cedar Hills locations to share tips with assistant managers, totaling over $800,000 over a three-year period from 2019 to 2022. McMenamins disputed the findings, stating that the assistant managers were hourly, non-exempt employees entitled to participate in the tip pool. The Department of Labor requested repayment but McMenamins refused; denying wrongdoing. The department subsequently determined the case was not suitable for litigation, and the fine is not enforceable without going through the courts.

== Notable establishments and properties ==
=== Oregon ===
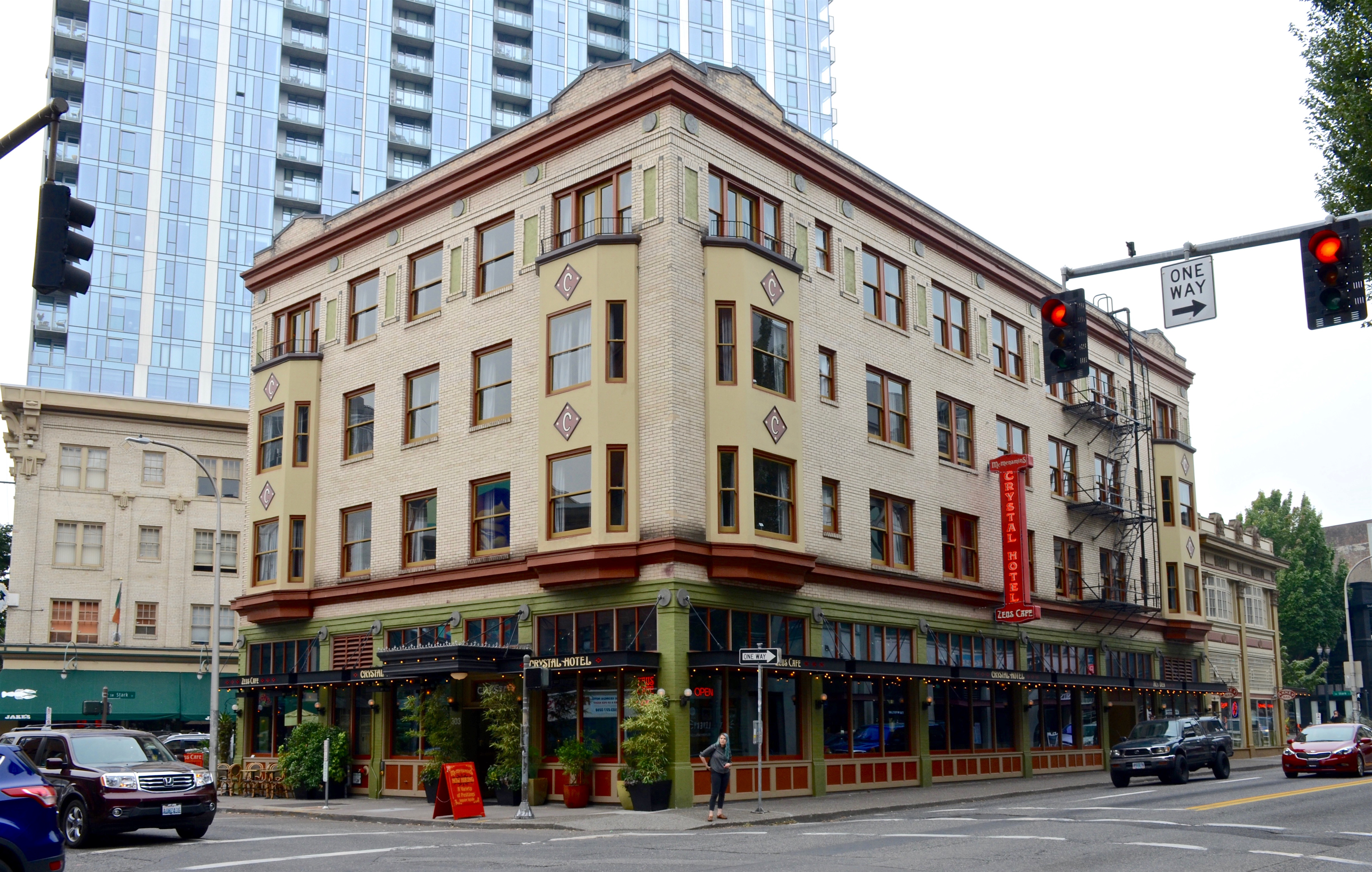
The Crystal Hotel in Portland, Oregon

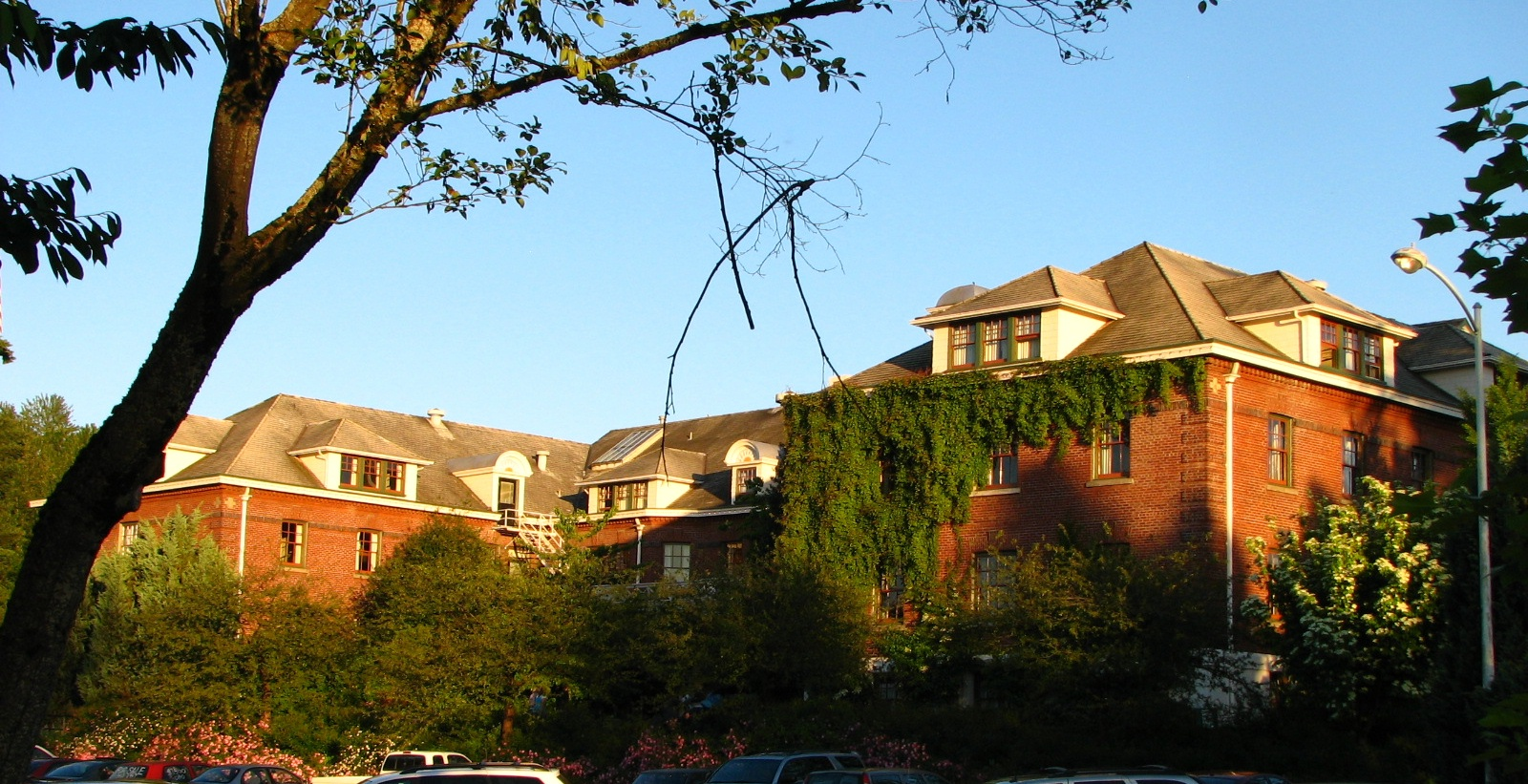
McMenamins Edgefield in the Multnomah County Poor Farm buildings in Troutdale, Oregon

McMenamins establishments in Portland include Back Stage Bar, Bagdad Theatre, Crystal Ballroom, the Crystal Hotel, Kennedy School, Lola's Room, Mission Theater and Pub, and Rams Head Pub. The business also operates in the National Cash Register Building in the St. Johns neighborhood.

McMenamins operates at Imbrie Farm in Hillsboro and in the Boon Brick Store in Salem. The Grand Lodge Hotel and Hotel Oregon operate in Forest Grove and McMinnville, respectively. Edgefield operates at the Multnomah County Poor Farm in Troutdale. McMenamins also operates the Old St. Francis School in Bend.

=== Washington ===
In Washington, McMenamins operates in the Anderson School in Bothell, the Olympic Club Hotel in Centralia, and the Elks Temple in Tacoma.

== Passport program ==
McMenamins has a passport program where visitors get stamps from each McMenamins property. Once all the stamps in a general area are collected, visitors can redeem a prize. People who visit all McMenamins properties are called "Cosmic Tripsters," (or "Tripsters,") and are entitled to certain benefits, discounts, and special parties.

== See also ==
- Wetherspoons, a British chain with similar practices
