= Gearhart Golf Links =

Golf course in Gearhart, Oregon

Coordinates: 46.03297°N 123.92224°W

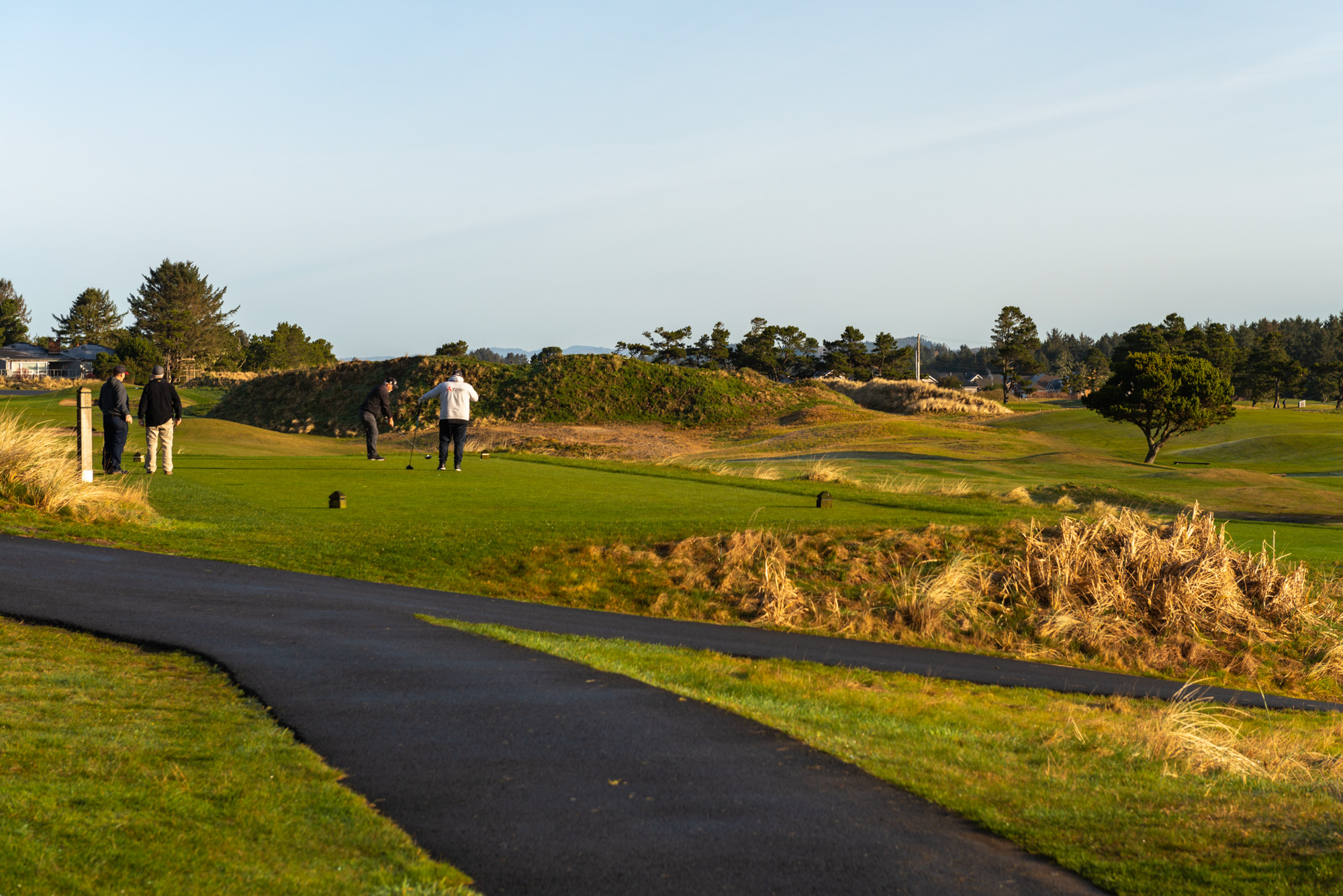
Gearhart Golf Links

Gearhart Golf Links, located in Gearhart, Oregon, United States, is an 18-hole links-style golf course that was initially built in the 1890s.

== History ==
Gearhart Golf Links started with nine holes, the front nine being built in 1892 by the Founders Corporation, while the remaining nine weren't added until 1913. Gearhart Golf Links has been in continual operation since 1892, making it the oldest course west of the Mississippi River. A renovation of the course between 2013 and 2015 aimed to return it to its original open links-style, by removing a large number of trees.
