= Old St. Francis School =

McMenamins Old St. Francis School
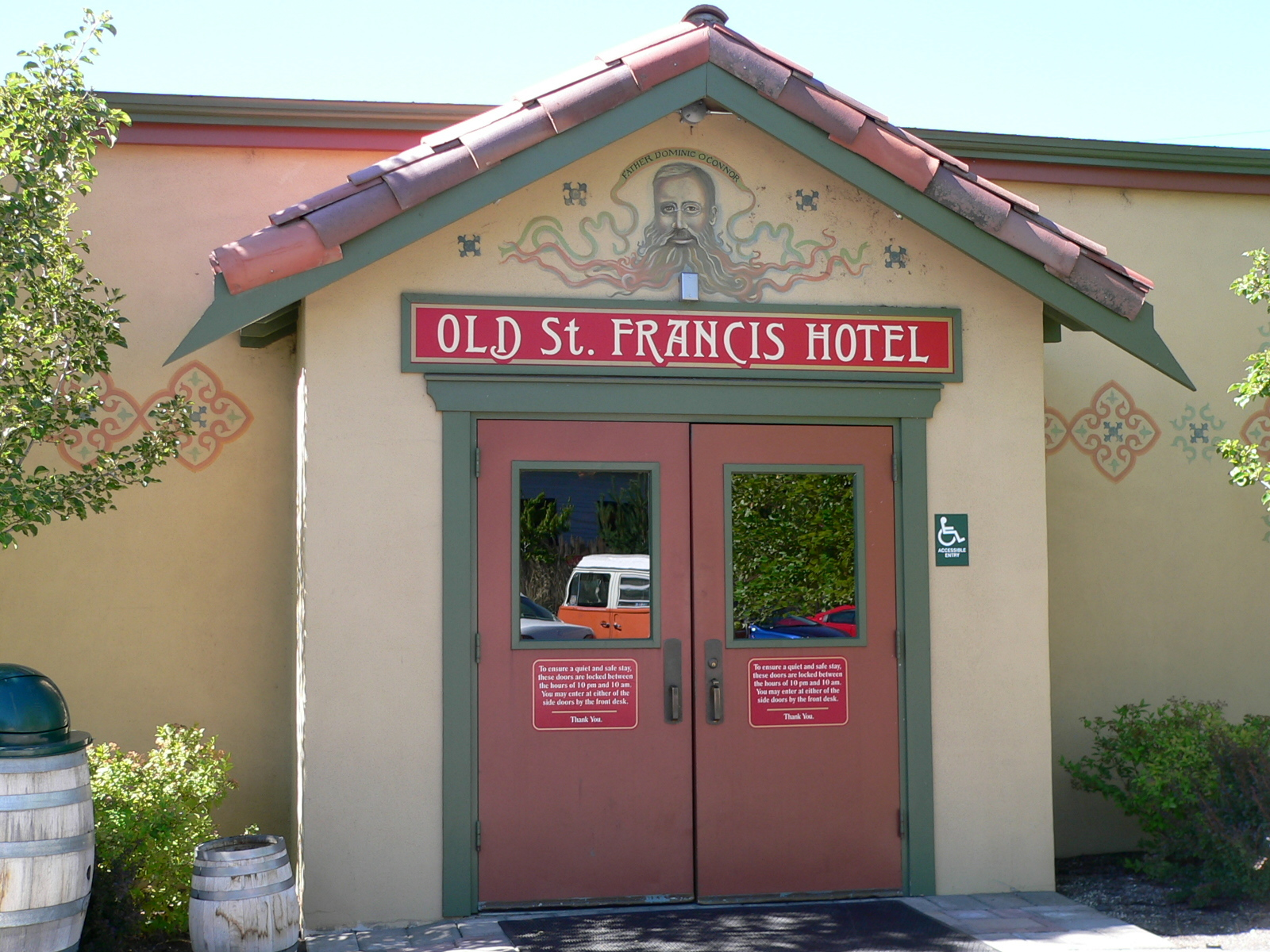
- Old St. Francis Hotel in 2007

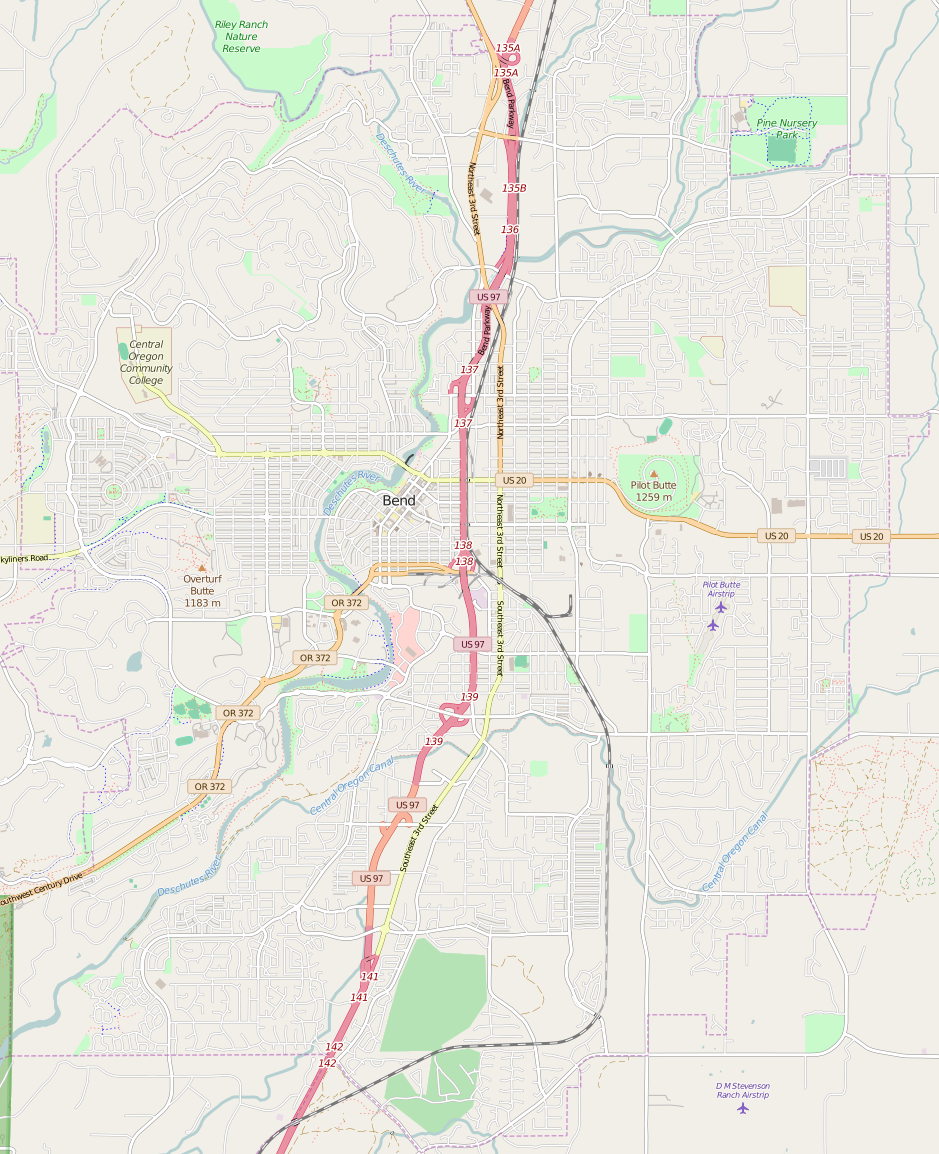
- Location within Bend OR Location within Oregon
- Alternative names: McMenamins Old St. Francis Hotel; McMenamins Pub and Brewery
- Hotel chain: McMinamins

General information
- Type: Hotel, restaurant, and pub
- Location: Bend, Oregon, USA, 700 N.W. Bond Street
- Coordinates: 44°03′24″N 121°18′52″W
- Opened: 1936
- Renovated: 1953, 1968, and 2004

Other information
- Number of rooms: 19
- Number of suites: 4
- Number of restaurants: 1
- Number of bars: 1
- Facilities: Soaking pool; movie theater; brewery; and bakery

St. Francis School in Bend, Oregon, was designed by Hugh Thompson and planned for the site of the Catholic parish house, adjoining St. Francis Catholic Church. It was budgeted at $45,000 ($35,000 for the building and $10,000 for equipment). The two-story structure was planned to face Lava Road and was to include four classrooms, an assembly hall, and a principal's room on the first floor with two more classrooms and a "large parish hall" on the second floor "to be used by altar societies, the Knights of Columbus and by children's organizations of the parish."

The parish house was to be moved to the rear of the house and construction to begin at once in May 1925 for opening during the next school year. A playground was also planned and four "teaching sisters" of the order of St. Joseph expected to come and teach students up to eighth grade. The school was said to be the only one of its kind in Central Oregon, while there was a "parochial academy at Klamath Falls." The new school had been discussed "for a number of years, even before the new Catholic church replaced the old structure." Meanwhile, in 1925, "Bend School" graduated the largest class in its history, 58 students, with an invocation from St. Francis church's Father Luke Sheehan. According to the website of the building's current owners, an addition of two classrooms was made in 1953. An expansion to the school was planned in 1959. The current owner's website also reports on a major parish center expansion in 1968 with gym, stage, meeting rooms, and cafeteria.

== Currently ==
In 2000 the school relocated to a "modern campus" in the northeastern section of town and the old downtown property including "four old bungalow houses on the back end of the lot" was transferred to McMenamins. The hotel and restaurant chain "renovated and reopened the school in November 2004" with a "respectful celebration of its past and newfound sense of fun" as pub, hotel, and guest houses.

McMenamins completed an additional property renovation in 2016 to total 60 guestrooms, a pub, brewery, private meeting and event space, live music venue, onsite theater, and soaking pool. Two additional buildings—the Art House and Ed House—have been constructed on the property. Both additional buildings feature original art from local artists in the guestrooms, as well as "secret rooms." The property has also become a popular venue for weddings and social events.
