= Multnomah County Poor Farm =

- U.S. National Register of Historic Places
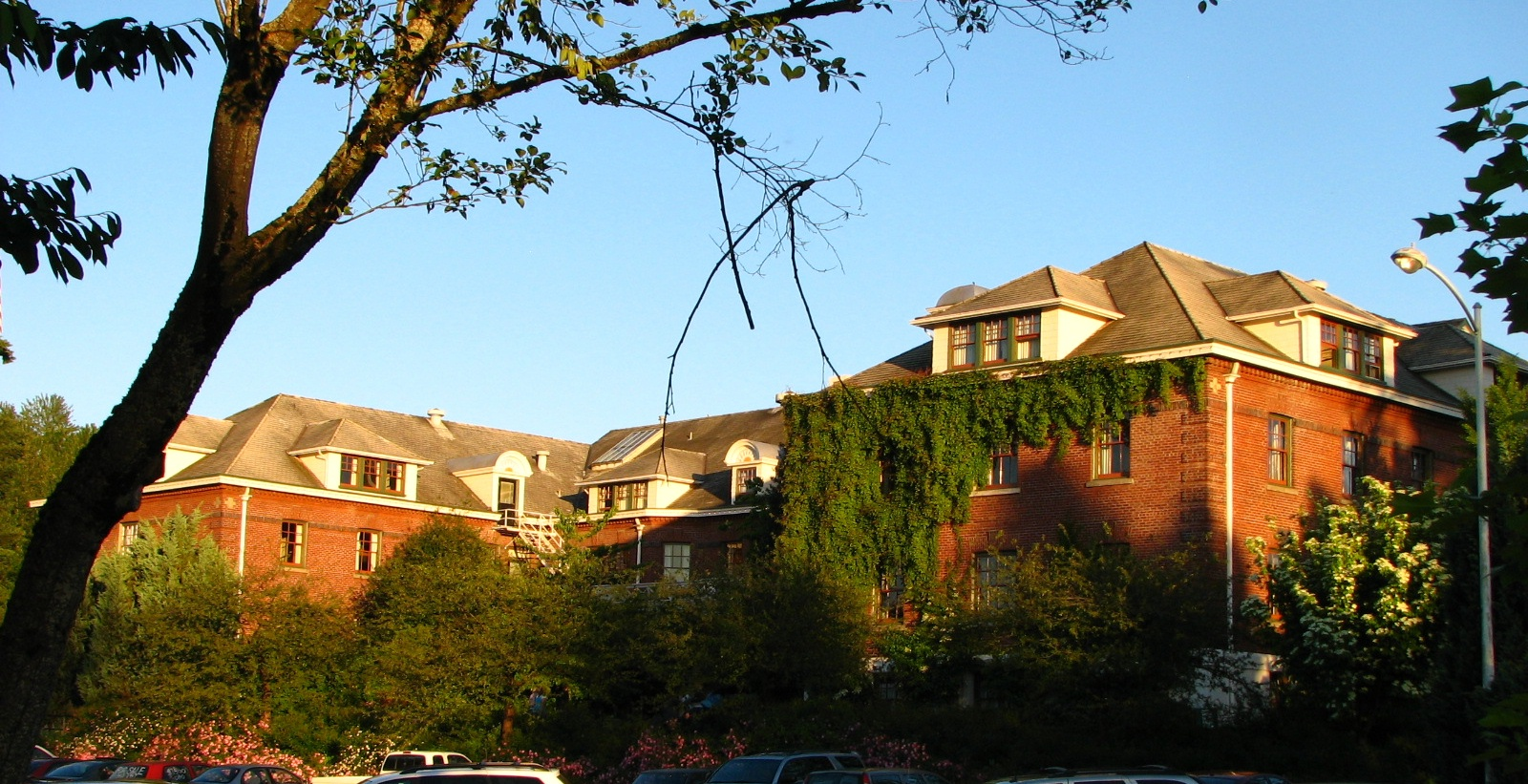
- The Multnomah County Poor Farm in 2008

- Location within Oregon Location within the United States
- Location: 2126 SW Halsey Street; Troutdale, Oregon, U.S.
- Coordinates: 45°32′13″N 122°24′24″W
- Area: 10.7 acres (4.3 ha)
- Built: 1911
- Architect: John Barnett Bridges, Jr. and Fred T. Webber
- Architectural style: Georgian Revival
- NRHP reference No.: 90000844
- Added to NRHP: June 1, 1990

The Multnomah County Poor Farm is a former poor farm located in Troutdale, Oregon, United States. Established in 1911, the building and its surrounding grounds operated as a poor farm housing the ill and indigent populations in the Portland metropolitan area at the beginning of the twentieth century, after the closure of a poor farm in the city's West Hills. Over the course of the century, the farm would come to be used as a nursing home before becoming abandoned in the 1980s.

Since 1990, the site is operated as an entertainment and lodging complex under the name McMenamins Edgefield, one of several historic properties owned, restored, and operated by the McMenamins enterprise. The property is listed on the National Register of Historic Places.

== History ==
=== Establishment ===
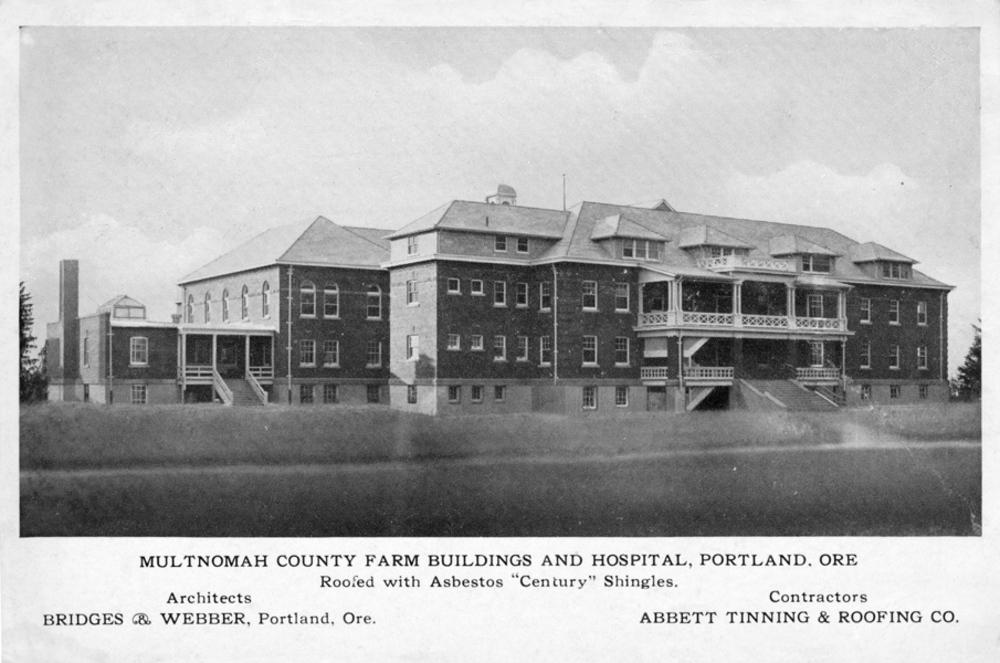
Multnomah County Poor Farm c. 1912.

In 1854 the territorial legislature gave the counties the responsibility of caring for the poor. 1868 saw the first pauper's farm open in the west hills of Portland. This facility, called Hillside Farm, occupied 160 acres (65 ha) near Canyon Road in Portland's West Hills; the site is now part of Washington Park.

Hillside Farm was closed down due to the "deplorable" condition of the building, and the Multnomah County Poor Farm was built to replace it on a budget of USD$100,000 (equivalent to $3,455,357 in 2025). The main building was constructed by a plastering crew as well as Swedish immigrants who worked as carpenters or bricklayers. In November 1911, 211 residents moved to the new farm in Troutdale. This new facility was the largest county-funded relief institution in Oregon. By 1914, the farm housed a total of 302 residents who helped manage various farm animals and crops.

=== Expansion ===
In 1934 an infirmary wing was built to care for the aging population of the farm. In 1935, its population peaked at 614. The farm would eventually encompass 345 acres (140 ha). During 1939, a doctor's duplex was built by the Works Progress Administration (WPA). The WPA also added an incinerator, sprinkler system, and sun porch in 1940. In 1947, the name of the institution was changed to the Multnomah County Home and Farm. In the late 1950s, the farming operation ceased and the name was changed to the Edgefield Manor. In 1964, the property was converted for multi-use, with the main lodge being used as a nursing home, and an external building as the Edgefield Lodge for Emotionally Disturbed Children. The main building became a nursing home, which was named Edgefield Manor. Farm operations also were discontinued during this time. The entire complex was declared as the Edgefield Center by county commissioners in 1964.

=== Dissolution and restoration ===
In 1972, the county proposed closing the entire Edgefield facilities down, and an estimate for necessary renovations made three years later was valued at $400,000. In 1982, the remaining three patients at the facility were relocated before its official closure. During 1985, county committees decided to remove all buildings from the area except for the jail. The reason was to market the land to potential buyers. In 1986, the Troutdale Historical Society challenged the decision to destroy all of the buildings on the property. They claimed that the buildings had historical importance and needed to be preserved. In 1990, Edgefield was named to the National Register of Historic Places. That same year, the facility was purchased by McMenamins. It features restaurants, pubs, gardens, a movie theater, a golf course, wedding locales, and an outdoor concert venue that hosts international musical acts.

== Notable residents ==
- Frankie Baker

== See also ==
- National Register of Historic Places listings in Multnomah County, Oregon

== Notes and references ==
=== References ===
- Stewart, Julie (2012). "The County Poor Farm, Edgefield". Troutdale. Images of America. Arcadia Publishing. ISBN 978-0-7-385-9334-0.
