= George Washington Park (Centralia, Washington) =

Park in Centralia, Washington

- City Park, Main Street Park
- George Washington Park, 2011

- Location within Washington (state) Location within the United States
- Type: City park
- Location: 110 Silver Street, Centralia, Washington
- Coordinates: 46°42′58″N 122°57′22″W
- Area: 2.0 acres (0.81 ha)
- Established: 1881
- Founder: George and Mary Jane Washington
- Administrator: City of Centralia
- Status: Open
- Camp sites: None
- Paths: Paved walking paths
- Terrain: Flat
- Parking: Street parking
- Public transit: Lewis County Transit
- Facilities: Public library

George Washington Park is a 2-acre (0.81 ha) city park located in the Centralia Downtown Historic District of Centralia, Washington. The public square was established in 1881 and was part of the original plat of the town, founded by George and Mary Jane Washington in 1875. Into the 20th century, the grounds were also known as City Park and Main Street Park.

The site, home to a large number and variety of trees, is home to the city's Carnegie library, built in 1913, and a notable feature within the park is an octagonal gazebo.

George Washington is honored at the park with several memorials, including a stone monument and plaque, and a life-size family sculpture that includes his wife Mary Jane, and their dog, Rockwood. Local and national historical events, as well as military veterans who served or died in times of war, are memorialized at the park. Monuments and plaques include a marker to recognize a campaign stop by President Bill Clinton, the Freedom Walk Memorial, and a plaque remembering the September 11, 2001 terrorist attacks.

The American Legion military parade that became part of the Centralia Tragedy in November 1919 originated from the park. In memory of the Armistice Day Riot, the park contains the American Legion sculpture, The Sentinel, and an International Workers of the World granite-block memorial.

In the 21st century, George Washington Park has been a central site in the city for celebrations, such as an annual Juneteenth festival and a Founder's Day event held every August; the city holds a Christmas tree lighting ceremony every year on the grounds. Local and national protests are often organized at the park and vandalism, along with the use of the grounds by homeless people, have been ongoing issues for the city.

== Background ==
George Washington was the fourth known American settler in Lewis County, staking a 640-acre (260 ha) Donation Land Claim at the junction of the Chehalis and Skookumchuck rivers in 1852, attempting to find a "decent place in the world" free from discrimination. Washington's land claim was originally placed under Anna and James Cochran(e), a white family that had raised George since near his birth. At the time, the area was under the governance of the Oregon Territory, which did not allow Black people to own or settle land. The Cochran's deeded the land back to Washington in 1856, who had "proved up" the claim over the four-year period, which included the construction of a cabin and a farm. The area was now part of the Washington Territory, which had no laws prohibiting Black ownership.

Washington and his wife, Mary Jane, originally established and platted the town of Centerville in 1875; the Washington's are recorded as founding the largest city in the United States by a Black couple. The community became known as Centralia in 1883 and was open to all settlers; Washington offered lots for sale to any new resident for $10 (equivalent to $345.54 in 2025). The Washington's never intended the town to be a Black settlement nor a harbor for those attempting to escape segregation. George Washington, who became known as "Uncle George" to local schoolchildren, had thought that "his townspeople" should be not be judged or respected based solely on skin color, but by "individual merit".

Born out of celebrating Washington's 200th birthday in August 2017, the city officially declared in 2023 that every August 15th was to be known as Founder's Day. An annual Founder's Day celebration is held at the park during the month; the first event was held on August 12, 2023.

== History ==
George Washington Park is situated on one of the original platted parcels in the early town of Centerville. The grounds were planned by the Washington's to be for use as a public square in 1881; the site was first known as City Park and also as Main Street Park.

The day George Washington died in 1905, an annual meeting for the Soldiers and Pioneer Association of Lewis County was being held at the park. The "father of Chehalis", William West, who was witness to the Washington's submitted plat for Centralia, was in attendance. A school band from the Washington State Reform School performed and it has been theorized that Washington may have heard the music during his last hours from his home blocks away on Chestnut Street.

View of George Washington Park and fountain, c. 1914

View of park and Carnegie Library, c. 1918-1920

The city's Carnegie library was built on the grounds in 1913. During the mid-1910s, the park was reported to be used by young women for immoral means, using the bandstand for "spooning in the dark" and the grounds as a meeting place for "love-making" that failed the "rules of ordinary propriety". The Women's Civic Club of Centralia volunteered oversight, maintenance, and upkeep of the park in 1916. The group began to "beautify" the grounds, organizing other volunteers and businesses to help in the effort. An ongoing issue regarding rubbish led the city to install four trash cans, along with signs that asked visitors to not "throw trash on the lawn". The club also hired a man to clean George Washington Park every morning.

In the latter part of the 1910s, plans at the site included the build of a city hall in 1919 and a city jail. The prison was to be designed with a flat roof so it could be used for band performances; neither building was constructed.

An elm tree in honor of World War I soldiers related to members of the Centralia branch of the Washington State Federation of Women's Clubs was planted on the grounds in June 1919. The American Legion military parade that became part of the Centralia Tragedy in November 1919 began from the park.

A marble bench was created in Washington's honor and included the inscription, "In memory of George Washington, donor of this park". The bench was formally accepted by the city and dedicated during a ceremony on Memorial Day, 1922. The bench was "smashed in half by Halloween hoodlums" in 1928; the seat remained broken into the next year and was removed. The bench was restored and reinstalled at the park where it remained for decades. (Note: The year the 1922 George Washington bench was repaired and placed back at the park is not specifically listed in current sources. The seat was noted to still be at the park by 1971.) Three city departments helped to create and install a new iron flag pole at the park in 1923.

Vice-president Charles G. Dawes, in the city as part of an invitation from the American Legion, gave a speech at the park in September 1925. Standing at the base of The Sentinel, he was reported to speak briefly but patriotically, and the crowd of "several thousand" was noted to have given Dawes an "enthusiastic welcome".

A Kwanzan cherry tree was planted on the grounds in 1965 as part of a "Roots of Friendship" program with Kobe, Japan. Shrubs and other plants from the park were transplanted to other recreation sites in the city during an expansion of the library in 1977. A new irrigation system was installed during the efforts. In July, the park was closed down until the expansion project was completed due to increased vandalism. Six maple trees were cut down due to a combination of rot and a root system that interfered with the expanded footprint of the library. Replaced with honey locust, the maples were used as firewood at Fort Borst Park. Maples were still noted to be growing around the perimeter of the park.

=== 21st century ===
A community organization in Lewis County, known as Members of Open Arms, began tacking cold-weather clothing, such as hats, mittens, and scarves, to trees in the park in January 2017; the items were meant for homeless people in Centralia. The effort, though supported by some elected officials, left behind staples that could have potentially caused damage to the trees; as the action was also against city code, the clothes were removed. The group apologized to the city council the next week, admitting to going "overboard".

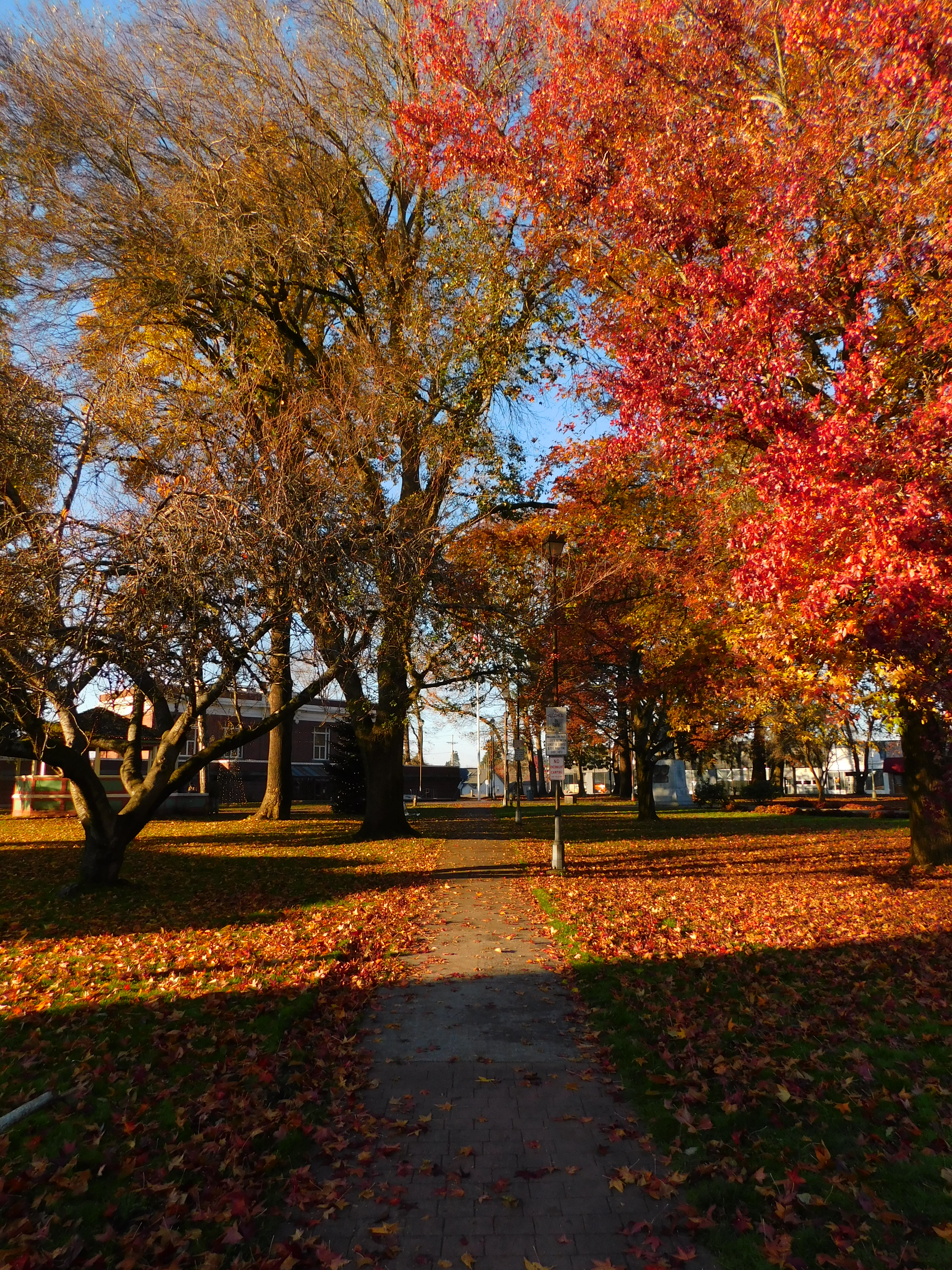
George Washington Park, 2023

The city's first official celebration of Juneteenth was held at George Washington Park in 2021. Focused around Washington's plaque memorial on the grounds, the event included historical accounts of the Washingtons and the holiday, as well as music and poetry readings from Black artists. A city councilman was recorded to have been "dumbfounded" that Centralia went "so long without formally celebrating the holiday" considering the establishment of the community by a Black family.

Ongoing issues of homeless people sheltering in the park by 2023 led to the installation of a surveillance camera. During the same year, in an effort to lower criminal activity, homeless residency, and rule-breaking in any Centralia park, the parks department was granted powers through a city ordinance that "temporarily or permanently ban[s] individuals and groups from city parks". By July 2025, 20 people had been officially excluded from George Washington Park; the parks department noted that not all the exclusion orders were directed towards homeless persons.

Approximately $900 in damages to the park's lawn occurred in July 2023 after a vehicle drove through the grounds, creating donut patterns in the grass. Several people were almost hit during the weekday afternoon incident. The driver was apprehended and charged days later, apologizing for the incident after admitting he "had a moment".

=== Protests ===
Organized protests in the 21st century at George Washington Park include a demonstration and vigil that began in 2001 against the Iraq War. Originally begun by a group of eight that lacked any formal leadership, the protest was reported to have been held continuously every Saturday into 2011. An Occupy Wall Street protest was held in October the same year.

A gathering in opposition to police brutality occurred in May 2020 following the murder of George Floyd. Centralia was one of 75 cities in the United States to hold such a protest.

The park was part of a larger, regional and state-wide No Kings protest in October 2025. A minor counter-protest was present for moments throughout the day, but the overall event was noted to be without incidents and "joyful despite the serious theme of the protest". A demonstration and vigil was held on the grounds in January 2026 after the killing of Renée Good. The park was the site of the March 2026 No Kings protests; the following month a dissent as part of the Communities Not Cages National Day of Action to Stop ICE Warehouse Detention was organized at the park.

== Geography ==
George Washington Park, alternate view, 2023

George Washington Park is located in the center of Centralia, Washington. The 2-acre (0.81 ha) grounds are situated near the downtown business core, also known as the Centralia Downtown Historic District. The park is contained in one square block bordered by Harrison, Main, and Pearl streets. The city's Carnegie Public Library is located within the grounds.

The square is surrounded by commercial office buildings and across from the Centralia Post Office, an historic building listed on the National Register of Historic Places (NRHP).

== Features and amenities ==
A main feature of the park is a bandstand and gazebo, erected in the 1920s; the gazebo is possibly the second of its type in the same location on the grounds. Located in the northwest section of the park, the octagonal structure was noted at the time of its construction to be 10 feet (3.0 m)-tall to the platform, which was accessed by a small door under the floor and a set of stairs. At the time of a major renovation of the structure in 2006, the gazebo featured a cedar shake roof and a beadboard ceiling from which a single light was hung. By the 2000s, the roof had deteriorated and water leaks were common. Labor included the replacement of rotted wooden posts, the floor of the bandstand, and other portions that had noticeable decay. Other efforts of the estimated $5,600 (equivalent to $8,944 in 2025) project included an upgrade to a multiple light system for the bandstand.

First gazebo, early 1900s

Gazebo, 1923

Gazebo, 2011

The park contains a variety of trees; by 2020, the park was listed to have a minimum of 39 trees during a city-wide study.

=== Extinct features ===
Fountain, c. 1909

The park once contained a fountain which was noted to be in existence as early as 1907; the feature was refurbished with new paint and a "spray put in" in 1919. By the 1950s, the fountain was stocked with goldfish; households in Centralia were called to donate "spare" fish in 1951. The fountain was noted to no longer exist by 1971.

A white fence surrounded the park before the addition of the fountain. The barrier was noted to have been installed to prevent damages from livestock, which at the turn of the 20th century, were allowed to freely roam the streets of Centralia.

The city's Rotary Club installed a children's wading pool at the park in 1948. Before the 1970s, the pool was filled in due to ongoing vandalism and the area became a garden bed.

A playground area was noted to be in existence in 1977 during the Carnegie library expansion.

== Public art and monuments ==
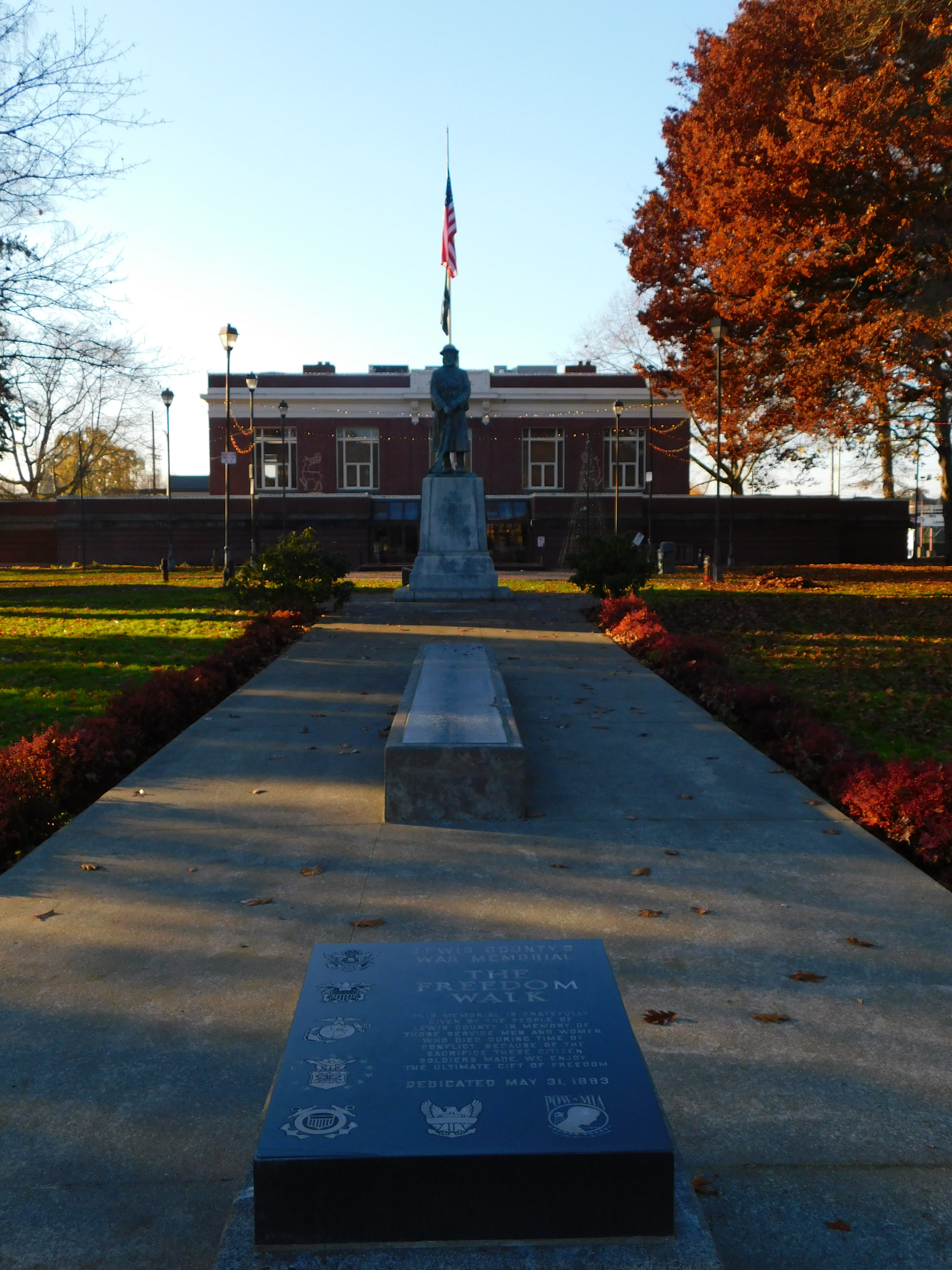
Freedom Walk, 2023

Restoration efforts to the Freedom Walk Memorial and The Sentinel were completed in May 2023. Undertaken by a local bricklayers union, the statue's stone foundation was repaired after freezing water had caused several cracks and other damages; grout was replaced at the memorial, which was also cleaned.

=== Bill Clinton campaign stop marker ===
A monument authorized by the city in remembrance of a September 19, 1996 campaign stop in Centralia by Bill Clinton and Al Gore was dedicated in the park in May 2008. The 4 foot (1.2 metres) black granite marker had been installed at the park in late-2007. The $5,000 (equivalent to $10,028 in 2025) cost was covered by the Sticklin Funeral Chapel of Centralia.

=== Freedom Walk Memorial ===
As part of an effort to expand The Sentinel into a larger memorial within the park, the city added the Freedom Walk War Memorial in 1993. The monument is constructed of an American black granite slab that individually honors all Lewis County veterans who perished during wars or military engagements since World War I. As of 2023, the war memorial is carved to list 355 veterans killed in action.

An original slab of the memorial was donated for use as a skateboarding feature at the Twin City Skate Park at Riverside Park in 2007. Known as the Memorial Ledge, the granite piece had been damaged by skateboarders while at George Washington Park.

=== George and Mary Jane Washington statue ===
Park grounds with George and Mary Jane Washington statue, 2025

The city began raising money to create a statue in Washington's honor around the 200th anniversary of his birthday; initial funds were estimated to be $100,000. (Note: During fundraising for the George and Mary Jane Washington statue, McMenamins Olympic Club matched every dollar spent on beverages, food, and movies at their location.) Along with local fundraising for the artwork, which included a $30,000 donation from the Orin Smith Family Foundation, $75,000 was provided by the state's capital budget. Another $55,000 was raised by local residents; funds leftover from the project were added to a Centralia College endowment known as the George & Mary Jane Washington Scholarship.

The multi-piece, bronze artwork was installed in front of the park on Pearl Street on August 11, 2018; (Note: Originally, the George and Mary Jane Washington statue was meant to have been placed on a bench in the middle of the park next to George's monument plaque near the library. The $2,000 "doesn't look like much" bench had been donated by a mayor of Centralia before the artwork had been authorized.) a party and official dedication was held two days later at the conclusion of the city's years-long bicentennial celebration. The ceremony was attended by state senator John Braun and a representative of Maria Cantwell, who furnished an American flag that had flown over the United States Capitol.

The life-size sculpture includes a standing likeness of George Washington, with one of his arms draped over a depiction of Mary Jane who is seated on a marble bench; George's other arm is described as "outstretched towards his city" and meant to be shaken. (Note: The marble bench featuring Mary Jane's sculpture was intentionally built for people to sit and "visit" with the Washingtons. The bench was also built to mirror the first Washington bench from 1922.) In front of the couple is a sculpture of their dog, Rockwood. (Note: The artist of the George and Mary Jane Washington statue admitted to depicting George "a little younger", believing that Centralia's founder "would like that". The dog was included because he "has got to be there I guess".) The statue was created by Adna, Washington artist, Jim Stafford, who implemented a rubber and ceramic molding process and lost-wax casting. The initial plans had the Washingtons gazing towards downtown Centralia; the artwork was redesigned to have George "pointing to the distance" with Mary Jane depicted as pointing to a "plot map" while looking up towards her husband.

As the statue was placed "far enough away" from the George Washington monument and unmarked, a plaque to denote the Washingtons, which also included two inscribed quotes by George, was added in 2019.

=== George Washington monument ===
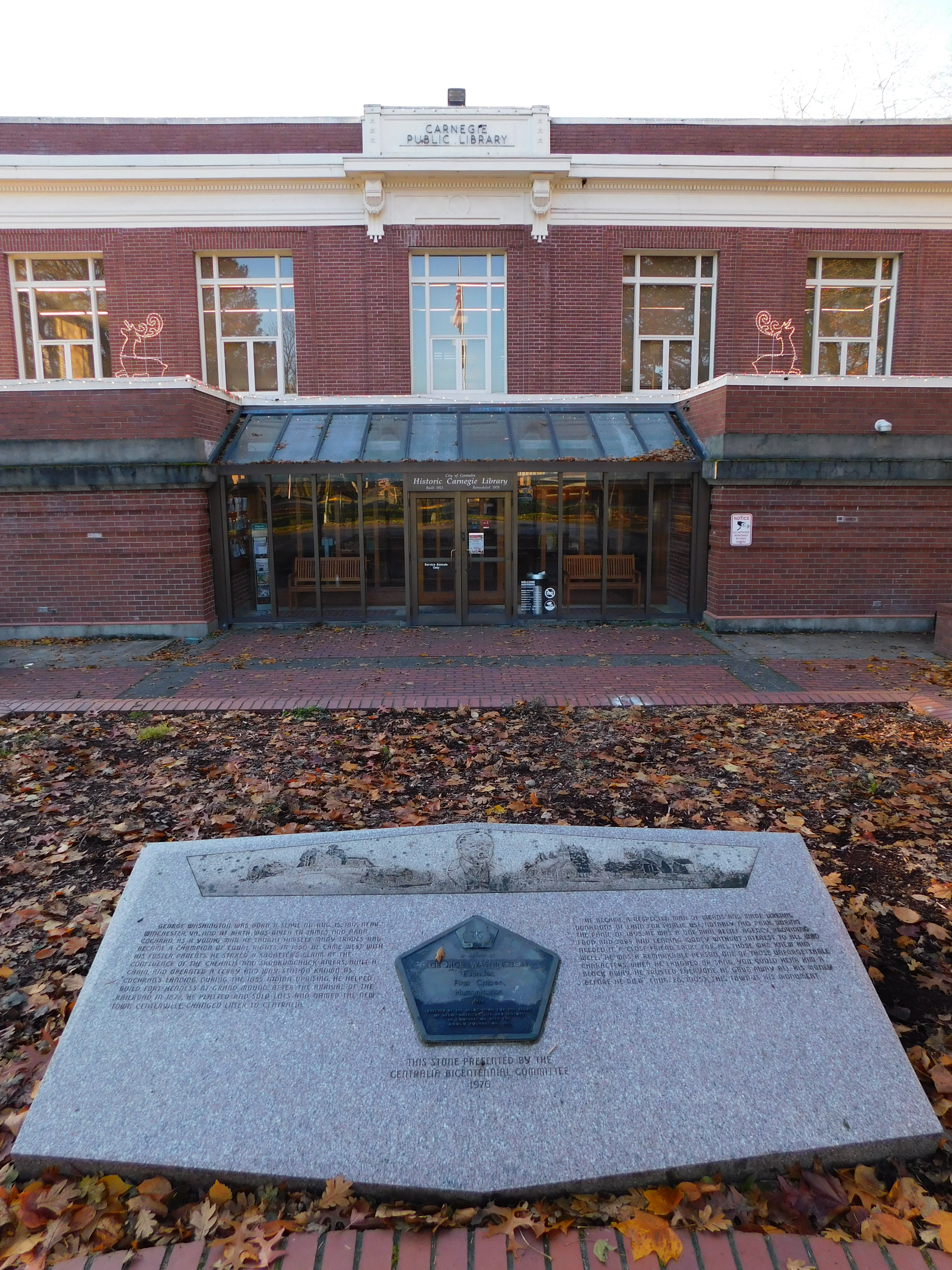
George Washington plaque and Centralia's Carnegie Library, 2023

A polished granite monument honoring Washington is located near the front entrance of the Centralia Public Library. The memorial, which also features a bronze plaque, was installed on November 9, 1979. The work contains an engraved portrait of Washington and early buildings in Centralia. The stone is engraved with inscriptions detailing his life history. Also included is a quote from one of his last friends and the statement, "This town [Centralia] is his monument".

The affixed plaque had been installed previously during a United States Bicentennial celebration on October 22, 1976. The city and the state declared the day to be "George Washington Day". The 17-inch (43 cm) marker, sponsored by the Association for the Study of African American Life and History, was the eleventh plaque to be installed as part of nationwide series to commemorate one hundred Black pioneers. The plaque was inscribed with the phrase, "Founder, First Citizen, Humanitarian". The dedication included speaker, Charles F. Stafford, and a choir performance from students as Centralia High School.

=== International Workers of the World memorials ===
The Sentinel, 2016

There were several attempts to add an International Workers of the World (IWW)) memorial near The Sentinel to honor the deaths of IWW members due to the Centralia Tragedy; early undertakings also focused on the IWW's history of the events. The first recognition of the IWW was a small plaque installed by the organization west of The Sentinel, not long after the doughboy sculpture was dedicated in 1924.

Located across from the park on a building that was once an Elks Lodge is a mural supporting the IWW. Created by Mike Alewitz, the artwork, known as The Resurrection of Wesley Everest, was dedicated in December 1997. The work portrays IWW member, Wesley Everest, as both a military man and laborer, surrounded by various symbolic scenes connected to IWW causes and beliefs.

A potential IWW memorial, meant to be erected in time for the 100th anniversary of the Armistice Day Riot, was presented in 2018, but the effort was postponed due to disagreements on the location and the proposed text to be added to the marker. A bronze plaque was finally authorized and a formal dedication was held on November 11, 2023. The plaque, with the notation, "For defending their Union Hall", lists the ten IWW "Wobblies" who died during the Centralia Tragedy or were imprisoned in the aftermath. A rededication was held in June 2024 after the plaque was installed on a 7,500 lb (3,400 kg) granite block base (Note: The granite block for the IWW memorial was quarried in Vietnam.) that was located to the back of The Sentinel, roughly to the northwest. The color and carved style was an intentional match to the base of the American Legion statue; the work was done by a local business, Centralia Monument. The memorial became known as the Union Victims monument. Fundraising and labor for the $20,000 project was done mostly by union organizations and workers.

=== The Sentinel ===
A statue known as The Sentinel resides in the midpoint of the park and is a memorial to four slain members of the American Legion who died during the Armistice Day Riot in Centralia on November 11, 1919.. Seattle sculptor, Alonzo Victor Lewis, created the artwork which was dedicated on the grounds in November 1924. The sculpture was added to the National Register of Historic Places in 1991. (Note: The National Register of Historic Places designation only applies to The Sentinel and a small, 25-square-foot (2.3 m^{2}) surrounding lawn that no longer exists. The listing excludes any other memorial within George Washington Park, even those pertaining to the Armistice Day Riot.)

=== September 11, 2001 plaque ===
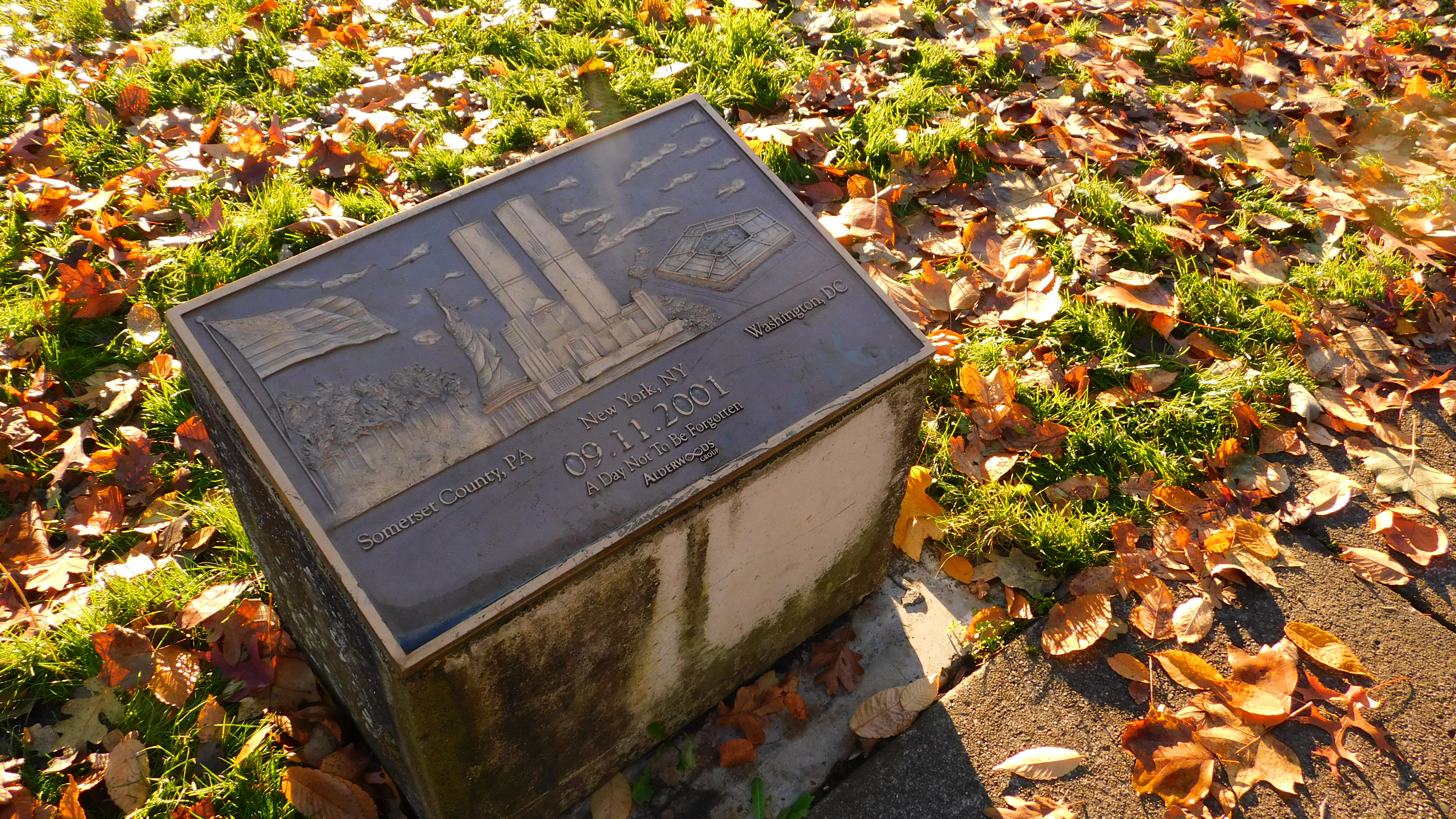
September 11th memorial, 2023

Located amid other memorials in the park is a plaque commemorating the September 11, 2001 terrorist attacks. The bronze memorial is 18 by 24 inches (460 mm × 610 mm) and features a depiction of the United 93 crash site in Shanksville, Pennsylvania, and pre-attack versions of The Pentagon and the Twin Towers, which are situated amongst the New York City skyline. Additional motifs include a large American flag and the Statue of Liberty. Along with the date of the attack, 9-11-2001, a further inscription states, "A Day Not To Be Forgotten".

The plaque was installed at the park on September 11, 2002. A copy of the plaque, meant for the city of Chehalis, was forgotten until it was relocated at a mortuary in 2011.

=== Other memorials ===
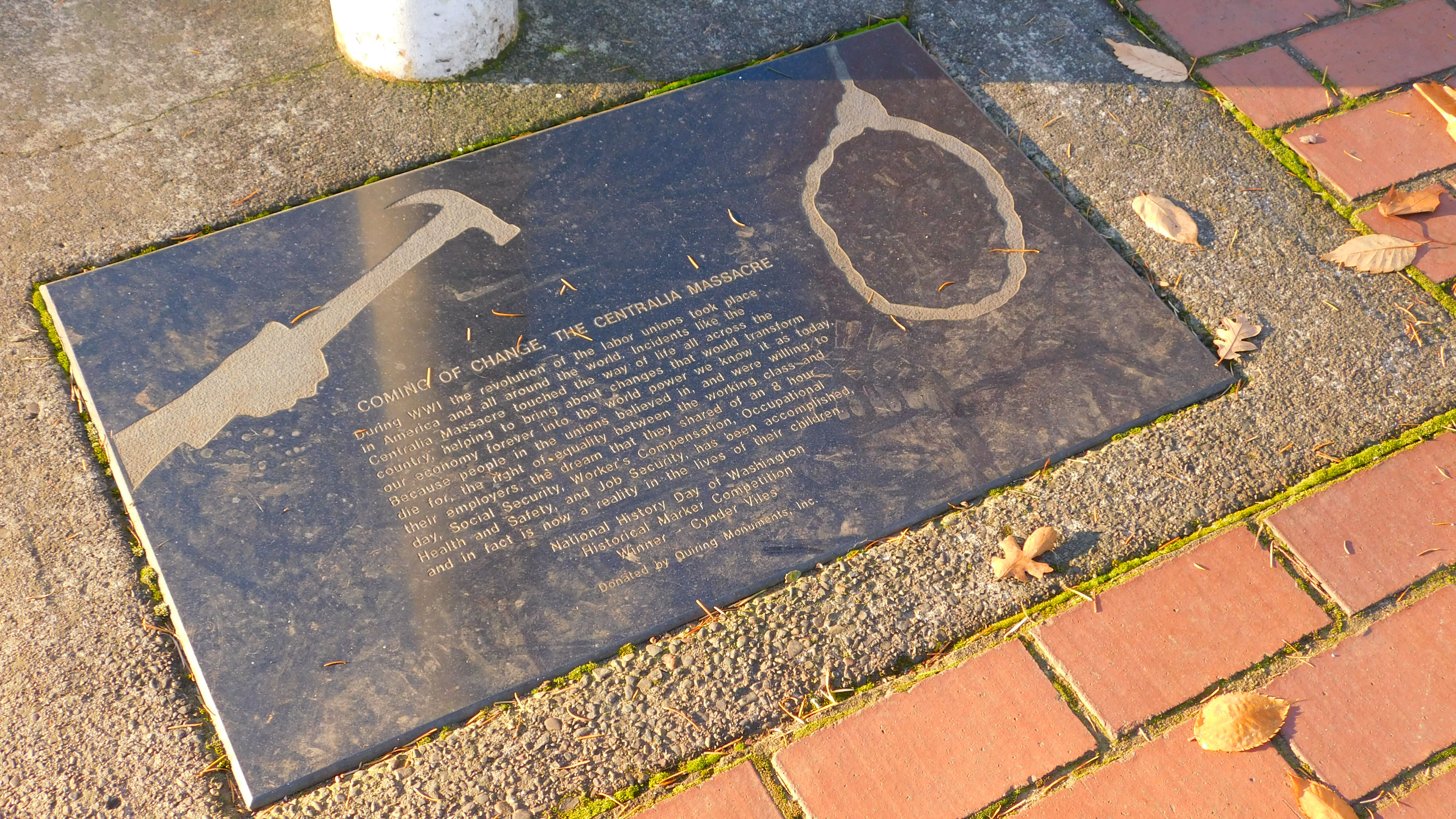
Union and labor movement plaque, 2023

After the Resurrection of Wesley Everest mural was unveiled in 1997, an unknown person placed a plaque at the base of the park's flag pole. In favor of the labor movement, the marker mentions several key components of union labor, including 8-hour work days, guaranteed compensation, health and retirement benefits, and job security.

Other artworks depicting or dedicated to Washington include a portrait inside the library and a nearby two-story mural of George and his dog, Rockwood, located a block north of the grounds on Pearl Street. The mural, painted by Puyallup artist Darrell Harlow, was unveiled in October 1996. The bottom half was removed by a local painter and restored in 2017.

A temporary exhibit, known as Arlington Northwest, was featured at the park in 2008. The display contained a memorial of crosses and markers, some unnamed, in honor of soldiers who died during the Afghanistan and Iraq wars.

== Festivals and events ==
A bicycle event for local residents in the Twin Cities, (Note: Centralia and Chehalis are known as the Twin Cities. See respective articles for more information.) known as the Centralia to Chehalis Bike Ride, was held continuously from the late 20th century into the 2000s. The "C to C" route began at the park, coursing around the Chehalis–Centralia Airport and residential neighborhoods. The finish line was at the Recreation Park Complex in Chehalis.

The city's chamber of commerce began a summer season "Music in the Park" weekend show in 2001. Due to lack of sponsors for the event, the series ended before the 2009 season. The four-show event was restarted by 2017.

George Washington Park is home to Centralia's annual Christmas tree lighting ceremony.
