= Olympic Hotel =

Olympic Hotel may refer to:

- Fairmont Olympic Hotel (Seattle) or Olympic Hotel, a hotel in Seattle, Washington, U.S.
- Olympic Club Hotel, a hotel in Centralia, Washington, U.S.
- Olympic Hotel, Sydney, a hotel in Paddington, New South Wales.
- Olympic Hotel, Tehran, a facility at the Azadi Sport Complex
- Olympic Hotel, the setting of the British sitcom Heartburn Hotel
