= Olympic Club Hotel =

Historic hotel in Centralia, Washington

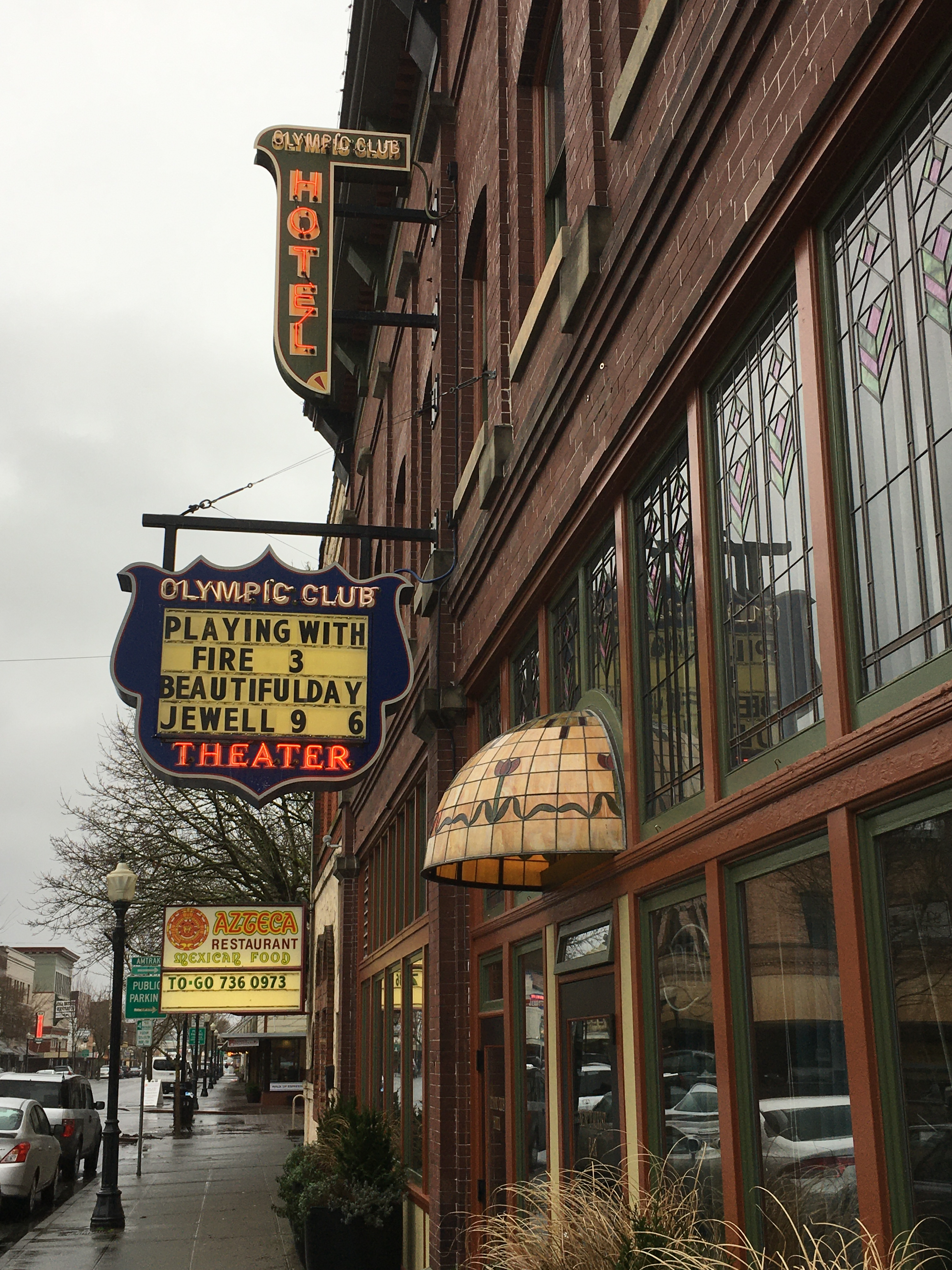
- Main entrance, Olympic Club Hotel, 2020
- Interactive map of the Olympic Club Hotel area
- Former names: Hotel Crawford, Oxford Hotel

General information
- Status: Open
- Type: Hotel
- Location: 114 North Tower Avenue, Centralia
- Coordinates: 46°43′00″N 122°57′14″W
- Construction started: 1913
- Completed: 1913
- Renovated: 2002
- Renovation cost: $2 million approx.
- Owner: McMenamins

Height
- Height: 2 stories
- Roof: Flat

Technical details
- Floor count: 2
- Floor area: 5,000 square feet (460 m^{2})
- Lifts/elevators: 0

Website
- McMenamins Olympic Club

The Olympic Club Hotel, also known as McMenamins Olympic Club Hotel and Theater, is a historic hotel owned by McMenamins Pubs & Breweries in Centralia, Washington, United States. The hotel is adjacent to the Olympic Club and situated in the Centralia Downtown Historic District, both listed on the National Register of Historic Places (NRHP). The hotel was not listed on the 1980 NRHP registry of the Olympic Club as it was, at the time, a separate building and business entity.

The hotel was constructed in 1913 and originally known as the Hotel Crawford. The moniker was changed the following year to the Oxford Hotel, a business name that survived into the 2000s. The establishment has contained a tavern known as the New Tourist Bar since its beginnings.

The Oxford may have been used partially as a brothel during its early years and Prohibition era. The capture of the "Gentleman Bandit", Roy Gardner, took place at the hotel in 1921. The hotel is also theorized to contain a bootlegger tunnel under its basement. A potential barrel storage area from the days of Prohibition was discovered under the club in 2001 but no tunnel has yet been found.

The building was considered vacant by the early 1970s but was purchased, along with the Olympic Club, by the McMenamin brothers in 1996. The hotel building, renamed as the Olympic Club Hotel, was restored beginning in mid-2002 and reopened, including the historic bar, later that same year. A Tiffany glass dome, used as an awning over the main entrance was installed in 2003.

The hotel features 27 rooms, many named after prominent people from Centralia or notable historic figures who lodged at the site. Former employees are also honored with named rooms. Lodgings are bereft of modern amenities, including in-room bathrooms. The single-screen theater, built in 2002 and not original to the hotel, features armchair and couch seating. The interior design style is similar to that of the club and hotel. Patrons can be served food and drinks during film showings.

The connected venues were combined to form McMenamins Olympic Club and McMenamins Olympic Club Hotel and Theater.

== History ==
The Olympic Club Hotel, adjacent to the Olympic Club, was built by a local lumberman in 1913. The hotel was a separate business from the club and originally known as the Hotel Crawford; it was renamed in 1914 as the Oxford Hotel as homage to a saloon of a similar name that once existed at the site. The Oxford moniker remained into the 2000s. The hotel's location was specifically chosen due to numerous travelers coming into the city at nearby Centralia Union Depot. The establishment contained a saloon known as the New Tourist Bar and also contained a pool hall. A brothel may have been operated out of the hotel by the wife of an early owner, with ladies accompanying as many as half of the rooms.

The historic club and shuttered hotel, which had been vacant since the early 1970s, were purchased by the McMenamins brothers for $300,000, acquiring the combined properties from the Vogel family estate in 1996. The sale forced the closure of an existing tavern business, known as the El 7 de Copas, that was located on the bottom floor of the hotel. Investments and funding to the historic club and hotel provided by the city of Centralia was due in part to an overall downtown improvements project, specifically the recent completion of the city's historic train station. With plans to use the club as a microbrewery, the brothers reopened the Olympic Club after renovations were complete in January 1997.

Early plans during the McMenamin's purchase included the construction of a movie theater and wading pool at the Oxford Hotel. The idea was temporarily suspended in 1998 as the company was focused on expansion efforts in California and Oregon. The hotel remodel, which included the Oxford to be used as a bed and breakfast establishment, began in June 2002 while reincorporating the original plans for a movie theater; a renovation of the New Tourist Bar was also part of the effort. The hotel and theater were reopened on October 31, 2002, and a three-day dedication celebration was held.

The entirety of the connected venues, including the bar, hotel, and dining areas were combined under the McMenamins Olympic Club name though each establishment continues under separate titles, such as the Olympic Club Pub, the Olympic Club Hotel and Theater, and its bar, the New Tourist Bar.

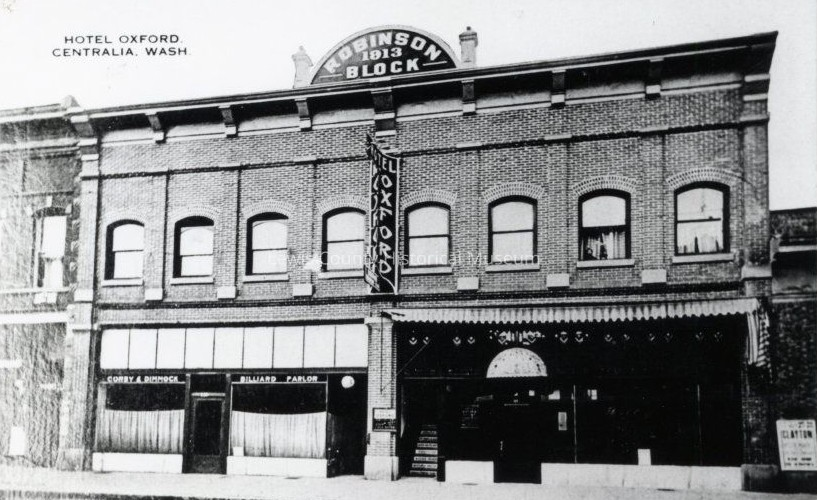
Oxford Hotel, 1913

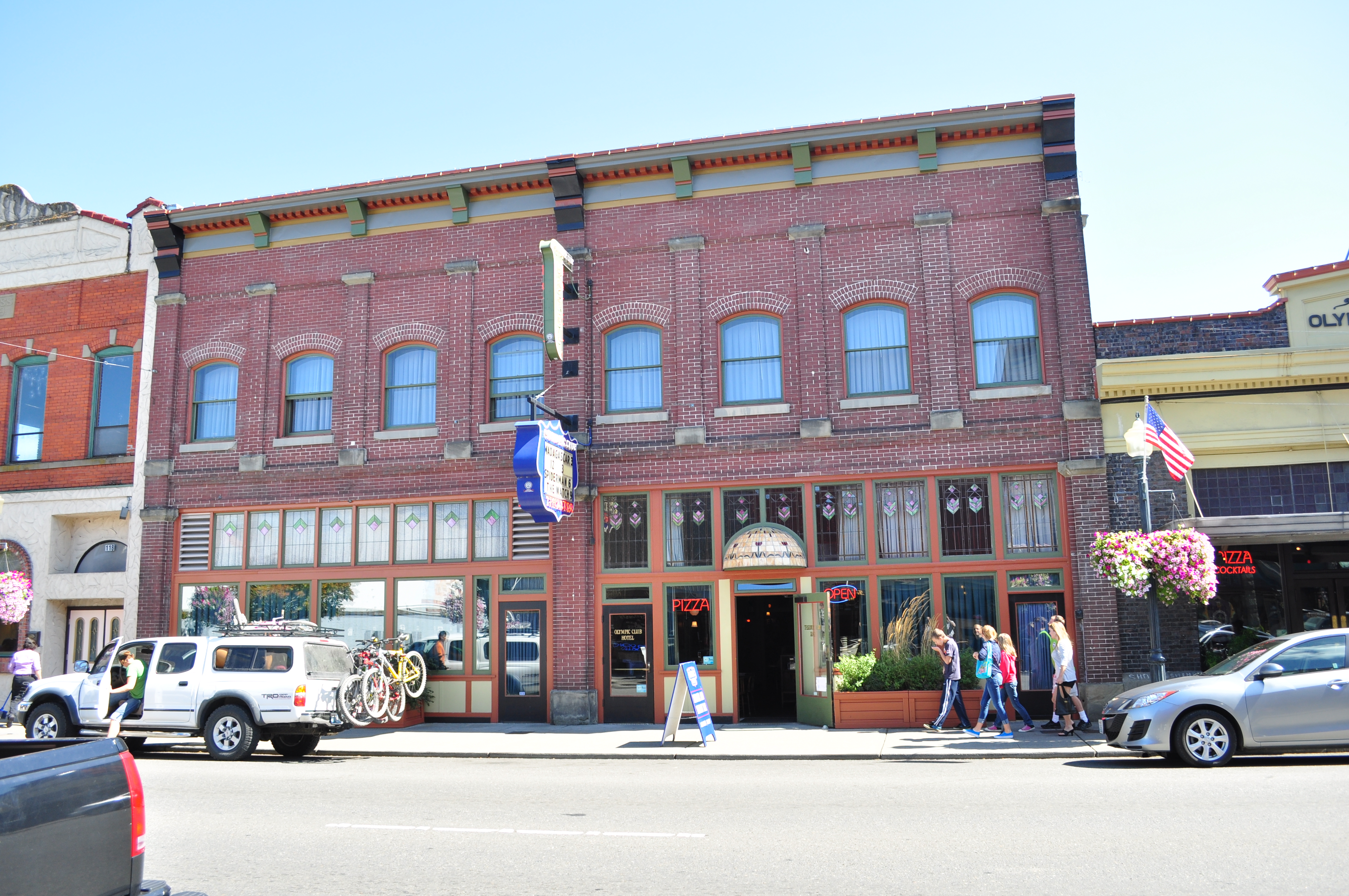
Olympic Club Hotel, 2012

=== Ownership ===
The hotel was a separate entity since its beginnings and an early owner was a Mrs. Mary Phillips, who sold the establishment in 1930 to the Melvin family out of Havre, Montana. By the 1950s, the hotel was under ownership of Raymond L. Metz, who sold the business to Mabel Erickson in 1956. Ownership changed hands several times in the 1960s, with the hotel's operations sold to a Mrs. Tommy Massey by owner Doris Thompson. Marie Bethke took over in 1963 who transferred ownership to the Vogel brothers in 1965.

=== Capture of Roy Gardner ===
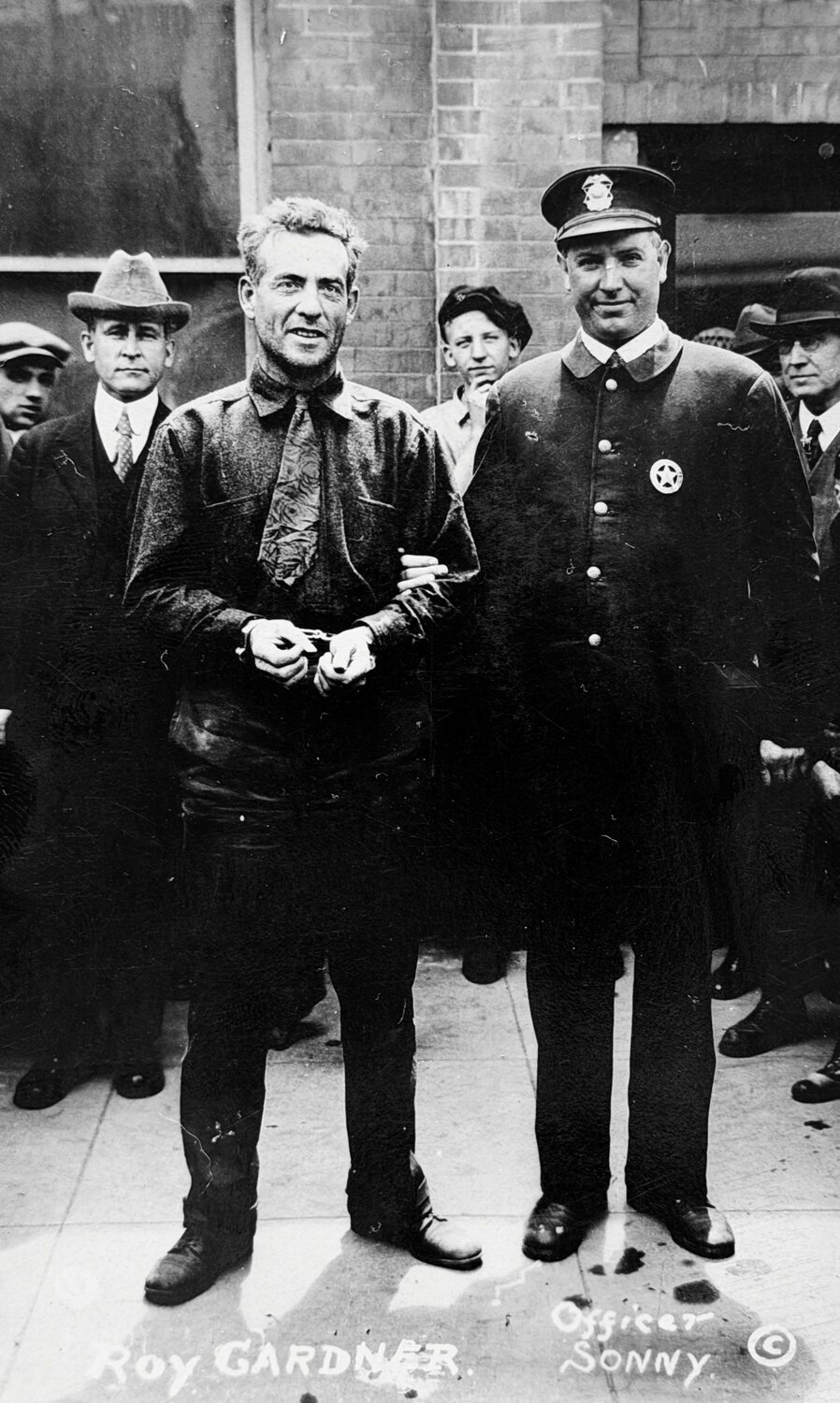
Roy Gardner and Louis Sonney after capture, June 16, 1921

Notorious train robber Roy Gardner, known as the "Gentleman Bandit", was re-captured at the then-Oxford Hotel on June 16, 1921, after escaping federal custody at McNeil Island Corrections Center. Gardner was checked in under the name "A.J. Wright" and his head and face were covered in bandages as a means to go undetected. (Note: Gardner's cover story for his bandages was that his face was injured during a blow torch accident that occurred in Tacoma.) Upon entering the Olympic Club for breakfast, owner Jack Sciutto jokingly referred to the bandaged man as "Roy Gardner". A chambermaid voiced her suspicions to a proprietor of the hotel, Gertrude Howell, who reported her concerns to the local police. (Note: Reports mention that Gertrude Howell's suspicions were further raised by noticing part of an uncovered eyebrow on Gardner's face after he informed her that all his facial hair was lost in the accident.)

After a brief investigation by the officers, his cover story was found to be false. Police officer Louis Sonney trailed "Wright" for a time as the fugitive leisured about the city. Assured in his suspicion, Sonney approached the bandaged man, instructing him to remove his wrappings. Despite a beard and unkempt appearance, he was immediately noticed as the wanted man though Gardner temporarily denied being so. (Note: The arresting police officer, Louis Sonney, almost let Gardner go. He believed the masked man, who threatened a lawsuit for false arrest, to be so earnest in his injuries and denials even when no wounds could be found.) He was arrested without physical altercation. (Note: Immediate reports on Gardner's arrest vary in certain aspects, including those responsible for reporting suspicions, the spelling of policeman Sonney's last name, and the timeframe when Gardner fully admitted his real identity. See sources listed in the section for the discrepancies.) Officer Sonney toured on the vaudeville circuit, recounting the tale of Gardner's capture. He eventually became a movie producer, including a film of the event that included Gardner starring as himself. Sonney partnered with his son, Dan Sonney, in the 1930s to create "seedy" B-movies.

== Geography ==
The Olympic Club Hotel is located in Centralia, Washington and within the Centralia Downtown Historic District, an NRHP-listed district. The saloon's acreage on its NRHP form was stamped as "not verified" but the club and hotel are estimated to each have a footprint of approximately 5,000 feet (1,524.0 m). The club and hotel are adjacent to one another on Tower Avenue.

== Architecture and features ==
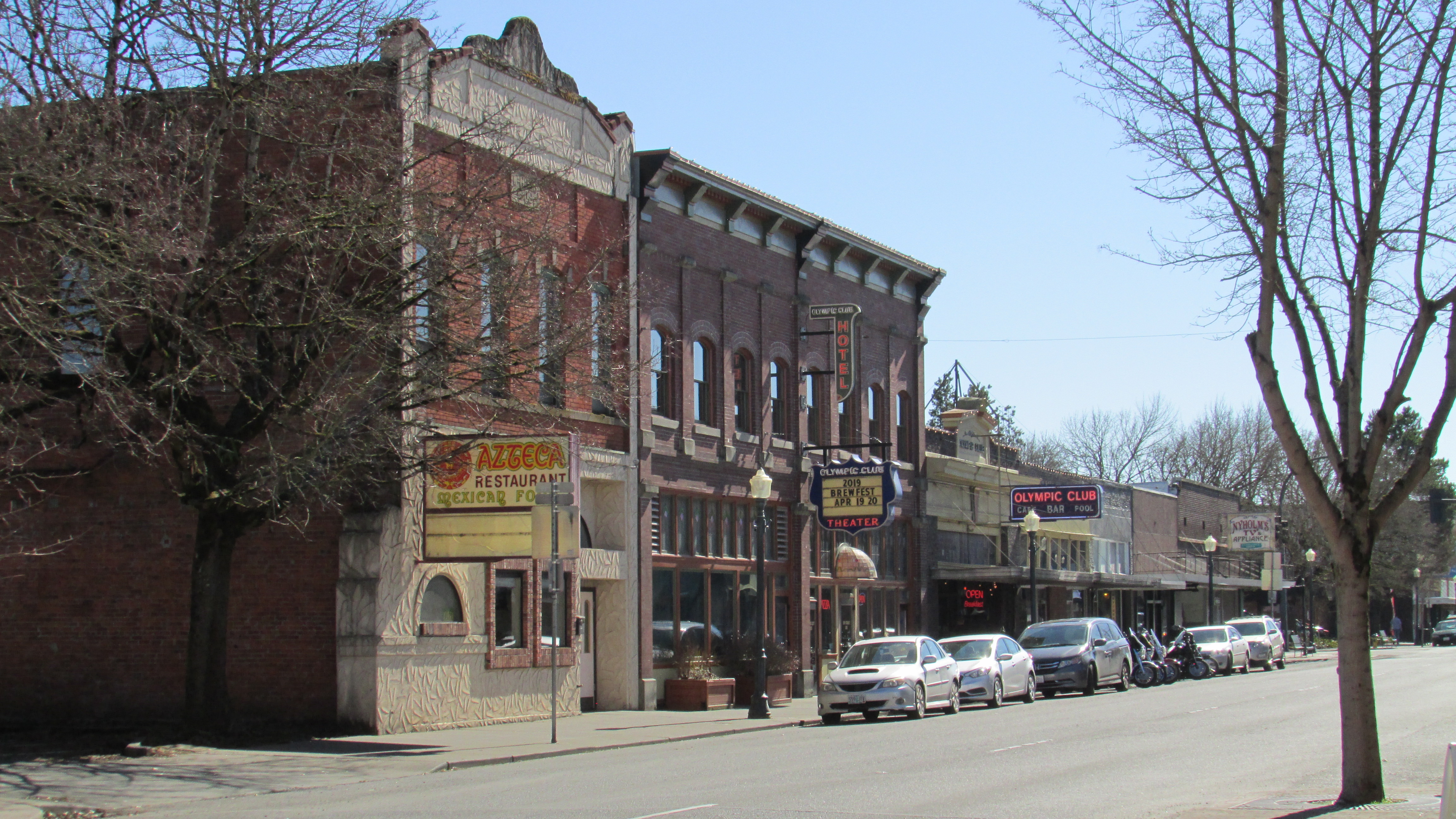
Olympic Club and Hotel, Centralia Downtown Historic District, 2019

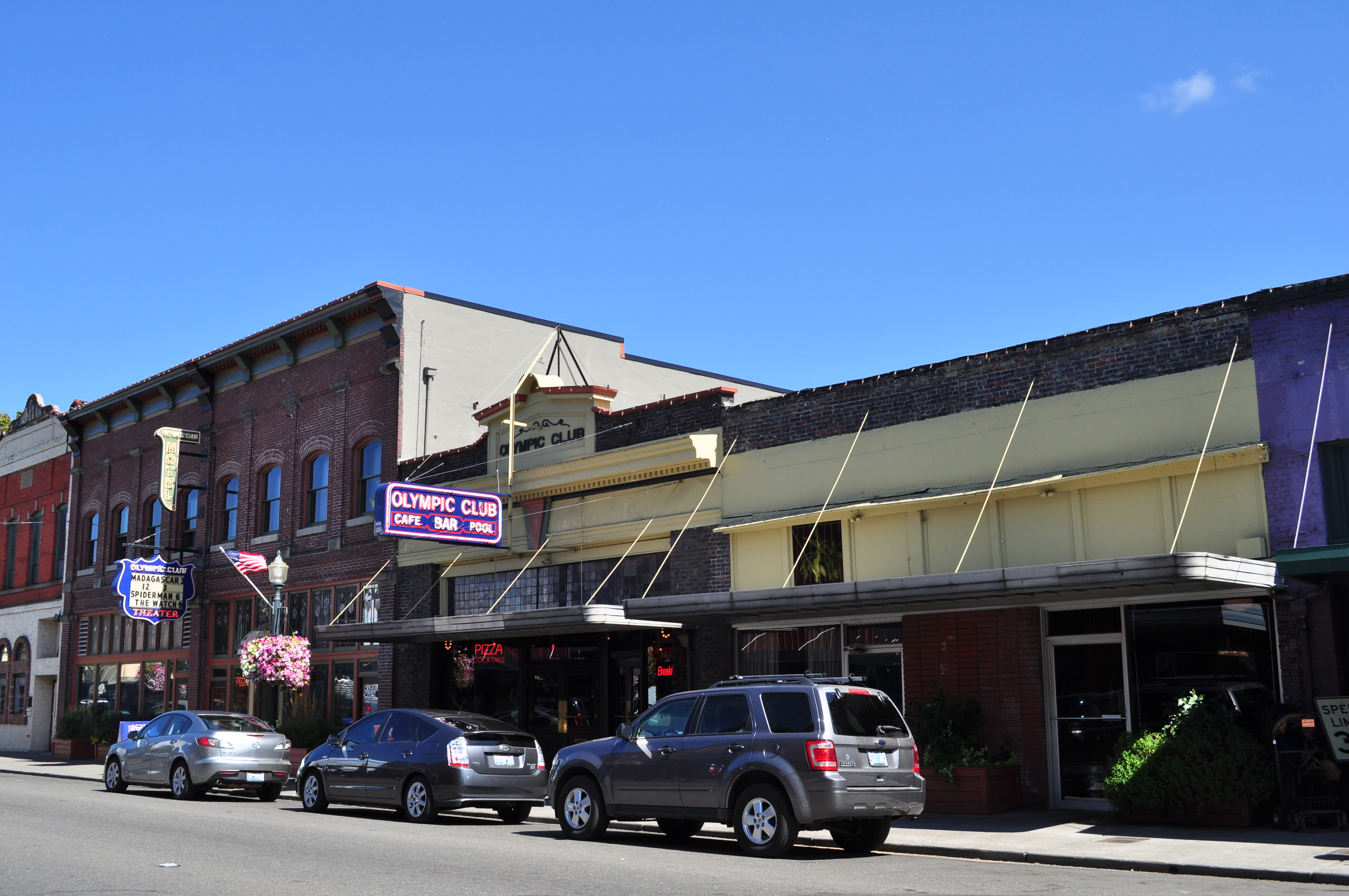
Olympic Club Hotel, 2012

=== Olympic Club Hotel ===
The combined club and hotel establishment accommodates two bars and a restaurant within the pool hall setting that contains original, vintage decor. The lodging portion of the hotel building is located above the New Tourist Bar and dining area. The original 16-stool mahogany bar built between 1913 and 1916 was renamed to its original moniker, the New Tourist Bar, after the McMenamin remodel. The space is decorated with six original Tiffany stained glass lamps hanging from a tin ceiling and is host to two antique cash registers.

The hotel contains 27 "European-style" rooms that lack modern amenities such as telephones or televisions. Rooms are described as being small to medium in size and the overall style of the hotel as "railroad-hotel". Apartments feature a sink but lack ensuite bathrooms. Private but shared bathrooms are located in the hallway. Hotel guests must leave the building to access the Olympic Club from the outside. Hotel rooms are accessed by stairs; no elevator exists on the property. By 2003, a Tiffany-styled glass dome was noted to be located over the main entrance.

High-ceilings dominate the second floor and the hallways are covered in various memorabilia, such as a displayed search warrant for alcohol in 1929 during Prohibition. Photos of loggers and miners, as a connection to the site's past, are hung on walls throughout the club and hotel space. As a reminder to the hotel's brothel history, a painting of a nude woman is placed in the main hallway of the second floor. A signed copy of Roy Gardner's book, Hellcatraz, the Rock of Despair, is on display at the hotel.

Each room is named after historic visitors, prominent Centralians, or prior employees of great contribution. A room is named after an employee of Al Capone and another for George Washington, Centralia's founder. Art Vogel, a prior owner, has a room in which a sign above the headboard mentions the phrase, "Be careful what you do, son", a common bit of advice from Art. Rooms are named for people recognized for their involvement in the capture of Roy Gardner, such as Gertrude Howell and Louis Sonney. Employee or owner named spaces include that of Lucien Christen who was a long-serving card dealer at the Olympic Club in the mid-20th century, Ione Sellards, a cook in the 1960s who was the first female employee of the club, (Note: Sellards employment at the club was considered such a "rare sight" that passersby would peer into the club for a look.) and a room for first club owner, Jack Sciutto. Prominent men who are honored include 1920s city mayor George Barner who shut down the club in 1923 due to bootlegging accusations (Note: Mayor George Barner, a bank manager as well, has been reported to be at least aware of the club's illegal alcohol activity and may have only revoked the Olympic Club's business license under pressure from local temperance groups and religious leaders.) and Philadelphia millionaire, Charlemagne Tower, namesake of the city's downtown thoroughfare, Tower Avenue. (Note: Charlemagne Tower never lived in Centralia but helped build a Northern Pacific Railroad line in the community and owned approximately 40,000 acres (16,000 ha) of coal and timber lands in the surrounding area.) Centralia lawyer, Elmer Smith, noted for his role in defending IWW members involved in the Centralia Tragedy is also included. Smith and "Wobblies" (Note: "Wobbly" or "Wobblies" are non-pejorative nicknames for members of the Industrial Workers of the World (IWW). The origin of the moniker remains uncertain.) met at the Olympic Club in the 1920s to strategize on furthering an IWW free speech movement.

The basement is suspected to have been used for bootlegging and may contain tunnels leading to the nearby historic Centralia Union Depot. The tunnel is also reported to lead to a house across from the club and may have once contained a dead body, discovered when a new platform was installed at the train station. Located in the basement is a pickle barrel that features a false bottom that hides a trap door to conceal a space used during Prohibition to hide alcohol. During a downtown improvement effort known as the "Centralia Streetscape Project", a "void", approximately 12 feet (3.7 m) wide and up to 40 feet (12.2 m) long, was discovered under a sidewalk outside the main entrance of the Olympic Club in July 2001. Containing a set of wooden rails, the subterranean room was theorized to be a storage area where barrels could be rolled down into the space. (Note: A 1996 Secret Service inspection of the downtown district during a visit to Centralia by President Bill Clinton further increased rumors that a bootlegger tunnel existed or was discovered. At the time of the Olympic Club Hotel and Theater reopening in 2002, no evidence had been found of the illicit underground passage.)

An ivory button located in a mirrored booth in the club, and still noted to exist in the 2000s, was used to activate an alarm bell. The button is theorized to also have been used to summon "ladies of the moment" from the brothel located in the hotel.

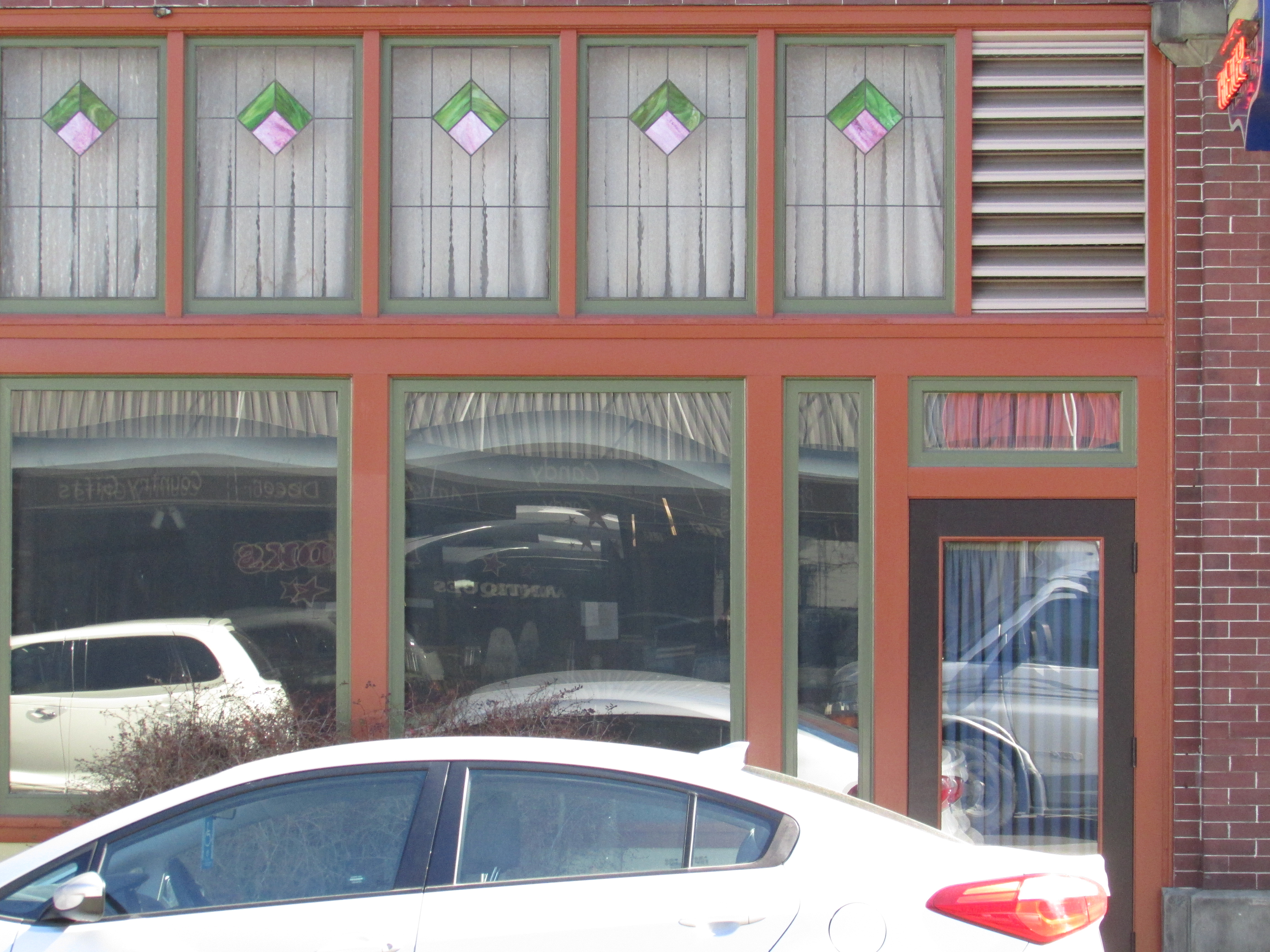
Exterior details, 2019

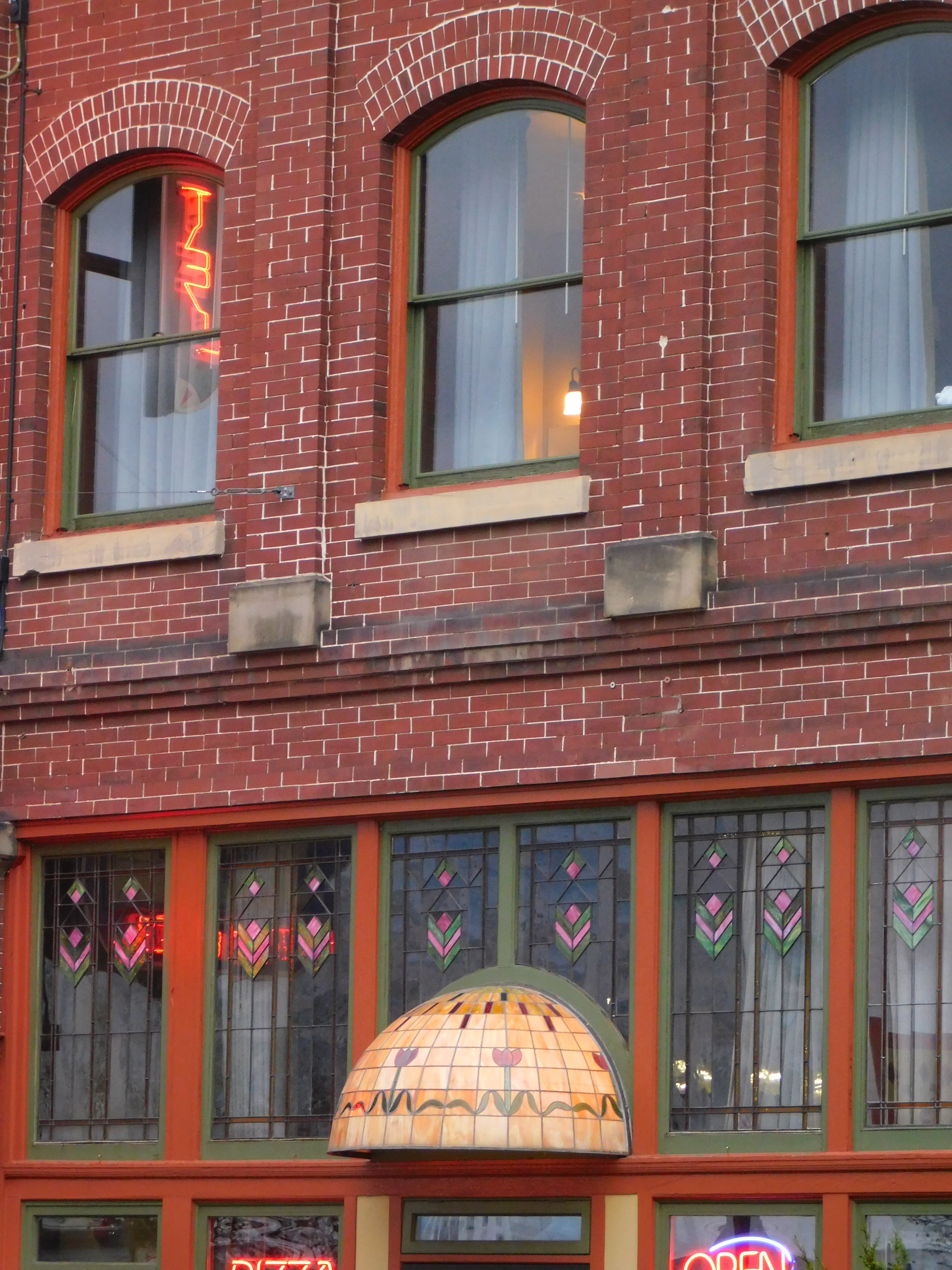
Façade details, 2025

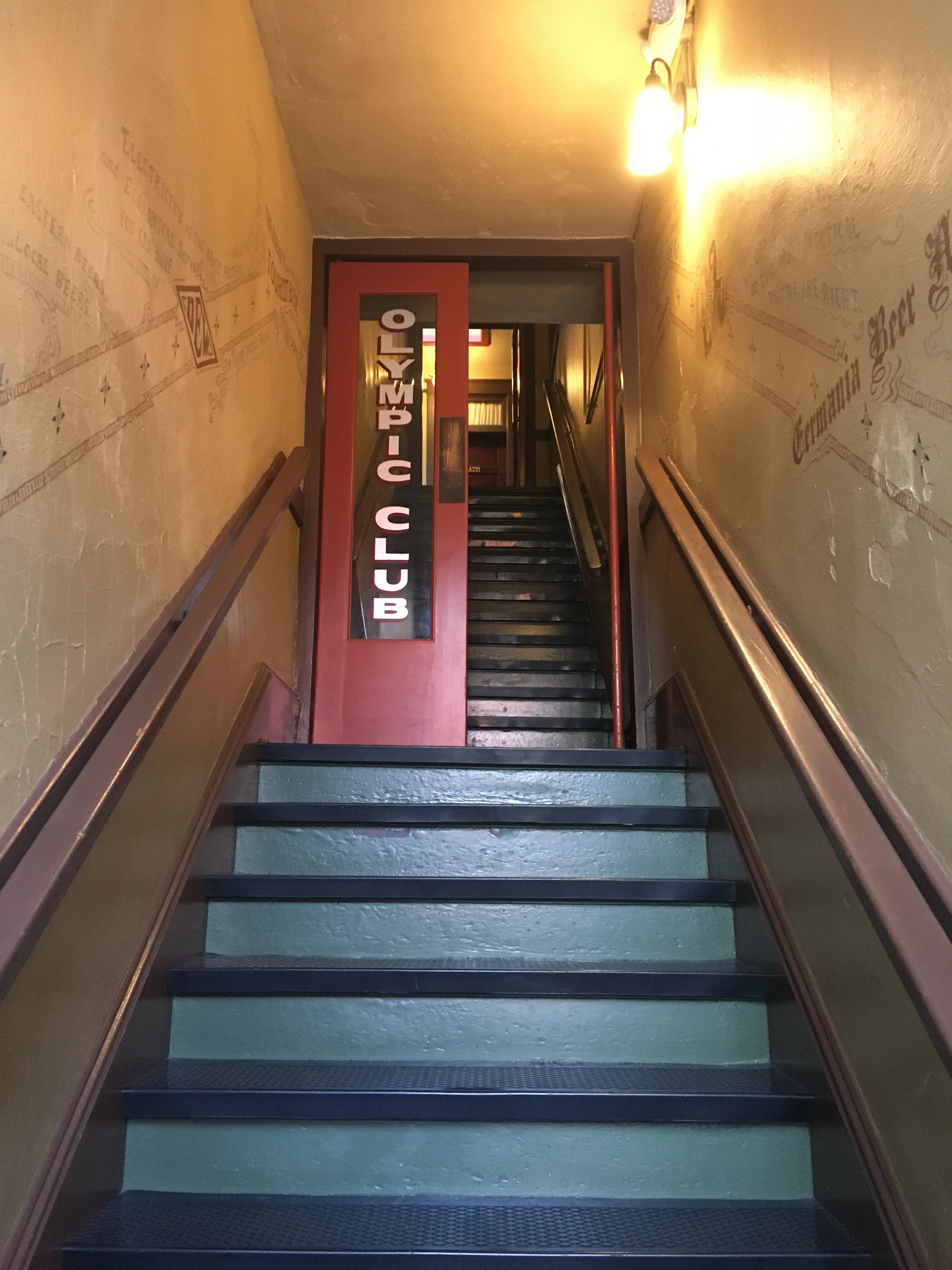
Stairs to hotel, 2020

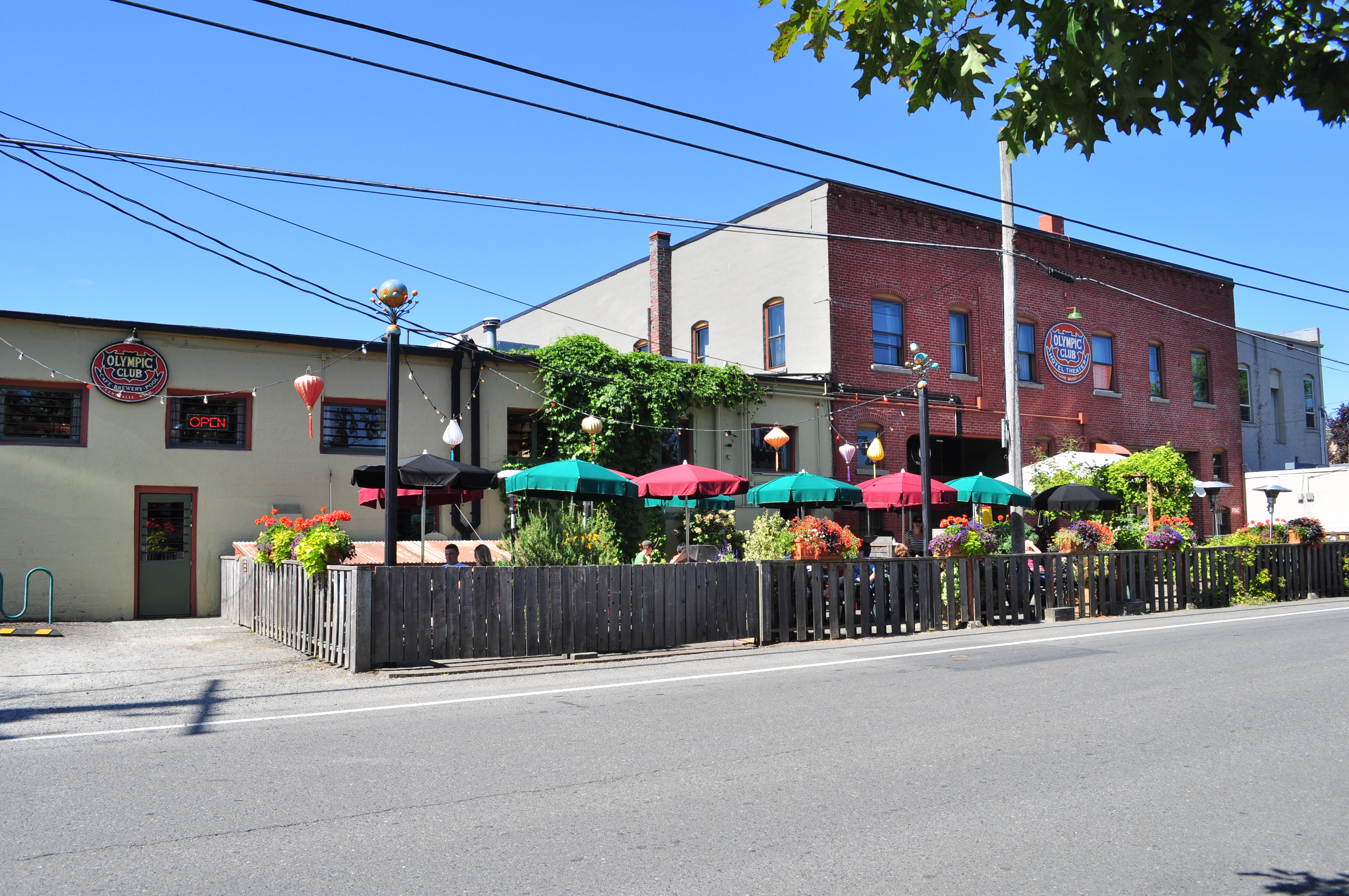
Olympic Club and Hotel, rear, 2012

=== Olympic Club Theater ===
Olympic Club Theater
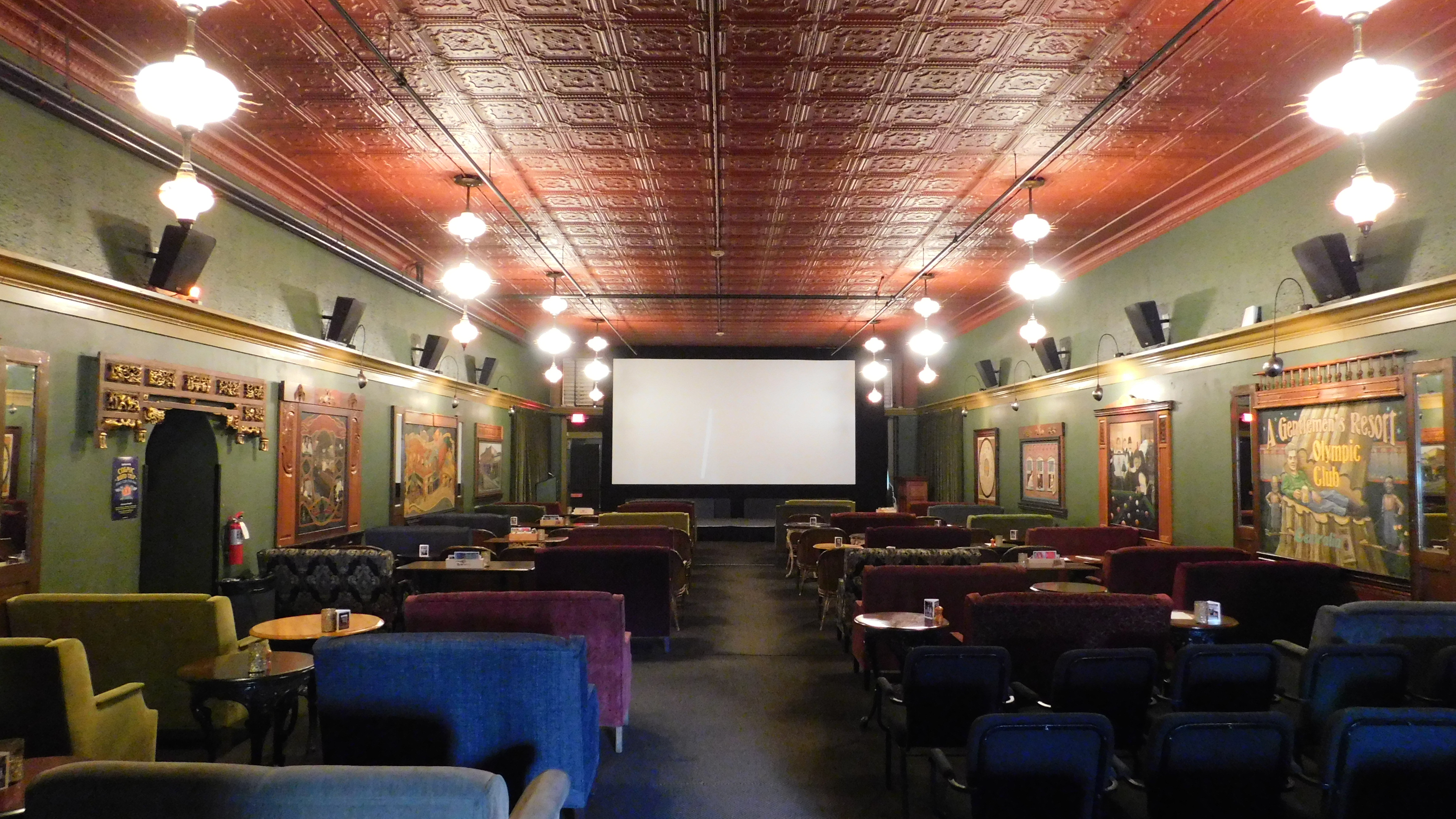
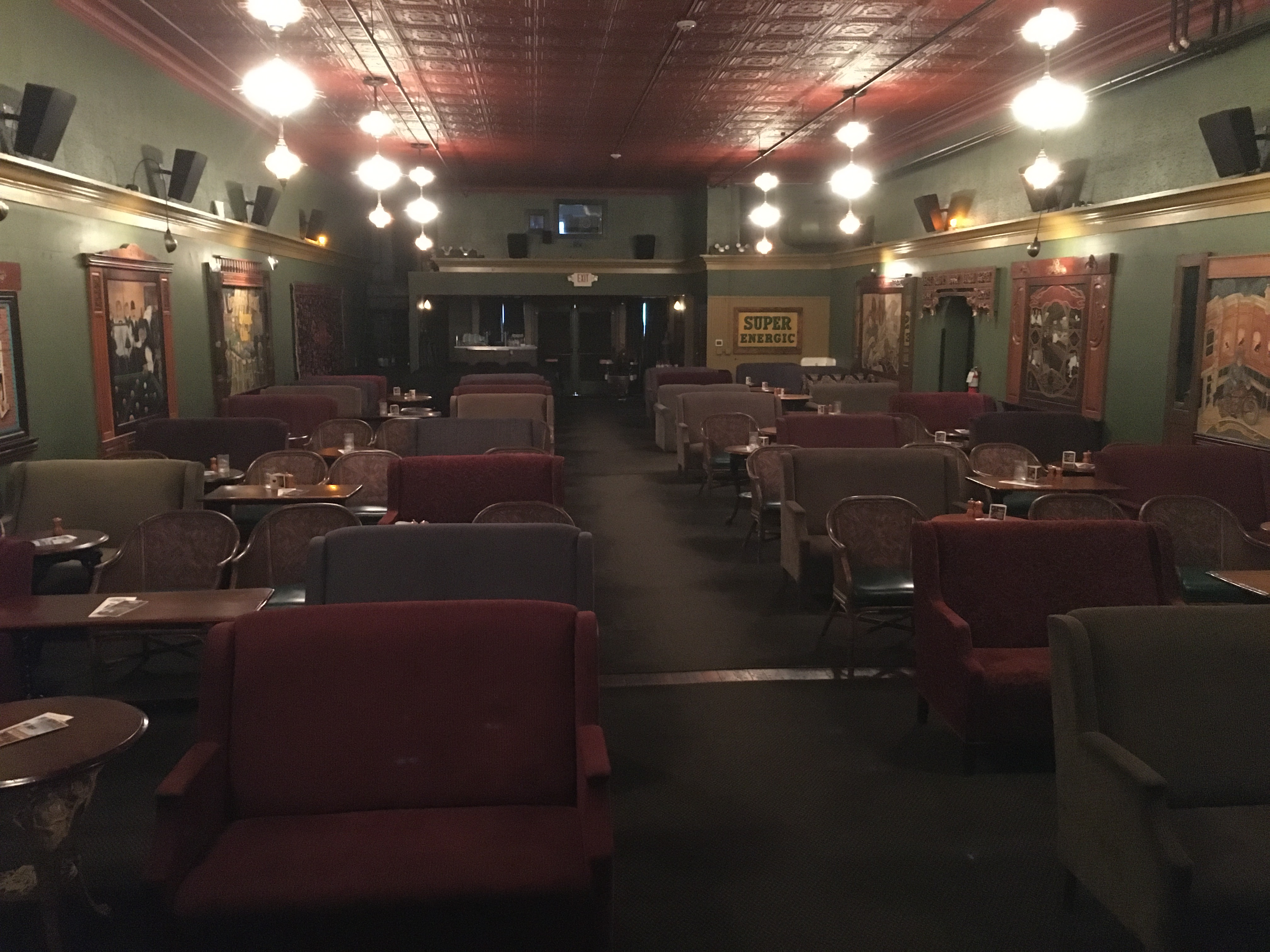
- Theater screen, 2026 Theater seating, 2020
- Interactive map of Olympic Club Theater
- Location: Inside the Olympic Club Hotel
- Owner: McMenamins
- Seating type: Couches, armchairs
- Capacity: 200
- Type: Movie theater
- Screen: 1

Construction
- Built: 2002
- Opened: 2002

Website
- McMenamins Olympic Club Theater

The Olympic Club Theater is a brewpub movie house. The space was originally built in the 1920s and was the location of a men's clothing store and later as a barbershop; the room was later converted into a billiards hall and card room. The conversion into a movie theater began in 2002 featuring a 18 ft × 9 ft (5.5 m × 2.7 m) "pull-down" screen. The theater, with an approximate occupancy of 200, (Note: The occupancy for the Olympic Club Theater has varied widely in reporting, from as low as 100 to as high as 300 people. Most sources mention 200. See sources, post-1996, throughout the article for the discrepancies.) became the first operational movie house in the city since the closure of the city's downtown Fox Theatre in the late 1990s. Movie tickets at the October 2002 opening were listed at $3. Due to the history of the theater's site once being a place of "wild behavior", the first movies shown, Austin Powers in Goldmember and Monty Python and the Holy Grail, were chosen for their "eccentricity".

The room is decorated with a tin ceiling, velvet couches, and various forms of art including photos of notorious guests. Eight framed murals are located in the space, including Lady Luck Unhitches the Side-Car. The side car in the painting is displayed in the Olympic Club billiard room. Lighting includes onion dome, glass globes over metal sunray fixtures. Portraits are painted on visible pipes in the theater. Two barber chairs and a sink, remaining from the days when the space was used as a barbershop, were preserved and displayed after the 2002 opening.

Food and drink service is provided during screenings and patrons can watch films while seated in sofas or armchairs.

The film premiere of the Yard Birds franchise documentary, Skinny and Fatty: The Story of Yard Birds, was held at the McMenamins Olympic Club Hotel and Theater in July 2009.

=== Renovations and restorations ===
In March 1916, the Oxford Hotel's bar room was planned to be converted into an office and grill room. The project was completed the following month.

The Oxford Hotel renovation began in 2002 and the building remodeled into a "European-style bed and breakfast". Shared bathrooms were moved to be centrally located and the overall project adhered to the original design of the structure.

The combined restoration of both the club and hotel in the late 1990s and early 2000s was originally estimated to cost $2 million, equivalent to $4,105,665 in 2025, and was considered the first major renovation of either site since 1913.

=== Extinct features ===
A Western Union telegraph office opened at the Oxford Hotel in 1917.

== Tourism and entertainment ==
By the reopening of the Olympic Club Hotel in 2002, the hotel held 27 rooms and rates were listed between $40 and $65. The charges usually included breakfast and covered the cost for a ticket to the Olympic Club Theater. The hotel and restaurant offered a dinner and room bundle for a time, known as the "Roy Gardner Great Train Escape" package.

== Significance ==
The Olympic Club was added to the National Register of Historic Places (NRHP) and the Washington State Heritage Register on March 10, 1980. The Oxford Hotel was not added to the Olympic Club registries as it was a separate building and entity at the time.

As part of a larger revitalization project in Centralia's historic downtown district, the Olympic Club Hotel and Theater was joined with the city and the Centralia Union Depot in receiving an award in 2003 for "Outstanding Special Achievement" by the Washington State Historic Preservation Office.
