= Olympic Club (Centralia, Washington) =

National Register of Historic Places bar and restaurant in Centralia, Washington

- U.S. National Register of Historic Places
- Washington State Heritage Register
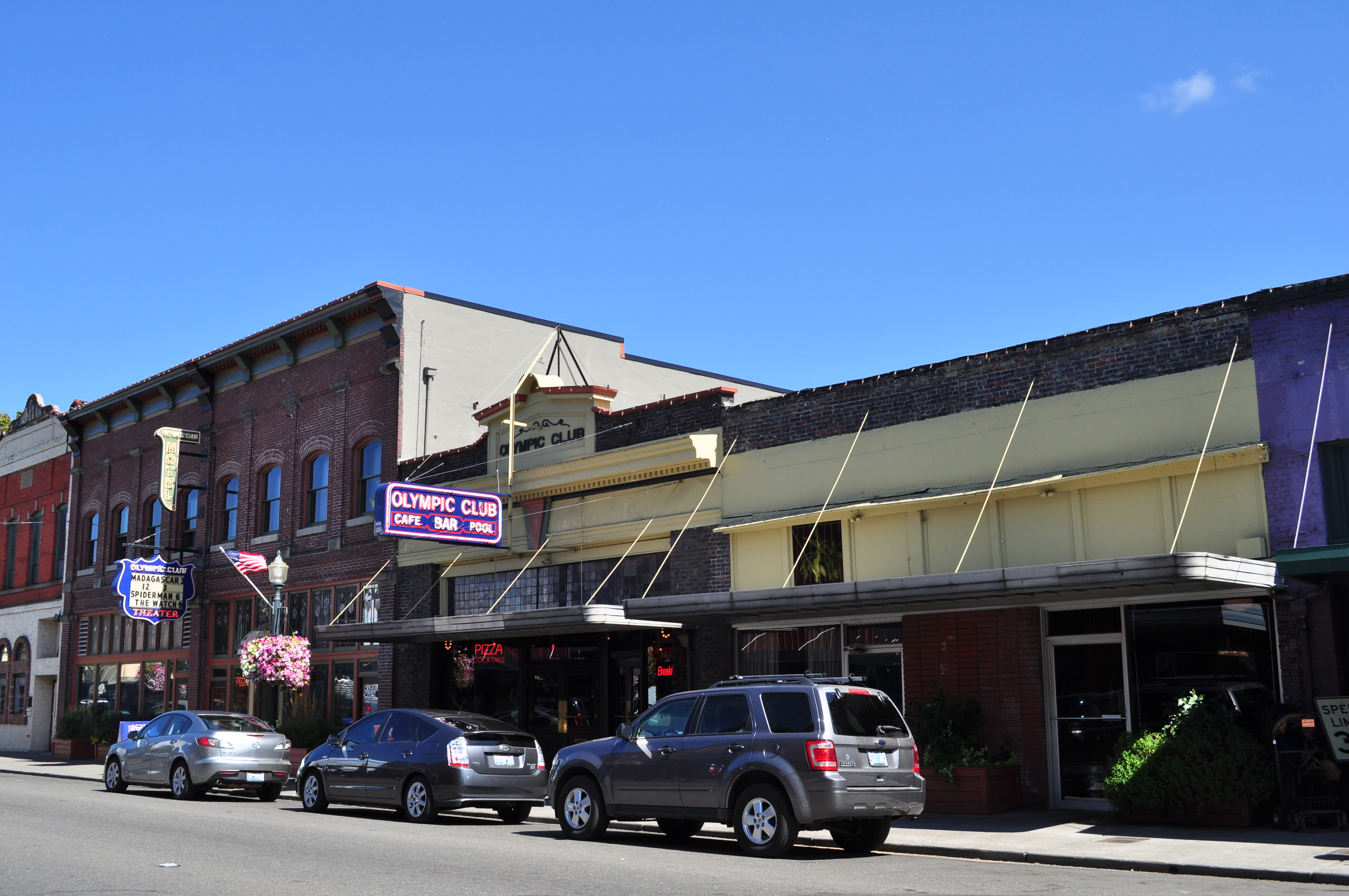
- Olympic Club and Hotel, 2012

- Location within Washington (state)
- Location: 112 North Tower Street, Centralia, Washington
- Coordinates: 46°43′00″N 122°57′14″W
- Built: 1908
- Architectural style: Art Nouveau (interior)
- Restored: 1913, 1996
- Restored by: McMenamins, (1996)
- Website: McMenamins Olympic Club
- NRHP reference No.: 80004006

Significant dates
- Added to NRHP: March 10, 1980
- Designated WSHR: March 10, 1980

The Olympic Club, also known as the Olympic Club Saloon and in the 21st century as McMenamins Olympic Club, is a historic bar and restaurant owned by McMenamins Pubs & Breweries in Centralia, Washington, United States. The club was listed on the National Register of Historic Places (NRHP) in 1980 and is situated in the Centralia Downtown Historic District, also listed on the NRHP.

The Olympic Club was constructed and opened in 1908. The club was rebuilt in 1913 after a fire and was remodeled with features that remain in the present-day. The Art Nouveau-style interior contains a billiard room and areas for a bar and restaurant. Original features, such as artwork and Tiffany glass light fixtures, decorate the space.

The club was a local gathering spot, especially for miners and loggers, since its opening and was known for illicit activities, including gambling and potentially prostitution from the adjacent Oxford Hotel. During Prohibition, the club continued to sell alcohol. Despite some raids and brawls, the men only saloon was considered a gentlemen's club and had a good relationship with the Centralia police department.

In 1996, the club and Oxford Hotel were purchased by the McMenamins brothers. The club was restored and reopened in January 1997. The connected venues were combined to form McMenamins Olympic Club and McMenamins Olympic Club Hotel and Theater.

== History ==
Prior to the Olympic Club's construction, a saloon, possibly known as the Olympic Saloon or Olympic Club, was built on the site as early as 1891.

The historically-designated Olympic Club was constructed in 1908 (Note: While a majority of reporting on the Olympic Club agree that the establishment was built in 1908, other sources vary on the construction date, mentioning either 1907, 1912, or 1913 as alternatives. See sources throughout the article for the discrepancies.) on Tower Avenue in what was known as the Patton and Lake Building. The establishment began after a fire destroyed parts of the building. By 1910, the avenue through the city's downtown district included approximately 35 bar establishments. The club was severely damaged in a fire in 1913 but was rebuilt and remodeled, the interior restyled under Art Nouveau design.

The club became popular for card games (Note: High value poker games, illegal under state laws of the time, were recorded as regularly being played into the 1970s.) and to a variety of patrons, including local loggers and miners. By the 1920s, the Olympic Club was known for "brawling outlaws" but yet remained as a "gentleman's club" and was often on good terms with the Centralia police department. By the 1930s, diners crowded the club's restaurant, often "three deep" at the counter, as the club became known for "good and plentiful" fare.

The site was known for "sumptuous" design and function, with alcohol served in Belgian cut glass. The business survived the Prohibition era and gambling bans of the early 20th century, and for a period, the establishment banned women from the grounds. By the 1970s, owners welcomed ladies to the club but mentioned that the establishment lost "a bit of its old-time atmosphere" when women visited the establishment. A "Ladies patronage not solicited" sign remained affixed above the main entrance by 1980. An evocation of the past, the sign's edict had long been unenforced.

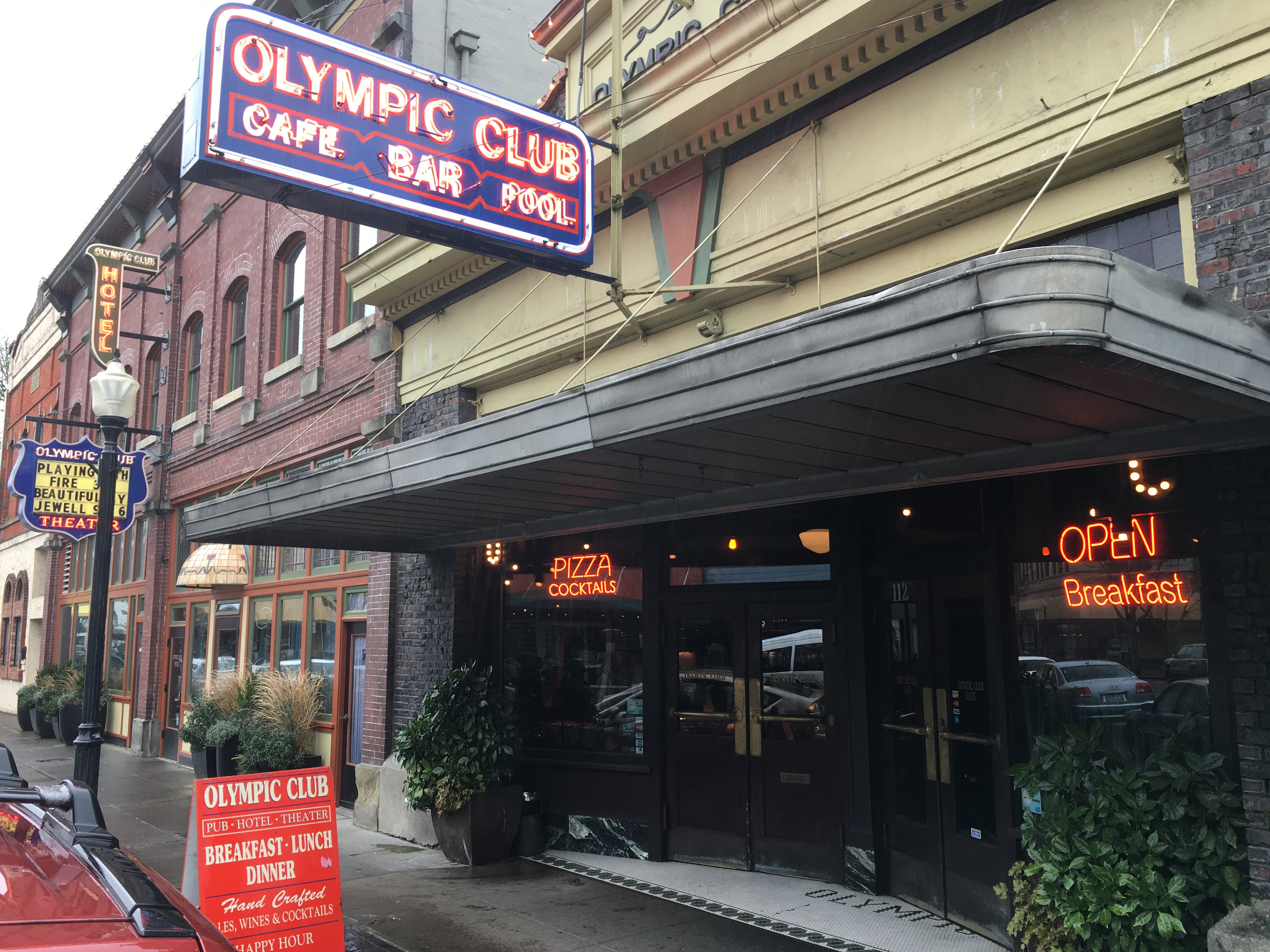
Main entrance, Olympic Club, 2020

The historic club and the adjacent but shuttered Oxford Hotel, which had been vacant since the early 1970s, were purchased by the McMenamins brothers for $300,000, acquiring the combined properties from the Vogel family estate in 1996. Investments and funding to the historic club and hotel provided by the city of Centralia was due in part to an overall downtown improvements project, specifically the recent completion of the city's historic train station. With plans to use the club as a microbrewery, the brothers reopened the Olympic Club after renovations were complete in January 1997; McMenamins was added to the Olympic Club moniker to reflect the new ownership.

A centennial celebration of the Olympic Club was held in October 2003.

The entirety of the connected venues, including the bar, hotel, and dining areas were combined under the McMenamins Olympic Club name though each establishment continues under separate titles, such as the Olympic Club Pub, the Olympic Club Hotel and Theater, and it's bar, the New Tourist Bar.

=== Ownership ===
Ownership of the club and saloon began under Canadian business owner, Jack Sciutto, who partnered with Ernest Rector in 1911. The business team dissolved and site ownership and operations began under a decades-long, unbroken tenure of the Art Vogel family. After Art's death, ownership transferred to his sons, Charles and Paul. Paul died in 1994 and the club and hotel were placed for sale under the Vogel family estate. At the time of the McMenamin's purchase during the week of September 29, 1996, the hotel had an assessed value of $100,000; the club was noted to be worth less than $71,000.

=== Notable events and incidents ===
Using a sledgehammer, the club's safe was cracked open by yeggmen in October 1914, absconding with $600, equivalent to $19,286 in 2025. A safe at the club was cracked in 1969; the stolen money was reported as a "small amount".

== Geography ==
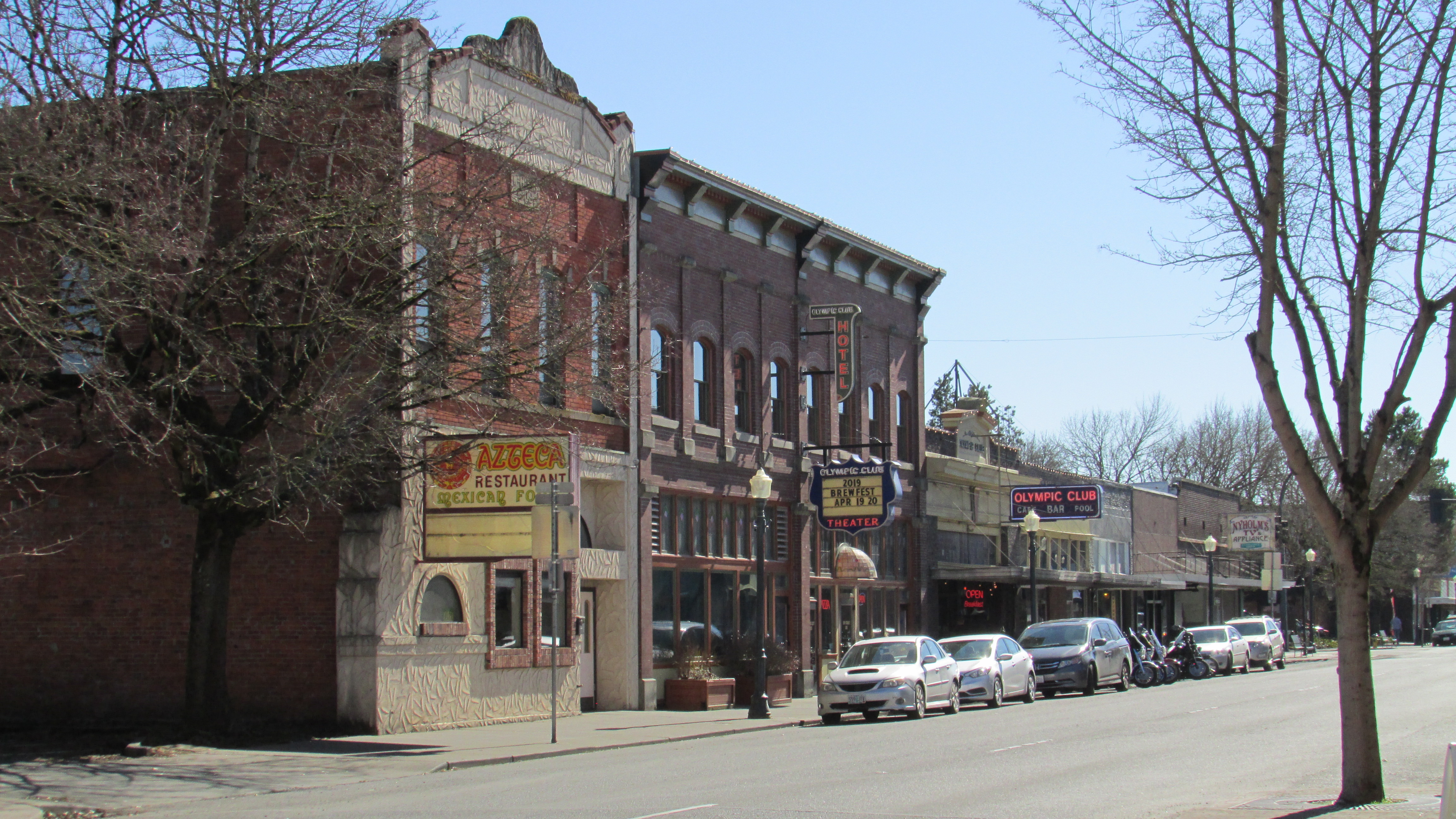
Olympic Club and Hotel, Centralia Downtown Historic District, 2019

The Olympic Club is located in Centralia, Washington and within the Centralia Downtown Historic District, an NRHP-listed district. The saloon's acreage on the NRHP form is stamped as "not verified" but the club and hotel are estimated to each have a footprint of approximately 5,000 feet (1,524.0 m). The club and hotel are adjacent to one another on Tower Avenue.

== Architecture and features ==
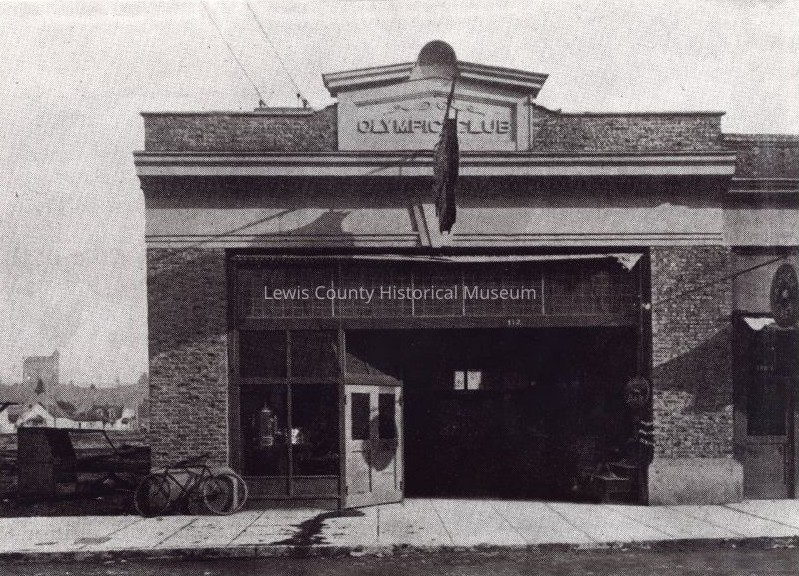
Olympic Club, exterior, 1910

Unless otherwise noted, details on the Olympic Club are provided based on the 1980 National Register of Historic Places (NRHP) nomination form and may not reflect updates or changes to the building or site in the interim.

The one-story structure is approximately 30 ft × 90 ft (9.1 m × 27.4 m) in dimension. An interior room at the back of the building expands the footprint into an "L" shape. At the time of the historic designation, the Olympic Club was noted to be "virtually unchanged for the last 66 years".

=== Exterior ===
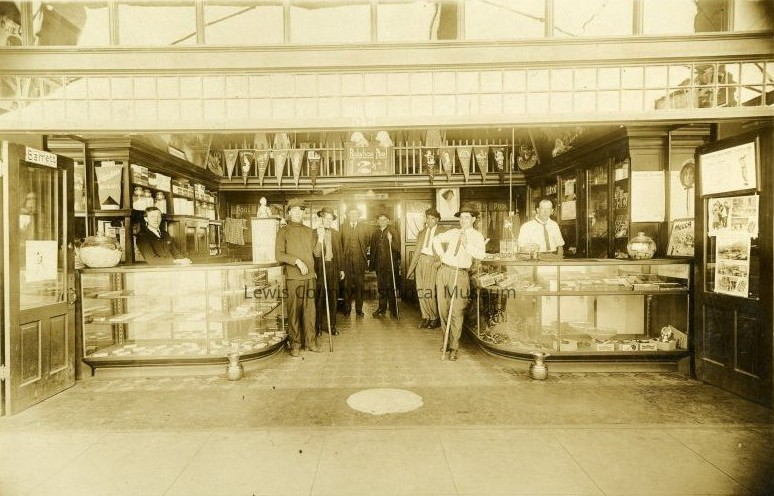
Open air bar, 1913

The exterior façade is sheathed in a dark colored clinker brick supported over cement quoins. A 128-window fenestration (Note: The NRHP nomination form lists the measurements of the individual glass panes as 4 high by 32 long. Although it could be assumed the dimensions are meant to be inches, it remains unclear per the document and lack of other supporting sources.) spans above the entirety of the front of the building. Above the transom feature is an entablature that contains "s"-shaped moldings and a dentil cornice. At the top of the structure is a brick parapet which includes a stucco pediment that features the inscription, "OLYMPIC CLUB". Scrollwork and a fan-shaped ornament, done in relief, decorate the front exterior wall.

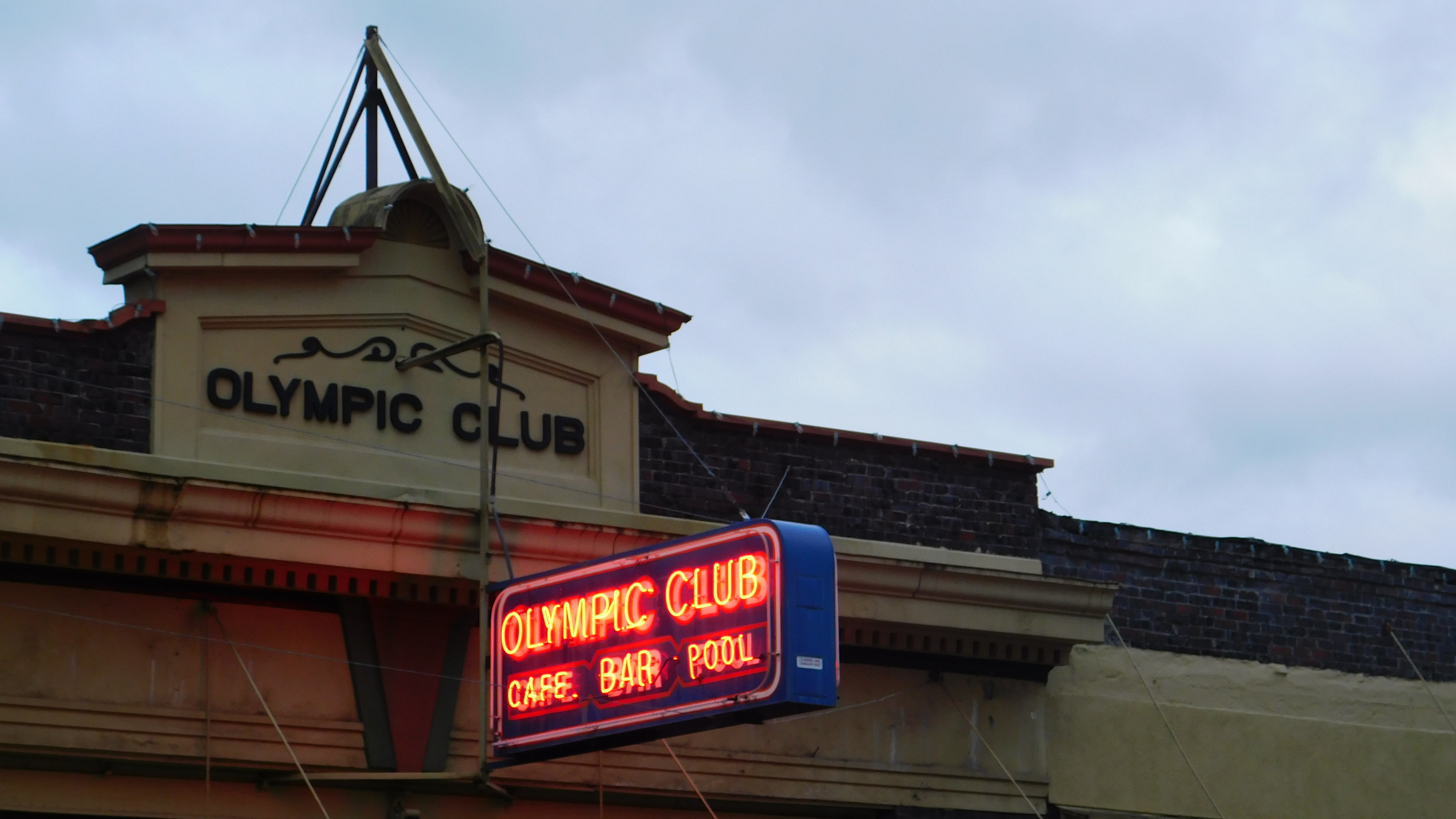
Signage and pediment, 2025

A metal marquee is situated over the recessed front entrance. Above hangs a neon sign for the club that protrudes at a right angle from the building. At the time of the NRHP nomination, the sign advertised the site as, "Olympic Club, Coffee, Cards, Pool".

=== Interior ===
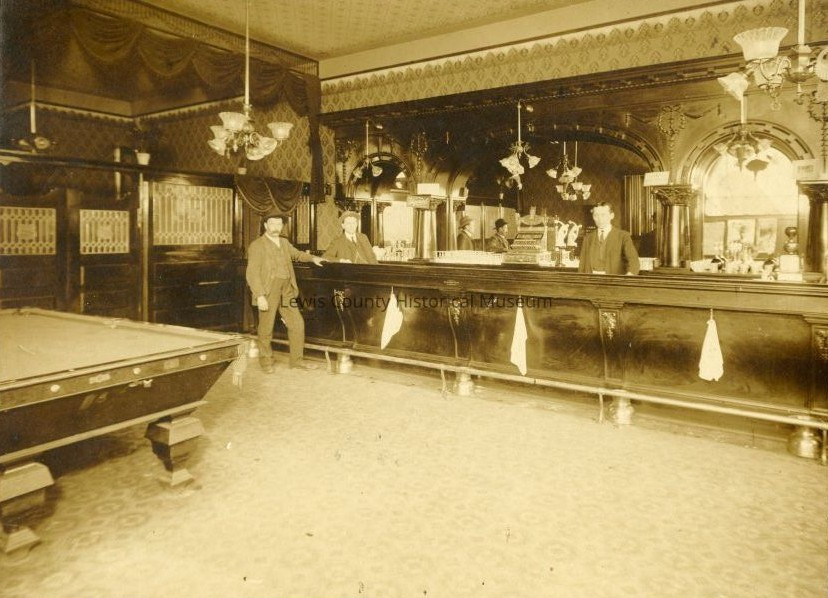
Bar and billiards room, ca. 1908

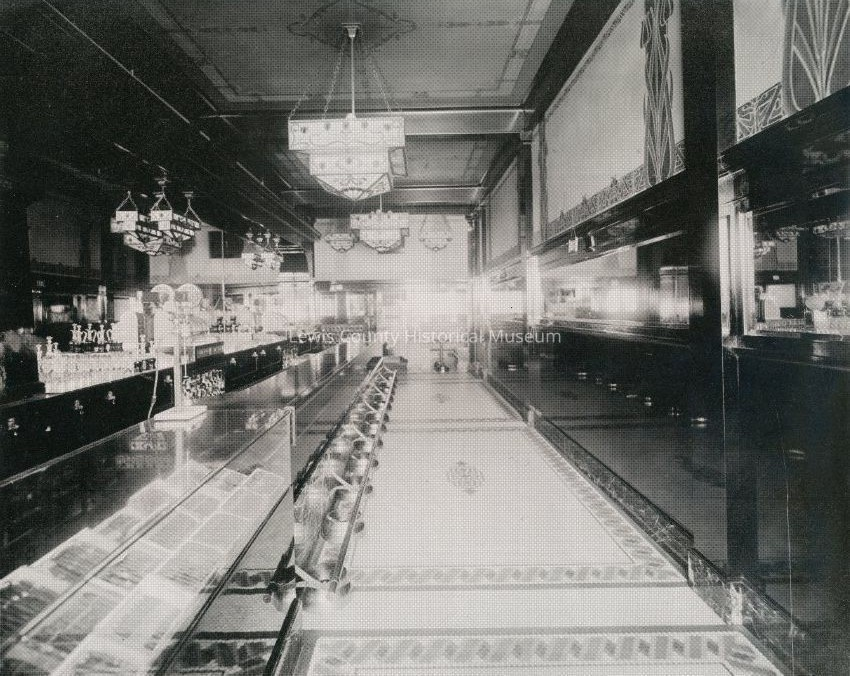
Interior, restaurant area, early 20th century

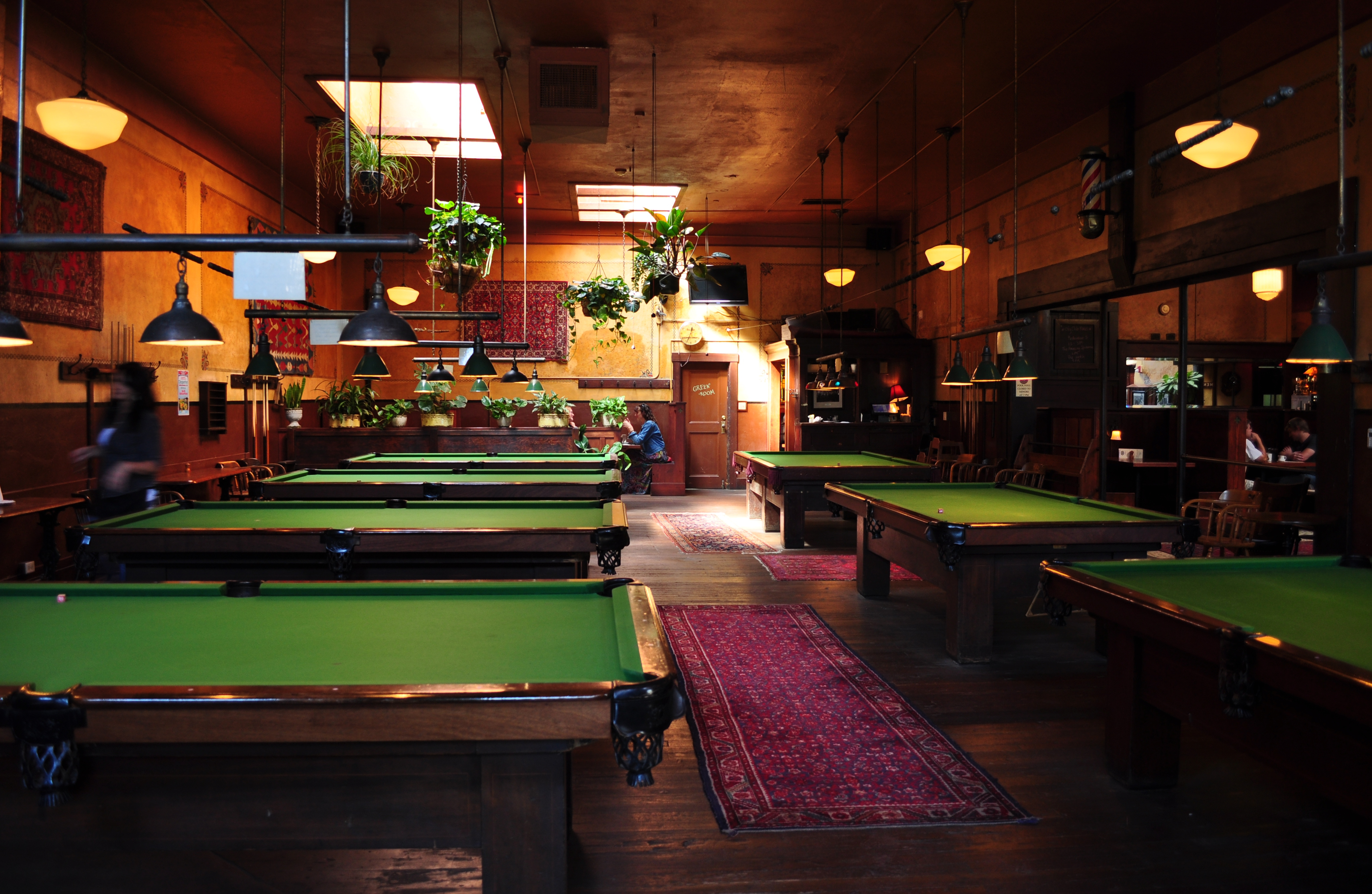
Billiards room, 2012

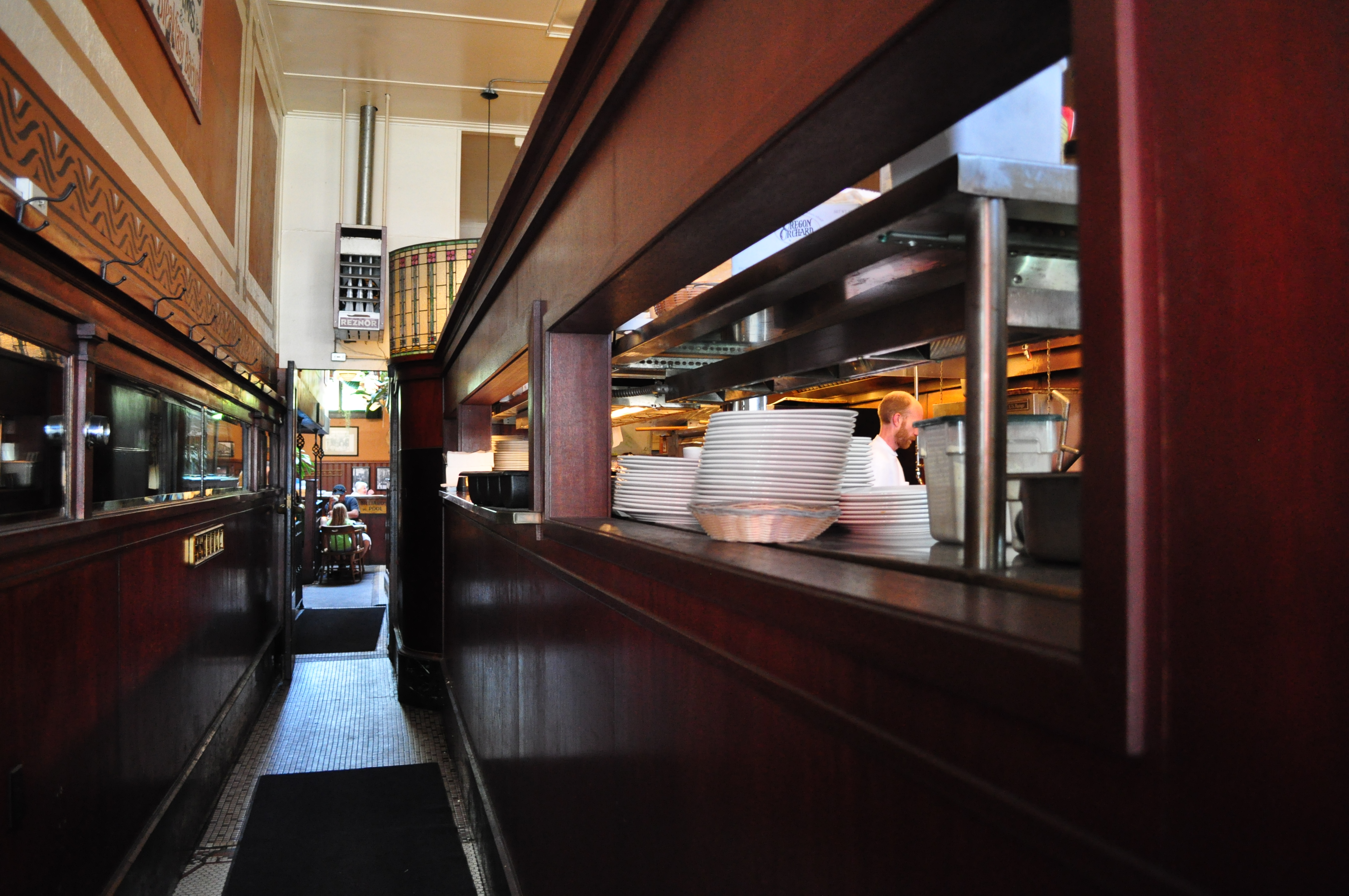
Hallway to dining area, bypassing bar, 2012

The main entrance of the club, which contains mahogany doors with brass kick plates, pull bars, and trim, allows guests to enter the bar to the left or the restaurant area to the right. A patterned, hexagonal tile floor extends from the sidewalk through the bar space to a card room; tiles at the entrance spell out, "Olympic".

The wood bar, shipped around Cape Horn in 1908, is trimmed in ebony and features curved glass. The bar space was upgraded in 1913 to include Art Nouveau details. Appointments included beveled, lead glass windows, mahogany molding, trim, and wainscotting, and parquet tile flooring. Three 8 ft × 12 ft (2.4 m × 3.7 m) French glass mirrors were added, framed within the cherry veneer back wall of the bar; chandeliers were also installed. Stained glass, marquetry, and murals painted in oil were additional touches undertaken during the efforts. An overall theme based on tulips decorated the interior, including light fixtures, stencil designs placed on the plaster walls, and a motif in two sections of the ceiling. Booths in the space included Tiffany glass panels for privacy. A large cigar stand was noted to still remain next to the bar in the 1970s.

The card room is located at the rear of the space. A similar tulip-and-Art Nouveau design, as part of the 1913 renovation, decorates the room. Linoleum tile once covered the floor but was at some point replaced with small, square ceramic tile. A wood-burning, 7 foot (2.1 m)-tall potbellied stove manufactured in 1914 and a barber chair occupied the card room by the 1980 nomination.

A "cavernous" billiards room is separated from the card room by a low railing. Stencils, following the tulip motif, decorated the walls of the pool hall. The restaurant features beveled mirrors and a continuation of mahogany millwork, including wainscotting.

The Olympic Club and the Olympic Club Hotel accommodates two bars and a restaurant within the pool hall setting that contains original, vintage decor. The mixed use dining and pool hall area contains the club's original Brunswick pool tables, restored during the 2002 remodel. The site also hosts a private "Green Room", an outdoor patio, and a brewery.

The women's restroom was noted to still be outfitted with crystal chandeliers in 2003. A steampunk-design of plumbing fixtures was installed during the McMenamin's remodel in the late 1990s.

A mirrored booth sits near the bar area. The mirrors increased the sightlines to entrances of the establishment, and the club and its patrons would be alerted to any incoming federal agents during Prohibition. An ivory button, still noted to exist in the 2000s, was used to activate an alarm bell. The button is theorized to also have been used to summon "ladies of the moment" from the brothel located in the hotel.

=== Artwork ===
A mural depicting the events of Roy Gardner's 1921 capture is located in the Olympic Club. Newspaper copies of Gardner's exploits in Centralia, as well as personal quotes and mug shots of the bank robber, adorn the club walls. Photos of loggers and miners, as a connection to the site's past, are hung on walls throughout the club and hotel space.

=== Renovations and restorations ===
The McMenamin's remodel of the Olympic Club after the 1996 purchase cost approximately $200,000. An acoustic tile, dropped ceiling was removed and artists were hired to paint designs on the walls of the buildings. Original details that were hidden by prior remodeling efforts, such as floor tile, stenciled designs, and stained glass, were preserved. A new, exterior neon sign, mentioning the Olympic Club and the amenities of cafe, bar, and pool, was installed in November 1996. The efforts also included new plumbing, "extensive cleaning", and a balcony was added.

=== Extinct features ===
The saloon once had a canvas marquee and a different protruding sign, simply as "Olympic Club", above the 128-window transom. Both items were noted to be in existence by 1910. The club restaurant was originally located in the bar area; the spaces were swapped in 1913. The bar used to contain several booths but only one was noted to remain by 1980. A barber shop was located at the club for a time, possibly in use into the 1950s.

== Tourism and entertainment ==
The Olympic Club hosts musical acts as part of the McMenamin chain's "Great Northwest Music Tour," mostly consisting of local and independent bands.

== Significance ==
The Olympic Club was added to the National Register of Historic Places (NRHP) and the Washington State Heritage Register on March 10, 1980. The Oxford Hotel was not added to the Olympic Club registries as it was a separate building and entity at the time. Owner Paul Vogel, as well as Violet Sciutto Blue, daughter of the club's first owner, were interviewed for the national designation.

The NRHP noted during the nomination process the importance of the club's Art Nouveau style and historical connections to Centralia's downtown core. By 1980, the Olympic Club was still considered a "reference point and popular meeting place" in the city, continuing to vary in patronage that had historically cut across socio-economic classes.
