= Centralia Downtown Historic District =

Historic district in Washington, United States

- U.S. National Register of Historic Places
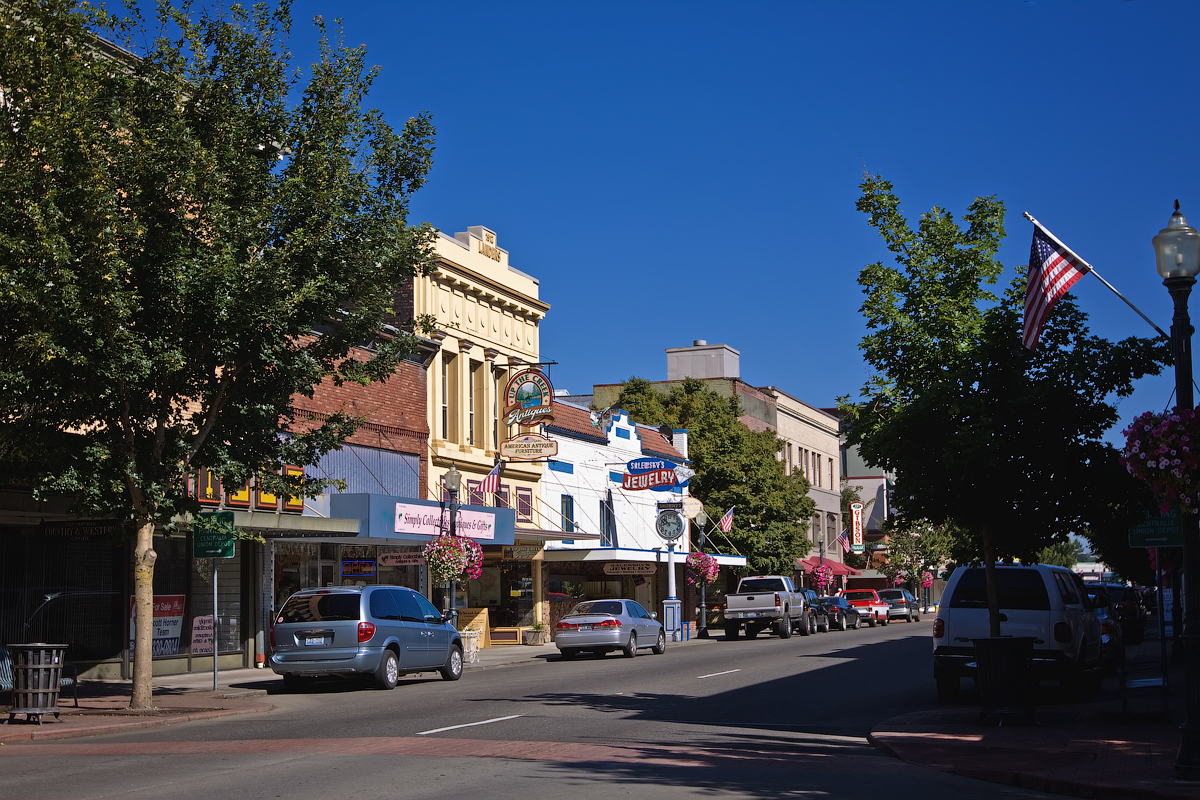
- Downtown in 2011

- Location within Washington (state) Location within the United States
- Location: Roughly bounded by Center St., Burlington Northern right-of-way, Walnut St., and Pearl St., Centralia, Washington
- Area: 25 acres (10 ha)
- Built: 1888
- Architect: Joseph Wohleb; Bebb and Gould
- Architectural style: Late 19th and Early 20th Century American Movements
- NRHP reference No.: 03000164
- Added to NRHP: August 18, 2003

The Centralia Downtown Historic District is a 25 acres (10 ha) historic district in Centralia, Washington, which was listed on the National Register of Historic Places in 2003. It's roughly bounded by Center St., Burlington Northern right-of-way, Walnut St., and Pearl St. It includes 59 contributing buildings, a contributing structure, and three contributing objects.

== History ==
=== 20th century ===
As part of a National Trust for Historic Preservation initiative, in 1985 the Centralia Downtown Historic District was one of five cities in Washington to undergo a revitalization effort to improve economic and historic facets of its downtown core. A partnership of private and public entities offered the city advice and planning, as well as loans well-below market rates to accomplish the restoration efforts. Centralia's downtown core had begun to show signs of being forgotten after the construction of Interstate 5 which bypassed the area. The efforts focused on the city's railroad history and the restoration of older buildings of historical note; ten murals were planned including the completion of a 20 ft × 40 ft (6.1 m × 12.2 m) painting featuring the Joseph Borst House.

=== 21st century ===
The downtown district underwent a renovation known as the Centralia Streetscape project that began in July 2001. Planned to be finished by November the same year, the efforts were not considered completed until January 2003. The project's purpose was to renovate the district to look similar to an early 1900s look and feel. Efforts to mimic the period included the installation of 50 vintage light poles, 40 cobblestone crosswalks, and 10 rosette markings at intersections. The early work was estimated to cost $3 million. Over forty trees and twenty benches were also added. Streets in the district were resurfaced and crumbling sidewalks were replaced. Façades were restored on historic buildings between 2001 and 2006 due in part to $250,000 in matching grants by the city.

The work was waylaid due to weather, difficulties with concrete and existing landscaping, and several unforeseen obstacles. Issues included the removal of old, collapsed storm drain pipes and hidden trolley tracks. A void was found under the sidewalk outside of the Olympic Club Saloon, suspected to be a hideaway during the Prohibition era.

The historic district is overseen by the Centralia Downtown Association which received an affiliate designation under the Main Street America program in 2025. The project recognized the ongoing business and volunteer efforts to maintain and restore the history of the downtown quarter.

== Significant contributing properties ==
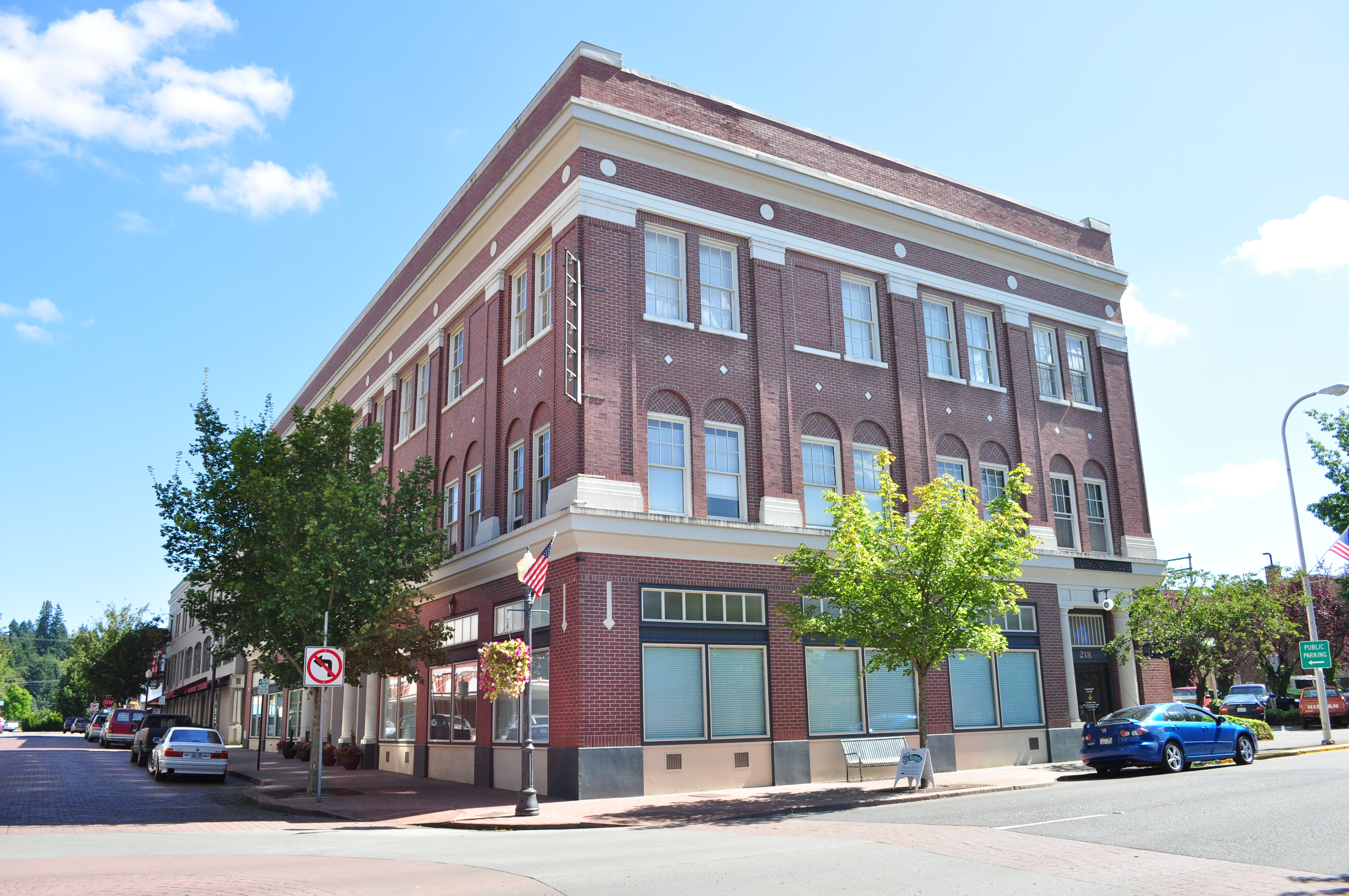
Masonic Building

Four sites in the district are listed separately on the National Register, the Centralia Union Depot, the federal Centralia Post Office, the McMenamins Olympic Club Saloon built in 1908, and The Sentinel, a sculpture dedicated to four legionnaires killed in Centralia's 1919 Armistice Day Riot.

=== Elks Building ===
The Elks Building, designed by Olympia-based architect, Joseph H. Wohleb, was constructed in 1920 as a permanent home to the city's Elks Lodge, which operated the facility until 1986. The building was sold and underwent remodeling that year to become the Centralia Square Antique Mall. As of 2026, the 28,000-square-foot (2,600 m^{2}) building is known as Centralia Square, or as the Centralia Square Grand Ballroom & Hotel after a renovation effort to restore the ballroom began in 2013.

=== Fox Theater ===
The Fox Theater was opened in 1930. The Art Deco venue held movie screenings and vaudeville performances during its run before facing decline. As of 2026, the theater has been undergoing renovation efforts.

=== Landers Building ===
The Landers Building, also known as the Lindberg Building, was constructed in 1912 during a period of economic and residential expansion of the city. Originally built for mixed commercial usage geared towards travelers on Tower Avenue, then the main thorofare through Centralia, it became home to a F.W. Woolworth store between 1913 and 1953, approximately. The building was remodeled in the 2000s after it was sold, the efforts receiving a "Pride of Centralia Award". Afterwards, the Landers Building began hosting an antique store.

=== Howell Hotel ===
The Howell Hotel was built in 1910, providing lodging to the city's visitors arriving by train and for timber and trade laborers in the area. The building originally hosted the ground-floor Moore Bros. Cafe and the commercial spaces were home to a variety of businesses over the years, including Bartels Men’s Wear, Calico Goose, and Harriet Goff’s Lingerie Shop. As of 2026, the hotel's bottom floor contains the business, The Shady Lady Boutique.

A prominent feature of the interior of the Howell Hotel is a curved, grand staircase that was installed approximately in 1955. The staircase was designed by Seattle-based architect, Paul Hayden Kirk. Located on the upper floors is The Shady Lady Bordello Museum, a collection dedicated to the history of Centralia's red light district and the women associated with the city's "hidden economy" during the early 20th century.

=== Other buildings ===
The district includes several buildings that were formerly home to fraternal organizations, such as the Masonic lodge building known as the Centralia Masonic Lodge which was constructed in 1923. The Aerie, known for its 2,800-square-foot (260 m^{2}) ballroom, was built in 1926 by the Centralia chapter of the Fraternal Order of Eagles.

== Public art ==
The Hub City Community Mural, located on the side of a building at 203 N Tower Avenue, was completed in 2025. The project began under the Centralia Downtown Association (CDA) and was created by muralist Matthew Anthony. The artwork was part of an effort to celebrate the city's sesquicentennial. Exactly 150 community members participated in adding to the mural; the age of the participants spanned from 18 months old to 86 years old. The watercolor-style artwork features a representative view of the downtown corridor and a wheel, centered in the frame and overlayed with the Hub City nickname. The CDA was awarded the 2026 Outstanding Special Project Award from the Washington State Main Street Program for the public artwork.

== Economy ==
Before the 2001 Centralia Streetscape project, businesses in the historic district had a 40% vacancy rate; by 2006, the level had dropped to "near zero".

A 2026 economic and fiscal study undertaken by the Port of Centralia reported that the downtown district was estimated to produce $155 million in direct economic "output" and almost an additional $70 million in connected financial activity.

== Recognition ==
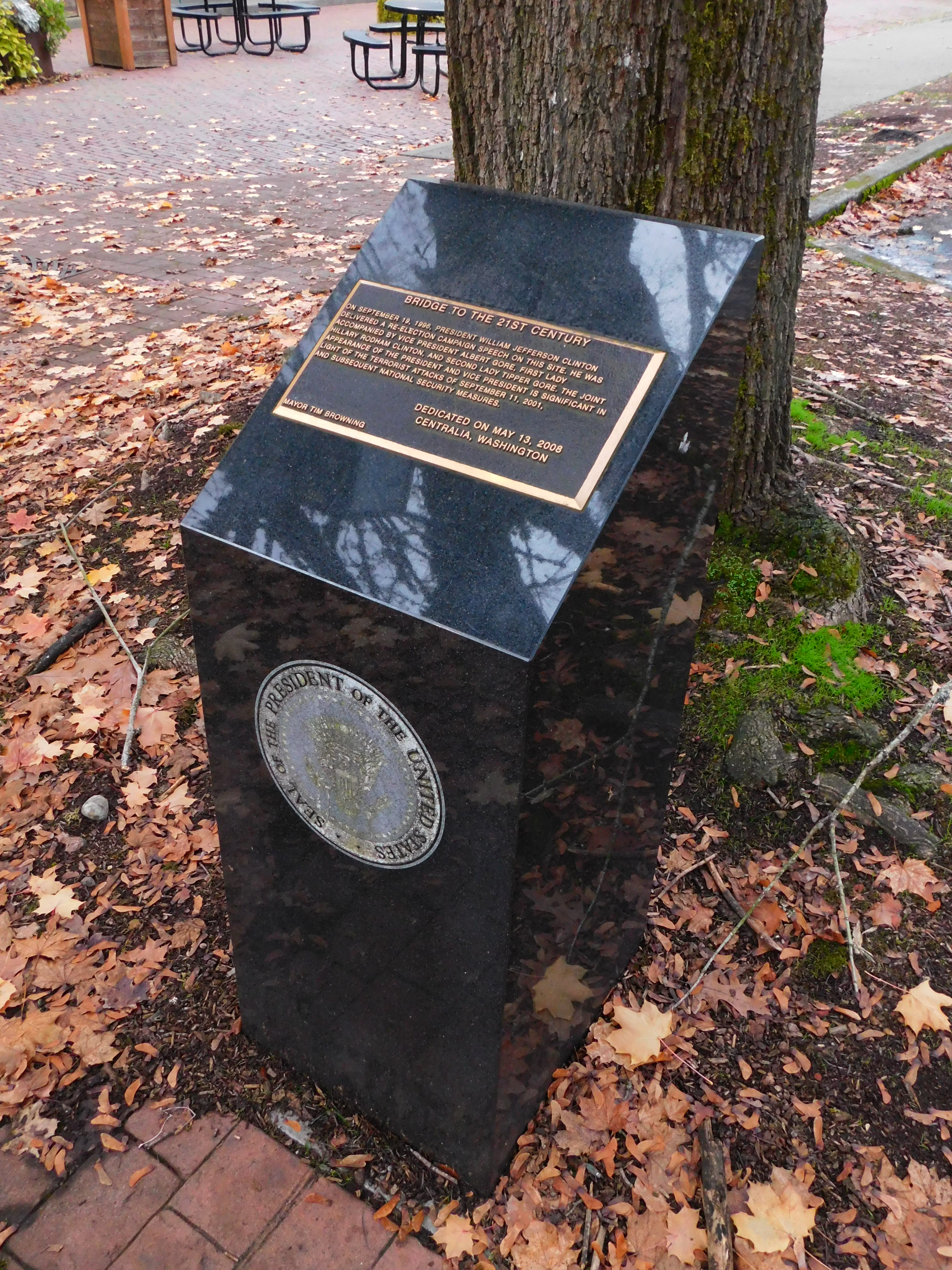
Plaque, President Clinton visit, 2025

The Centralia Downtown Historic District was listed to the National Register of Historic Places on August 18, 2003.

The city was awarded an "Outstanding Design Project" award in 2003 from the Washington Department of Community, Trade and Economic Development in recognition for the early 2000s revitalization efforts of the downtown district. Union Station received a similar award.

In May 2026, as part of the Downtown Centralia Historic Walk tour, the city's Centralia Downtown Association began installing plaques on recognized historic buildings in the district. Initial markers were added to the Elk Building, Fox Theater, Landers Building, and the Olympic Club; a plaque for the Howell Hotel was part of the effort but was not available during the unveiling ceremony.
