= Rogers Building (Vancouver) =

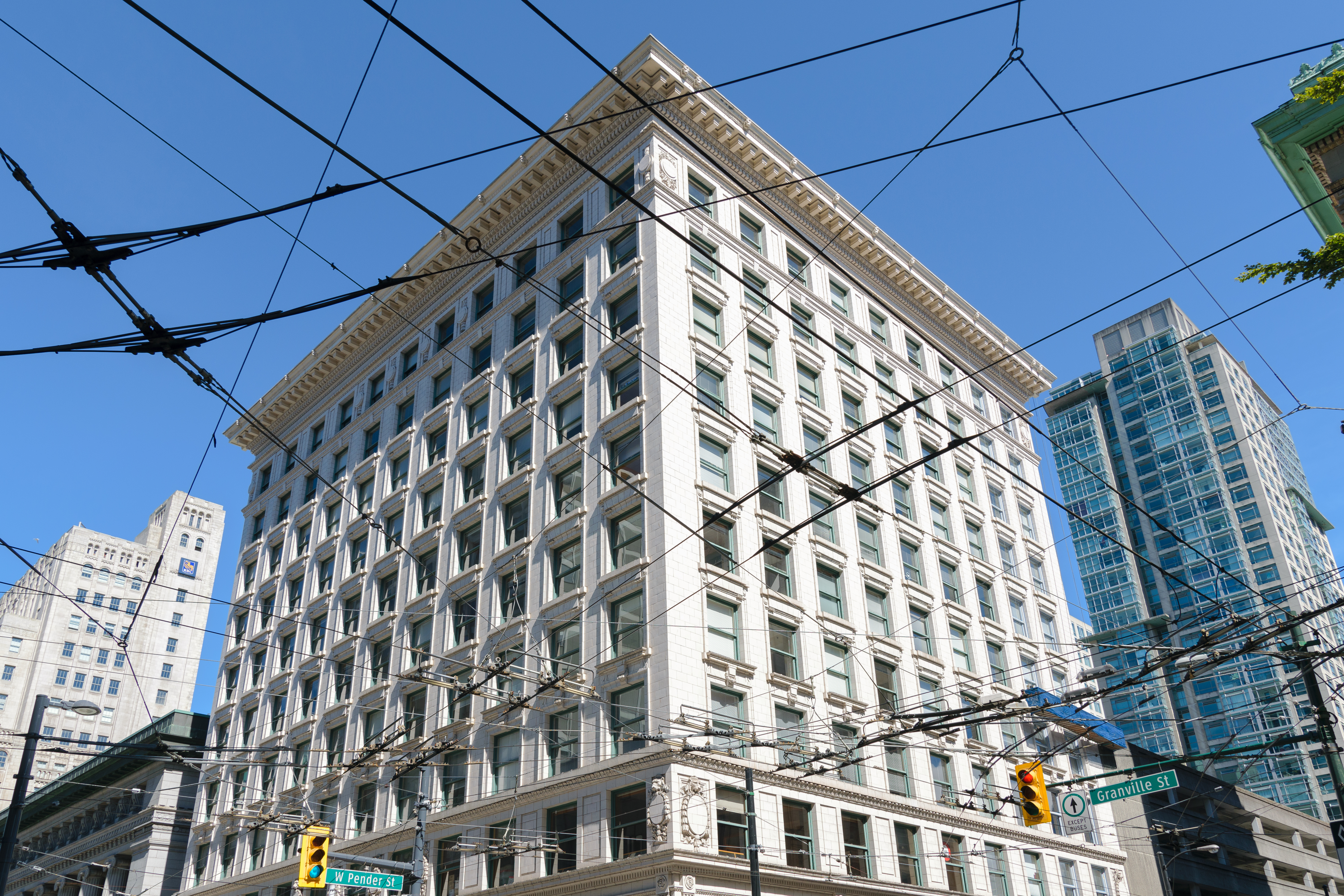
- Interactive map of the Rogers Building area

General information
- Type: Commercial office building
- Architectural style: Edwardian Commercial
- Location: 470 Granville Street, Vancouver, British Columbia, Canada
- Coordinates: 49.2847°N 123.1133°W
- Construction started: 1911
- Construction stopped: 1912
- Cost: $600,000
- Owner: Equitable Real Estate Investment Corp.

Height
- Height: 120 ft (37 m)

Technical details
- Structural system: Steel skeleton frame with concrete infill
- Floor count: 10

Design and construction
- Architects: Gould & Champney (A. Warren Gould & Édouard Frère Champney)
- Developer: Jonathan Rogers

The Rogers Building is a ten-storey heritage commercial office building located at 470 Granville Street, at the corner of Granville and Pender streets, in downtown Vancouver, British Columbia, Canada. Completed in 1912, it was designed by the Seattle architectural firm of Gould & Champney in the Edwardian Commercial style for developer Jonathan Rogers. At the time of its completion, it was one of the tallest buildings in Canada and the first ten-storey reinforced concrete structure of its kind in the country. The building has been listed on the Vancouver Heritage Register as a Class A heritage property since 1986.

== History ==
=== Construction ===
Welsh-born contractor Jonathan Rogers commissioned the building in 1911. Rogers had initially engaged the Seattle firm of Gould & Champney to design a structure known as the Glyn Building, but ultimately opted for a more economical design that omitted some of the earlier plan's ornamentation. The building permit was issued on 31 May 1911, with a listed construction value of $550,000. Construction began the following day, and the structural frame was completed by 19 February 1912. The final construction cost was approximately $600,000.

The Daily Province reported at the time that "at the corner of Pender Street West and Granville Street the Rogers Building is the latest ideas of reinforced concrete construction and the first ten storey of its kind in Canada."

=== Ownership ===
Jonathan Rogers retained ownership of the building from its completion until 1927, when he sold it to Major General Francis Arthur Sutton for over $1 million, which was reported as Vancouver's largest real estate transaction to that date. Sutton, a British military adventurer known as "One-Arm Sutton" after losing part of his right arm at the Battle of Gallipoli, had arrived in Vancouver with plans to open the Peace River region by constructing a railway linking Vancouver and Edmonton. When Sutton's ventures failed, Rogers's wife Elisabeth foreclosed on the building for a second mortgage in 1938, and the building was sold back to Jonathan Rogers in 1940.

Following Rogers's death in 1945, the building remained in his estate until 1955, when it was sold to the Leon and Thea Koerner Foundation for $1.25 million. In 1976, the Koerner Foundation sold the Rogers Building to Equitable Real Estate Investment Corp. for $2.25 million. Equitable Real Estate has owned and managed the building since that time.

=== Notable tenants ===
O.B. Allan Jewellers occupied the southeast corner storefront from the building's opening in 1912 until the 1980s. The Chinese Consulate maintained offices in the building. Sorensen's Cafeteria, which operated in the basement. Dunn's Tailors was a tenant from 1995 to 2020, notable for an Art Deco neon sign dating from 1946. Heritage consultant Donald Luxton and Vancouver historian Chuck Davis both maintained offices in the building during the 1990s.

At capacity, the building housed over 1,000 daily occupants and received approximately 18,000 visitors per day.

== Architecture ==
=== Design and style ===
The Rogers Building was designed in the Edwardian Commercial style by architects Augustus Warren Gould and Édouard Frère Champney. Heritage scholar Edward Mills described the style as "of the modern French Renaissance," reflecting the Beaux-Arts training of both architects. The design has been compared to Gould's earlier American Savings Bank and Empire Building (1906) in Seattle, with both possessing "elaborate ground floor bases, elegant but light classical cornices and a somewhat plainer, flat series of storey in the intermediate stage."

The building is arranged in a horseshoe (U-shaped) configuration around a 24-foot (7.3 m) central light well, a design that ensured natural illumination for all of its approximately 342 office spaces. The Granville Street frontage measures 120 feet (37 m) and the Pender Street frontage 104 feet (32 m), with a total height of approximately 120 feet (37 m).

=== Materials ===
The building's structural system consists of a steel skeleton frame with poured concrete infill. Exterior materials were sourced from across North America and Europe:

- Ground floor: Monumental Ionic columns of red granite shipped from Aberdeen, Scotland
- Upper storeys: Cream-coloured glazed terracotta shipped in fifteen carloads from Chicago
- Cornice: Ornamental galvanized steel with dentils
- Entrance doors: Solid bronze, costing $2,500 at the time of construction

Interior finishes included white Italian marble in the hallways, with additional marble selections from Alaska, Vermont, and Tennessee on the ground floor. Flooring throughout consisted of cork glued to cement and topped with 60,000 feet of "Battleship" linoleum imported from England. Ornamental ironwork was sourced from Minneapolis and St. Paul, and five Otis-Fensom elevators were supplied from Toronto.

=== Mechanical systems ===
The building featured an advanced ventilation system for its era, in which air was filtered through falling water, cooled in summer and heated by steam in winter. Heating was provided by two 150-horsepower Babcock & Wilcox boilers operating at 160 psi and fuelled by oil. The elevator system employed six-cable suspension with safety governors and a "flash-light indicator" system to display car positions.

The building also featured amenities uncommon for the period, including a full basement cafeteria, a barbershop, and dedicated women's facilities with tea service and an attendant.

== Architects ==
=== Augustus Warren Gould ===
Augustus Warren Gould (c. 1871–1922) was born in Amherst, Nova Scotia. He pursued private studies in architecture at the Massachusetts Institute of Technology but did not formally enrol, instead gaining practical experience in a Boston architectural and construction firm. He moved to Seattle and established a practice in 1905. His notable earlier works in Seattle included the American Savings Bank and Empire Building (1906), which were among the earliest reinforced concrete structures in the United States. He served as President of the Washington State Society of Architects from 1917 to 1918.

=== Édouard Frère Champney ===
Édouard Frère Champney (1874–1929) held degrees from Harvard University and the École des Beaux-Arts in Paris. He began his career with the New York firm of Carrère and Hastings, working on the Pan-American Exposition of 1901 in Buffalo. He subsequently served as Assistant Chief Architect of the Louisiana Purchase Exposition (1904) in St. Louis, contributed to the planning of the Lewis and Clark Centennial Exposition (1905) in Portland, and was chief architect of the Alaska-Yukon-Pacific Exposition (1909) in Seattle. The Gould & Champney partnership lasted from 1909 to 1912, during which time the Rogers Building was one of only two designs the pair produced for Vancouver.

== Heritage recognition ==
The Rogers Building was listed on the Vancouver Heritage Register as a Class A heritage property on 23 September 1986. The classification recognizes the building's historical and architectural significance as a landmark of Vancouver's pre-World War I economic prosperity and its innovative use of reinforced concrete construction.

In 2003, the exterior lobby and a section of the retail storefront received the City of Vancouver Heritage Award of Merit following their restoration.

In 2019, when Reliance Properties proposed a 29-storey office tower at 443 Seymour Street on the adjacent lot, the City of Vancouver required the new structure to incorporate a 12-foot (3.7 m) setback from the shared property line above the sixth floor to preserve public views of the Rogers Building's heritage façade.

== Jonathan Rogers ==
Jonathan Rogers (1865–1945) was born at Plas-Onn, near Llangollen, Denbighshire, in North Wales, and grew up speaking only Welsh. At age 16, he moved to Liverpool, where he worked while learning English. In May 1887, aged 22, he sailed for Montreal and crossed Canada on one of the first transcontinental trains to reach Vancouver. Shortly after arrival, he attended an early public auction of Canadian Pacific Railway land parcels in the new city, purchasing four lots that would later sit in the heart of downtown.

Rogers began working as a painter before becoming a construction contractor, eventually undertaking offices, manufacturing plants, hotels, banks, and an electricity-generating station during Vancouver's building boom. He served two terms as a city alderman, 26 years on the Vancouver Park Board (nine as chairman), and two terms as president of the Vancouver Board of Trade.

In 1902, Rogers married Elisabeth in England. The couple were among the founders of the Vancouver Art Gallery.

Rogers died on 8 December 1945. His will left approximately $250,000 to various causes in Vancouver, including a $100,000 bequest to the City of Vancouver for the creation of a neighbourhood park in a disadvantaged area. Jonathan Rogers Park, occupying a full block in the Mount Pleasant neighbourhood, was dedicated in his name in 1958.

== Current use ==
The Rogers Building continues to operate as a commercial office building with ground-floor retail. As of 2024, retail tenants include Trees Coffee, One Under, and Coco Bubble Tea. The building's elevators were modernized in 2023–2024, and upgraded common washrooms, secure bicycle storage, and shower facilities have been added. The building is managed by Equitable Real Estate Investment Corp., whose profits are distributed through a charitable foundation supporting causes including alternative medicine and cancer research.

== See also ==
- List of heritage buildings in Vancouver
- Francis Arthur Sutton
- A. Warren Gould
- Édouard Frère Champney
- Granville Street, Vancouver
