= Old City Hall Historic District =

Historic district in Washington, United States

- U.S. National Register of Historic Places
- U.S. Historic district
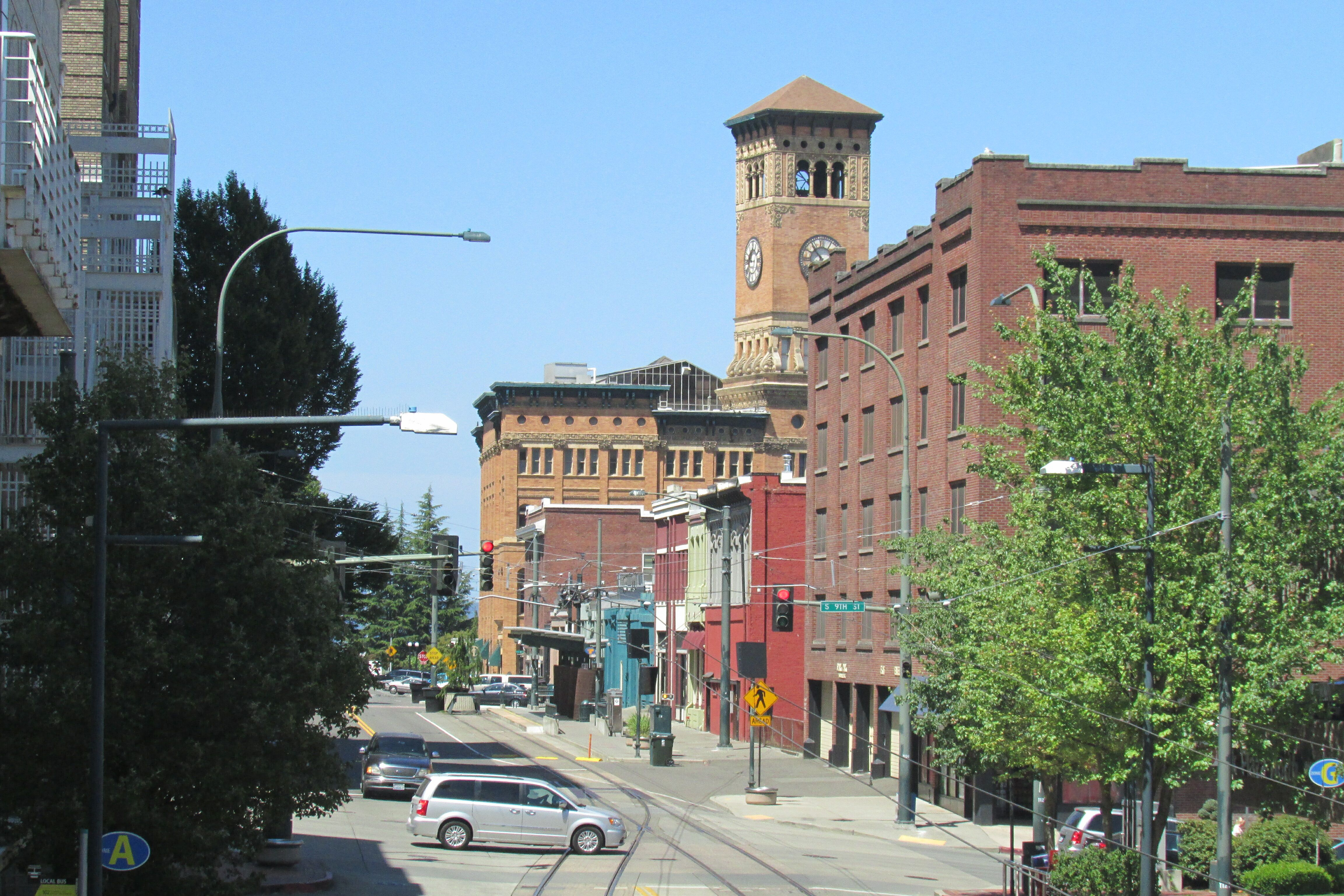
- Pacific Street looking north

- Location within Washington (state)
- Interactive map showing the location for Tacoma Old City Hall Historic District
- Location: Roughly bounded by St. Helens Ave., Court C, freeway spur, 7th and 9th Sts., Tacoma, Washington
- Area: 16.5 acres (6.7 ha)
- Architect: Darmer, C.A.; Et al.
- Architectural style: Late 19th And 20th Century Revivals, Italianate, Second Renaissance Revival
- NRHP reference No.: 77001352
- Added to NRHP: December 23, 1977

The Old City Hall Historic District is located on a bluff at the north end of Tacoma's business district, overlooking Commencement Bay. The Old City Hall and the Northern Pacific Office Building stabilize the northern boundary of the district and the Pantages Theatre/Jones Building just south of the district boundary, complements the Winthrop Hotel.

All blocks are laid out so that major building entrances face the streets, which run north and south, and the buildings are constructed with common walls, which cover the entire depth of the block, deleting any need for alleys. Thus, with the exception of Pacific Avenue, where business fronts face each other, business fronts tend to be located on the east. The western exposures represent the back of the structures. From the bluff to Pacific Avenue the land is level, but Commerce and Broadway form terraces on the steep hillside. As a result, a facade which appears as a single story on the west side of the street is scaled a full three stories on the east. The pivotal structures dominate the District skyline. As a result, there are a number of vistas that rise and conclude within the boundaries. Views north along Broadway, Commerce and Pacific conclude with the Elks Temple, Old City Hall and Northern Pacific Office Building. Similarly, sight lines from the eastern portion of the district terminate with the last two buildings mentioned. Views to the south along Broadway are distinctly terminated by the Winthrop and Bostwick Hotels as they are on Commerce by virtue of the dominance of the Winthrop Hotel and the Motoramp Garage.

There are only three exceptions to the structural density in the District. There is an open parking lot immediately to the north of the Tacoma Motoramp Garage. Fire destroyed the original structure on this site, a business block stylistically cohesive with those to its north along the western side of Pacific. The second exception was noted above, the parking lots in the 802 block. The third consists of lots on Commerce Street to the north and south of the Morris Motors (Wright) building (south of the Spanish Stairs). There is some indication that these spaces were never developed.

== Significant Buildings ==
=== Pacific Ave. ===
Street Frontage

The bulk of the structures exhibit Italianate or eclectic treatments of many different kinds. The most uniform collection of facades exists between 726 and 736 Pacific Avenue. The Weeks Building (734–6 Pacific) and the Davie Building (732 Pacific) retain unmodified first floor storefronts. In the rest, segmented arch window openings predominate, occasionally with hood ornaments (711-17 Pacific).

Northern Pacific Bldg

Tacoma was designated the Northern Pacific terminus and headquarters in 1873. Transportation has dominated Old City Hall Historic District ever since. Tacoma was chosen for its natural deep-water port, and its trade to the Far East Trade. The railroad wharfs were located in the plains below the hill where the Northern Pacific Headquarters building sited. The shipping docks and the Municipal Dock were the Tacoma Hotel. Here people would congregate upon arrival in the city. Their need for housing supported the hotels, boarding houses and furnished rooms in this area.

=== Commerce Street ===
Old City Hall and Spanish Steps

The utilitarian brick and glass facades of the garage buildings along Commerce and Broadway represent an important type of structure. Some of the structures approach the Commercial style although none as fully as the Motoramp Garage (741-47 Commerce); the Morris Motors Building (711 Broadway) has Commercial elements as does the Colonial Hotel (701 Commerce).

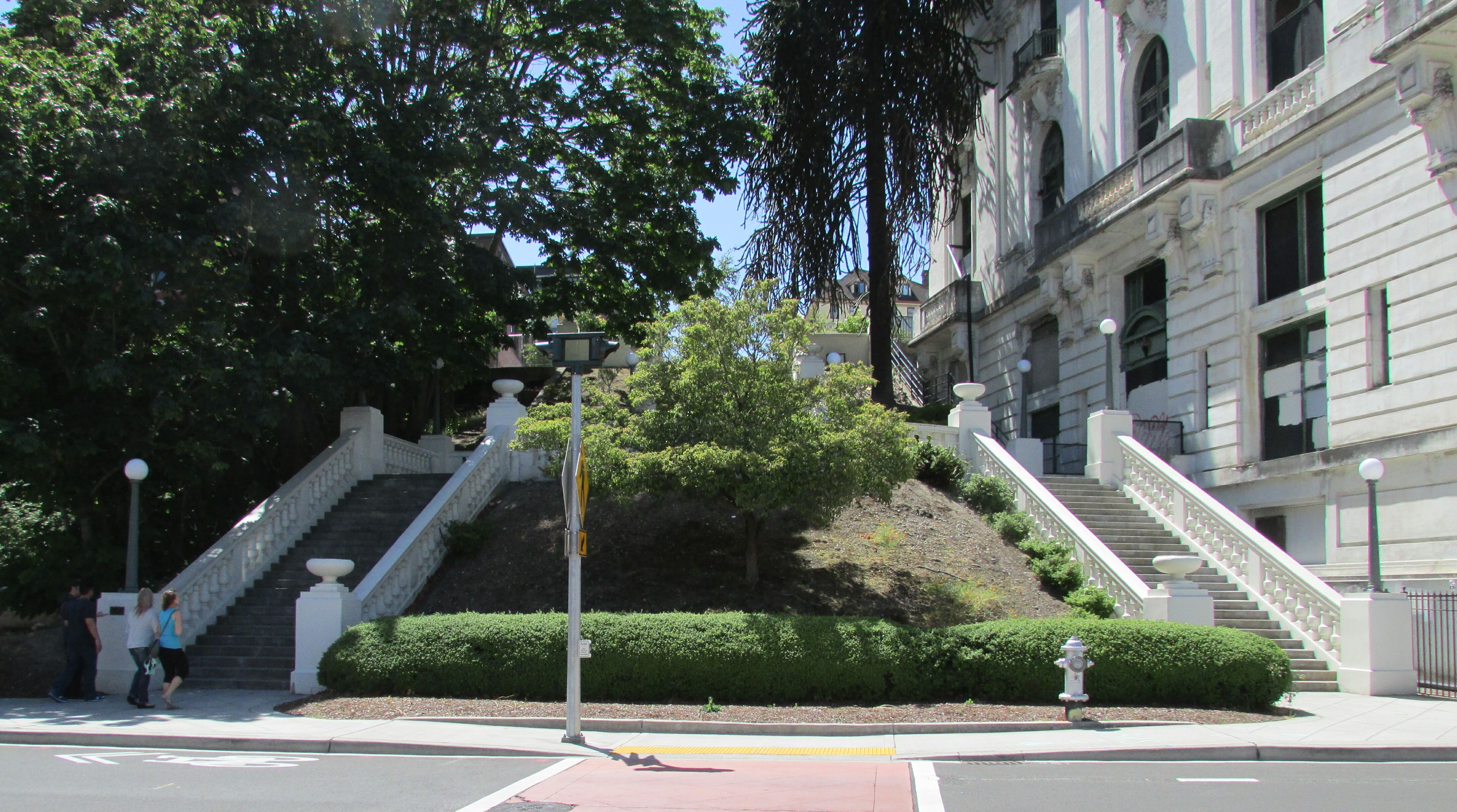
Spanish Steps

Of even greater significance at this time, when the proximity of a residential neighborhood to the north of the Elks Temple is understood, is the Spanish Steps to the south of this edifice. Were these not to exist, pedestrian access to the City Hall from Broadway would have constituted a lengthy detour around business blocks. These stairs were built to satisfy city fire code requirements for a second story exit from the Elks Temple, and it is unknown if pedestrian access was noted as a determining factor of their design. However, in 1936, when the Elks Club attempted to close the stairs to the public, city officials intervened as legal owners of the dedicated street, thus emphasizing the importance of the steps to foot traffic.

=== Broadway ===
Elks Temple

The Elks Temple is distinctive because of its size, details, and white color. The Second Renaissance Revival design rises in reinforced concrete from Commerce Street on a heavy water table. The first story is rusticated and has its principal approach through the south wall from the terrace level of the Spanish Stairs, midway between Broadway and Commerce. Immediately above and facing on Broadway is the main building entrance. The entrance facade is divided into three bays, each with a round arched window opening at street level. Each second story window is provided with a small iron-railed balcony supported by a scrolled bracket or keystone and decorated with pancarpi. The bays are separated by pilasters surmounted with Ionic capitals. Immediately above the second story windows is an entablature capped by a monumental parapet with antefixae. The same treatment continues on the east and south although the north elevation is not articulated. The south elevation, facing the Spanish Stairs, is five bays wide. At each end bay there is a rectangular opening in place of the round arched window; an oeil-de-boeuf executed as a cartouche appears above these openings. The balance of the windows are treated as on the Broadway elevation although balconets of several styles are provided the windows on the south and east that correspond to the street level window level on the west.

Winthrop Hotel

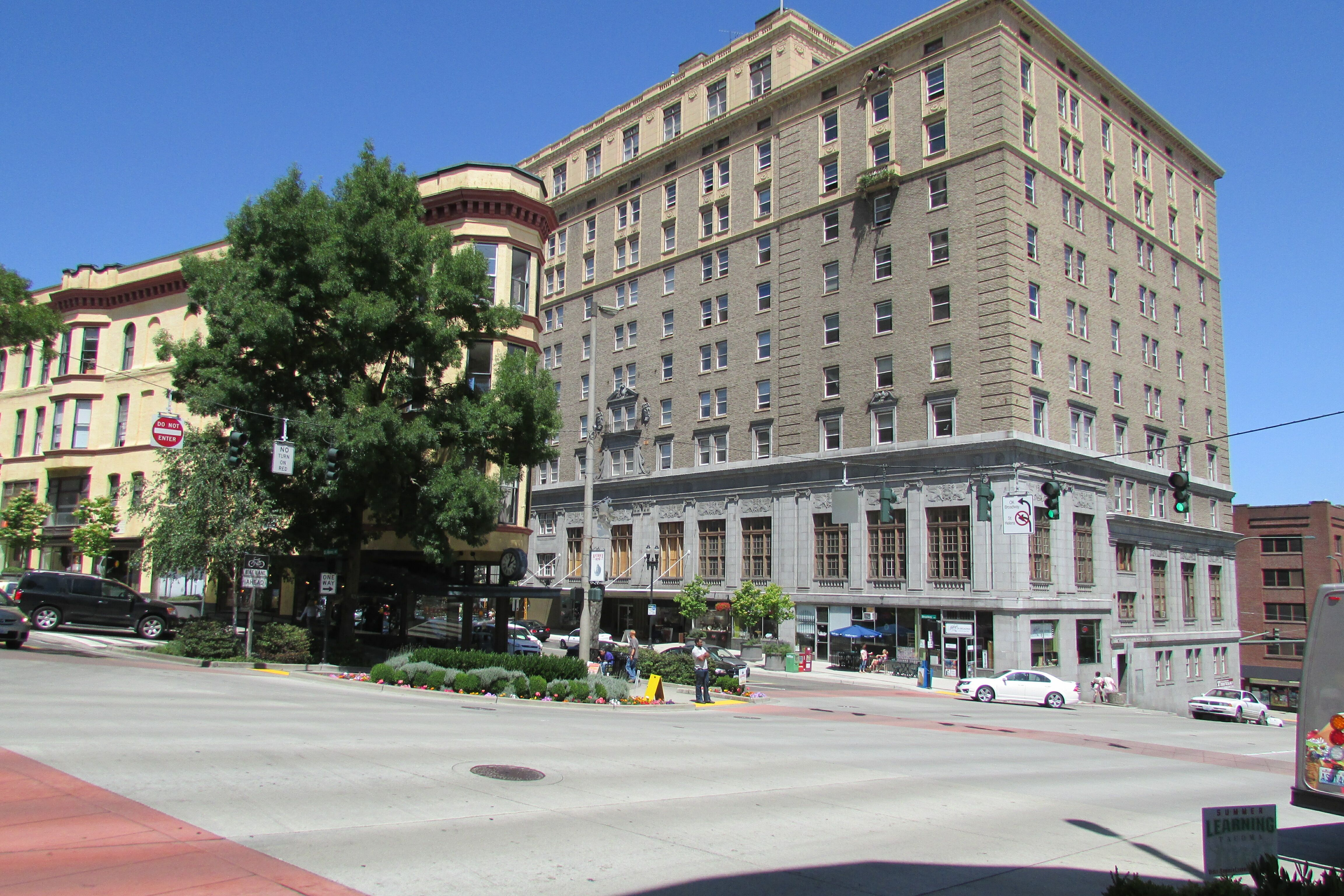
Winthrop Hotel, Broadway @ Ninth, Tacoma, Washington

The opening of the Winthrop Hotel, named after Theodore Winthrop, pioneer American explorer and first to refer to "The Mountain" as Mt. Tacoma, was a grand event, the signal of better things to come for the entire Tacoma citizenry, an example of what the city could do if given the chance. The financing was done by Tacomans, it was built by Tacomans – a true community effort. A quote from a 1928 news article explains it best:

From the manager on down through the ranks of the many employees> the organization is Northwestern in character and not Californian. It reflects an identification with the Northwest, a spirit typically Northwestern and a hospitality that Pacific Northwesterners may readily distinguish, in character as their own. Tourists will find that the Winthrop has a personality of its own, distinguished from that encountered of hotels in other parts of the country. Thus, the hotel functioned until the early 1970s when it was converted into apartments for senior citizens.

The Winthrop Hotel is a brick-faced concrete structure rising nine stories. It serves as an anchor for the southwest corner of the district. The greatest mass of the Second Renaissance Revival building is executed in a tan brick on a U-shaped plan. This main body rests upon a broad two-story base of gray terra cotta.

The first level on Commerce Ave. is unadorned. The second story has tall window openings flanked by sets of pilasters. Paired griffins face each other between the pilasters above the windows. An entablature rests upon the pilasters and encircles the entire building. On Commerce Ave, the entablature appears as an intermediate cornice. The surrounds of the small windows resting on the entablature are decorated with the same gray terra cotta. The windows of the next four floors are not decorated. Above the seventh floor there is an intermediate cornice of tan stone and the windows of the remaining floors are enhanced with surrounds of the same material. The space between the windows of the eighth and ninth floors is decorated with a swag and the facade itself executed in a lighter shade of brick. A penthouse appears above the ninth story cornice. It is of a still lighter shade of brick and is finished with such refinements as pilasters, rusticated brickwork, quoins and swag ornaments; a balustrade caps the penthouse cornice.

=== St. Helens Street ===
Bostwick Hotel

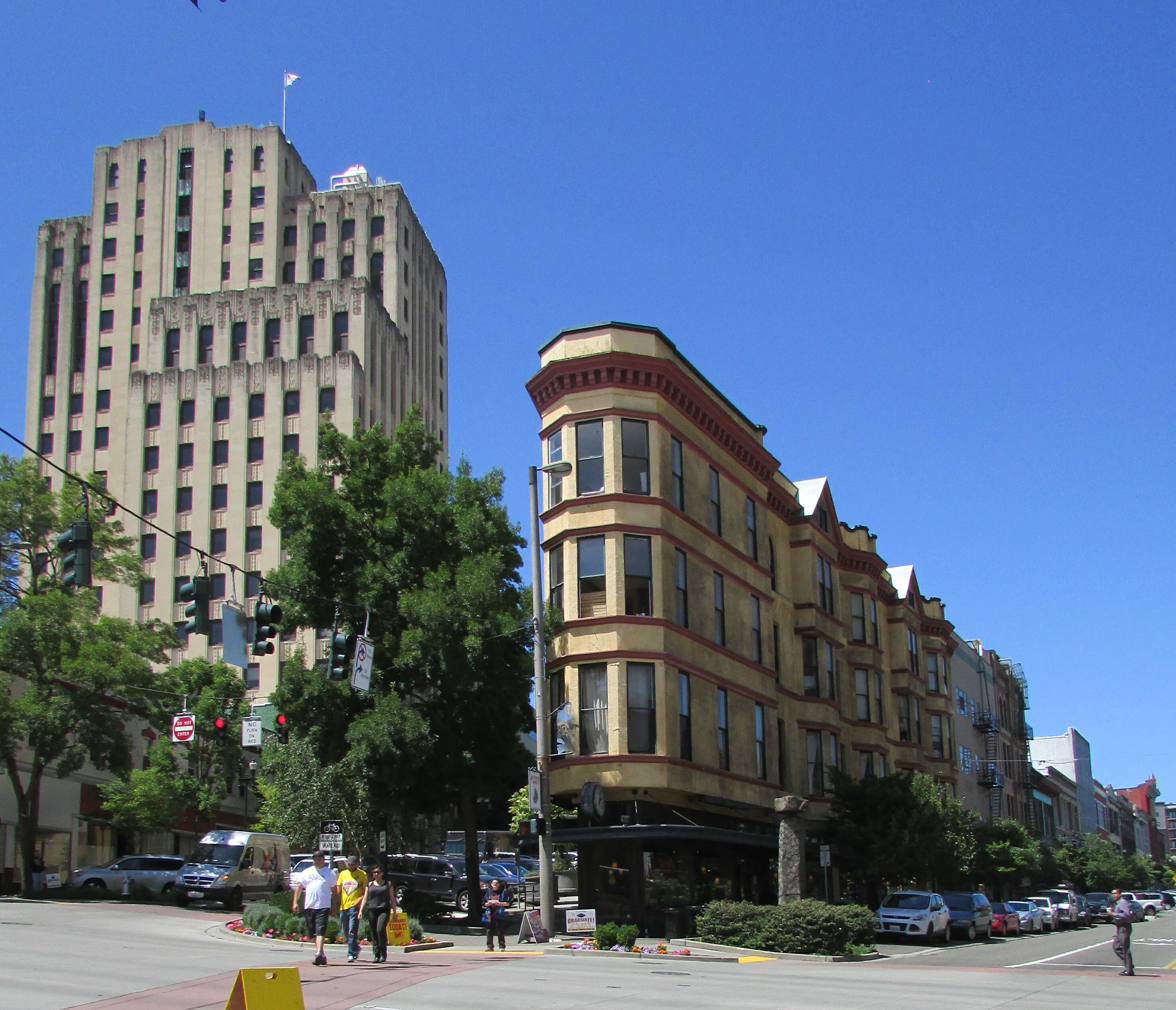
Old Bostwick Hotel, Tacoma, Washington

Probably the most interesting of the primary structures is the Bostwick Hotel. It was built in 1889 by Henry Clay Bostwick. The Bostwick is situated on a triangular junction between St. Helens, Broadway and Ninth Streets. It is the only remaining structure of three building built at the same time. The other two were the Tacoma Theater and the Gross Bros. Store. This development spurred construction in downtown Tacoma during the 1890s. The hotel was located in the top three floors. The main floor housed the Western Trust Company of Tacoma. The facade has significant relief with a repeating pattern to the bays and recesses. The effect is heightened by a gable roof on every other bay. A parapet connects the gables and runs the circumference of the building. The surface of the building was covered with boards and moldings, dividing it into a series of rectangles and squares. Major changes occurred in 1924 with a layer of stucco or gunite covering the decorative panels and the removal of two bays at the northern end. The ground floor store fronts have been expanded from the original, but it remains very similar to when it was built.

== Fireman's Park ==
In 1894, three years after completion of the fire station, which remained the headquarters for the Tacoma Fire Department until 1968, Firemen's Park was constructed on a triangular piece of land to the north of the station. By remembering that the City Hall was completed the previous year, we can see the outer rim of the District connected and Whiskey Row encircled. The original Firemen's Park, overlooking Commencement Bay and the tide flats, was a grass-covered area where many of the original fir and cedar trees had been retained along its eastern boundary. It was the first park in the downtown area. Memorial trees and rose garden were planted in the park and ivy engulfed the fire station, when it became known as "pretty little Firemen's Park". Two features associated with the park are Fawcett's Fountain and the Tacoma Totem Pole. The fountain, which originally stood at the junction of Broadway, St. Helens and Ninth Street, is a copy of a municipal fountain, which sat on a wharf at Long Beach, California. It was presented to the city in 1908 by A. V. Fawcett, an early Tacoma Mayor. His purpose was to assure that anyone walking along the street could get a cool drink of water. It is a tumulus of rusticated stone with three drinking fountains. In the 1940s, it was moved to Firemen's Park. It is now located in a park located between the Northern Pacific Headquarters building and the Bradley Hotel at Seventh and Pacific, and has been restored to working condition.

== Alterations ==
The most common alteration is the street-level storefronts. Sometimes the treatment is minor, such as the unification suggested by the owner's sign spanning the dissimilar facades at 722–726 Pacific. Sometimes the alterations have greater impact, such as the joining of a three-story Commercial style building with a single story store front by the device of an arcaded brick facade which bears no relationship to the buildings it masks or to the structures on either side (811-13 Pacific). Some alterations, such as the loss of a cornice (Olympus Hotel and 718-20 Pacific, for example) are not immediately noticeable and appear related to seismic considerations. Other alterations are more permanent and damaging: most of the intrusive structures in the District are actually historic buildings that have been altered beyond recognition. The intrusions have little real impact on the appearance of the district since in every case but one the setback is the same as the surrounding structures. The typical intrusion is an emasculated historic building finished with an applied facade material (819-23 Pacific and 738 Broadway).

== Architectural Style ==
Intrusive modern construction and the disruption of the original facade lines are, therefore, the major features, which separate the District from its surroundings to the south, particularly along Pacific Avenue. The quality of mutually supporting facades exists within the District and not immediately outside. Although some of this cohesiveness has been disrupted through intrusive alterations, it has not been done to the point of destroying the continuity. Late 19th century eclectic styles blend to present a street view of an earlier date than the surrounding area. One is allowed to step back in time and view an architectural microcosm with relatively few intrusions.

== Architects ==
Architects have been identified for the pivotal structures and for several of the primary structures. Their contributions span the history outlined relative to the District. Some were practicing Tacoma architects; others of stature were commissioned from the East and Middle West. Their buildings reflect training and experience, which range from the traditional American method of apprenticeship to training at the Beaux Arts in Paris.

- Charles B. Talbot, who began designing the Northern Pacific Headquarters building in 1886, was an architect for the railroad. He was also one of their Vice presidents and a professional photographer. He is known most for his series of blueprint photographs (in the Washington State Historical Society Museum) documenting railroad construction related to the Northern Pacific in Washington State. He undoubtedly operated the blueprint apparatus atop the Northern Pacific Headquarters building.
- Hatherton and Mclntosh of San Francisco won the contest for the design of the Tacoma Chamber of Commerce building in 1890. This was to be at Seventh and Pacific Avenue the site of the Old City Hall. A land swap occurred, which placed the Chamber of Commerce building at the corner of Ninth and Broadway (the location of the Winthrop Hotel). The cornerstone of the old City Hall credits Hatherton as the architect for the building. He was the official architect for the city of San Francisco and designed its city hall.
- C. A. Darmer and Frederick Heath were two architects in Tacoma. Both of these men's work spanned several decades within the city. C. A. Darmer was born in Germany and received his architectural training there. He worked for architectural firms in both San Francisco and Portland, Oregon and first arrived in Tacoma in 1884. In 1885, Darmer and William Farrell became partners. Darmer became the "official" architect for Charles B. Wright, the Philadelphia. Darmer's work can be seen throughout Pierce County and Western Washington State. His early work within the Old City Hall Historic District can be seen in the blocks along the western side of Pacific Avenue (1886–1888). Later he designed the Bradley Garage at 707 Pacific (1906) and the Olympus Hotel at 815 Pacific (1909). It is possible, too, that he designed the small building to the south of the Olympus Hotel (1904).
- Heath and Twichell designed the Park Hotel at Eighth and A (1909). He was the official architect for the Tacoma School District, and is known for his redesign of the Tacoma Land Company Hotel. Originally designed by the Philadelphia architects G. W. Hewitt and W. D. Hewitt, the hotel became Stadium High School, named after the stadium (1909–1910), which Health also designed. Commercial structures of his design include the National Realty building (Puget Sound National Bank, 1909–1911).
- E. Frere Champney designed the Elks Temple. He graduated from the Ecole des Beaux Arts in 1900. He started with Carrere and Hastings of Buffalo, New York, becoming the chief designer for the firm's projects at the Pan-American Exposition. Champney left to work for the federal government, where he his exposition work in St. Louis (1904) and at the Lewis and Clark Exposition (1905) in Portland, Oregon. In 1907, he moved to Seattle, and later e formed a partnership with Augustus Warren Gould.
- W. L. Stoddard of New York City was chosen by the Citizen's Hotel Corporation for the Winthrop Hotel project based on his work on prior large hotels. Stoddard graduated from Columbia University, and apprenticed under various New York firms. In 1908 he started his own practice. Other hotel he designed included; the Lord Baltimore in Baltimore, Maryland, the Reading in Reading, Pennsylvania, and the Tutweiler in Birmingham, Alabama.

== Bibliography ==
- City Directories: 1891 1906 plus others needed to establish major 1892 1912–13 dates, business, and owners 1897 1916
- Special manuscript file on Tacoma Totem Pole, Washington State Historical Society Library
- Newspaper clipping files at the Tacoma Public Library: Hotels, Winthrop Hotel and Puget South Electric Railroad Company
- HUNT, Herbert. Tacoma: Its History and Its Builders. 3 Vols. Chicago, S.J. Clarke,1916
- PROSCH, Thomas. McCarver and Tacoma. Seattle, Lowman and Hanford, 1906.
- Hans Bergman, ed. History of Scandinavians in Tacoma and Pierce County with Brief
- History of Tacoma and Early Settlement. Tacoma, 1926.
- DARMER, C. A. Review of the architectural work in the building construction of the Pacific Northwest, particularly in Tacoma, Washington, as^carried out by C. A. Darmer, Architect, c.1935, typescript, located in Tacoma Public Library, Northwest Room.
- JOSEPHSON, Matthew. The Robber Barons. New York, Harcourt, Brace and World, 1962.
- FLETCHER, Sir Banister. A History of Architecture on the Comparative Method. New York, Scribners, 1953.
- SIAS, Patricia A. An Examination of Influences on Selected Tacoma Architecture, 1890–1914. Tacoma, Washington, University of Puget Sound, 1971. Master Thesis.
- HARVEY, Paul W. Tacoma Headlines. Tacoma, Tacoma News Tribune, 1962.

== See also ==
- Rialto Theater
- National Register of Historic Places listings in Pierce County, Washington
