= Elks Temple (Tacoma, Washington) =

- U.S. Historic district – Contributing property
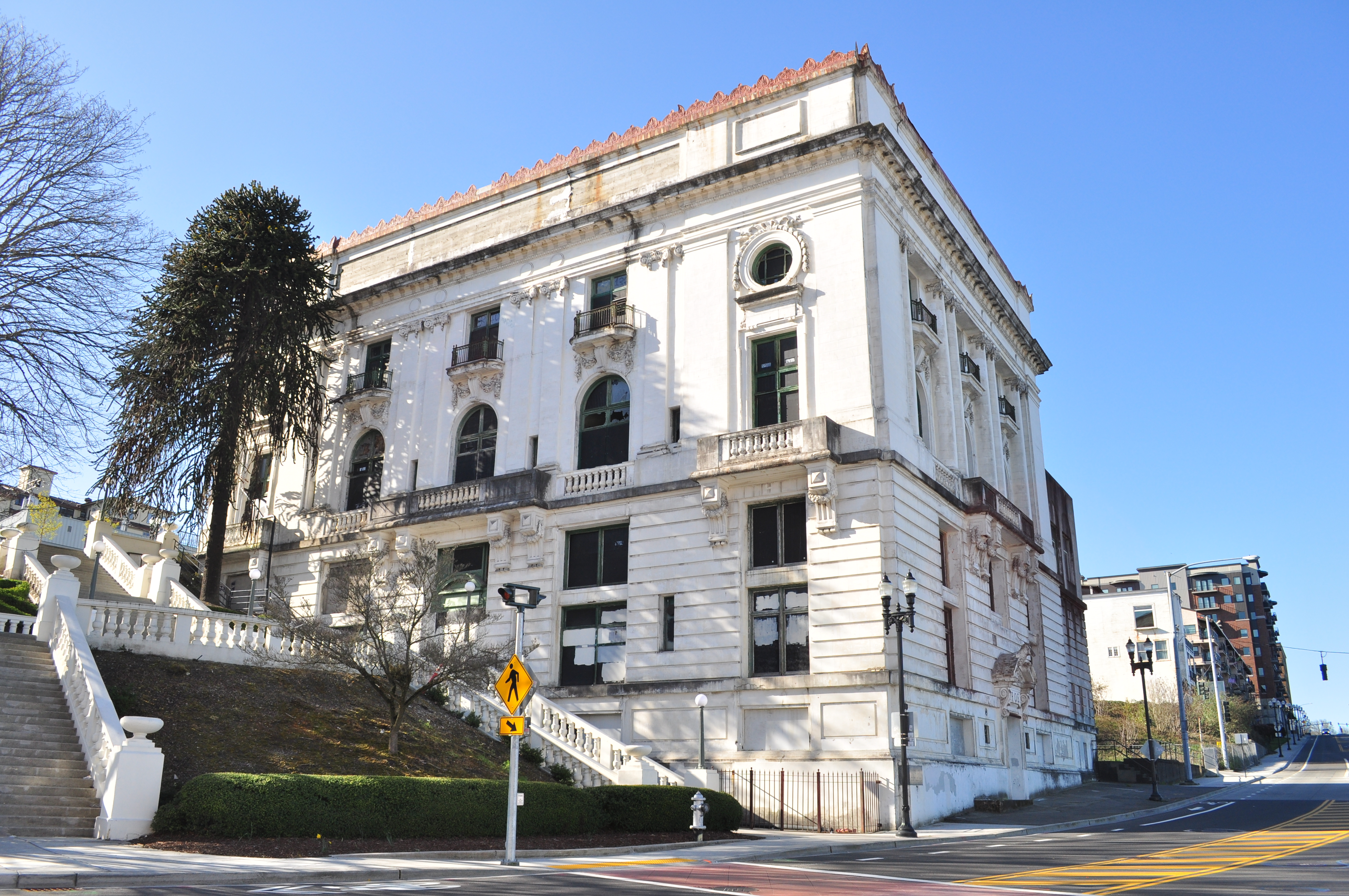

- Location within Washington (state)
- Coordinates: 47°15′28″N 122°26′27″W
- Built: 1916
- Architect: Édouard Frère Champney
- Architectural style: Beaux Arts
- Part of: Old City Hall Historic District (ID77001352)
- Added to NRHP: December 23, 1977

The Elks Temple in Tacoma, Washington is a historic Beaux Arts fraternal building built in 1916 for the Fraternal Order of Elks, now housing the McMenamins Elks Temple hotel, restaurant and event space.

The building is included in the Old City Hall Historic District, which is listed on the National Register of Historic Places in Pierce County.

== History ==
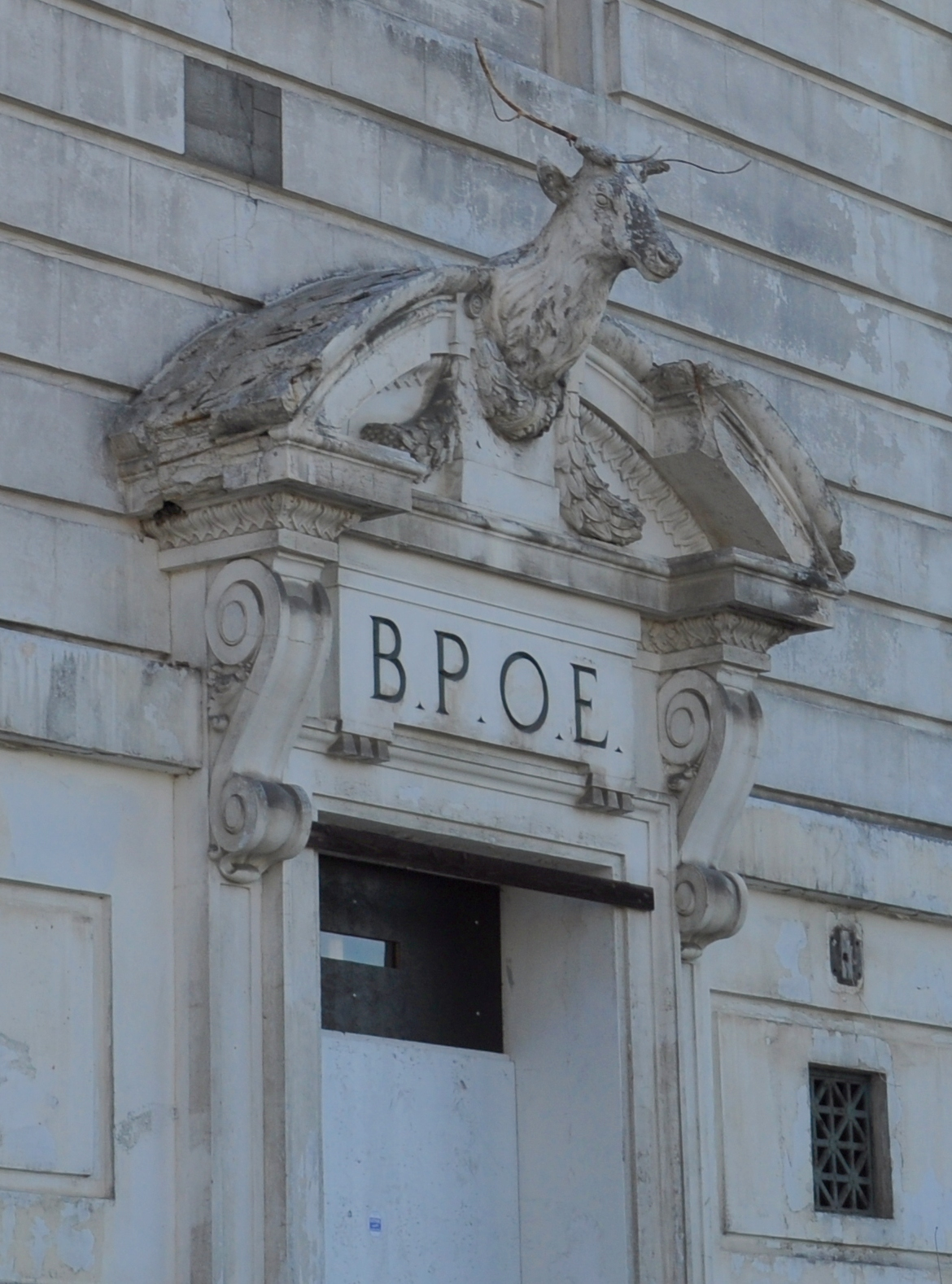
Detail

It was designed by architect Édouard Frère Champney, who graduated from the Ecole des Beaux Arts in 1900 and who worked at Carrere and Hastings in Buffalo, New York, as chief designer for the firm's projects at the Pan-American Exposition, and who later worked on structures at the 1904 St. Louis Exposition and at the 1905 Lewis and Clark Exposition in Portland, Oregon, before coming to Seattle in 1907.

The former temple, once derelict after years of abandonment, was purchased by McMenamins in 2007. Plans announced in July 2009 anticipated renovation by 2012, including conversion of the Elks Lodge's main meeting room space into 40 hotel rooms and full restoration of the adjacent Spanish Steps, another contributing element of the Old City Hall Historic District. Restoration was finally begun in earnest in 2017, and the building reopened on April 24, 2019, as the McMenamins Elks Temple.
