= Spanish Steps (Tacoma, Washington) =

Stairs in Tacoma, Washington, U.S.

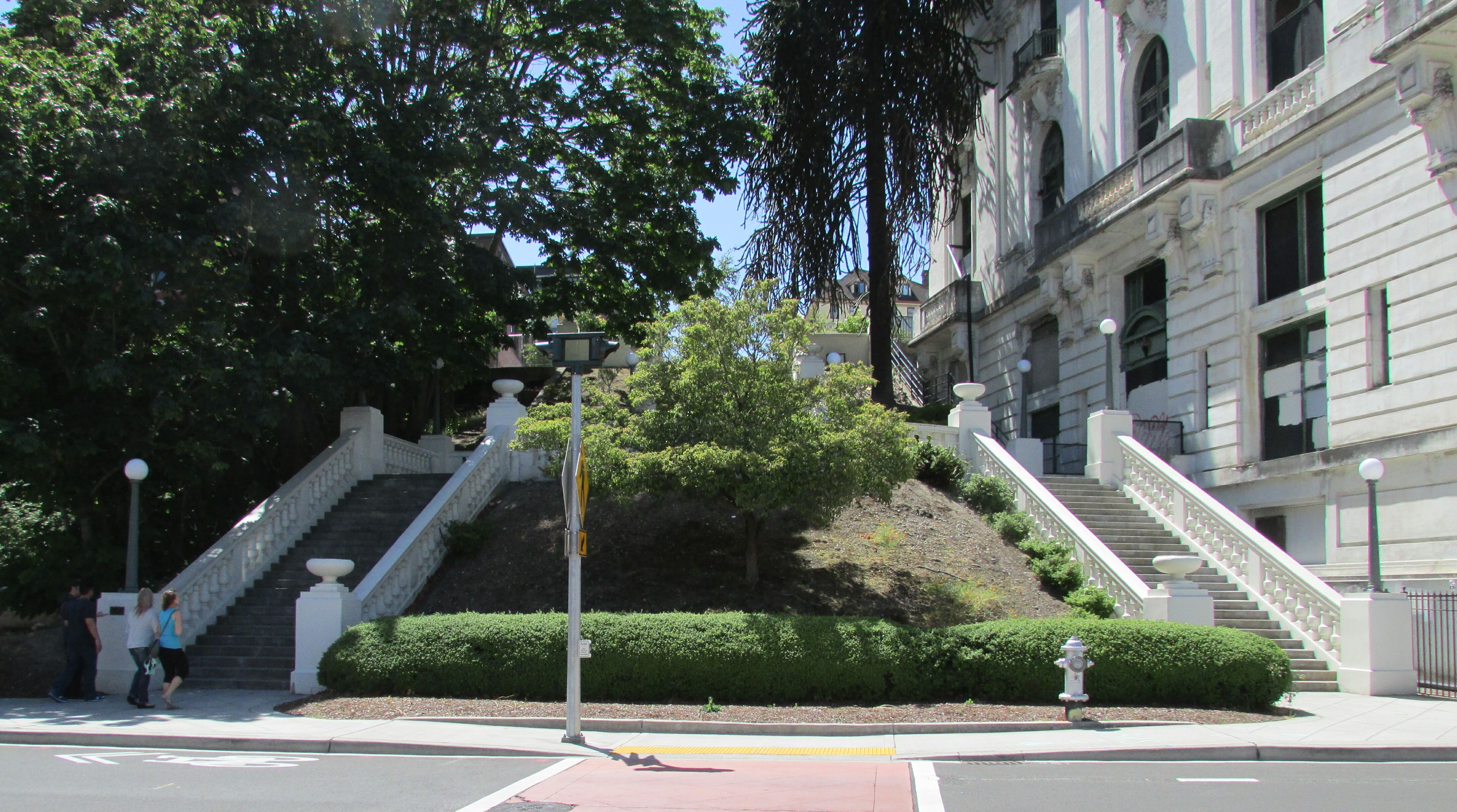
- The Spanish Steps in 2015
- Location: Tacoma, Washington, U.S.
- Location within Washington (state)
- Coordinates: 47°15′28″N 122°26′27″W

The Spanish Steps, also known as the Spanish Stairs, are stairs in Tacoma, Washington's Old City Hall Historic District, in the United States. Modeled after Rome's Piazza di Spagna, the stairs were built in 1916 to connect Broadway and Commerce. The stairs are adjacent to the Elks Temple, and have served as a fire escape for the building. Since McMenamins began operating in the building, the stairs have housed a cafe and patio.

According to the Daily Journal of Commerce, "The staircase is an important east-west pedestrian connection within the north end of Tacoma's downtown. The Spanish Steps serve as an access point to transportation facilities, including those for Pierce Transit and LINK light rail, which connects with the Sounder commuter rail line."

The stairs were restored in 2011. Fodor's has called the Spanish Steps "famous".
