= Reah Whitehead =

American lawyer

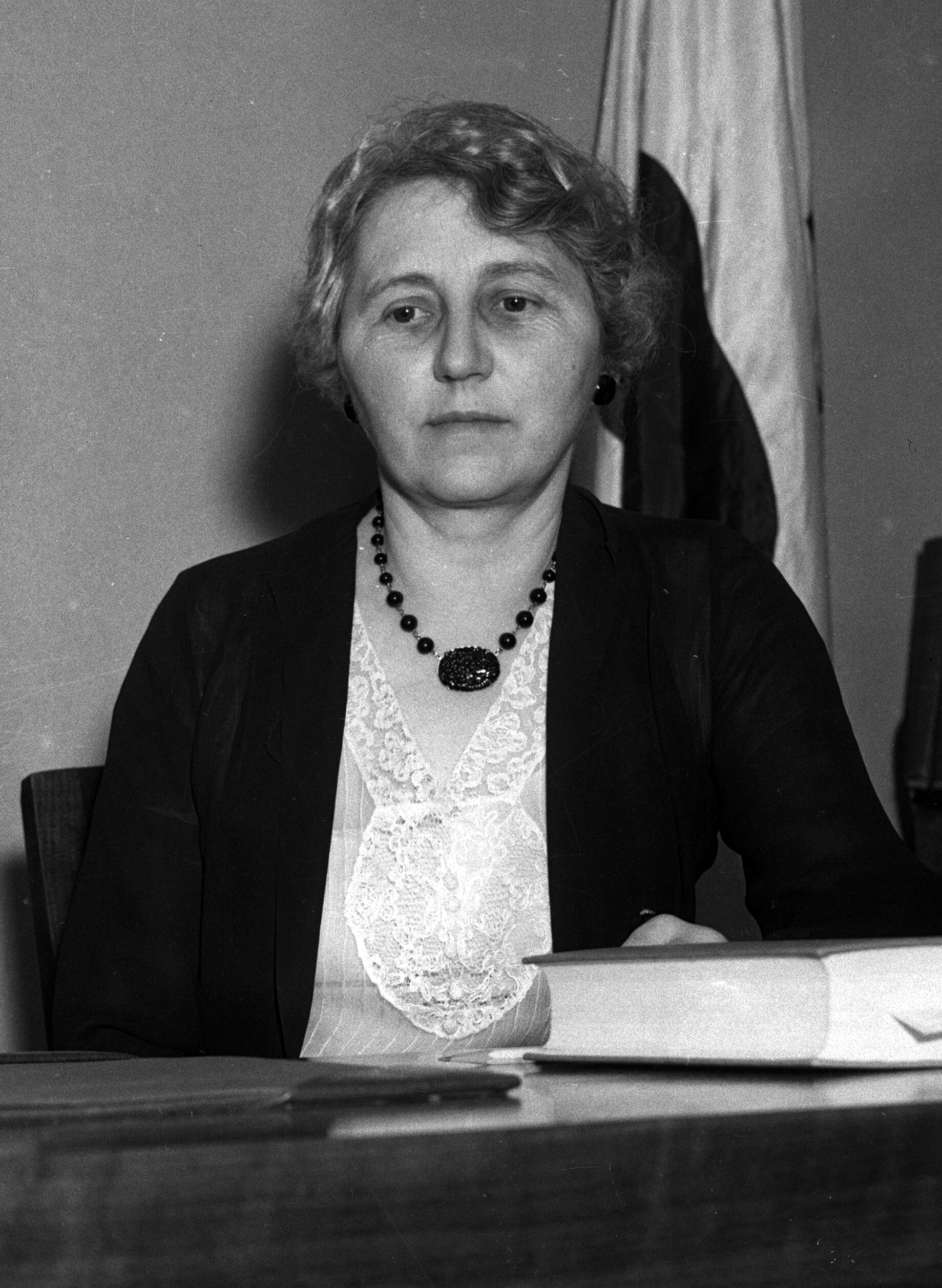
- Whitehead, circa 1924
- Born: 11 April 1883; Kansas City
- Died: 13 October 1972 (aged 89)
- Occupation: Lawyer, justice of the peace

Reah Mary Whitehead (April 11, 1883 – October 13, 1972) was one of the first female lawyers in Washington state and the first female Justice of the Peace in King County and Washington state.

== Early life ==
Reah Mary Whitehead was born on April 11, 1883, in Kansas City, Missouri, the daughter of Stanley E. Whitehead and Esther Gideon.

She attended the University of Washington School of Law. She graduated and passed the Washington State Bar examination in 1905.

== Career ==
Reah Whitehead began her legal career as a stenographer. In 1899, at 16 years old, she worked in a law office in Skagway, Alaska: she was the youngest court reporter in Alaska. After graduation and passing the bar examination, she worked for Judge Thomas Burke. She then moved to the position of chief clerk in the King County Prosecutor's Office with Chief Prosecutor MacKintosh.

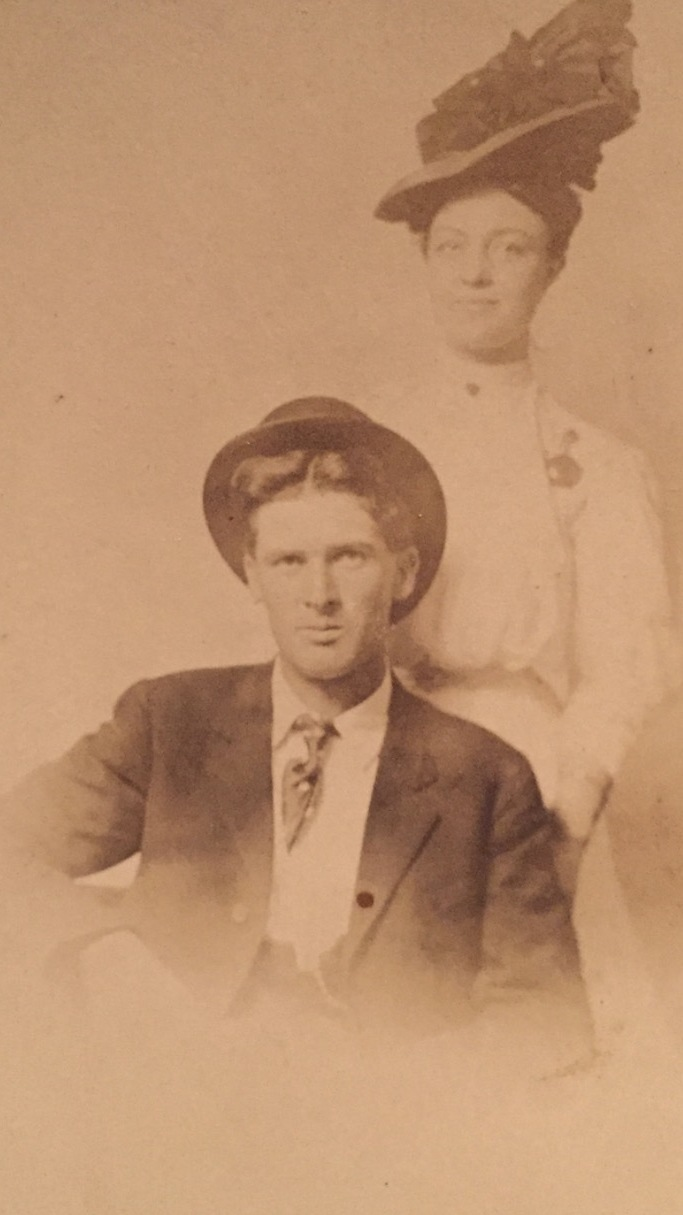
Reah Whitehead, 1904

In 1909 she was named Deputy Prosecuting Attorney by Chief Prosecutor George Vanderveer, the first woman prosecutor in the King County and the State of Washington. In 1914 she was elected Justice of the Peace, the first female Justice of the Peace in King County and Washington state. Her mother, Esther T. Bosley, ran her campaign. She served in the role King County's only female Justice of the Peace until 1941 for seven terms.

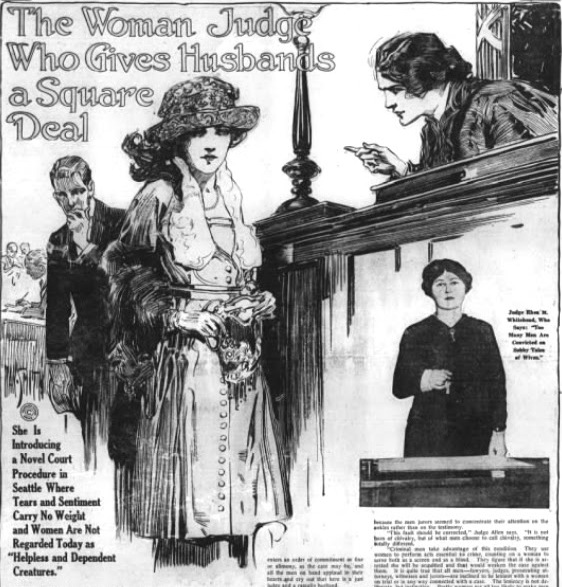
The Fort Wayne Journal Gazette, Indiana, June 26, 1921

She prepared the Drafts of Bills for and assisted in procuring passage of laws for Women's State Reformatory and Filiation Proceedings. Her mother, Esther Bosley, was the driving force for the funding of the Women's Industrial Home and Clinic in Medical Lake, Washington; her daughter drafted the bill for the measure aimed to grant funding from state social welfare agencies, which passed.

She was on the Board of Travelers Aid.

She was honorary member of the American Woman's Association. In 1926 she was selected to represent Washington State at the American Women's Association convention in New York City.

She was a member of League of Women Voters, Women's University Club of Seattle, Women's City Club, Seattle Business and Professional Women's Club, State and National Bar Associations, Legislative Council of Washington, Women's Pioneer Auxiliary, Woman's Christian Temperance Union, Board of Washington Society of Mental Hygiene, Phi Delta (legal sorority).

In 1936 she strongly opposed the reinstatement of public whipping as a means to punishing criminals, according to her a society's failure.

== Personal life ==
Reah Whitehead moved to Seattle, Washington, in 1890 with her family.

In 1931, at 48 years old, Reah Whitehead married Frank Sidney Harrison, a retired grocery man. They later divorced and Harrison died in 1955.

After her marriage she lived in an old rectory, restored as manor. She spent the summers in a cabin on Lake Sammamish, commuting daily to Seattle.

Whitehead retired in 1941 and was replaced by Evangeline Starr. She died on October 13, 1972, at 89 years old.

== See also ==
- List of first women lawyers and judges in Washington
