= Arctic Building =

- U.S. National Register of Historic Places
- Seattle Landmark
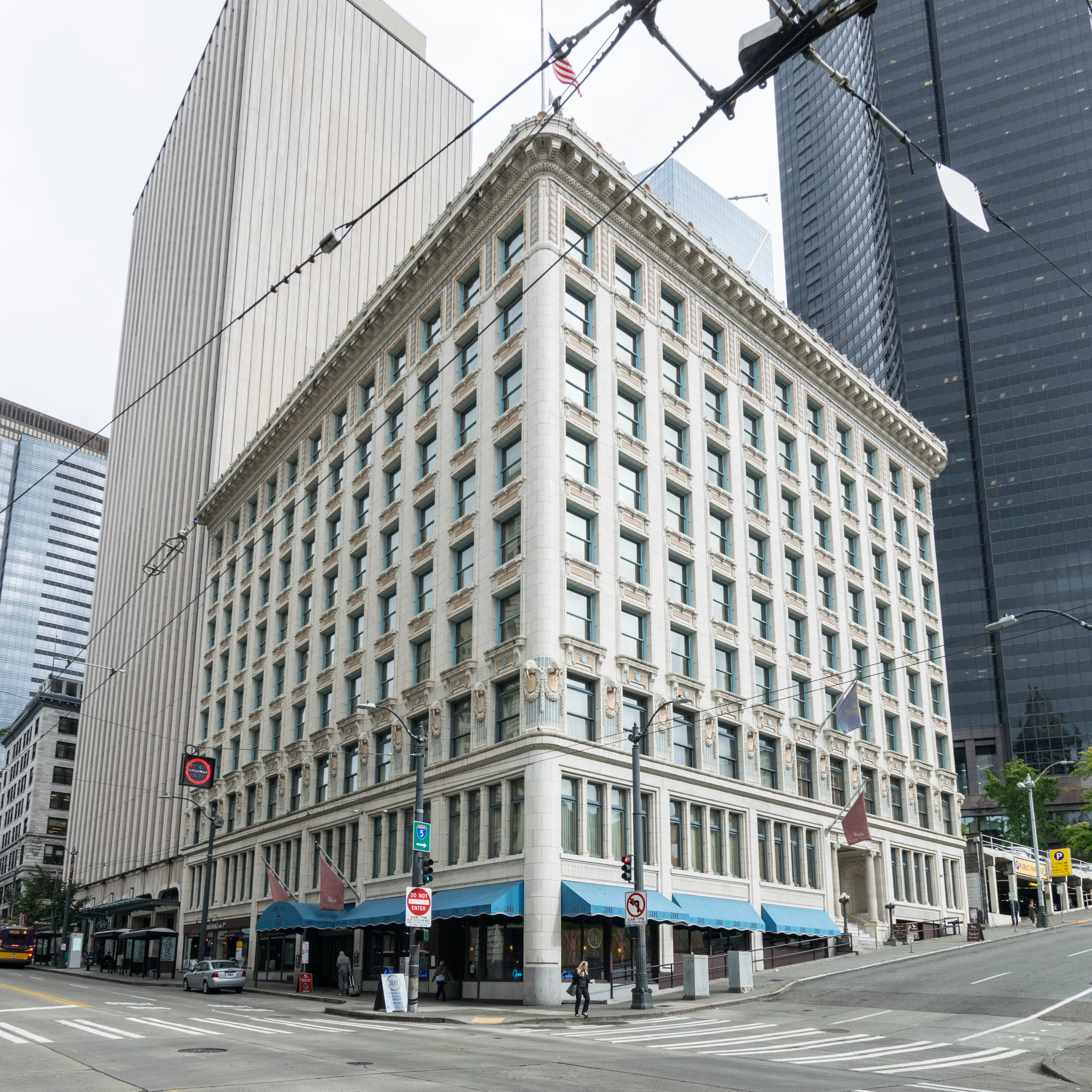

- Location within Downtown Seattle
- Location: Seattle, Washington
- Coordinates: 47°36′13.380634″N 122°19′55.001405″W
- Area: less than one acre
- Built: 1914
- Architect: A. Warren Gould
- Architectural style: Beaux-Arts
- NRHP reference No.: 78002749

Significant dates
- Added to NRHP: November 28, 1978
- Designated SEATL: December 13, 1993

The Arctic Club Building is a ten-story hotel in Seattle, Washington located at the Northeast corner of Third Avenue and Cherry Street. Built in 1914 for the Arctic Club, a social group established by wealthy individuals who experienced Alaska's gold rush (Klondike Gold Rush), it was occupied by them from construction until the club's dissolution in 1971. It is entirely faced with cream white terra cotta with submarine blue and orange-brown accents. The building is recognizable by the terra cotta walrus head sculptures lining the third floor of the building and its iconic polar bear in the Polar Bar, the hotel's bar and cocktail lounge. It is one of the finest examples of multi-colored matte glaze terra cotta work in the city. In 2008, the building was restored and adapted for use as a luxury hotel, the Arctic Club Hotel. A rooftop garden used by the social club was replaced with a penthouse office suite.

It was designed by architect A. Warren Gould. In 1978 it was listed on the National Register of Historic Places.

== History ==
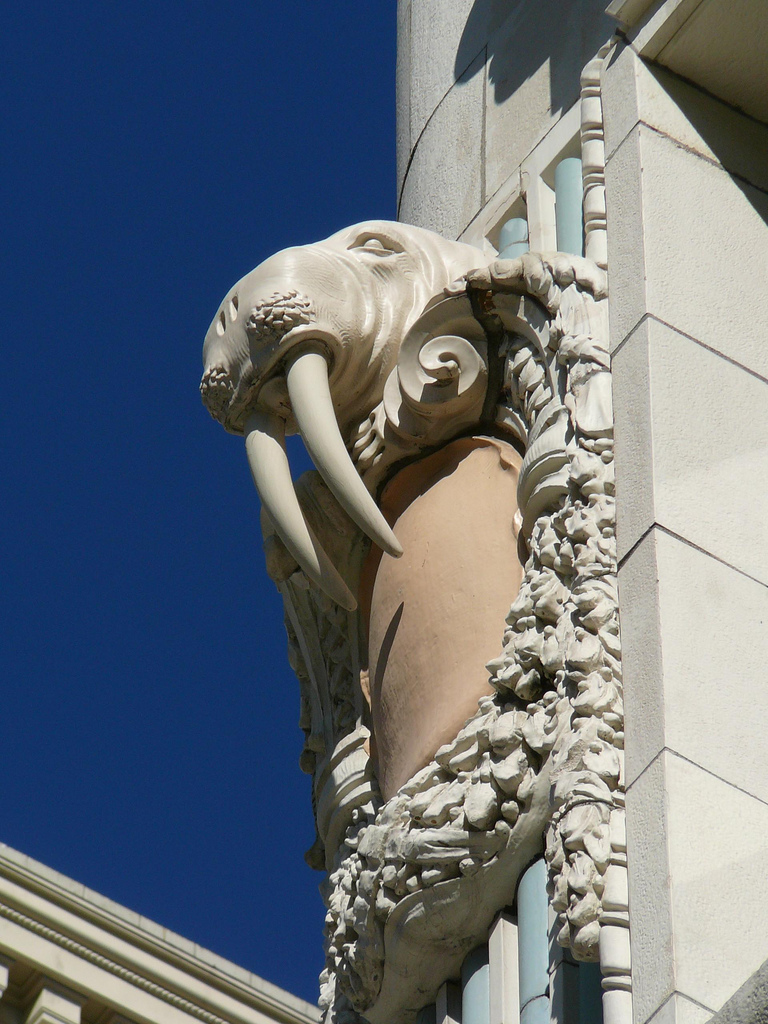
One of the terra cotta walrus sculptures adorning the face of the Arctic Club building

The site of the Arctic building was originally owned by Joseph R. Lewis, the Chief Justice of Washington Territory and a direct descendant of George Washington's sister Elizabeth "Betty" Lewis. The home he built on the site in 1875 was considered one of the finest in Seattle at the time. The house was replaced in 1892 by the three-story, brick Seattle Theatre, designed by the firm of Saunders and Lawton. The newly formed Rainier Club occupied the office portion of the building until it and the theater were replaced by the Arctic Club Building in 1916.

An original mosaic of club name and club symbol at the entrance stair to the main lobby (in 2020).

The Arctic Club was formed in 1908 by successful veterans of the Klondike Gold Rush. The existing Alaska Club was merged that year into the Arctic Club. In Seattle, it was a fraternal men's club for businessmen with Gold Rush or Alaska connections. Another Arctic Club was established in New York City, with membership based on exploration of wilderness areas in the Arctic. The Arctic Club in Seattle was initially located in 1909 on 3rd Avenue and Jefferson Street in the Morrison Hotel, also known as the Arctic Club Building.

In 1914, after a dispute with the owner of that building, the Arctic Construction Company, the club board decided to relocate. In 1916, the members commissioned noted Seattle architect A. Warren Gould to design the Arctic Building in downtown Seattle at Third and Cherry as the group's headquarters. James Moses was the builder. During the move, members surreptitiously removed the bar from the original location by hoisting it out one of the windows. The 128 ft. Arctic Club building is in the Beaux-Arts style; it is known for its terra cotta walrus head sculptures, indicative of the club's name, which adorn the third floor façade. The terra cotta was sourced from nearby manufacturer Denny-Renton Clay and Coal Company, which provided terra cotta for many local buildings of the same period.

U.S. Congressman Marion Zioncheck committed suicide on August 7, 1936, by jumping from the window of his campaign office on the Arctic Building's fifth floor. His body struck the pavement directly in front of a car occupied by his wife.

The building was owned for a time by the City of Seattle and was sold to a Spokane company, which redeveloped the property as a hotel, opening in 2008.
