= Northern Pacific Office Building =

- U.S. National Register of Historic Places
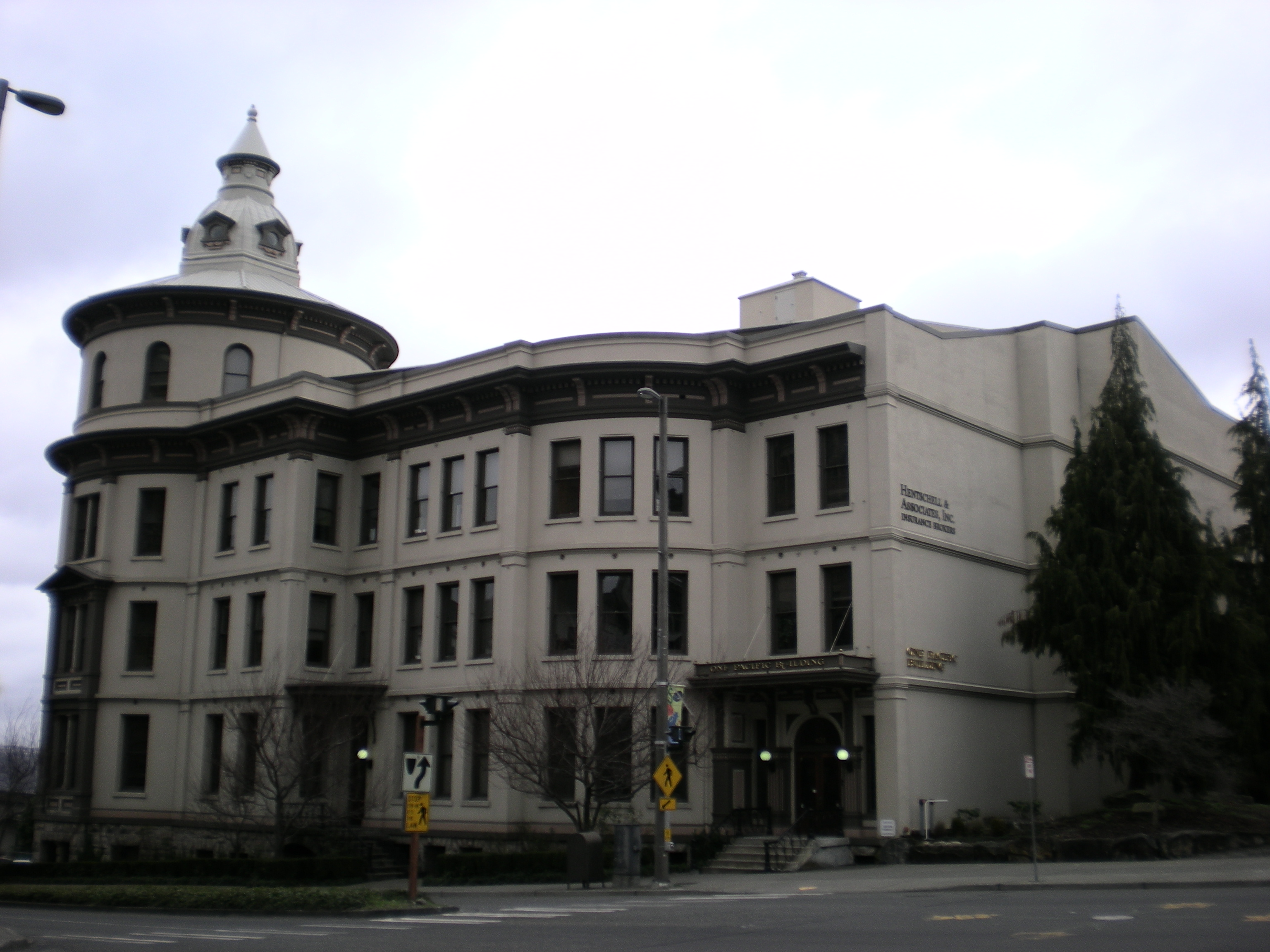
- Northern Pacific Office Building

- Location within Washington (state)
- Location: NE corner of 7th St. and Pacific Ave., Tacoma, Washington
- Coordinates: 47°15′27″N 122°26′17″W
- Area: less than one acre
- Built: 1891
- Architect: Charles B. Talbot
- Architectural style: Second Empire
- NRHP reference No.: 76001901
- Added to NRHP: May 4, 1976

The Northern Pacific Office Building is a three-story historic office building in Tacoma, Washington that served as the headquarters of the Northern Pacific Railway's Tacoma division. Built in 1888, the brick, stucco, stone and cast iron structure stands on a high bluff overlooking the Commencement Bay harbor and extensive railroad switching yards that fan out across the tide flats below at the mouth of the Puyallup River where it flows into Puget Sound. The flats are densely developed with heavy industry that has grown up around the railroad facilities and the Port of Tacoma. The site was originally a choice location across from the Tacoma City Hall (extant and listed in the National Register) and at the north end of Pacific Avenue, the main street through the city's central business district.

The building is in Victorian Era Second Empire design, in typical grandiosity and formality. Triangular in plan to fit the street plan and the bluff. There is a four-story circular tower on the north, which widens in a series of curves and re-entrant angles to become a conventional four-story rectangular plan. The rectangular section was demolished in 1975. The remaining structure is three stories in height. A bracketed entablature continued around the tower, separating the three lower stories from the top floor and the lantern above.

The foundation is ashlar stone to the first floor. There is a substantial water table with brick walls, covered by stucco. A narrow belt course divides the second and third floors from the one below. The belt rests on the capitals of pilasters that divide the wall into a series of panels.

The frieze atop the third floor continues from the tower section to the four-story rectangular section. The rectangular section was demolished in 1974. The cornice, an elaborate belt course did not carry over from the tower section. The strip pilasters have a broad pediment on the second floor level. A cornice at the top of the tower conceals a gable roof. The four-story, rectangular section had a flat roof. The tower is topped with a low conical mansard roof and lantern. There are two street level entrances. A formal entrance has a suspended canopy with double doors and a transom arch on pilasters. A second entrance is further down the street.

In the late 1920s, while the building was serving as an annex to city hall, the four-story section at the south end of the building was demolished and rebuilt to serve as Tacoma's city jail. It was demolished in 1974 to widen Pacific Avenue. A blank brick and concrete wall remains with some of the roof structure exposed.

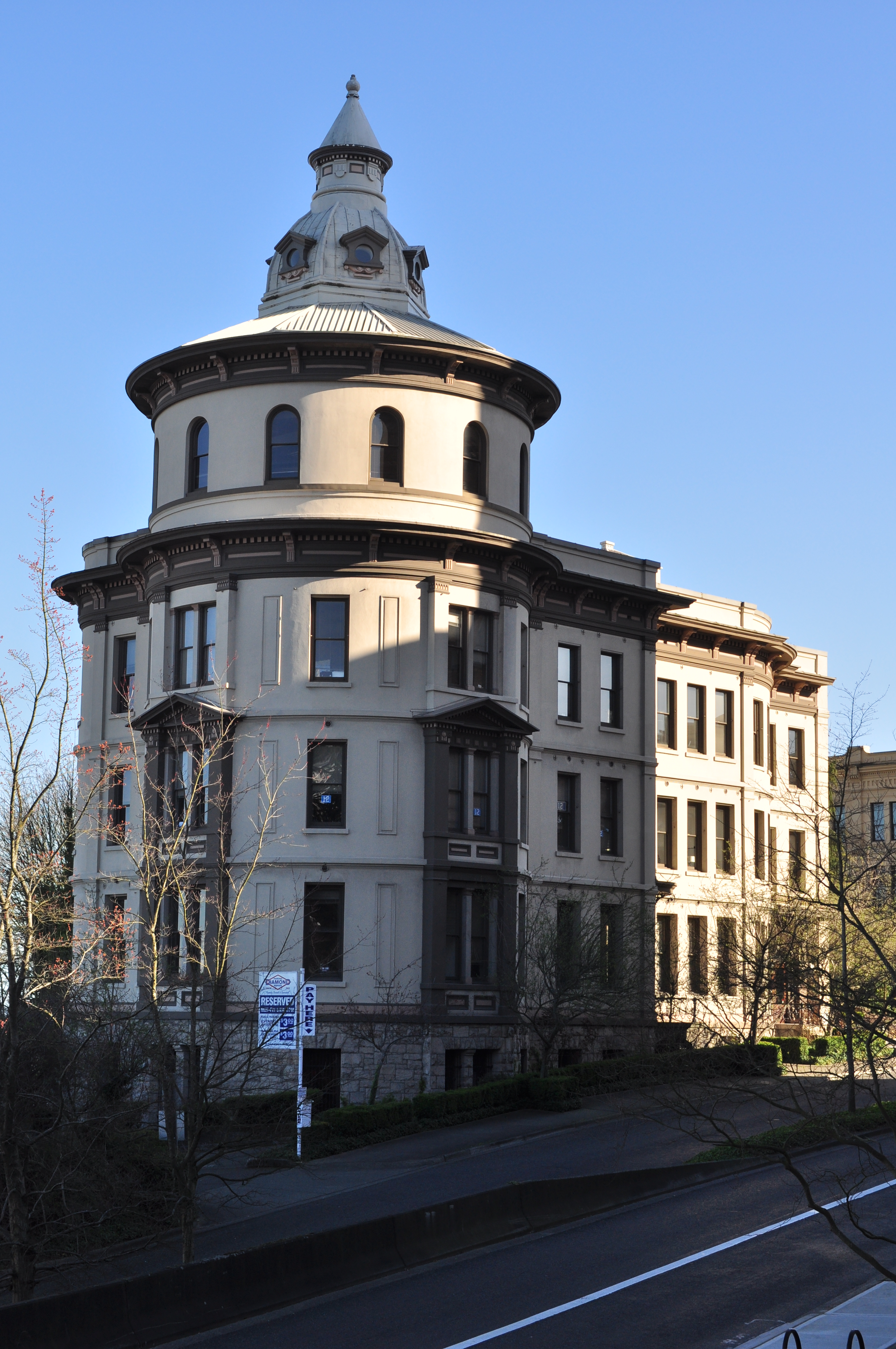
The Northern Pacific Office Building in Tacoma, Washington. On the National Register of Historic Places both in its own right and as part of the Old City Hall Historic District.

== Interior ==
The building contained 53 offices and storerooms and 19 fireproof vaults. General management of the Northern Pacific had offices on the first and second floor. These included; the assistant general manager, assistant superintendent of transportation, Northern Pacific Coal Company, Tacoma Land Company, the Legal Department, road master, superintendent of bridges, Northern Pacific Express Company and the city ticket and freight offices. The third floor was used by the engineering department and a telegraph room. An employees cafeteria occupied the fourth floor in the tower.

== Bibliography ==
- Mason, Alien C. Tacoma and Vicinity, Nuhn and Wheeler Publishers, Tacoma, 1889,
- Smalley, Eugene V. History of the Northern Pacific Railroad, New York, 1883.
- Villard, Henry. The Early History of Transportation in Oregon, edited by 0. G. Villard, 1944. Tacoma Chamber of Commerce, Tacoma Illustrated, Chicago, 1889.
- Jay Cooke and Company, The Northern Pacific Railroad Its Route, Resources, Progress and Business. Publishing date uncertain, 1863-1873.
- Tacoma Daily Ledger, September 5–8, 1889.
