= Francis Arthur Sutton =

English adventure (1884-1944)

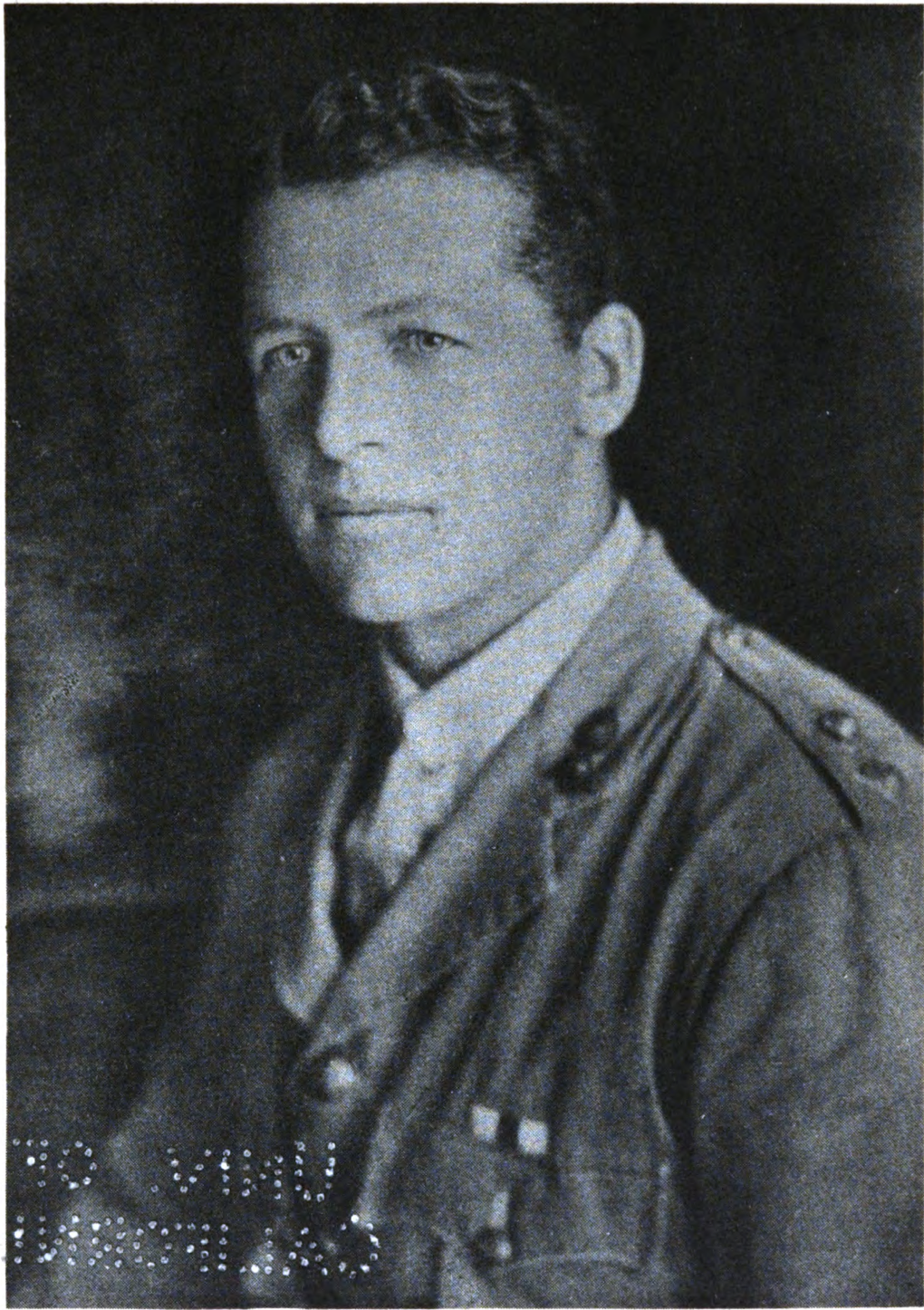
- Sutton c. 1914
- Born: August 19, 1894; North Lincolnshire, UK
- Died: May 4, 1944 (aged 49); Japanese-occupied Hong Kong
- Cause of death: Dysentery
- Burial place: Stanley Military Cemetery
- Other name: Frank A. Sutton
- Military career
- Allegiance: United Kingdom
- Rank: Second lieutenant
- Nickname: One Arm Sutton
- Unit: Royal Engineers
- Conflicts: World War I; Gallipoli campaign; Warlord Era
- Awards: Military Cross

Major General Francis Arthur Sutton M.C. (born England 14 February 1884, died Hong Kong 22 October 1944) was an English adventurer known as "One Arm Sutton." A nickname he gained after losing part of his arm from an exploding hand grenade at the Battle of Gallipoli. For which he was awarded the Military Cross.

A product of Eton College, Sutton studied two years of engineering at University of London before working in civil engineering in Argentina, Mexico, and the US after 1906.

Sutton held a commission in the Royal Engineers during World War I. Following the war he built railways in Mexico and Argentina and also mined for gold in Siberia and Korea.

Sutton travelled to China where he had purchased manufacturing rights for the Stokes Mortar that he provided to various warlords. He became a major general for the Chinese warlord Zhang Zuolin. In Mukden, Sutton provided hospitality to Aloha Baker on her round-the-world drive as her party passed through a war zone.

In 1941, he was apprehended by the Japanese while in Korea and interned in Hong Kong during the Pacific War. He would die of dysentery in 1944.
