= A. Warren Gould =

Canadian architect (1871–1922)

Augustus Warren Gould
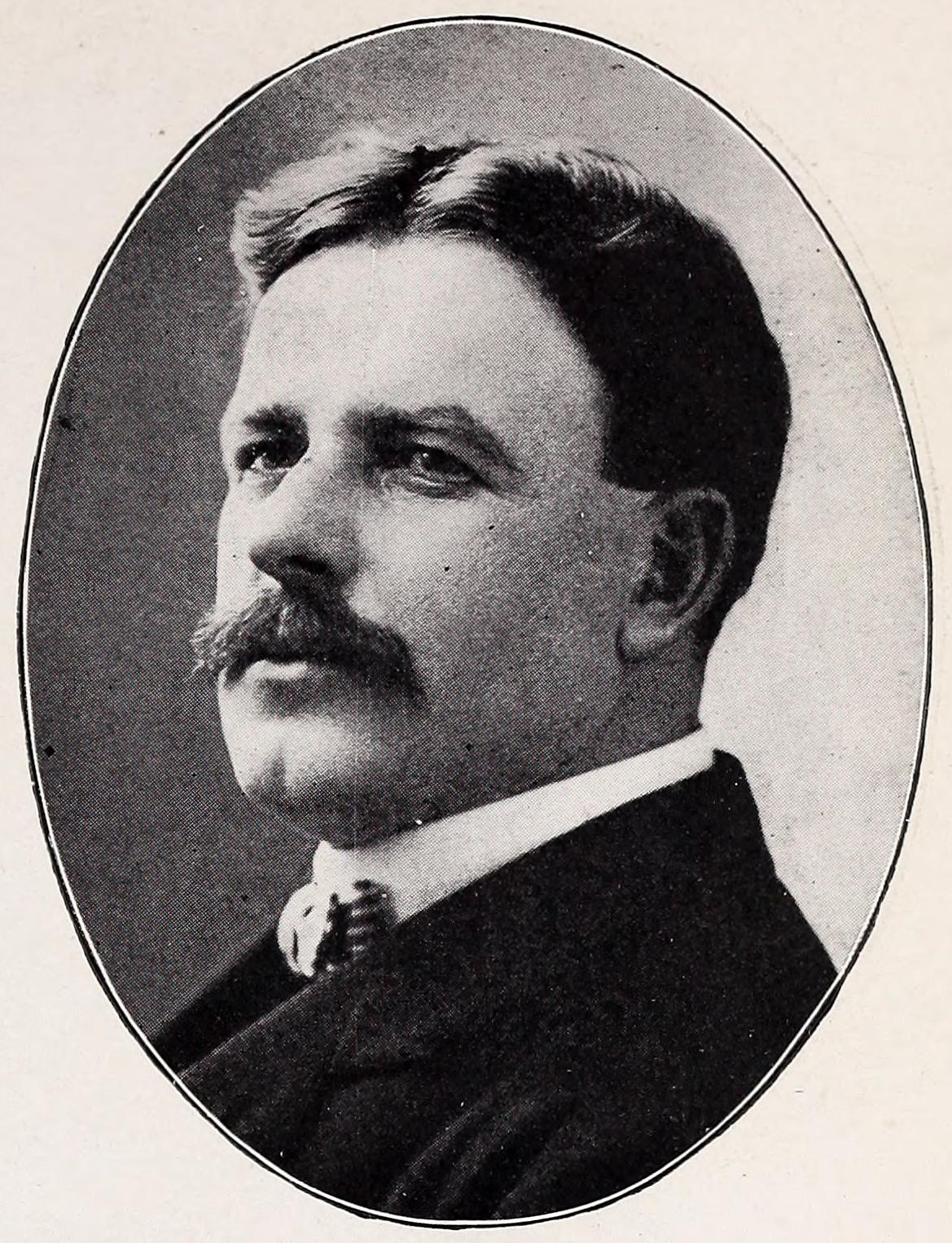
- Born: January 15, 1871; Amherst, Nova Scotia, Canada
- Died: October 15, 1922 (aged 51); Tacoma, Washington, U.S.
- Education: Massachusetts Institute of Technology
- Occupation: Architect

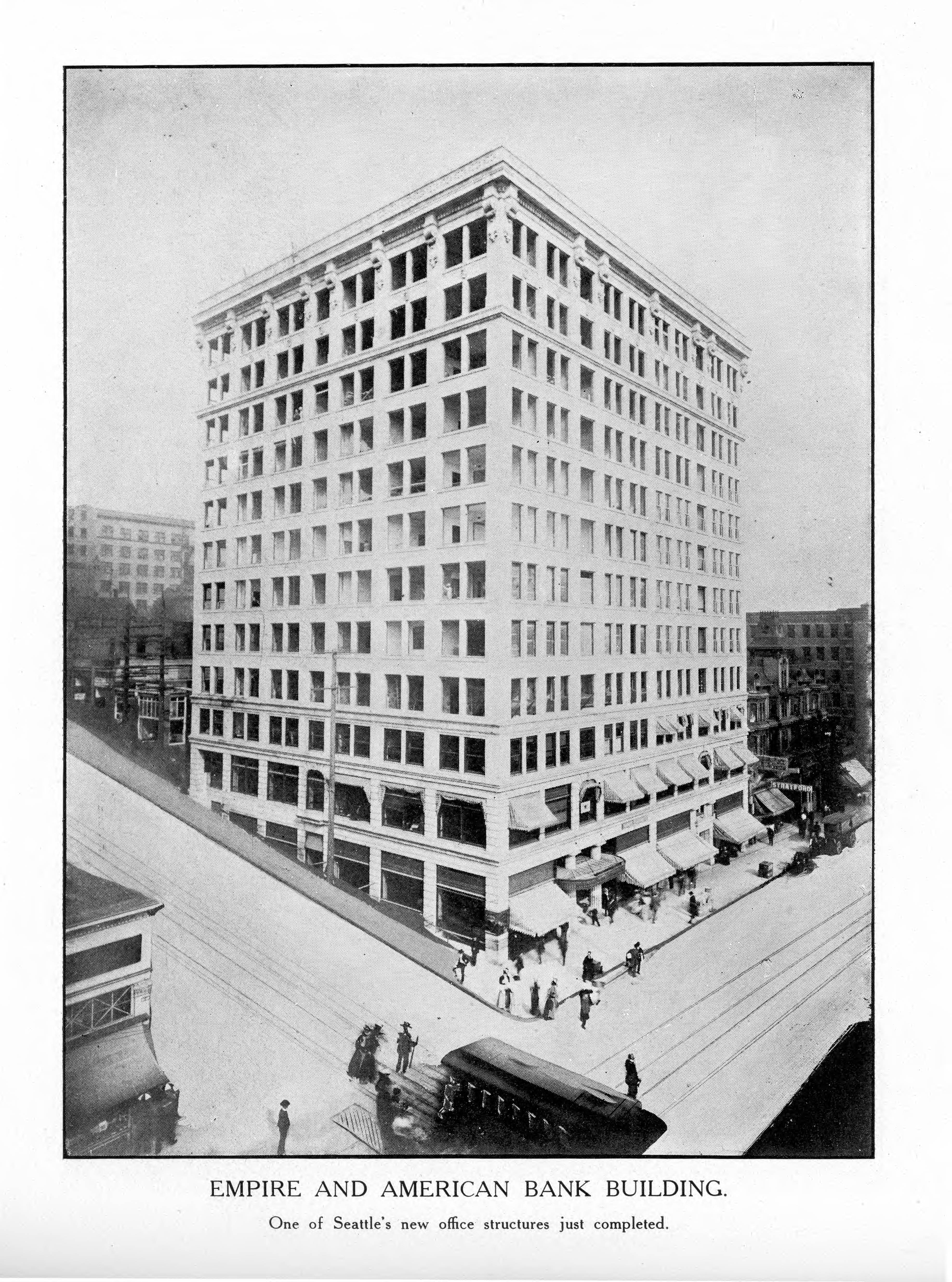
Empire and American Bank building

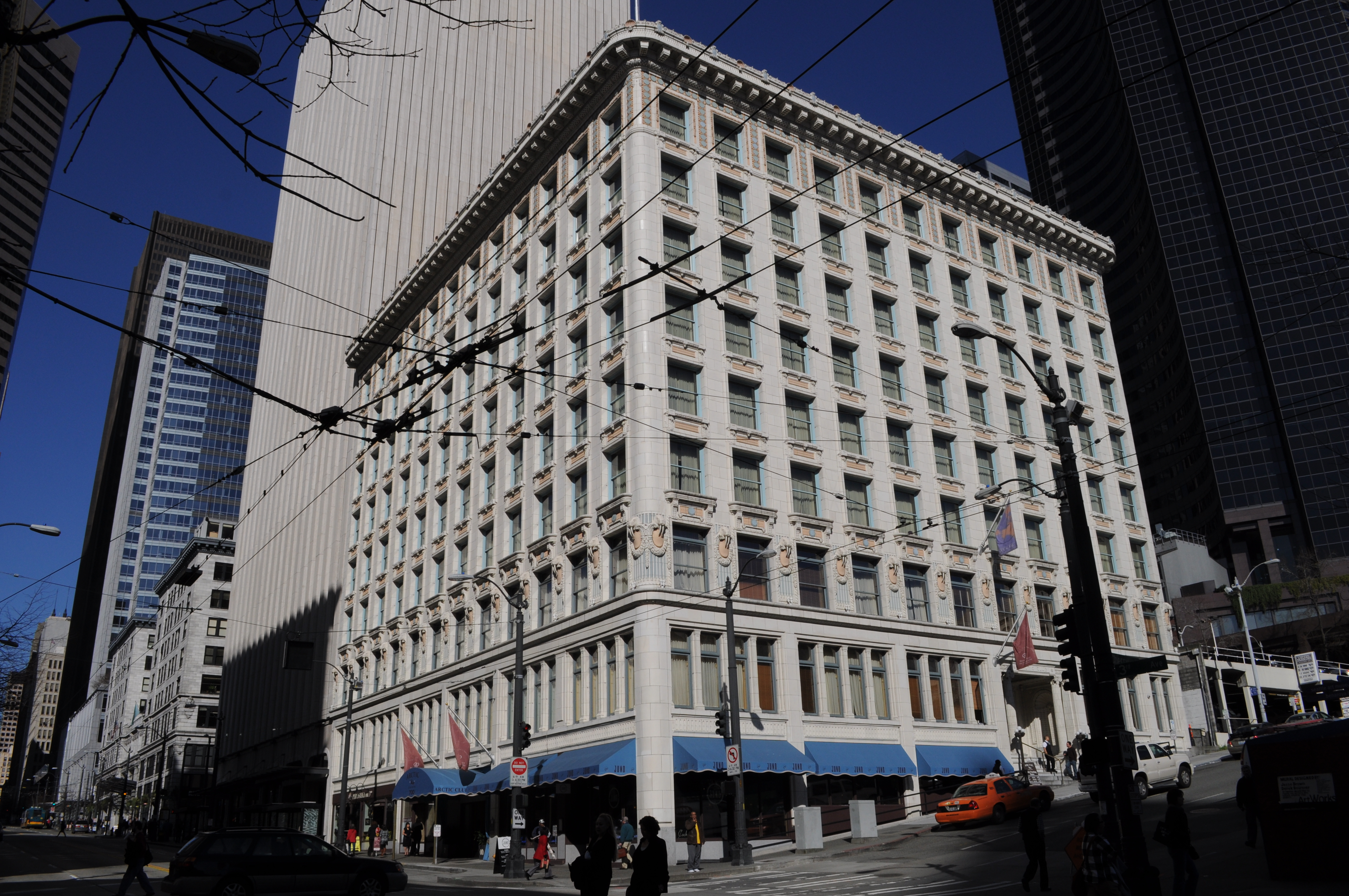
Arctic Building in Seattle

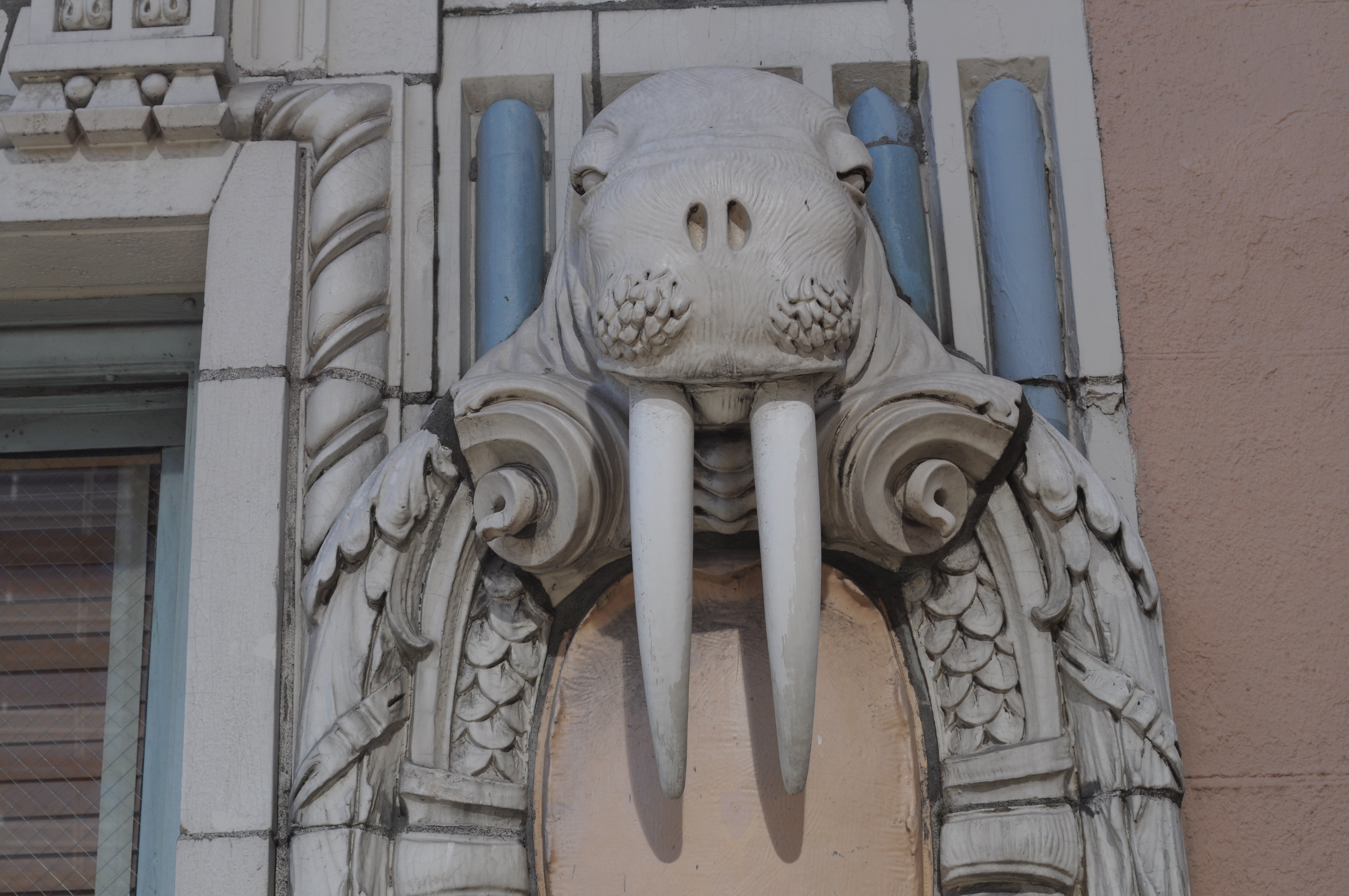
One of the terra cotta walruses adorning the Arctic Building. There was also a polar bear

Augustus Warren Gould (January 15, 1871 – October 15, 1922) was an architect in Boston and Seattle, as well as surrounding areas of the Pacific Northwest including Canada. Gould was born in Nova Scotia, in Canada. He moved from Boston to Seattle by 1905. His firm's work in downtown Seattle included the American Savings Bank and Empire buildings (1906) which were the second and third concrete reinforced structures in the United States ever built. He also designed the King County Courthouse in downtown Seattle. Gould was not formally trained as an architect. His background was in building and contracting.

== Early life ==
Gould was born January 15, 1871, in Amherst, Nova Scotia. He took classes at Massachusetts Institute of Technology.

== Career ==
Gould worked in the Boston area before coming to Seattle. He designed several commercial buildings in downtown Seattle including the County-City Building, American Savings Bank and adjoining Empire Building (2nd Avenue and Madison), and the Standard Furniture Company building on 2nd and Pine. He was involved in supervising the construction of the YWCA building in Seattle in partnership with Edouard Frere Champney. Their partnership lasted from 1909 until 1912. He also designed buildings for Vancouver, British Columbia and in the cities of Aberdeen and Tacoma in Washington state as well as residences across the Northwest. He also originated the municipal plans amendment to the city charter and was responsible for the creation of the Municipal Plans Commission. He was elected the president of the Washington State Society of Architects in 1917 and was appointed a member of the state architects' examining board in 1919.

There was controversy over his winning bid for the King County Courthouse.

He was a member of the American Institute of Architects (AIA) Washington Chapter and was a charter member of the Washington State Society of Architects. He was appointed by Governor Louis F. Hart to the Washington State Examining Board of Architects.

== Work ==
- Empire building and adjacent American Savings Bank building (demolished by 1983)
- Arctic Club Building (1916), now the DoubleTree Arctic Club Hotel
- Pioneer Square Hotel (1917)
- Broadacres Building (1907), sold for $25 million in 2016 with plans being developed for a building cantilevered over it.
- Seller Building (1906)
