= Old City Hall (Tacoma, Washington) =

- U.S. National Register of Historic Places
- U.S. Historic district – Contributing property
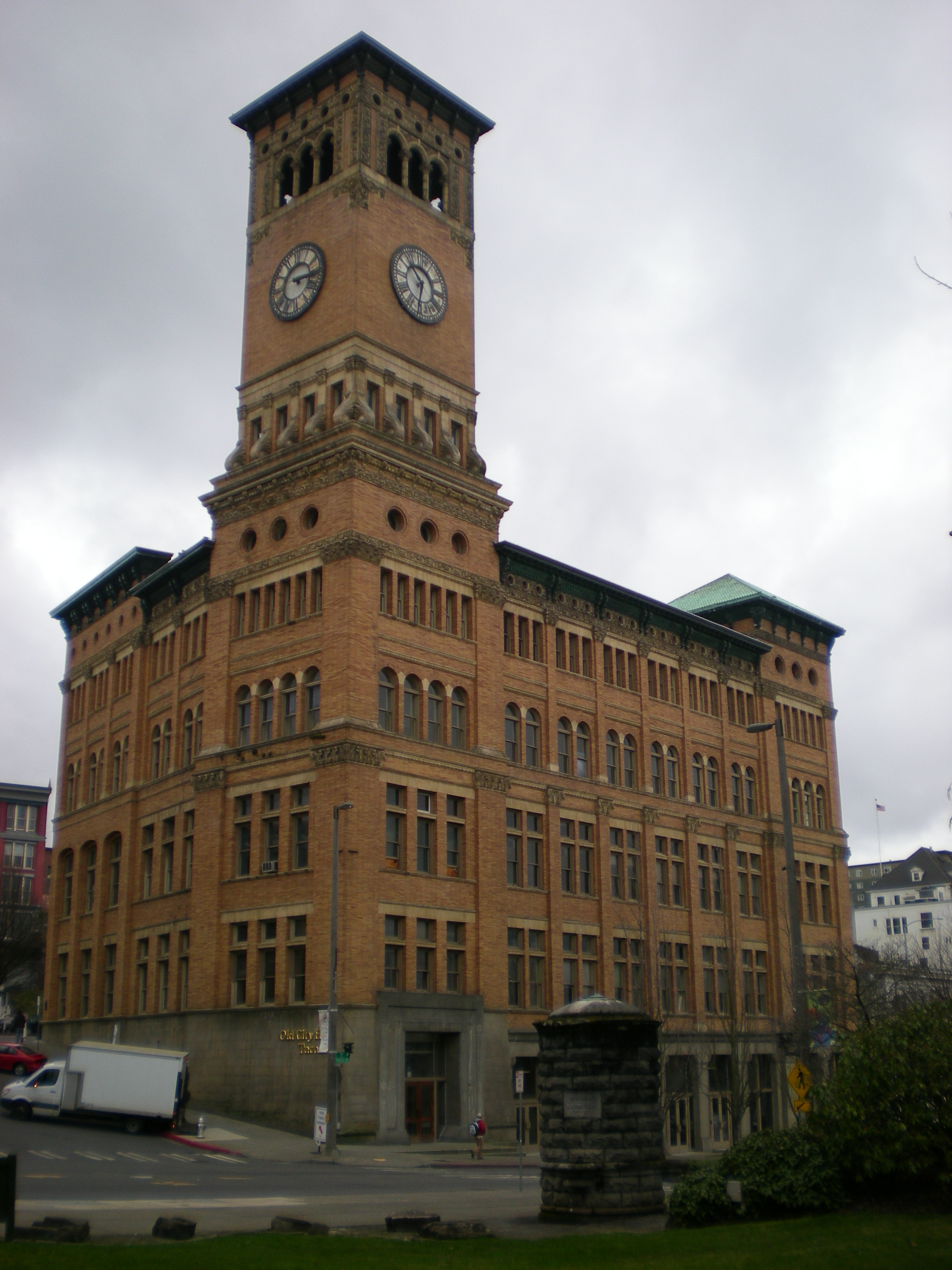
- Old City Hall in Tacoma, Washington

- Location within Washington (state)
- Interactive map showing the location of Tacoma Old City Hall
- Location: 7th Ave. between Commerce and Pacific Ave., Tacoma, Washington
- Coordinates: 47°15′27″N 122°26′19″W
- Area: less than one acre
- Built: 1893
- Architect: Hatherton & McIntosh
- Architectural style: Italian Villa
- Part of: Old City Hall Historic District (ID77001352)
- NRHP reference No.: 74001973

Significant dates
- Added to NRHP: May 17, 1974
- Designated CP: December 23, 1977

The Old City Hall is a five-story building in Tacoma, Washington that served as the city hall in the early 20th century. The building features a ten-story clocktower on the southeast corner, facing the intersection of Pacific Avenue and S 7th Street.

The building uses masonry bearing walls combined with numerous windows. The windows on the second and third floors are of equal size. The fourth story windows are arched at the top. The fifth story windows are smaller and narrower.

The foundation is a local Wilkeson stone, which is light gray. The walls are eight feet thick at the base and taper to six feet at street level. They are covered with a façade of red brick faced with yellow Roman brick. These bricks are believed to have been ballast from China or Belgium or to have been imported from Italy. The tower is a freestanding masonry with a clock on each face.

The building is a trapezoid in plan and reflects the Italian Villa style. Small round windows appear below the corner line; three large round windows occur below the corner on the tower.

The tower's base has heavy brackets above the corner of the main structure and narrow rectangular windows on the tower body. A group of three arched windows are at the top on each side. A row of small round windows circles the tower between the arched windows and the eave line. Terra cotta decorations embellish the tower and areas of the entablature. The tower has a clock and a set of four bells. The clock and the bells were cast by the McShane Bell Foundry in Baltimore, the same company that cast the Liberty Bell. The bells is 8,000 pounds (3,600 kg) of silver bell metal. Hugh Campbell Wallace of Tacoma, who would later become the United States ambassador to France, gave the bells and chimes in memory of his daughter on Christmas Day, 1904. The bells were removed during the 2023 restoration due to being a seismic hazard and conflicting with current building codes. The pendulum of the clock, 12 feet (3.7 m) in length, is suspended on a single wire, 40 feet (12 m) in length. The mechanism is gravity run and the motors are wound electrically.

== History ==
Tacoma was a railroad town, acting as the western terminus of the Northern Pacific Railroad. Attracted by the potential of financial success, businessmen from the Midwest came to the city. They brought with them a culture and the Old City Hall is an example of those tastes. The old Tacoma City Hall was completed April 23, 1893 at a cost of $257,965 and was used by the city until 1957. The structure is representative of the ebullience of spirit that characterized the city of Tacoma in the late 19th century; it "...seems to combine a romantic feeling for the spirit of fifteenth century Florence with the mercantile spirit of nineteenth century America."

== Edward Hatherton ==
The building was designed by the San Francisco firm, Hatherton and Mclntosh. Edward Hatherton had established a private architecture practice in San Francisco in the 1870s, and was hired in 1877 as a draftsman and assistant to prominent architect August Laver in 1877. Laver, an English architect who moved San Francisco from Canada 1871 when he won a design competition for San Francisco's new City Hall, resigned soon thereafter due to health complications and problems with the City Hall construction project, and Hatherton assumed Laver's role on the project. Hatherton established his own practice with John Cotter Pelton in 1879, before assuming the position of City Architect of San Francisco in 1888.

Hatherton resigned his position in 1891 to relocate to Tacoma, WA. That same year, Hatherton formed a new firm in Tacoma with Australian-born architect Colin McIntosh, and together they designed numerous commercial and residential buildings in Tacoma, including the new City Hall Building and the Chamber of Commerce Building (1892).

On March 1, 1896, Hatherton was reported missing from his home in San Francisco. He had last been seen at his office the day before, on February 29. On March 20, newspapers reported that it was suspected that Hatherton, despondent over the financial losses incurred in Tacoma during the recent financial panic, had committed suicide. A week later those suspicions were confirmed.

== Redevelopment ==
In March 2019, after three rounds of competitive bidding, the Tacoma City Council announced that it had awarded Surge Tacoma the right to purchase and redevelop Old City Hall. The purchase price was $2 million plus $2 million in kind donations over the next 10 years. Surge Tacoma has a budget of $15 million for the project, which will include 40 micro apartments, two restaurants, retail space on the first two levels, a basement "speakeasy" in the old jail, and office and co-working space. They have also launched a national competition for the restoration of the clock tower. They plan on opening for business on New Year's Eve 2021 by "ringing in the new year" on the old clock tower.

== See also ==
- Rialto Theater
- Pantages Theatre/Jones Building
- National Register of Historic Places listings in Pierce County, Washington

== Bibliography ==
- Tacoma Daily Ledger, October 26,
- Hunt, Herbert, Tacoma, Its History L891, April 1, 1931. f and Its Builders. Chicago, 1916. Volume 2, pp. 167–170.
- Tacoma Weekly News, May 25, 1917.
- Polk's City Directory, 1890, 1891, 1892, 1893, 1894, 1895
- Sias, Patricia, An Examination of Influences on Selected Tacoma Architecture 1890–1914, M.A. Thes:
- Tacoma News Tribune, January 25, Ls, University of Puget Sound, 1971. L967.
