= American Savings Bank =

Hawaiian bank

American Savings Bank, F.S.B.
- Company type: Subsidiary
- Industry: Financial services
- Founded: 1925; 101 years ago
- Headquarters: Honolulu, Hawaii, United States
- Area served: Hawaii, Worldwide
- Key people: Ann Teranishi (President & CEO)
- Products: Banking services
- Number of employees: 1,000 (2022)
- Parent: pre-2024 Hawaiian Electric Industries
- Website: www.asbhawaii.com

American Savings Bank, N.A. (ASB) is headquartered in Honolulu, Hawaii and one of Hawaii’s largest financial institutions. The company is headquartered at 300 North Beretania Street, right outside of Honolulu’s Chinatown and the downtown financial district.

== History ==
American Savings Bank dates back to September 7, 1922, when four men filed articles of incorporation in the state of Utah for mutual savings and loans. The following year, on April 24, another association filed articles of incorporation under the name of American Building and Loan Company. Permission to establish its first branch in Honolulu, HI, was granted on January 8, 1925.

On February 4, 1932, Mutual Savings and Loan merged with American Building and Loan to become American Mutual Savings and Loan. Ten years later, the corporate name was changed to American Savings and Loan Association.

By 1958, American Savings and Loan had five offices. In the 1960s it added four branches on Oahu. The 1971 acquisition of Kauai Savings and Loan added four branches. Three years later, in 1974, American Savings and Loan merged with Maui Savings & Loan. American Savings and Loan now had branches on five islands. When American Savings and Loan acquired the Pacific Savings and Loan Association of Hawaii in 1977, it added another six locations on Oahu. In 1978, American Savings and Loan marked a milestone when it achieved $1 billion in assets.

On January 23, 1987, American Savings and Loan Association announced the formation of a separate subsidiary to conduct its operations. The subsidiary, called American Savings Bank, was a federally chartered savings bank with its home office in Honolulu, Hawaii.

On May 26, 1988, Hawaiian Electric Industries (HEI), parent company of Hawaiian Electric Company, acquired American Savings Bank from Salt Lake City-based American Savings and Loan Association. In 1990, American Savings Bank acquired First Nationwide Savings Bank's Hawaiian branches and their deposits. On December 6, 1997, American Savings Bank acquired the assets of Bank of America Hawaii Division, increasing their branch total at that time to 68 and their assets to $5.5 billion.

In December 2024, in the aftermath of the Maui fires, HEI sold a 90.1% stake in the bank to a consortium of private investors.

Effective January 1, 2026, ASB converted from federal savings bank to a national bank, also known as a national association under federal banking law.
