= Édouard Frère Champney =

American architect (1874–1929)

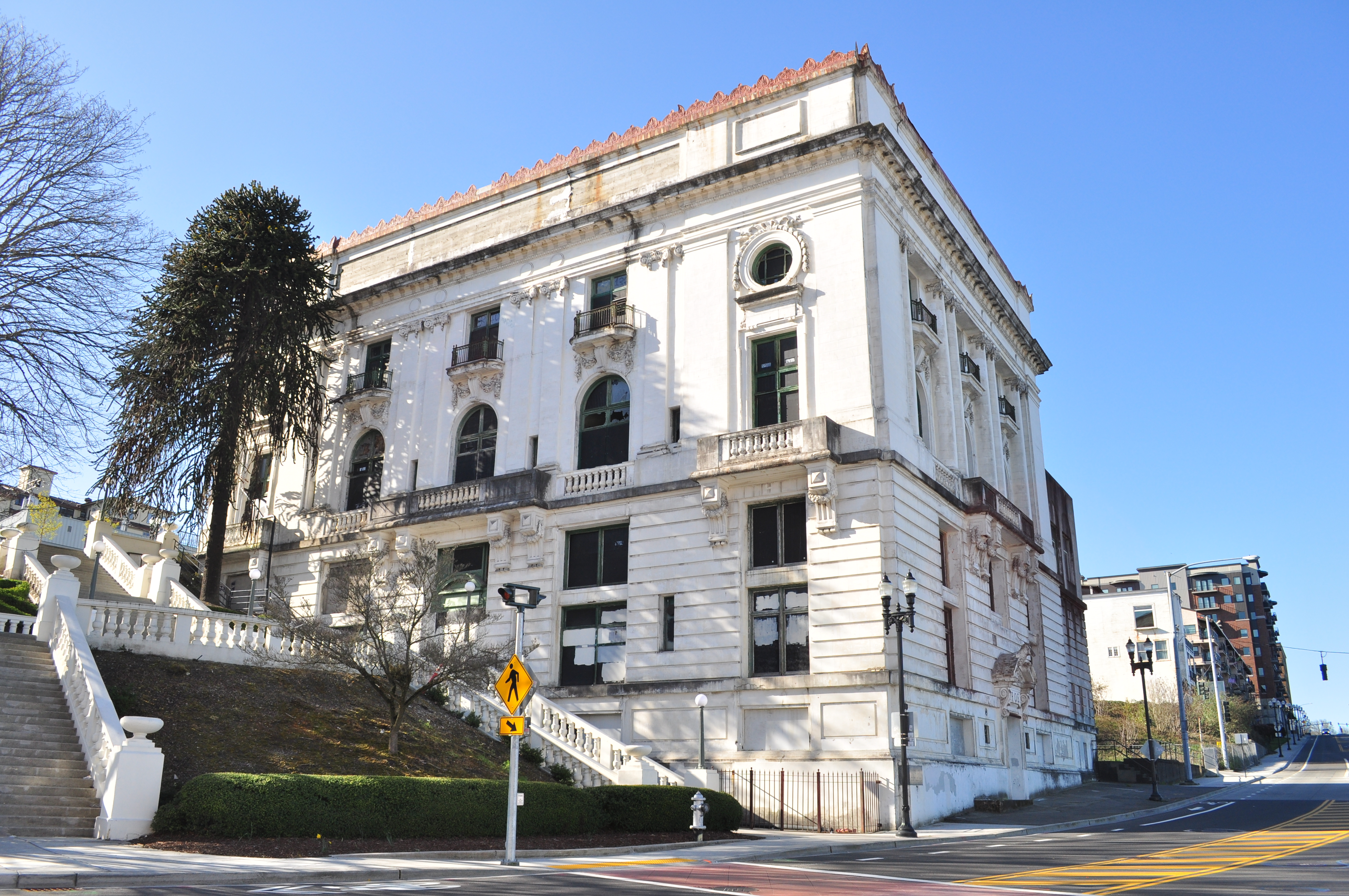
Elks Lodge in Tacoma, Washington, designed by Champney, completed in 1916, and photographed in 2015, shortly before it was restored as a McMenamins.

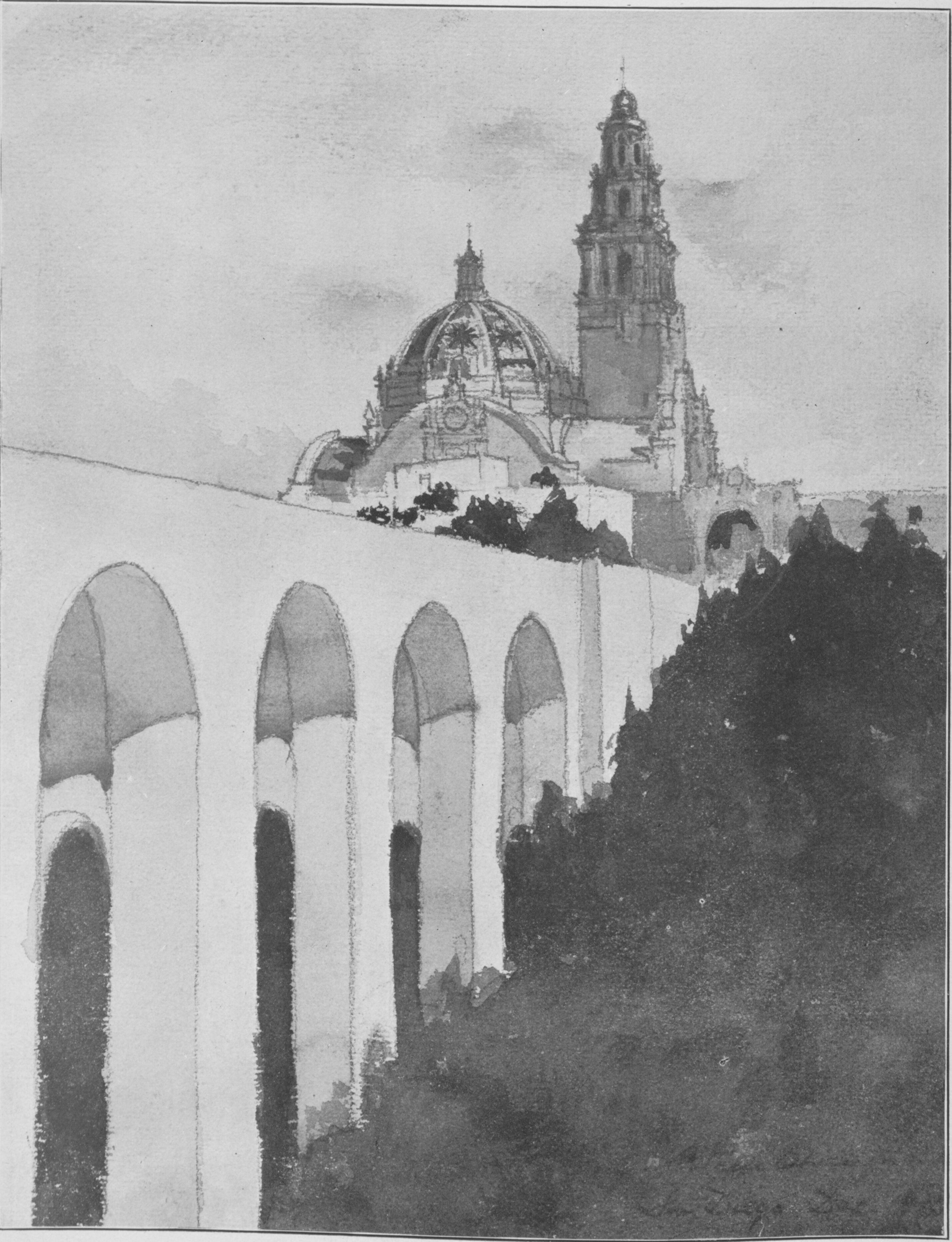
"At San Diego", watercolor by Champney circa 1916

Edouard Frere Champney (May 4, 1874 - June 4, 1929) was an architect in the United States. He worked on buildings that are now listed on the National Register of Historic Places (NRHP) and partnered with various architects including A. Warren Gould at Gould and Champney from 1909 until 1912, and Champney and Remey. He was principal at Édouard Frère Champney, Architect, Berkeley, California, from 1926 to 1929.

Champney was born in Écouen, France, the son of the American painter James Wells Champney. He was named after his godfather, the French painter Pierre Édouard Frère.

== Works ==
- Peace Palace (1909)
- Seattle City Light Office Building (1910)
- Seattle Civic Center Plan (1910)
- New Richmond Hotel at 308 4th Avenue South in Pioneer Square, Seattle (1911) NRHP listed (Gould & Champney)
- Rogers Building (1911), 470 Granville, Vancouver, Canada
- Seattle YWCA at 1118 Fifth Avenue and Seneca (1914), NRHP listed
- Elks Temple (Tacoma, Washington) (1916)
- Women's University Club of Seattle (1922), with Abraham H. Albertson
- St. Mark's Episcopal Cathedral, Seattle (1931)
- 1001 Terry Avenue Apartment Building in Seattle
- Bekins Storage Company Warehouse Project in Seattle
