= Dearborn-Massar =

American photography firm

Practice information
- Firm type: Architectural photography
- Partners: Phyllis Dearborn; Robert J. Massar
- Founded: ca. 1943
- Dissolved: ca. 1963
- Location: New York, New York; Seattle, Washington

Dearborn-Massar was a mid-20th-century American firm specializing in architectural photography founded by Phyllis Dearborn (1916–2011) and Robert J. Massar (1915–2002).

== Background of founders ==
Phyllis Dearborn was born in 1916 and raised in Seattle, Washington. She graduated with a degree in liberal arts from the University of Washington in 1937. She went on to study photography at the Clarence H. White School of Photography. Her style was influenced by the F/64 group of photographers that coalesced around Ansel Adams, with whom she took courses at the Museum of Modern Art in New York. She was admired for the formal precision and balance of her photographic compositions. At one point, she went to Italy to document photographically the architectural work of Andrea Palladio and Filippo Brunelleschi.

In the mid 1960s, Dearborn began volunteering in the prints and photographs department at the Metropolitan Museum, developing into a scholar of European prints. She occasionally curated exhibitions of prints and photographs in New York, and she was a participant in the New York Photo League's major 1948 retrospective. She published art historical articles and monographs, notably several articles and a book on the 17th century Italian printmaker Stefano della Bella. She also frequently contributed photographs to articles by other scholars. She was a good friend of the photographer Imogen Cunningham and of the architectural historian Esther McCoy, with whom she shared an interest in Italian architecture.

A native of Washington state, Robert J. Massar received his bachelor's degree in architecture from the University of Washington in 1940.

Dearborn and Massar married, setting up houses in New York, where they lived in the winter, and Seattle, where they lived in the summer.

== Work by the firm ==
The pair worked as architectural photographers under the professional name Dearborn-Massar, focusing their efforts on the Pacific Northwest from the early 1940s through the early 1960s. They shot negatives and transparencies of the interiors and exteriors of both homes and businesses, and their oeuvre profusely documents the regional version of modernist architecture that is sometimes called the Northwest Contemporary style. Architects whose work they photographed include Ralph Anderson, Pietro Belluschi, Mary Lund Davis, J. Lister Holmes, Paul Hayden Kirk, Wendell Lovett, Ellsworth P. Storey, Victor Steinbrueck, Roland Terry, and Paul Thiry.

Robert died June 11, 2002, and Phyllis died January 8, 2011. An archive of their firm's work during the period 1943–1963, the Phyllis and Robert Massar Photograph Collection of Pacific Northwest Architecture, is held at the University of Washington. It comprises some 6000 prints and negatives and some 400 color transparencies.
