= College of Built Environments =

Architecture and urban planning school of the University of Washington

Coordinates: 47°39′18″N 122°18′46″W

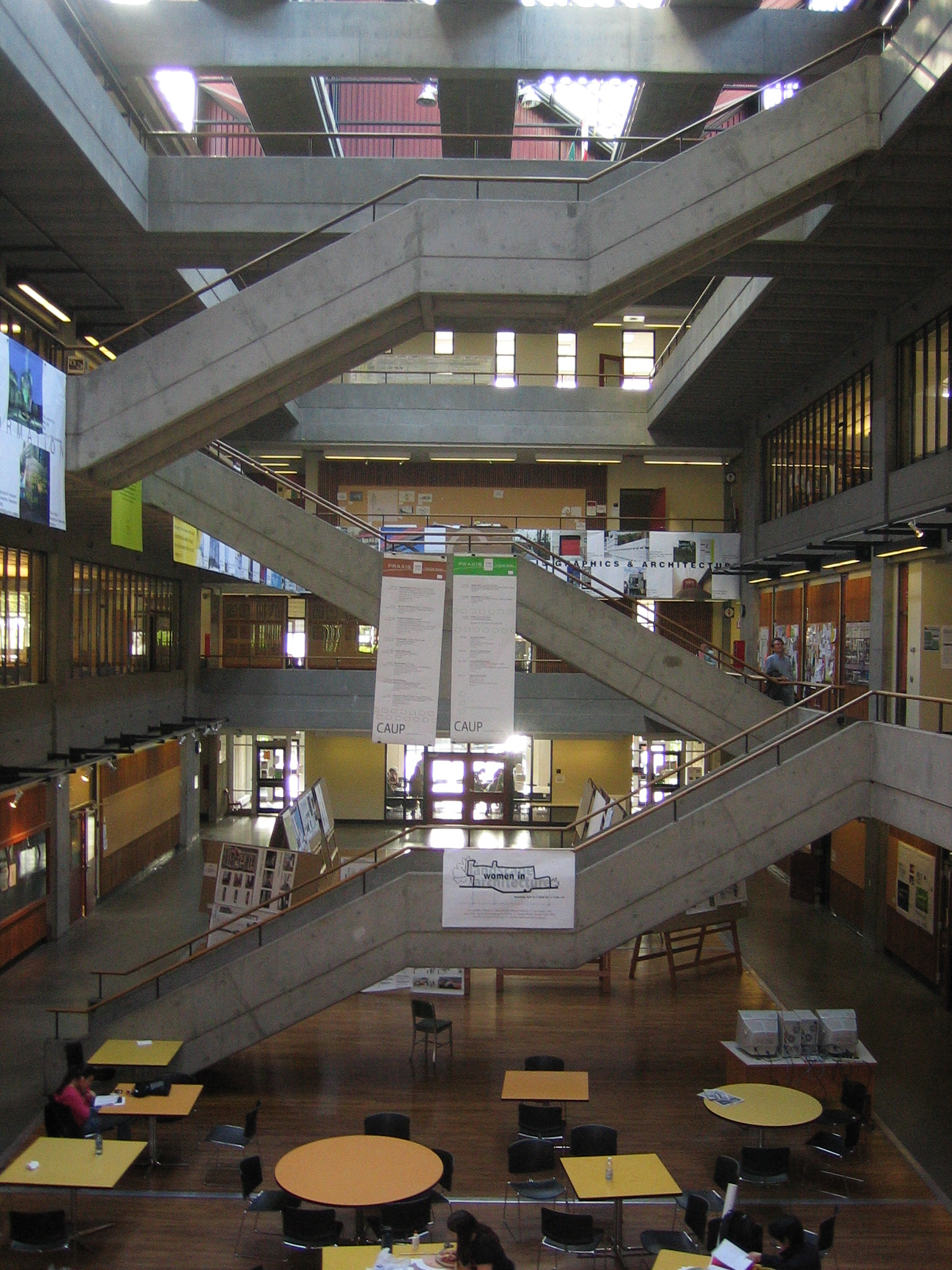
- Atrium of Gould Hall
- Former names: Department of Architecture (1914–1957); College of Architecture and Urban Planning (1957–2009)
- Type: Public
- Established: 1957
- Parent institution: University of Washington
- Dean: Ken Yocom
- Location: Seattle, Washington, U.S.
- Website: be.uw.edu

The College of Built Environments is the architecture and urban planning school of the University of Washington, a public research university in Seattle, Washington, United States.

The College offers programs in architecture, construction management, landscape architecture, real estate, and urban planning. From 1957 to 2009, the College was known as the College of Architecture and Urban Planning. Today, the College of Built Environments is made up of five core units: Architecture/Architectural Design, Construction Management, Landscape Architecture, Real Estate, and Urban Design & Planning. It also houses two interdisciplinary Ph.D. degrees, as well as several other interdisciplinary centers and institutes. The 2009 name change reflects an integrated approach to planning, design, and construction that will be necessary to take on the 21st-century global challenges of urbanization and climate change.

== History ==
The college traces its history to 1914, when the Department of Architecture was founded (initially as a subdivision in a College of Fine Arts). The department grew slowly and focused strictly on architecture until the early 1940s, when a city planning curriculum was inaugurated.

After the Second World War, the architecture and planning programs grew rapidly. The College of Architecture and Urban Planning was established in 1957; Arthur Herrman was the first dean. Architecture and Urban Planning (now Urban Design and Planning) were established as separate departments within the CAUP by 1961; Landscape Architecture and Building Construction (now Construction Management) were established as departments later in the 1960s. In 2017, the program in Real Estate, initially housed in the Department of Urban Design & Planning, became the Runstad Department of Real Estate. Other degrees and programs were added in the last fifty years, for example the Ph.D. in the Built Environment in 2003.

In 2007, the faculty of the college began searching for a new name. The Regents of the University of Washington approved the name in fall 2008. The College of Built Environments name became official effective in January 2009.

== Facilities ==
The College is housed in Gould Hall (named after Carl F. Gould, founder and first head of the Department of Architecture), Architecture Hall (constructed 1907–9 to serve as a chemistry building, but used during the Alaska–Yukon–Pacific Exposition as the Fine Arts Palace), and several smaller structures.

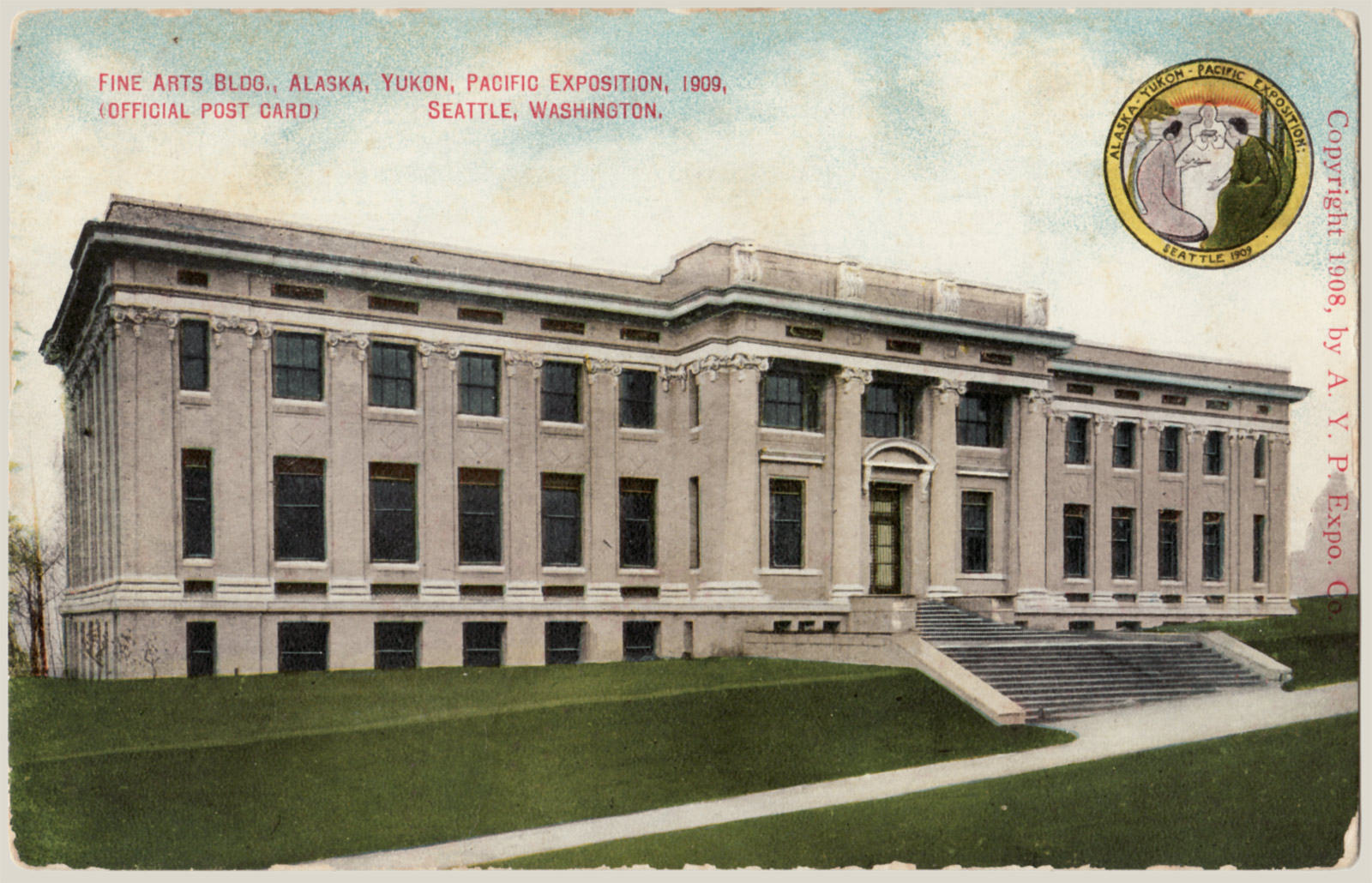
Architecture Hall in 1909

The College has multiple facilities for supporting the work of students, faculty, and staff, including the Fabrications Labs (a 6000 square foot facility with tools and equipment for wood and metal fabrication as well as CNC tools and equipment for digital fabrication), the Digital Commons (which houses Computing Services for the College), and the Visual Resources Collection. The Built Environments Library, a unit of the University of Washington Libraries is housed on the third floor of Gould Hall.

== Departments, programs, and administration ==
The five CBE departments offer degrees in architecture, landscape architecture, construction management, urban planning and real estate. The College offers a college-wide Ph.D. in the Built Environment, and participates in an interdisciplinary Ph.D. in Planning. Two interdisciplinary certificate programs are shared by multiple departments across the college: Urban Design and Historic Preservation.

The CBE is led by interim Dean Ken Yocom who is advised by several Associate Deans. The Dean heads the CBE Executive Committee which includes the Associate Deans, the Department Chairs, and other administrative and staff leaders in the college. The Dean is also advised by the College Council, the elected faculty council (similar to the elected faculty councils found in all University of Washington schools and colleges). The College Council provides a structure for direct faculty input at the highest level of college administration. The CBE also has a college-wide Staff Council and a college-wide Student Council, vehicles for staff and student participation in college governance.

== Notable faculty ==
- Steve Badanes
- Thomas Bosworth
- Francis D.K. Ching
- Meredith Clausen
- Lee Copeland
- Carl F. Gould
- Richard Haag
- Grant Hildebrand
- Phillip Jacobson
- Norman Johnston
- Wendell Lovett
- David Miller
- Jeffrey Ochsner
- Sergio Palleroni
- Lionel Pries
- Hermann Pundt
- Michael Pyatok
- John Schaufelberger
- Paul Schell
- Victor Steinbrueck
- David Streatfield
- Sharon E. Sutton
- Harlan Thomas
- George Tsutakawa
- Astra Zarina

== Notable alumni ==
- Ken Anderson
- Ralph Anderson
- Elizabeth Ayer
- Fred Bassetti
- Welton Becket
- Leon Bridges
- Lee Copeland
- James K. M. Cheng
- Mary Lund Davis
- Dave Dederer
- Robert L. Durham
- Alexander Ifeanyichukwu Ekwueme
- L. Jane Hastings
- Anne Gould Hauberg
- Steven Holl
- Perry Johanson
- A. Quincy Jones
- Grant Jones
- Paul Hayden Kirk
- Tom Kundig
- Wendell Lovett
- Benjamin McAdoo
- David McKinley (architect)
- George Nakashima
- Laurie Olin
- Norman Pfeiffer
- Peter Steinbrueck
- Victor Steinbrueck
- Jennifer Taylor
- Roland Terry
- Paul Thiry
- Wang Chiu-Hwa
- Walter Wurdeman
- Minoru Yamasaki
- Astra Zarina
