= Grant Hildebrand =

American architect (1934–2025)

Grant Hildebrand (September 16, 1934 – November 26, 2025) was an American architect and architectural historian who was Professor Emeritus in the Department of Architecture in the College of Built Environments at the University of Washington in Seattle.

== Life and career ==
Hildebrand earned his Bachelor of Architecture degree from the University of Michigan in 1957 and subsequently worked for the offices of Albert Kahn and Minoru Yamasaki. After completing his Master of Architecture at the University of Michigan in 1964, he joined the faculty of the Department of Architecture at the University of Washington, where he taught until the year 2000. At Washington, Hildebrand taught architectural design, architectural history, and a variety of other classes. He received the University's Distinguished Teaching Award in 1975. In 1978, he became interested in the work of the English geographer Jay Appleton, who developed the theory about the innate appeal of certain landscapes. Hildebrand applied these ideas to architectural space, teaching a course on this topic beginning in 1988.

His early research and writing drew on his time with the firm of Albert Kahn, leading to Designing for Industry: The Architecture of Albert Kahn (1974). Hildebrand's interest in the work of Jay Appleton is reflected in two books, The Wright Space: Pattern and Meaning in Frank Lloyd Wright's Houses (1991) and Origins of Architectural Pleasure (1999) which received the Washington Governor's Writers' Award. Hildebrand's recent publications have focused on architecture and design by his friends and colleagues, including books on the houses of Wendell Lovett and Arne Bystrom, designs by Phillip Jacobson, and architecture by Gene Zema, by George Suyama, and by Gordon Walker.

Hildebrand later lived at Horizon House in Seattle. He died on November 26, 2025, at the age of 91.

== Books ==
- Designing for Industry: The Architecture of Albert Kahn, MIT Press, Cambridge MA, 1974
- The Wright Space: Pattern and Meaning in Frank Lloyd Wright's Houses, University of Washington Press, Seattle and London, 1991. ISBN 978-0-295-97108-7
- Origins of Architectural Pleasure, University of California Press, Berkeley and London, 1999. ISBN 978-0-520-21505-4
- with T. William Booth, A Thriving Modernism; The Houses of Wendell Lovett and Arne Bystrom, University of Washington Press, Seattle and London, 2004. ISBN 978-0-295-98433-9
- with Ann and Leonard K. Eaton, Frank Lloyd Wright's Palmer House, University of Washington Press, Seattle and London, 2007. ISBN 978-0-295-98640-1
- Elegant Explorations: The Designs of Phillip Jacobson, University of Washington Press, Seattle and London, 2007. ISBN 978-0-295-98719-4
- with Miriam Sutermeister, A Greek Temple in French Prairie, c Marion Dean Ross Chapter, Society of Architectural Historians, self-published for regional libraries, 2007
- Suyama: A Complex Serenity, Marquand Books with University of Washington Press, Seattle and London, 2011. ISBN 978-0-295-99081-1
- Gene Zema, Architect, Craftsman, University of Washington Press, Seattle and London, 2012. ISBN 978-0-295-99123-8
- Little Wooden Buildings: the Puget Sound School, c Marion Dean Ross Chapter, Society of Architectural Historians, self-published for regional libraries, 2014
- Gordon Walker, a Poetic Architecture, Arcade, Lucia/Marquand, and University of Washington Press, Seattle and London, 2019 (ISBN 978-1-7328214-0-8)

== Videos ==
- UWTV Classics, "Upon Reflection: Art, Architecture and the Pacific Northwest," Grant Hildebrand (TV interview), 1988
