= Allied Arts of Seattle =

Coordinates: 47.634827°N 122.278978°W

Allied Arts of Seattle is a non-profit organization in Seattle, Washington, USA. The organization advocates for public funding of the arts, better urban planning and architecture, and other civic improvements. The organization claims to be the "oldest non-profit organization in Seattle dedicated to urban livability", but, in any case, at 50+ years old it is certainly a venerable organization by the standards of a city barely older than 150 years. It was a major force in establishing the Seattle Arts Commission, creating Seattle Center on the grounds of the Century 21 Exposition (1962 world's fair) and preserving historical landmarks and neighborhoods, particularly Pioneer Square and Pike Place Market, as well as defeating the 2012 Seattle Olympic bid.

== Early history ==
Allied Arts grew out of the Beer & Culture Society organized in early 1952 by University of Washington drama professor John Ashby Conway. Other early members were U.W. professors Lloyd Schram, Robert Dietz, and Norman J. Johnston, assistant Seattle Art Museum director Sherman Lee, and architect John Stewart Detlie. On October 3, 1954, the Beer & Culture Society convened a "Congress" of the Arts that established Allied Arts as a permanent organization. Detlie became its first president. A second Congress in 1955 led to formal incorporation. By 1956, Allied Arts represented 57 local arts organizations and 55 artists and activists, including Kenneth Callahan, George Tsutakawa, and Lucile Saunders McDonald.

The new group convinced the city to create an advisory Municipal Art Commission. The Commission, created August 1, 1955, published a master plan on June 23, 1956, which reads like a list of what would occur in Seattle over the next few decades. They proposed dedicating 2 percent of city capital funds to purchase art works (which in 1973 became One Percent for Art); establishing an annual city arts festival (Bumbershoot, established 1971); hosting a world's fair (the Century 21 Exposition, 1962); public funding for the Seattle Symphony; creating opera and ballet companies (the Seattle Opera, founded 1963, and Seattle's Pacific Northwest Ballet, founded 1972 as Pacific Northwest Dance Association, are now among the leading institutions of their kind in the country); burying public utility lines; preserving historic landmarks; and planting street trees. The group also campaigned for a State Arts Commission (founded 1961). Their proposal to prohibit billboards met with lesser success (billboards in Seattle are now highly regulated, but not prohibited).

Allied Arts and the Arts Commission campaigned for a new civic center. Voter approval in November 1956 of a $7.5 million bond issue to upgrade the Civic Auditorium into an Opera House (later remodeled again as McCaw Hall) proved to be the first step toward the creation of the grounds for the Century 21 Exposition, later site of Seattle Center. Robert J. Block emerged as a leader during this period. He later helped establish the arts funding group Allied Arts Foundation.

== Preservation ==
Central Seattle's cityscape in the 1950s had changed little since before the Great Depression. Many buildings from the late 19th and early 20th century survived, but most were in poor shape, and the success of Boeing was gradually turning Seattle into a more prosperous city. These older buildings were either going to be renovated or replaced. Allied Arts stood foursquare on the side of preservation. Under the leadership of architects Victor Steinbrueck, Fred Bassetti, and Ibsen Nelsen, the group was prominent in the creation of the Pioneer Square Historic District (1970) and the Seattle Landmarks Preservation Board (1973), and were key supporters of a 1971 initiative that preserved Pike Place Market. With respect to this last, an Allied Arts committee reconstituted itself in 1964 as the independent organization Friends of the Market; Since 1974, Allied Arts and Friends of the Market have each been allocated two of the twelve seats on the Market Historical Commission which operates independently of other Market governance bodies with the specific mandate to preserve the Market's physical and social character as "the soul of Seattle."

In this period, Allied Arts also advocated for the creation of the Seattle Design Commission that now guides municipal architecture. Other prominent Allied Arts leaders in this period were "secretary" and manager Alice Rooney, Jerry Thonn, Peggy Golberg, Lew Pritchard, Alf Collins, and Rae Tufts.

A new generation of Allied Arts leaders emerged in this period. Paul Schell, later mayor, came to prominence as Allied Arts president and led the successful effort to establish One Percent for Art, with a more powerful Seattle Arts Commission replacing the earlier Municipal Art Commission. In the 1980s, Margaret Pageler and Victor Steinbrueck's son Peter Steinbrueck, both later members of the Seattle City Council were instrumental in the Citizens Alternative Plan (CAP) that put a moratorium for some years on new Downtown skyscrapers. Allied Arts also played a role in this period in establishing funding and changing zoning to promote artists' housing, and in the plans for facilities at the former Sand Point Naval Air Station.

Not everything was a victory. In January 1992, despite much protest, the Music Hall Theater at 7th and Olive was demolished despite its landmark status. In the wake of its destruction, Allied Arts—led in this period by Mia McEldowny, Karen Kane, Walt Crowley, and Clint Pehrson, among others— pushed for stronger historic preservation laws and creation of transferable development rights (TDRs). The latter allow a landowner to sell "air rights" to a neighbor. For example, the owner of a 3-story downtown building can sell development rights to an adjacent high-rise, guaranteeing that people in that side of the high-rise will not have their views blocked, and obtaining compensation for the commitment not to build a tall building adjacent to that high-rise.

Well into the 1990s, Allied Arts retained the anti-growth stance that had led to the CAP initiative. They opposed the Seattle Commons plan that would have reconfigured South Lake Union and opposed Seattle's bid to host the 2012 Olympic Games.

That anti-urban orientation changed under presidents Clint Pehrson, Alex Steffen, David Yeaworth and Philip Wohlstetter. During this period the organization focused on both how to encourage smart growth, and how to make the ensuing density livable.

In recent years (as of 2008) Allied Arts have played an important role in promoting discussion of what is to happen to Seattle's Central Waterfront once the Alaskan Way Viaduct is torn down. Allied Arts president David Yeaworth has advocated for rerouting Washington State Route 99 (SR-99) into a tunnel. The People's Waterfront Coalition, who advocate for having SR-99 no longer run continuously through the city in any manner grew out of an Allied Arts charette.
