= Leland M. Roth =

American architectural historian

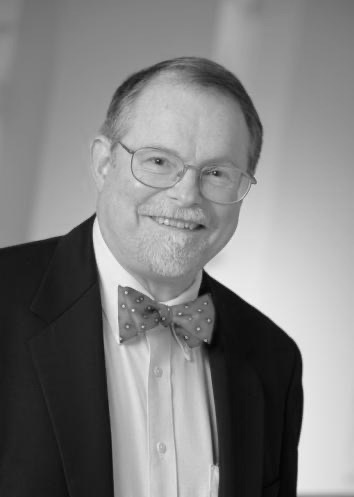
- Born: 22 March 1943 (age 83)
- Citizenship: American
- Children: Amanda C. Roth Clark

Academic background
- Education: Yale University
- Doctoral advisor: Vincent Scully

Academic work
- Discipline: architectural history
- Institutions: University of Oregon

Leland M. Roth (born 22 March 1943) is an American architectural historian who is the Marion Dean Ross Distinguished Professor of Architectural History emeritus in the Department of the History of Art and Architecture in the University of Oregon College of Design at the University of Oregon. His career began at The Ohio State University, then Northwestern University, and the University of Oregon, where he taught courses on U.S. architecture, eighteenth-century European architecture, Native American architecture, Oregon architecture, and the history of how music was performed and heard within architectural space. Roth’s studies of American and world architecture are among the most assigned and read books in university courses on the history of the built environment, and his work, Understanding Architecture, was translated into Spanish, Portuguese, and Turkish. Roth drafted dozens of plans, sections, and elevations for his many publications, which include Choice Reviews outstanding titles. His publications are known for their unique narrative voice, and for their assertion that style and context remain important to the scholarly discipline of architectural history. While at the University of Oregon, Roth helped create the graduate Program in Historic Preservation and taught in the annual Preservation Field School.

== Education ==
In 1966, Roth earned a Bachelor of Architecture degree from the University of Illinois where he studied under Alan K. Laing, a founder of the Society of Architectural Historians, Hermann Pundt, a leading expert in the life of Karl Friedrich Schinkel, and the Armenian architect Gabriel Guevrekian. During his undergraduate years, he was influenced by the American architect, Louis Kahn (who once visited Roth and his classmates in their design studio).

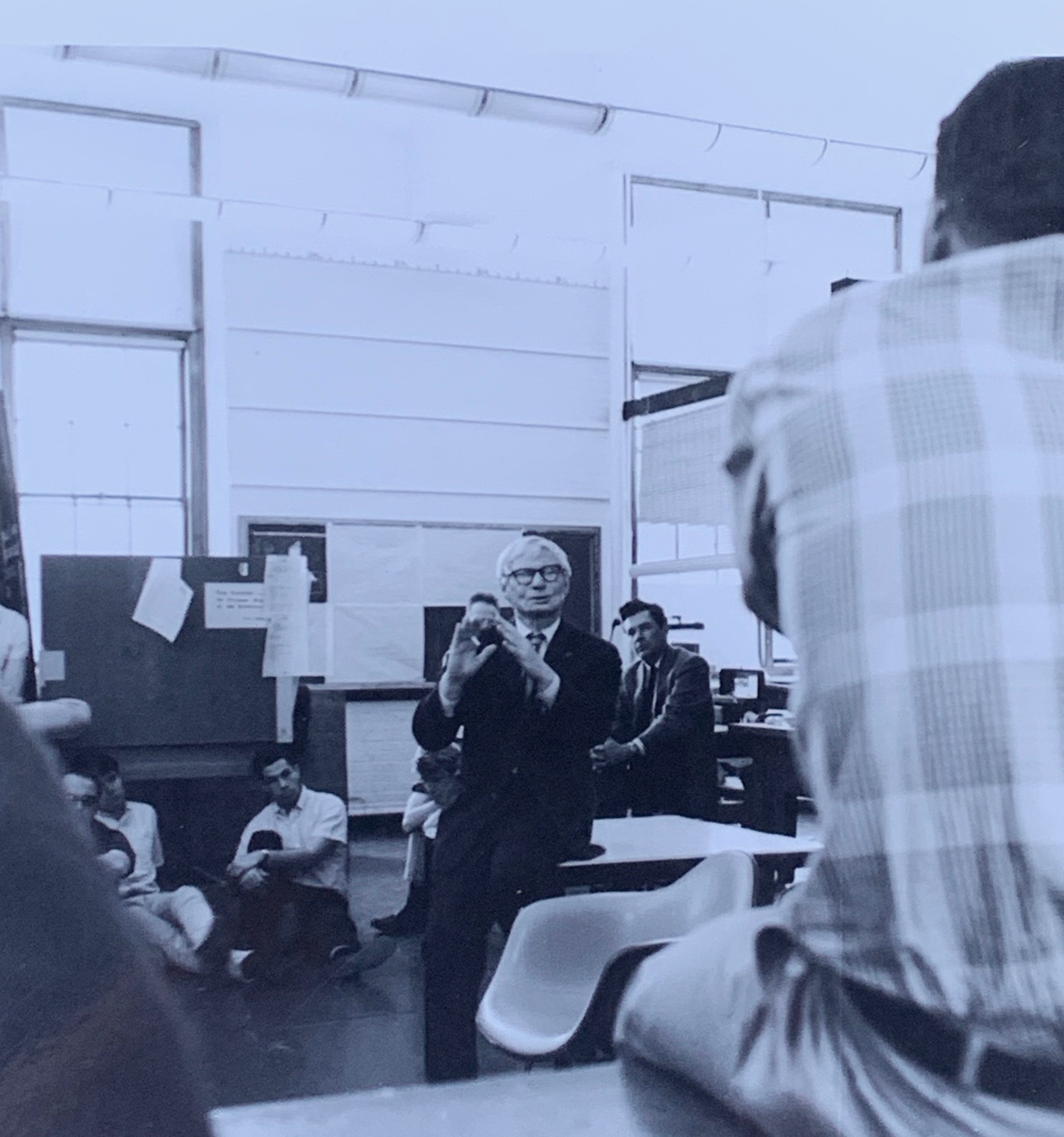
Louis I. Kahn visiting the University of Illinois architecture studios in the 1960s

In 1973, he acquired a Ph.D. in architectural history from Yale University under the mentorship of historian Vincent Scully. His doctoral research focused primarily on American architecture from 1865 to 1940, especially the work of architects Charles Follen McKim, William Rutherford Mead, and Stanford White. While at Yale, Roth studied under the notable art historians Henry-Russell Hitchcock, Kerry Downes, Terukazu Akiyama, and Heinrich Klotz.

== Life and Works ==
In addition to contributing to such online architectural history databases as The Oregon Encyclopedia and SAH Archipedia, he has written several articles on prominent architects such as the Oregon designer John Yeon. In 2012, Roth delivered a commemorative talk on architectural historian Marion Dean Ross, as part of an exhibit in Knight Library at the University of Oregon, titled, “Marion Dean Ross: The Legacy of a Scholar,” which ran from January–April. In that presentation, Roth discusses the wide-reaching impact of Ross both as scholar and professor. In July 2012, he was featured on the Oregon Humanities Center UO Today show. He is best known for his books: A Concise History of American Architecture (1979); McKim, Mead & White, Architects (1983); Understanding Architecture: Its Elements, History, and Meaning (1993); Shingle Styles: Innovation and Tradition in American Architecture, 1874 to 1982 (1999); and American Architecture: A History (2001). Roth’s daughter, Amanda C. Roth Clark, collaborated with him in the third and fourth editions of Understanding Architecture: Its Elements, History, and Meaning (2013) and the second edition of American Architecture: A History (2018).

== Honors ==
He was awarded a fellowship from the National Endowment for the Humanities during the 1982-83 academic year to conduct research on American worker’s housing from 1865-1925. In 1985, Roth was awarded the Henry L. Kamphoefner grant to explore the history of the model house designs published in the Ladies’ Home Journal from 1895-1920. In 2020, the Society of Architectural Historians board of directors awarded its highest honor, SAH Fellow, to Leland Roth based on his distinguished lifetime of significant contributions to the field of architectural history. Roth is only the second person working in the Pacific Northwest, following after former University of Oregon architectural historian, Marian Card Donnelly, to have been named an SAH Fellow.

== Books ==
- Roth, Leland M., A Concise History of American Architecture, Harper & Row, New York, 1979
- Roth, Leland M., McKim, Mead & White, Architects, Harper & Row, New York, 1983
- Roth, Leland M., Understanding Architecture: Its Elements, History, and Meaning, Icon Editions, New York, 1993
- Roth, Leland M., Shingle Styles: Innovation and Tradition in American Architecture, 1874 to 1982, Norfleet Press/Harry N. Abrams, New York, 1999
- Roth, Leland M., American Architecture: A History, Icon Editions/Westview Press, Boulder CO, 2001
- Roth, Leland M., Understanding Architecture: Its Elements, History, and Meaning, Routledge, 3rd edition, 2013
- Roth, Leland M., American Architecture: A History, Routledge, 2nd edition, 2018
