= Norman Johnston =

Norman J. Johnston (3 December 1918 – 16 March 2015) was a Professor in the Departments of Architecture, Landscape Architecture, and Urban Planning in the University of Washington College of Built Environments.

== Education ==
Johnston was born in Seattle and raised in Olympia, Washington. His father, Jay Johnston, was the resident supervisor during the construction of the Washington State capitol complex. Johnston enrolled at the University of Washington, planning to study architecture, but graduated in 1942 with a B.A. in art. He subsequently earned his B.Arch. from the University of Oregon, graduating in 1949. He earned a Master of Urban Planning in 1959 and a Ph.D. in 1964 at the University of Pennsylvania.

== Career ==
Johnston was a staff member for the Seattle Planning Commission from 1950–54 and then was employed by the Seattle architecture firm, Nelson, Sabin & Varey, from 1954 to 1956. After a brief period as a faculty member at the University of Oregon, he was appointed Associate Professor of Architecture and Planning at the University of Washington in 1960.

Over his academic career, Johnston taught courses in architecture, landscape architecture, and urban planning. He served as Assistant to the Dean from 1962 to 1964 and then as Associate Dean from 1966 to 1983. He was Chair of the Department of Architecture from 1983 to 1984. As a college administrator he helped to build the college library (now Built Environments Library) and the college slide collection (now Visual Resources Collection). He also worked to build the collection of architectural drawings and papers held at the University of Washington Libraries Special Collections Division. It was largely through his efforts that Elizabeth Ayer gave her family papers and drawings to the Special Collections Division of the University of Washington Libraries.

Johnston's publications focused on the history of the region, including the Washington State capitol complex and the University of Washington campus. He also wrote about the history of the Department of Architecture and the College of Built Environments (formerly the College of Architecture & Urban Planning).

== Public service ==
During his years on the faculty, Johnston engaged in a broad range of university and public service. Johnston served on the University of Washington Landscape Advisory Committee beginning in 1970 and several times was its chair; in 2007 he was granted a lifetime voting privilege on the Committee. He was the founding chair of the Washington Capitol Master Plan Advisory Committee; he served as Chair from 1982 to 1988 and again in 1996, and he remained on the Committee for almost two decades. He was a founding member of Allied Arts of Seattle in 1952; in the 1960s he was a leader in Allied Arts's fight for legislation in Olympia to eliminate billboards. He served on the Washington State Architectural Registration Board from 1970 to 1981 and again from 1988 to 1999. He served as AIA Seattle president in 1981.

Johnston was elected a Fellow in the American Institute of Architects in 1982; he received the AIA Seattle Chapter Medal in 1990. He was a co-recipient, with his wife L. Jane Hastings, of the Leslie Boney Spirit of Fellowship Award given by the AIA College of Fellows. He received the Washington State Distinguished Citizen Award in 1991.

== Writings ==
- Johnston, Norman J., Cities in the Round University of Washington Press, Seattle and London, 1983. ISBN 978-0-295-95918-4
- Johnston, Norman J., Washington's Audacious State Capitol and its Builders, University of Washington Press, Seattle and London 1988, ISBN 978-0-295-96467-6
- Johnston, Norman J., The College of Architecture and Urban Planning, Seventy Five Years at the University of Washington: A Personal View, College of Architecture and Urban Planning, Seattle 1991.
- Johnston, Norman J., The Fountain and the Mountain: The University of Washington Campus, Documentary Book Publishers, Woodinville WA, 1995; second edition: Documentary Media and the University of Washington, 2004 ISBN 978-0-9719084-1-3
- Johnston, Norman J., The Campus Guides: the University of Washington, Princeton Architectural Press, New York, 2001, ISBN 978-1-56898-247-2
