= Jeffrey Karl Ochsner =

Architect, architectural historian, and professor

Jeffrey Karl Ochsner (born 1950) is an architect, architectural historian, and professor at the University of Washington in Seattle. He is known for his research and writing on American architects Henry Hobson Richardson and Lionel H. Pries, and on Seattle architecture; he has also published articles that link architecture and psychoanalysis.

== Career ==
Ochsner graduated from Rice University with a B.A. in Architecture in 1973 and a Master of Architecture (M.Arch.) in 1976. He worked for Gunnar Birkerts and Associates in Michigan in 1973-74. He was owner/principal of a Houston-based architectural practice, Ochsner Associates, from 1984 to 1987. The firm was responsible for the architecture of the Galveston Island Trolley.

Ochsner has taught at the University of Washington since 1988. He was Chair of the Department of Architecture from 1996 to 2002. He served as Associate Dean in the College of Built Environments (CBE) from 2007 to 2019, and as CBE Advisor on Policy & Procedure from 2019 to 2020.

Ochsner's first book,H. H. Richardson: Complete Architectural Works, went through six printings; roughly 30,000 copies are in print. He wrote Shaping Seattle Architecture: A Historical Guide to the Architects. The first edition of Shaping Seattle Architecture went through two printings, with 10,000 copies in print.

Ochsner's co-authored book, Distant Corner: Seattle Architects and the Legacy of H. H. Richardson, was selected as one of "100 Top Books by 100 UW Authors" by Columns: University of Washington Alumni Magazine in December 2006. His book, Lionel H. Pries, Architect, Artist, Educator: From Arts and Crafts to Modern Architecture, was a Finalist for the Washington State Book Award in History/Biography in 2008. Publication of Distant Corner and Lionel H. Pries was supported by grants from the Graham Foundation for Advanced Studies in the Fine Arts. The Second Edition of Shaping Seattle Architecture: A Historical Guide to the Architects received the Heritage Publication Award from Historic Seattle in May 2015. Ochsner's articles have appeared in Journal of the Society of Architectural Historians, JAE: Journal of Architectural Education, Buildings & Landscapes, Pacific Northwest Quarterly, American Imago, and other journals.

Ochsner was recognized as a Fellow in the American Institute of Architects in 1996. The Association of Collegiate Schools of Architecture selected Ochsner as one of five recipients of the 2012 ACSA Distinguished Professor Award. Ochsner is included in the 2007 book The Things They've Done by William T. Cannady.

Ochsner is married to Sandra Lynn Perkins, a trusts and estates attorney.

Ochsner was diagnosed with a choroidal melanoma in 1997; radiation treatment was successful.

In June 2023, Ochsner received the 2023 Outstanding Faculty Award of the UW College of Built Environments.

In 2026, Ochsner received the Washington State Historic Preservation Officer's (SHPO's) Career Achievement Award.

== Writings and presentations ==
=== Books ===
- Ochsner, Jeffrey Karl, editor/co-author, Shaping Seattle Architecture: A Historical Guide to the Architects Second Edition, University of Washington Press, Seattle and London 2014, ISBN 978-0-295-99348-5. First Edition: AIA Seattle and University of Washington Press, Seattle and London 1994, ISBN 978-0-295-97365-4
- Ochsner, Jeffrey Karl, Furniture Studio: Materials, Craft, and Architecture University of Washington Press, Seattle and London, 2012. ISBN 978-0-295-99155-9
- Ochsner, Jeffrey Karl, Lionel H. Pries, Architect, Artist, Educator: From Arts and Crafts to Modern Architecture University of Washington Press, Seattle and London, 2007. ISBN 978-0-295-98698-2
- Ochsner, Jeffrey Karl, and Andersen, Dennis Alan, Distant Corner: Seattle Architects and the Legacy of H. H. Richardson, University of Washington Press, Seattle and London 2003, ISBN 978-0-295-98238-0
- Ochsner, Jeffrey Karl, H. H. Richardson: Complete Architectural Works, MIT Press, Cambridge MA and London, 1982, ISBN 0-262-15023-9

=== Selected essays ===
- Ochsner, Jeffrey Karl, "The Experience of Prospect and Refuge: Frank Lloyd Wright's Houses as Holding Environments," American Imago 75 (Summer 2018), pp. 179–211.
- Ochsner, Jeffrey Karl, "Meditations on the Empty Chair: The Form of Mourning and Reverie," American Imago 73 (Summer 2016), pp. 131–163.
- Ochsner, Jeffrey Karl, "The Staten Island September 11 Memorial: Creativity, Mourning and the Experience of Loss," in Grief and Its Transcendence: Memory, Identity, Creativity, eds. Adele Tutter and Léon Wurmser, Routledge, London, 2015, pp. 30–47.
- Ochsner, Jeffrey Karl, "Behind the Mask: A Psychoanalytic Perspective on Design Studio," JAE: Journal of Architectural Education 53 (May 2000), pp. 194–206.
- Ochsner, Jeffrey Karl, "A Space of Loss: The Vietnam Veterans Memorial," JAE: Journal of Architectural Education 50 (February 1997), pp. 156–171.
- Ochsner, Jeffrey Karl, "Understanding the Holocaust through the United States Holocaust Memorial Museum" JAE: Journal of Architectural Education 48 (May 1995), pp. 240–249.

=== Videos ===
- "Town Square: Seattle's Greatest Architects," interview with Feliks Banel at Town Hall, Seattle, September 29, 2014
- "Back to the Future: Architecture at UW -- The First Fifty Years, 1914-1964," Jeffrey Karl Ochsner, Department of Architecture 100th Anniversary Lecture Series, May 6, 2015
