= Lionel Pries =

American architect (1897–1968)

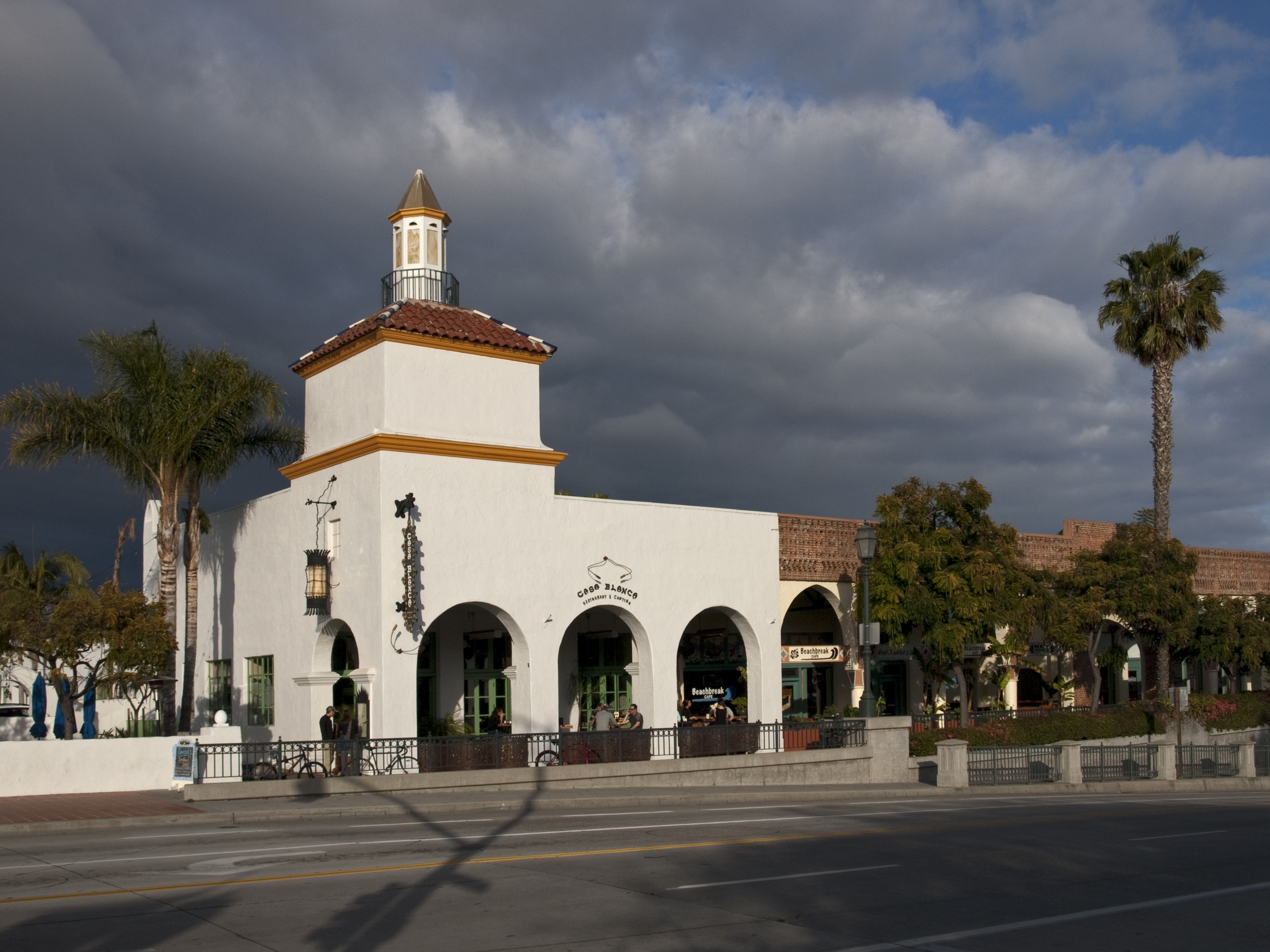
The Andalucia Building in Santa Barbara, California with the brick facade designed by Pries in 1926 (to the right); the white stucco portion (to the left) was a later modification by another architect.

Lionel H. ("Spike") Pries (June 1, 1897 – April 7, 1968), was a leading architect, artist, and educator in the Pacific Northwest.

== Early life and education ==
Lionel Pries was born in San Francisco and raised in Oakland. His father worked at the S. & G. Gump store in San Francisco, known for its departments addressing Chinese and Japanese arts and crafts; as a result young Lionel Pries developed early familiarity with the artistic traditions of Asia. He graduated from Lick-Wilmerding High School in San Francisco in 1916. He received his B.A. in Architecture from the University of California, Berkeley, in 1920, where he studied under John Galen Howard. He then studied under Paul Cret at the University of Pennsylvania, earning his M.A. in 1921.

== Career ==
After travel in Europe, he returned to San Francisco where he practiced architecture for the next four years, although he spent a year in Santa Barbara (designing buildings for the Bothin Helping Fund) after the 1925 earthquake.

In 1928, Pries moved to Seattle to join Penn classmate William J. Bain in the firm Bain & Pries. Initially successful, the firm could not survive the Depression and dissolved in late 1931. Thereafter Pries focused on his career as an educator, although he occasionally took on architectural projects under his own name.

Pries joined the faculty of the Department of Architecture at the University of Washington in fall 1928 and soon became the center of the school. From 1928 to 1958, he was the inspirational teacher of a generation of architecture students at Washington, among them Minoru Yamasaki, A. Quincy Jones, Ken Anderson, Paul H. Kirk, Roland Terry, Fred Bassetti, Victor Steinbrueck, Perry Johanson, Wendell Lovett, and many others.

From 1931 to 1932, Pries served as Director of the Art Institute of Seattle (predecessor to the Seattle Art Museum). For a time he was part of the circle of Northwest artists that included Kenneth Callahan, Morris Graves, and Guy Anderson. Pries exhibited as an artist (oils, watercolors, drypoint prints) in the late 1920s and from the mid-1930s to the mid-1940s. He was also a collector of Latin American and Asian art objects.

Beginning in the late 1920s and continuing to 1942, Pries travelled to Mexico every summer and regularly interacted with leaders in Mexican art including William Spratling, Frederick W. Davis, Rene d'Harnoncourt, Juan O'Gorman, and others. Pries's architectural works from the late 1930s to the 1960s showed a mix of Modernism and regionalism, reflecting the profound influence of what he encountered in Mexico.

Pries was gay, but deeply closeted in the University of Washington community. He anticipated teaching at least until he reached retirement age, but was forced to resign his university position in 1958 after he was picked up in a vice sting in Los Angeles. The reason for Pries's abrupt departure from the university was concealed for nearly fifty years.

== Death ==
Pries worked as a drafter until he was able to retire in 1964, then lived quietly until his death in 1968.

== Posthumous ==
In 1981, the University of Washington College of Architecture and Urban Planning (now College of Built Environments) established the Lionel Pries Endowed Fund, to honor Pries through an annual event as part the College Lecture Series. In 1984, architecture student Drew Rocker published an essay on Pries in the regional design journal Arcade. In the mid-1980s, students in the College established a student-selected award to recognize teaching excellence and named it the "Lionel 'Spike' Pries Teaching Award."

Pries's influence and significance were cited by many of his students, notably Yamasaki in his autobiography and Steinbrueck in several books on Seattle architecture. Pries is also cited in recent monographs on Minoru Yamasaki, A. Quincy Jones, Roland Terry, and Wendell Lovett & Arne Bystrom.
