= Fred Bassetti =

American architect (1917–2013)

Fred Bassetti (January 31, 1917 in Seattle – December 5, 2013 in Oregon) was a Pacific Northwest architect and teacher. His architectural legacy includes some of the Seattle area's more recognizable buildings and spaces. The American Institute of Architects (AIA) described his role as a regional architect and activist as having made significant contributions to "the shape of Seattle and the Northwest, and on the profession of architecture."

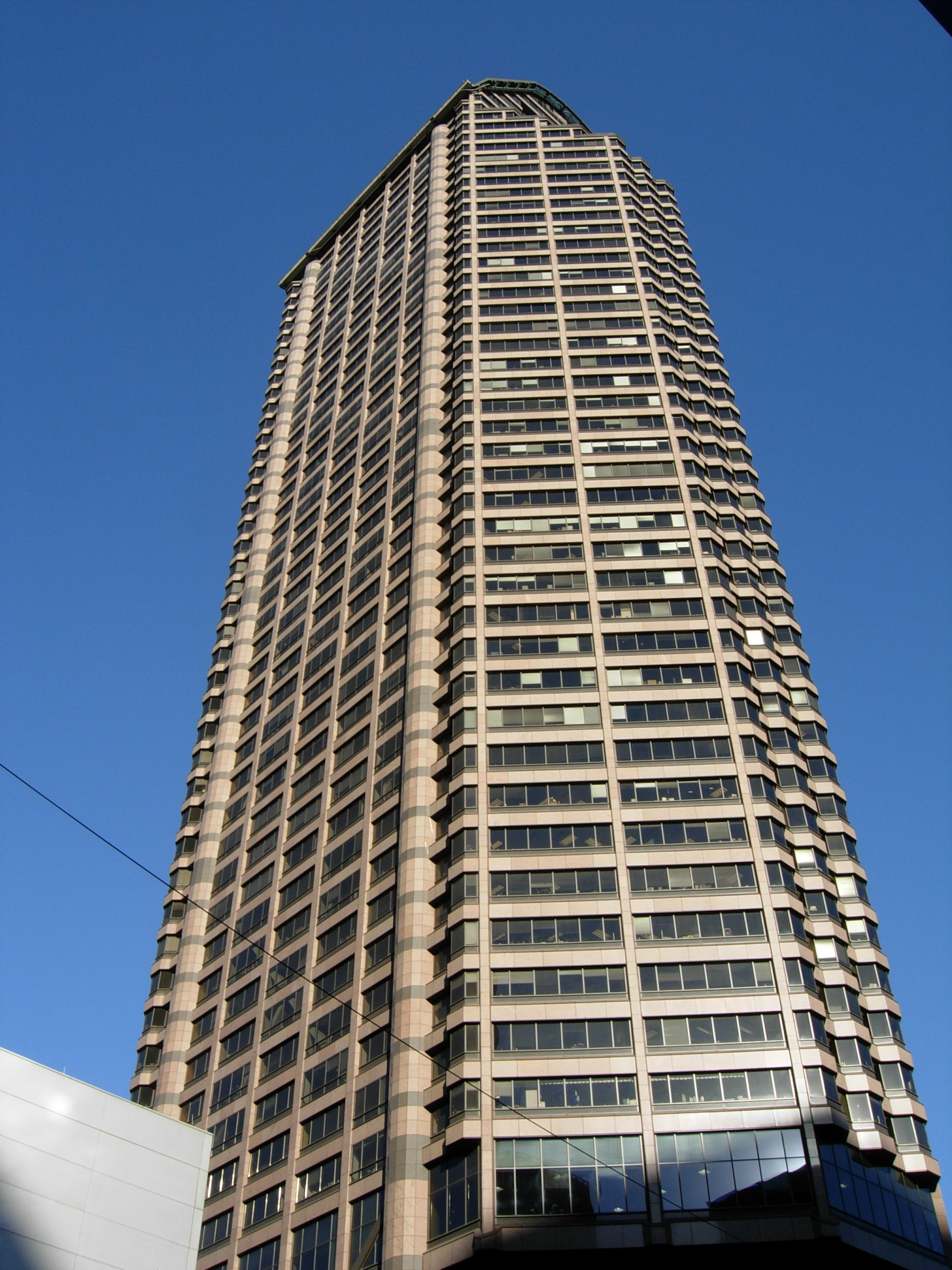
Seattle Municipal Tower, completed 1990

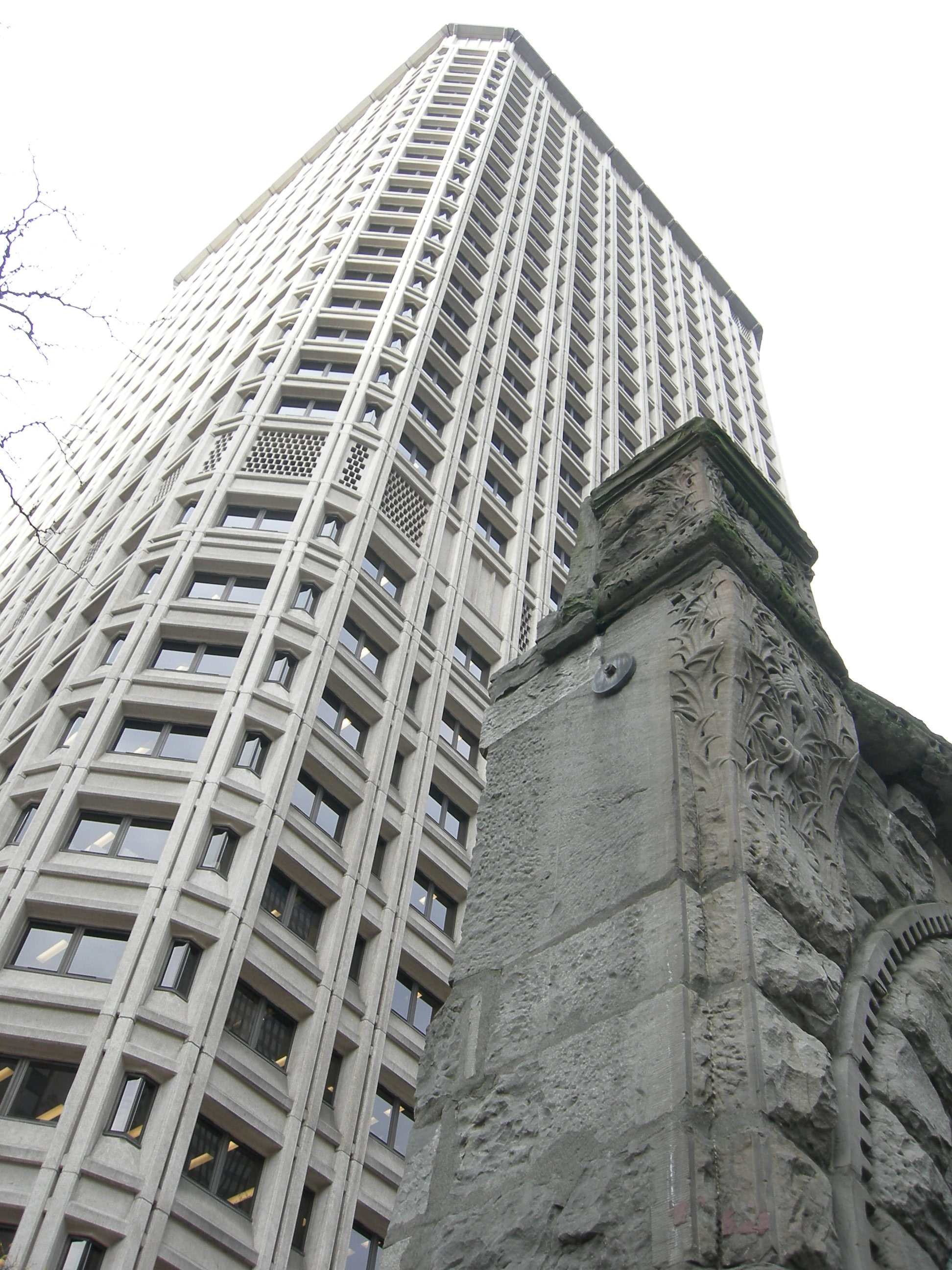
Henry M. Jackson Federal Building, completed 1974

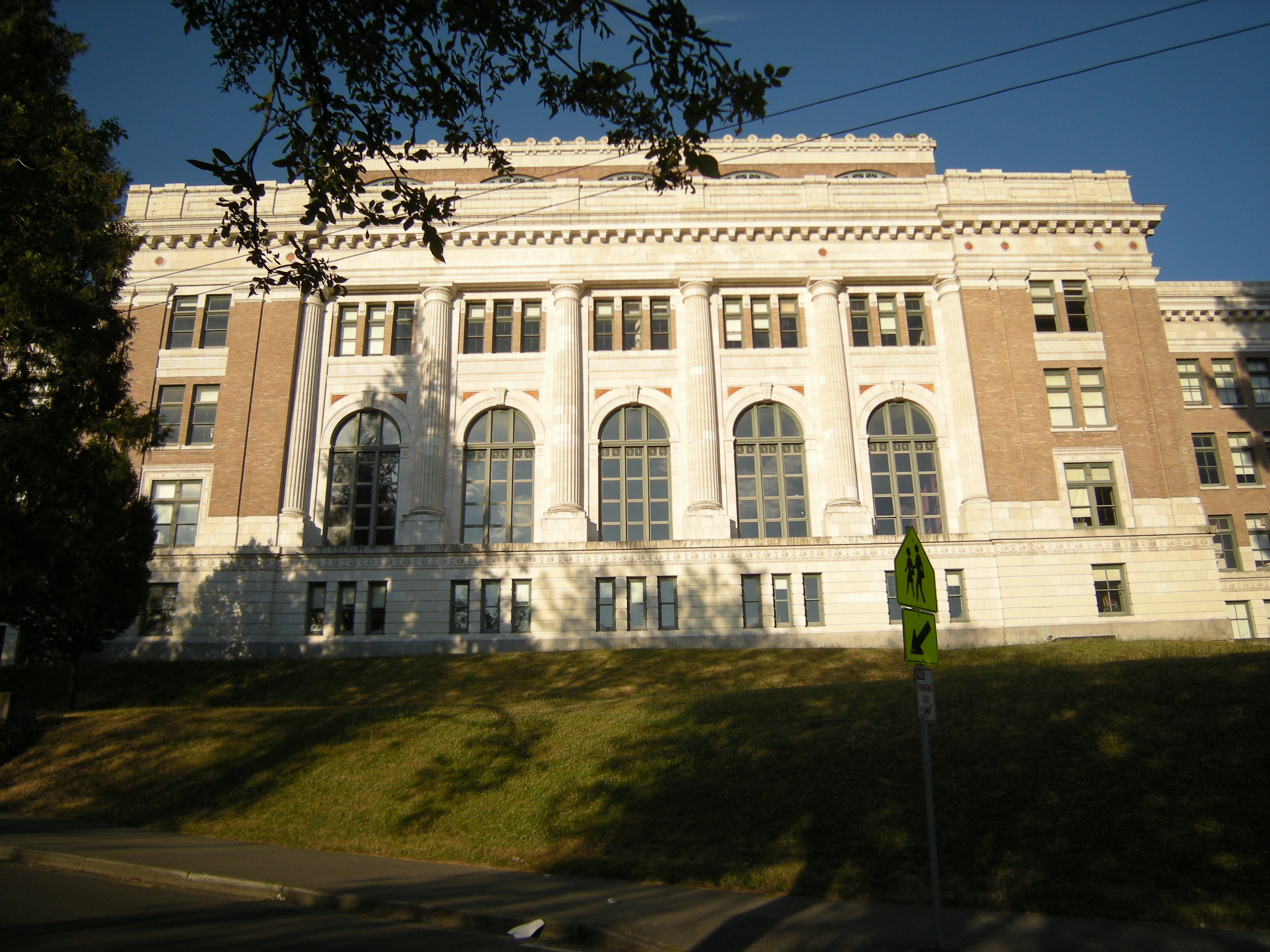
Franklin High School, major renovation 1990

== Early life, education, and career ==
Born in Seattle to Norwegian and Italian immigrants, Bassetti grew up south of Seattle and spent a year with his paternal family in Turin, Italy. After graduating from Seattle's Garfield High School he studied engineering for a year before switching to architecture, earning a Bachelor of Architecture from the University of Washington in 1942. During World War II, he worked as a draftsman with the Federal Public Housing Authority and with Seattle architect Paul Thiry. After the war he studied at the Harvard Graduate School of Design under Walter Gropius and Marcel Breuer, was in the same class as I.M. Pei, and graduated with a Masters of Architecture in 1946.

Bassetti worked for Alvar Aalto in Boston before returning to Seattle where he worked for Naramore Bain Brady Johanson (NBBJ) 1946–1947. Within his first year there, a Bassetti-designed house won an award sponsored by The Seattle Times and the local AIA office. In 1947 he established his first firm by renting space in the office of friend Jack Morse; together they established the architectural firms of Bassetti & Morse, Architects (1947–1962), with Wendell Lovett as one early employee, and later Honolulu-based Bassetti, Morse and Tatom, Architects. In 1962 Bassetti and Morse separated, with Bassetti first practicing as Fred Bassetti & Company, Architects, later as Bassetti Norton Metler Architects with partners Skip Norton and Richard Metler, then also with Karlis Rekevics as Bassetti/Norton/Metler/Rekeviks Architects. In 1990 Lorne McConachie became a partner. By 1994 Bassetti and all other titled principals had retired. The firm has since operated as Bassetti Architects under McConachie and new partners.

Bassetti's teaching career included positions as a guest critic at Columbia University, lecturing at Columbia University, MIT, Rice University, and the Universities of Washington, Oregon, Idaho, and British Columbia.

== Architectural legacy ==
Fred Bassetti has been grouped with other Seattle architects of the period in what is sometimes called the "Northwest School", whose work in the years after 1945 was said to reflect and/or embody the spirit of the Pacific Northwest. Architects sometimes included in this group include Lionel Pries, Arne Bystrom, Wendell Lovett, Paul Kirk, Roland Terry, Alan Liddle, Gene Zema, Ralph Anderson, and others. Several living members of the group were profiled in the 2010 film "Modern Views."

Various commentators have suggested that key features of the Northwest School's work are the influence of the Pacific Northwest climate and landscape on modern design, materials selection, and a legacy of environmental responsibility. Concrete and steel are hallmarks of modernism, but in the Pacific Northwest there was also a passion for natural materials. Wood framing, wood siding and wood shingles often appeared in Bassetti's early residential projects. An easily recognizable feature of many later Bassetti designs is a softening of edges, from the chamfered corners of the Jackson Federal Building, Key Tower (now Seattle Municipal Tower), and dormitory buildings at Western Washington University and of Central Washington University, to rounded corners that to Bassetti feel "good to the human hand."

When asked in 2009 which of his projects he takes greatest pride, Bassetti cited "the Forrest and Martin Residences, the Lisbon Embassy ("the building, on a great site, draws together Portuguese and American characteristics, using local materials") and the East Pine Receiving Station (for Seattle City Light).

== Selected projects ==
(List of AIA award-winning projects and collaborating firms):

=== Major projects (1947–1994) ===
- Seattle Aquarium
- Henry M. Jackson Federal Building, Seattle
- Seattle Municipal Tower (formerly AT&T Gateway Tower, then Key Tower), Seattle
- U.S. Embassy, Lisbon, Portugal
- Inglemoor High School, Kenmore, Washington
- Children's Zoo at Woodland Park, Seattle
- Lakeside School, Seattle
- University of Washington Engineering Library and Loew Hall, Seattle
- Ellensburg Dormitories ("the Bassetti Dorms") at Central Washington University, Ellensburg, Washington
- Central WA State College Library
- Library, Ridgeway Dormitories and related buildings at Western Washington University, Bellingham, Washington
- WWU College of Education Student Union Building, Bellingham, Washington
- PACCAR Technical Facility, Mount Vernon, Washington
- Franklin High School renovation, Seattle, Washington
- Seattle City Light East Pine Receiving Station, Seattle
- Benton County PUD Administration Bldg., Kennewick, Washington
- East Shore Unitarian Church, Bellevue, Washington
- Island Park School, Mercer Island, Washington
- KIRO-TV Broadcast House, Seattle
- Architect's Office, 2027 Fifth Avenue, Seattle
- Seattle Mental Health Institute
- Sanitary Public Market Building, Seattle

=== Residential projects (1947–1994) ===
- G. J. Armbruster Residence (Lake Stevens)
- Gamma Rho Apartments (North 44th & Fremont, Seattle)
- Marshall Forrest Residence (Chuckanut Drive, Bellingham)
- Walter F. Isaacs Residence (Hilltop Community, Bellevue)
- Gerald Martin Residence (Seattle), *John O'Brien Residence (Seattle)
- Gerald Martin Residence
- Theo. Caldwell Residence (Bellevue)
- Schlosser Residence (Star Route #1, Union)
- Georgia-Pacific Idea House (Seattle)
- Doris and Jack Robertson Residence (Seattle)

== Awards ==
Prior to his retirement, Fred Bassetti and his firms received nearly 100 awards, including: AIA Fellowship (1968); AIA Seattle Medallist (1988); Academician of the National Academy of Design; "Best Local Architect" by readers of Seattle Weekly (1988); Pritzker Architecture Prize nominee (1989); Inductee, University of Washington, College of Architecture and Urban Planning, Roll of Honor, (2007), and 27 Awards of Merit or Honor Awards from AIA Seattle.

== Activism ==
Bassetti created and led Action: Better City (ABC). A design discussion initiative Bassetti started during his tenure as chairman of the Seattle chapter of the American Institute of Architects, ABC started during the post-1962 Worlds Fair push for progress in response to the stagnation of Seattle's urban core.

"The question that Bassetti has been answering, in his own way, for these four decades: how does an architect serve his home town? ... They can look to their own circle for mutual support and guidance, with Bassetti as a lifetime example."

== External links and bibliography ==
- AIA Seattle honors awards 1988
- AIA Seattle honors awards 1950 to present
- AIA Seattle memories - Bassetti, 10/18/1993
- Architecture Week
- Bassetti Architects corporate webpage
- Bizjournals.com 11/01/1999 column
- Sam Bennett, Daily Journal of Commerce, Snapshot - Lorne McConachie, July 21, 1999
- Seattle Community College Television - Artwork, Billy King interview with Fred Bassetti, 2004
- WWU oral histories - Fred Bassetti
