= University Unitarian Church =

Unitarian church in Seattle, Washington

- Interactive map of the University Unitarian Church area

General information
- Type: Church
- Architectural style: Northwest Regional style
- Location: Wedgwood Neighborhood, 6556 35th Ave NE, Seattle, WA, USA
- Coordinates: 47°40′37″N 122°17′23″W
- Completed: 1959
- Cost: $250,000
- Client: University Unitarian Church

Technical details
- Structural system: Wood Frame

Design and construction
- Architect: Paul Hayden Kirk
- Awards: American Institute of Architects

University Unitarian Church is a building designed by Seattle architect Paul Hayden Kirk in 1959. The church is located in the Wedgwood, Seattle neighborhood at the corner of 35th Avenue NE and 68th Street. The building is approximately a mile and half Northeast of the University of Washington Campus and sits across from the Northeast Branch of the Seattle Public Library. It was designed during the time when architect Kirk was working as a sole practitioner.

The University Unitarian Church won Paul Hayden Kirk the American Institute of Architects Award (1960).

== Church history ==
=== Early years ===
Unitarianism was brought to United States by the pilgrims and the puritans, with its origins found in the individualism and rational temper of those who settled Boston, Salem, and Plymouth. In 1909 the Alaska–Yukon–Pacific Exposition, which as a tribute to the City Beautiful Movement, sought to bring about social and political reform. The exposition encouraged the church to branch out West, to the University of Washington. As a direct result of the exposition, the University Unitarian church was established in 1913. In the beginning, the congregation met in a rented hall for its Sunday services. With the help of the Woman's Alliance for fund-raising, and the acquisition of Unitarian Universalist Association grants, the church was able to hire ministers and purchase their first church in 1915. They hired Ellsworth Storey to design their first building for $5000. The church was located at the corner of NE 47th Street and 16th Avenue NE, in Seattle. From 1927 to 1931 the Great Depression deeply affected the church's financial resources, requiring two ministers to come out of retirement to work without compensation.

The 1940s are reflected upon as the 'golden age' of the church as a result of the end of the great depression and general upbeat attitudes of the patrons during this time. In 1955 the church commissioned their second building, which was to be designed by Paul Hayden Kirk.

=== Architect ===
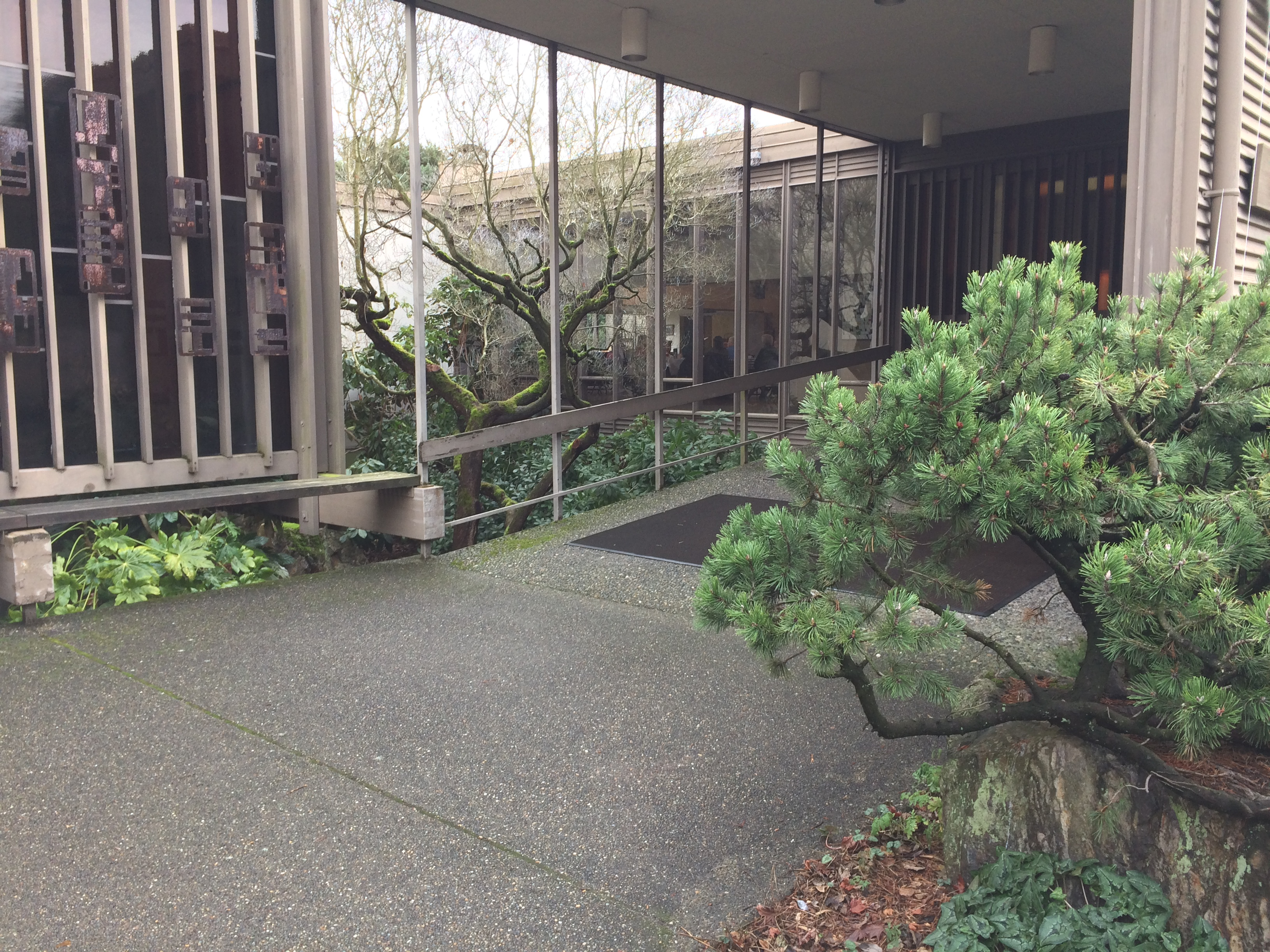
Entrance

Paul Hayden Kirk was born in Salt Lake City on November 18, 1914. He traveled to Seattle with his family in 1922 where he received his degree in architecture at the University of Washington in 1939. When he began his own practice in 1939, his scope of work was primarily residential. Kirk's earliest designs employed the use of historicist forms and detailing. In the coming years Paul H. Kirk began to move away from historical references in his work. This new attitude towards design can be seen in the Columbia Ridge development in 1942. His shift towards more modern designs can be explained by his admitted respect and admiration for Pietro Belluschi. It is also evident that many of Paul H. Kirk's designs draw upon the teachings of Ludwig Mies van der Rohe. Although Paul H. Kirk was a follower of Mies's motto, "God is in the details", he made it clear that he was not a supporter of the international style. Kirk believed the international style is "an architecture which has been imposed on the land by man." Where he differentiated himself from international style architects, was through the belief that architecture should respect and respond to its environment. This mentality shows through his work in the use of materials that are reflective of the northwest. Wood, rough-cut stone, and glass are seen throughout his projects. He also often incorporated large ceiling to floor windows in his residential designs because, with the Northwest's small diurnal temperature fluctuations, it could afford the heat loss in exchange for the feeling of openness. Aside from the modern style, Japanese architecture also had a powerful influence on him. This can be seen through the use of shoji screens for interior partitions, large simple openings, and his treatment of roof conditions. The combination of modernism, regional materials, and Japanese influences were all integral in assisting Kirk in beginning to define the Pacific Northwest Regional style.

=== Location ===
The district of Wedgwood, Seattle located approximately two miles Northeast of I-5 and 6 miles Northeast of Seattle's Downtown, is a middle class residential Seattle neighborhood. Its name originates from Wedgwood, an English bone china-maker. In respect to the built environment, developments in the neighborhood "were tremendously enhanced by the saving of some of the existing trees." Other typical architectural features in the neighborhood are brick veneer, hip roofs, asphalt shingles, planter boxes, small porches, stock wrought-iron railings, and one story houses. When masonry is employed, it is typically solely decorative.

== Architecture ==
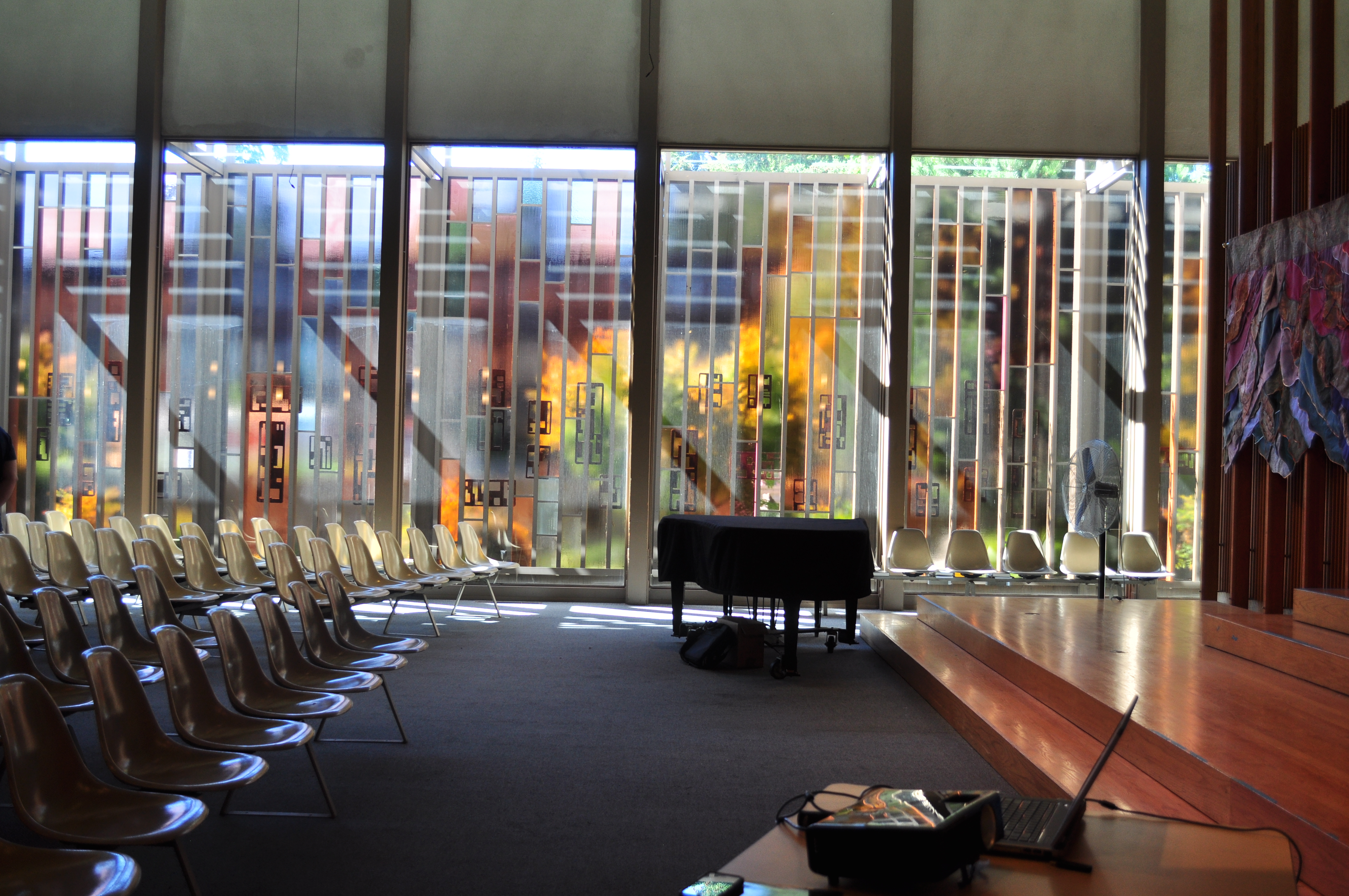
Sanctuary space in 2016

The design goal of the University Unitarian Church was to "be a place where people may gather for worship, where children may be taught to work and pray, and where the community is enriched by its presence." The building is recessed away from 35th NE due to the high usage of the street. A small courtyard is placed at the base of the western wall to further serve as a buffer to the street, which is highly used by the community. The building embraces this courtyard, indicative of Kirk's desire for site integration. The west façade of the University Unitarian Church exposes its structure and adheres to straight lines, typical of Kirk's work. The large structural vertical elements support detailed glass and screens. The detailed woodwork of the screens is another typical characteristic of Kirk's designs.

Clerestory windows are hung by large bolted beams on the upper portion of the East Facade, allowing for natural light to enter the space. The roof beams in the sanctuary transfer weight from the western walls to the shorter vertical supports of the eastern wall, resulting in a traditional church construction of evenly spaced bays, but an atypical sloped ceiling plane. Kirk uses change in ceiling height to bring attention to the sequential experience when walking through his building.

=== Preservation ===
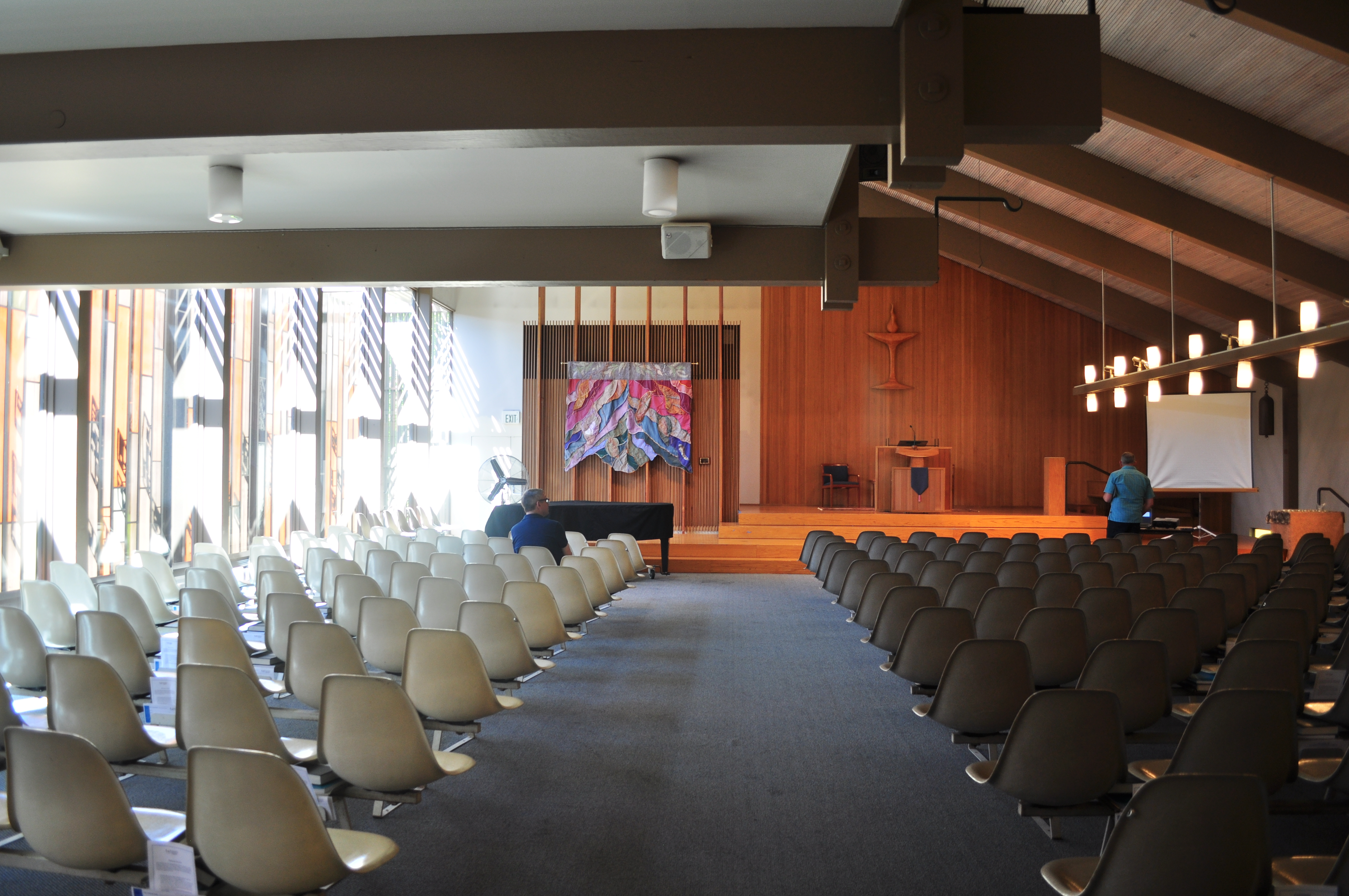
Sanctuary of University Unitarian Church, September 2016, after restoration.

The University Unitarian Church, given both its age and architectural significance, may now be considered for historic preservation. The church, having been built in 1959, is now eligible to be listed on the National Register of Historic Places in respect to the 'fifty-year rule.' This rule is a commonly accepted principle that for a building to be listed on the National Register for Historic Places, it must be at least fifty years old, that is, unless they are of 'significant importance.' Aside from its age, there must be a case made for the building's historical significance and/or aesthetic significance to be considered for acceptance. In the case of the University Unitarian Church, it has clear architectural significance, with its ties to the roots of Northwest regionalism. The justification for acceptance of buildings on the National Register based on aesthetics came around the late 1880s, with the desire to preserve colonial revival style buildings. The National Register's currant stance on determining significance of a property is association with events, activities, lives, or developments that were important in the past, have significant architectural history, landscape history, or engineering achievements, or if it has the potential to yield information through archeological investigation. The University Unitarian Church has the potential to argue for significance based on its connection to Paul Hayden Kirk as well as its connection to the origins to Pacific Northwest Regionalism, allowing it to be deemed significant in terms of architectural history.

The Secretary of the Interior's Standards' for the treatment of historic properties address four treatments of properties; preservation, rehabilitation, restoration, and reconstruction. Since the building is still in use today by the UUC congregation and is still in great physical condition, the most logical of treatments for the University Unitarian Church is preservation, defined by James Marston Fitch as, "the maintenance in the same physical condition as when it was received by the curatorial agency. Nothing is added or subtracted from the aesthetic corpus of the artifact. Any interventions necessary to preserve its physical integrity are to be cosmetically unobtrusive."

=== Style ===
The Pacific Northwest style has its earliest connections to the indigenous wooden houses along the northwest coast and Puget Sound. These indigenous houses utilized the cedar, which was easy to split to form boards. In addition to this, climate, terrain, history and social attitudes from British Columbia to Portland, Oregon all contribute to define the Pacific Northwest style.

=== Cost ===
The University Unitarian Church cost the congregation $250,000. Using the westegg.com inflation calculator, that sum is equivalent to approximately $1,800,000 in 2009.
