= Andalucia Building =

- U.S. National Register of Historic Places
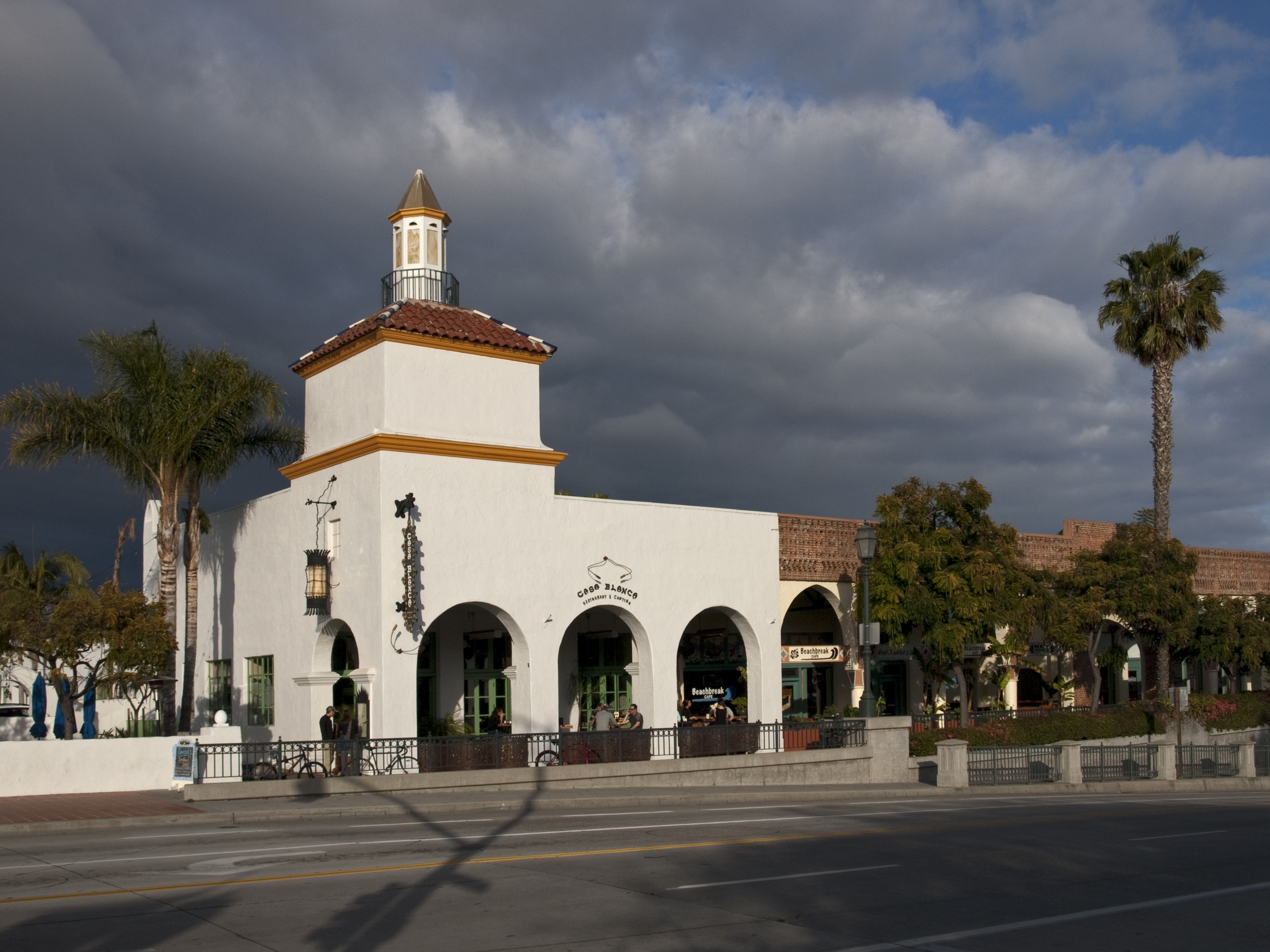
- The western corner of the building, view from State Street

- Location within California Location within the United States
- Location: 316-324 State St., Santa Barbara, California
- Coordinates: 34°24′56.7″N 119°41′37.2″W
- Built: 1911-1926
- NRHP reference No.: 99001592
- Added to NRHP: December 22, 1999

The Andalucia Building was built in 1911. It was listed on the National Register of Historic Places in 1999. The building is located on State Street, in the southeastern part of the historical center of Santa Barbara, California, immediately next to the Highway 101. The building is one of the few examples of Moorish architecture in Santa Barbara.

== History ==
What is now the rear part of the building was constructed in 1911, 1913, and 1917 as four brick garages. They were connected by a two-storey front-wall construction made of brick and concrete. The first floor contained auto-sales shops, whereas the second one housed the El Camino hotel. The building was owned by Henry Ernest Bothin, previously a San Francisco wealthy merchant, who moved to Santa Barbara in 1911. Since the highway 101 was completed about the same time, the area, which was adjacent to the highway, contained multiple garages and hotels.

The front portion was damaged by the 1925 earthquake. It was subsequently demolished and replaced by the front section in Moorish style which is still standing today. It was designed by a San Franciscan architect Lionel Pries. Generally, the downtown of Santa Barbara was rebuilt in the Colonial Revival style, and the Andalucia building, which preserved the Moorish appearance, became one of the few exceptions, which later earned it a listing in the National Register of Historic Places. In 1937, the building was converted into offices for Seaside Oil Company. The remodeling was performed by local architects Carleton Winslow and R. H. Pitman. In the same year, the rear was remodeled so that a part of the brickstone wall was replaced by an opening. The project was designed by Chester Carjola, also a local architect. The building subsequently changed owners several times, which led to less extensive remodeling works.

== Architecture ==
The building is a block which consists of four one-floor brick rectangular buildings with gable roofs. They all have a common flat-roof facade built in the Spanish Colonial Revival style. The front portion is an arcade with fifteen arches, which has space for six shops. The rear part of the building, which are the former garage buildings, is divided into multiple spaces for shops. The frames inside are made of steel.
