= 1925 Santa Barbara earthquake =

Earthquake in California, US

- UTC time: 1925-06-29 14:42:16
- ISC event: 910569
- USGS-ANSS: ComCat
- Local date: June 29, 1925
- Local time: 06:44
- Magnitude: 6.5 M_{w}; 6.8 M_{w}
- Depth: Unknown
- Epicenter: 34.3°N 119.8°W
- Type: probably left-lateral reverse
- Areas affected: Central Coast (California); United States
- Total damage: $8 million
- Max. intensity: MMI IX (Violent)
- Casualties: 13 deaths

The 1925 Santa Barbara earthquake hit the area of Santa Barbara, California on June 29, with a moment magnitude between 6.5 and 6.8 and a maximum Mercalli Intensity of IX (Violent). It resulted in 13 deaths and destroyed the historic center of the city, with damage estimated at $8 million (about $111 million in 2017).

== Earthquake ==
Although no foreshocks were reported felt before the mainshock, a pressure gauge recording card at the local waterworks showed disturbances beginning at 3:27 a.m., which were likely caused by foreshocks. At 6:44 a.m. the mainshock occurred which lasted 19 seconds. The epicenter of the earthquake was located in the sea off the coast of Santa Barbara, in the Santa Barbara Channel. The fault on which it occurred appears to have been an extension of the Mesa fault or the Santa Ynez system. The earthquake was felt from Paso Robles (San Luis Obispo County) to the north to Santa Ana (Orange County) to the south and to Mojave (Kern County) to the east.

=== Damage ===
Major damage occurred in the city of Santa Barbara and along the coast, as well as north of Santa Ynez Mountains, including Santa Ynez and Santa Maria valleys.

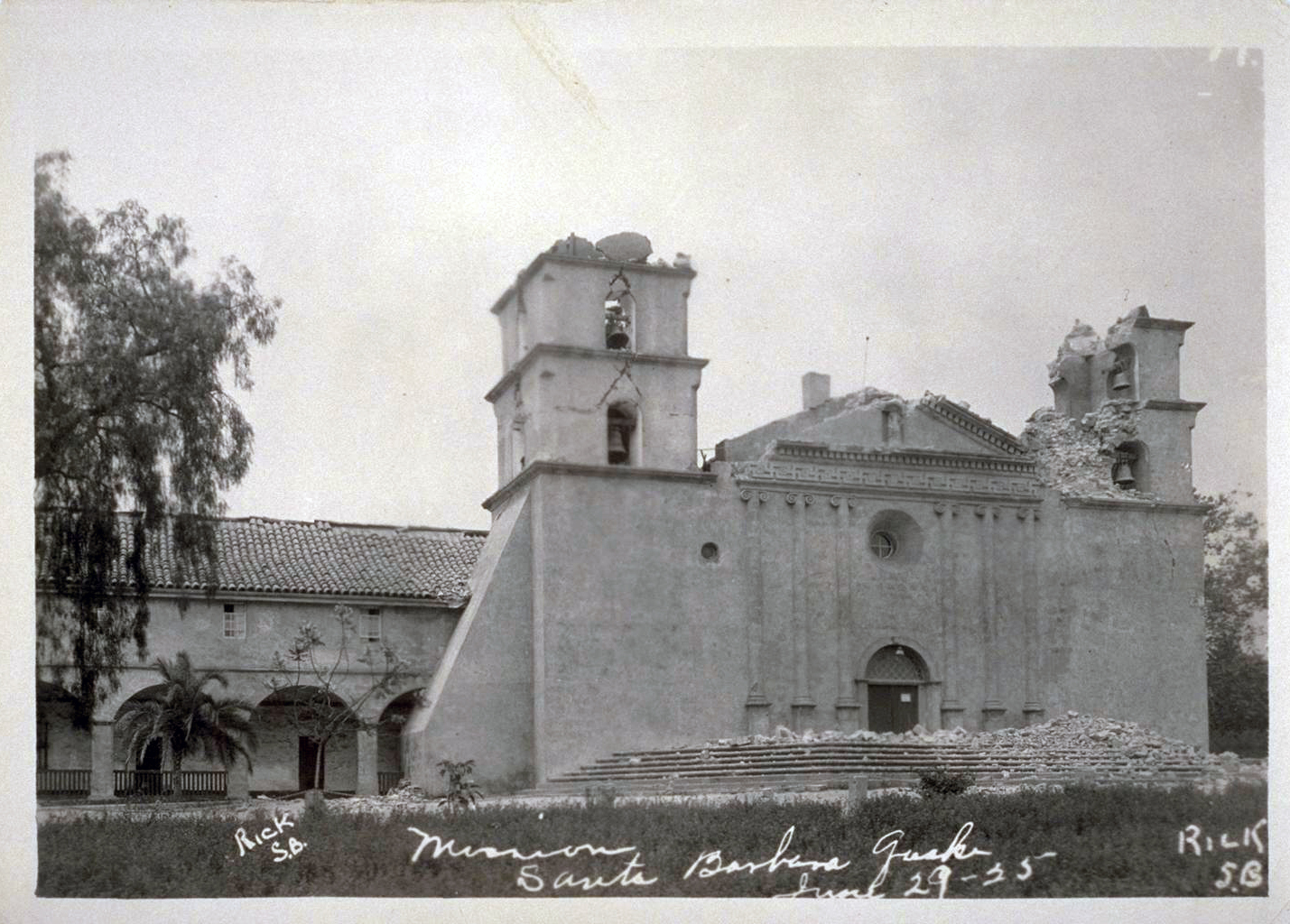
Mission Santa Barbara damaged by the earthquake

Though thirteen people died, it might have been far worse without the actions of three heroes, who shut off the town gas and electricity and prevented a catastrophic fire. Most homes survived the earthquake in relatively good condition, although nearly every chimney in the city crumbled. The downtown of Santa Barbara was destroyed. Only a few buildings along State Street, the main commercial street, remained standing after the earthquake. The City Cab building and The Californian and Arlington garages, all large and fully occupied parking structures, collapsed full with cars. Many other vehicles were crushed in the downtown area. At least one death resulted when a driver near the San Marcos building was crushed as walls of buildings fell onto cars parked there.

In the business district, an area of about 36 blocks, only a few structures were not substantially damaged, and many had to be completely demolished and rebuilt. The facade of the church of the Mission Santa Barbara was severely damaged and lost its statues. Many important buildings, including hotels, offices, and the Potter Theater, were lost. The courthouse, jail, library, schools, and churches were among the buildings sustaining serious damage. Concrete curbs buckled in almost every block in Santa Barbara. Pavement on the boulevard along the beach was displaced by about 20–36 centimeters (0.66–1.18 ft), but the pavement in the downtown generally was not damaged.

The earthen Sheffield Dam had been built near the city in 1917. It was 720 feet (220 m) long and 25 feet (7.6 m) high and held 30 million US gallons (114 million liters) of water. The soil under the dam liquefied during the earthquake and the dam collapsed. This was the only dam to fail during an earthquake in the U.S. until the Lower Van Norman Dam failed in 1971. When it burst, a wall of water swept between Voluntario Street and Alisos Street, destroying trees, cars, three houses and flooding the lower part of town to a depth of 2 feet (0.61 m).

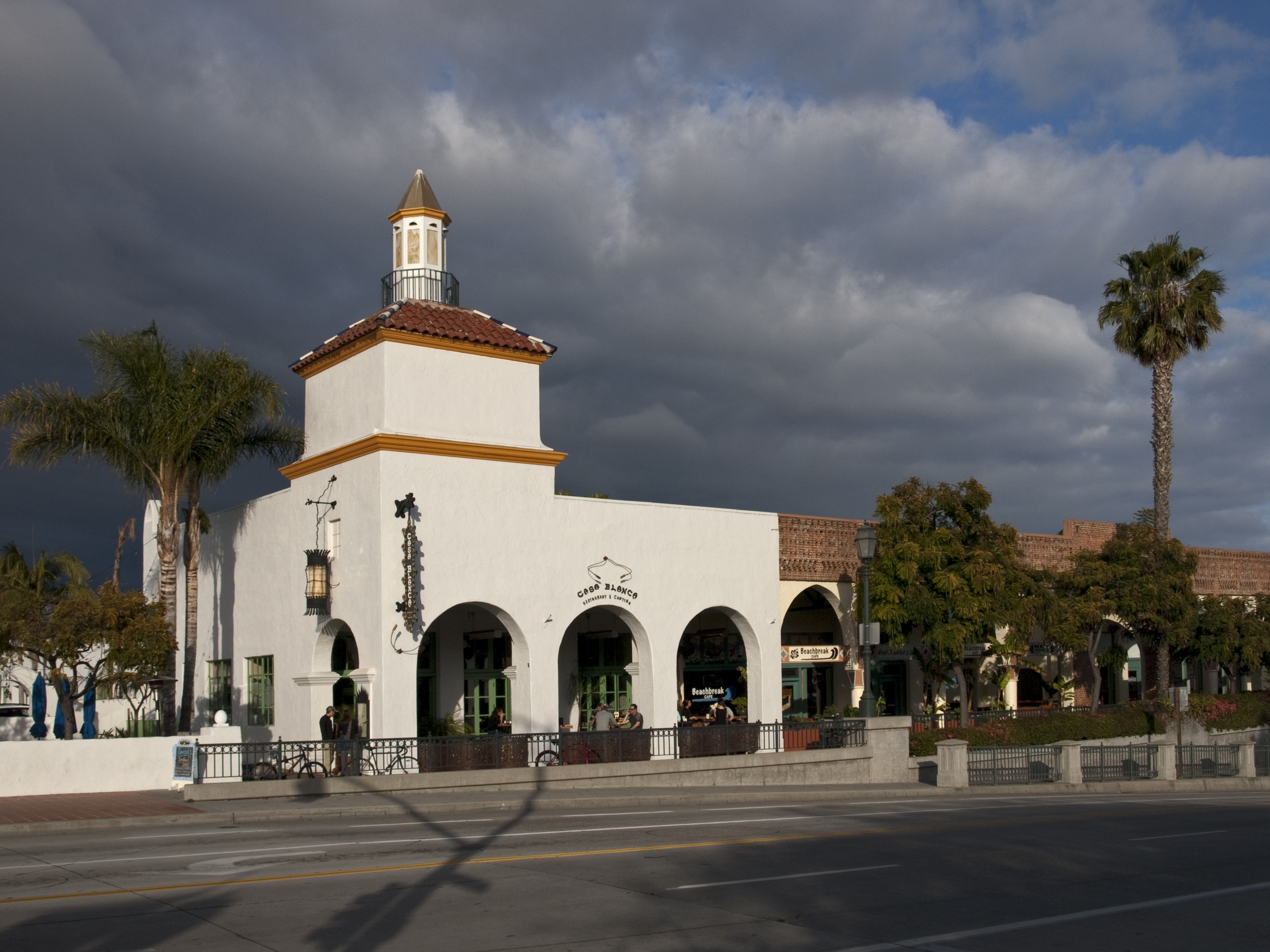
The Andalucia Building, Spanish Colonial Revival style

The Southern Pacific Company Railroad tracks were damaged in several places between Ventura and Gaviota. In particular, a portion between Naples and Santa Barbara was badly damaged and displaced. Seaside bluffs fell into the ocean, and a slight tsunami was noted by offshore ships. The town was completely cut off from telephone and telegraph, and news from the outside world arrived by shortwave radio. The absence of post-earthquake fire permitted scientists to study earthquake damage to various types of construction.

The American Legion and the Naval Reserves from the Naval Reserve Center Santa Barbara helped provide order amidst the chaos and manned posts and provided patrols throughout the town to inhibit looting of the damaged businesses and homes. Additional fire and police personnel arrived from as far as Los Angeles to assist the sailors and soldiers in maintaining order.

=== Aftershocks ===
Three strong aftershocks occurred in the next few hours, though none causing any additional damage, with events occurring at 8:08, 10:45, and 10:57 am, and many smaller shocks continued throughout the day. An aftershock on July 3 caused additional cracked walls and damaged chimneys.

== Aftermath ==
Since the downtown of Santa Barbara suffered irreparable damage, there was a large-scale construction effort in 1925 and 1926 aimed at removing or repairing damaged structures and constructing new buildings. This development completely altered the character of the city center. Before the earthquake, a considerable part of the center was built in the Moorish Revival style. After the earthquake, the decision was made to rebuild it in the Spanish Colonial Revival style. This effort was undertaken by the Santa Barbara Community Arts Association, which was founded in the beginning of the 1920s and viewed the earthquake as the opportunity to rebuild the city center in the unified architectural style.

Many architects were invited to design the building facades, among them Lionel Pries, James Osborne Craig, George Washington Smith, Carleton Winslow, Bertram Goodhue, and Winsor Soule. Pries moved his practice from San Francisco to Santa Barbara for a full year. As a result, many buildings later listed on National Register of Historic Places were designed in the late 1920s, among them the Santa Barbara County Courthouse and the front of the Andalucia Building.

Building codes in Santa Barbara were made more stringent after the earthquake demonstrated that traditional construction techniques of unreinforced concrete, brick, and masonry were unsafe and unlikely to survive strong temblors.

Almost a century later, in 2017, an AI program run by the United States Geological Survey (USGS) mistakenly sent out email alerts about the historic quake due to an engineer updating the quake's epicenter in the USGS records.

== See also ==
- List of earthquakes in 1925
- List of earthquakes in California
- List of earthquakes in the United States
- History of Santa Barbara, California
