= Mary Lund Davis =

American architect (1922–2008)

- Born: Mary Lund; February 13, 1922
- Died: June 13, 2008 (aged 86); Rancho Mirago, California
- Education: University of Washington
- Occupation: Architect
- Spouse(s): George L. Davis, Jr.
- Children: Katherine, Gail

Mary Lund Davis (1922–2008) was a 20th-century modern architect of the Pacific Northwest and one of the few women to graduate from the University of Washington School of Architecture in the 1940s.

== Early life and education ==
Mary Lund was born on February 13, 1922, to Niels Hansen and Frieda Lund. She grew up in Sacramento, California, where her father was a builder, and she began helping her father design houses at an early age. During her childhood she learned how to sail, and she would go on to win a number of races on the West Coast and elsewhere, including the 1960 Adams Cup sailboat race in Chicago, Illinois. She attended the University of Washington, where she earned a B.A. in architecture in 1945, thereby becoming the first woman to graduate from UW's School of Architecture after WWII. In later years she recalled drawing architectural plans with blackout curtains on the windows.

During her undergraduate years, she interned at several architectural firms, including Moore & Massar, Chiarelli & Kirk, and Thomas, Grainger & Thomas, experiences that helped to shape her own modernist aesthetic. She was the first woman to become a licensed architect in the state of Washington after World War II. In 1950 she married George L. Davis, Jr., who had been one of her UW classmates in architecture, after which she used her married name of Mary Lund Davis. The couple had two daughters, Katherine and Gail.

== Career ==
Davis designed both houses and small commercial buildings, with some of her work being done in partnership with her husband and other architects. In 1954, she designed an 800-square-foot cabin for herself in Fircrest; featuring prefabricated panels on post-and-beam framing, it went on to win the 1966 A.I.A.-Sunset Western Home Award. In 1962, she designed the Tacoma Millwork Supply Company Office with Alan Bucholz. She designed a house for her father-in-law that local critics saw as inspired by Frank Lloyd Wright.

In 1969–70, Davis designed a large hexagonal house for herself on Wollochet Bay near Gig Harbor with extensive gardens in a style that fuses English and Japanese landscape design aesthetics. The house features retractable sliding panels that function as room dividers and storage units that are hidden from view along an inside corridor. Davis based her design on 120-degree angles, triangles, and circles.

Davis's husband inherited a wood-milling business from his father, prompting the couple to experiment extensively with furniture design. Davis's specialty was cabinets and storage spaces, and during the 1950s she drew up build-it-yourself designs for mid-century modern furniture that circulated in booklets distributed nationwide by the Douglas Fir Plywood Association. In the late 1950s, the couple were among the earliest designers to introduce laminates into kitchen cabinets and counters.

Davis served as a board member for the Pilchuck Glass School and a trustee (emerita) for Washington's Governor’s Mansion Foundation and the Tacoma Art Museum.

Davis's husband died in 1995, and she died on June 13, 2008, in Rancho Mirage, California.

The University of Washington Libraries holds photographs of some of Davis's buildings and models in its collection of images by the architectural photographers Phyllis Dearborn and Robert Massar.
