= David Streatfield =

David Streatfield is a widely recognized historian of landscape architecture and long-time professor in the Department of Landscape Architecture at the University of Washington.

Streatfield was born and raised in England. He received his Diploma in Architecture at Brighton College of the Arts and Crafts in Brighton, Sussex, England, in 1956; he earned a Certificate in Landscape Architecture at University College, University of London, in 1962; and he earned his Master of Landscape Architecture at the University of Pennsylvania in 1966.

Streatfield taught at the University of Washington from 1971 to his retirement about 2016. He served as Chair of the Department of Landscape Architecture from 1992 to 1996. He is now a professor emeritus.

Streatfield is best known for his publications on the landscapes of the American West. His book, California Gardens: Creating A New Eden (1994) was selected in 1998 by the American Horticultural Society as one of the "75 Great American Garden Books in 75 Years" on the observance of the Society's 75th anniversary.

== Selected writings ==
- Streatfield, David, California Gardens: Creating a New Eden, Abbeville Press, New York London Paris 1994
