= Henry M. Jackson Federal Building =

37-story United States Federal Government skyscraper in downtown Seattle, Washington

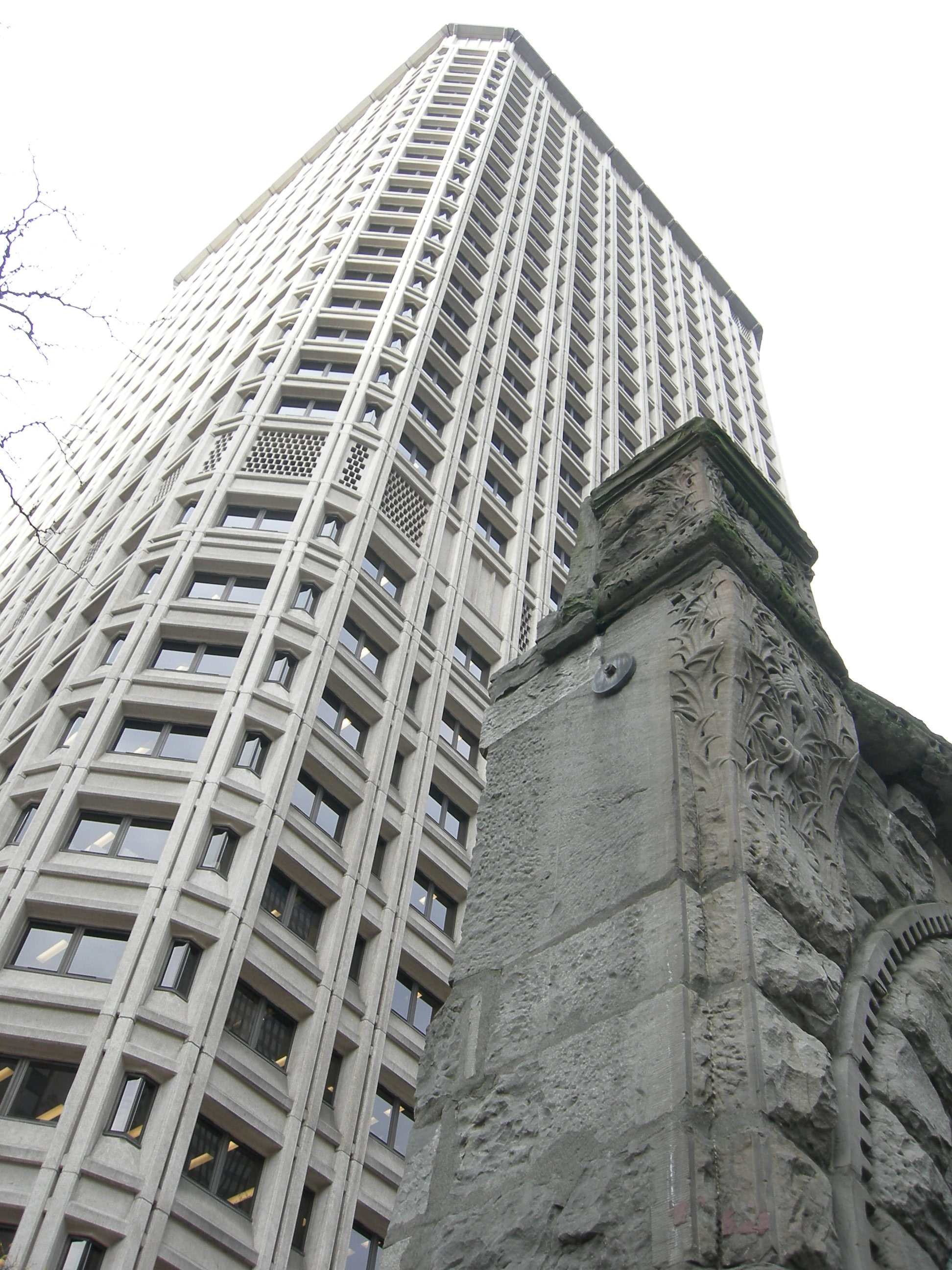
- The portal arch of the former Burke Building completed in 1891 stands in the foreground.

- Location within downtown Seattle
- Alternative names: JFB; The Federal Center

General information
- Type: Government offices
- Location: 915 Second Avenue; Seattle, Washington
- Coordinates: 47.6044°N 122.3354°W
- Construction started: 1971
- Completed: 1974

Height
- Roof: 148 m (486 ft)

Technical details
- Floor count: 37

Design and construction
- Architects: Bassetti Architects; John Graham & Company
- Structural engineer: Magnusson Klemencic Associates
- Main contractor: Hoffman Construction Company

The Henry M. Jackson Federal Building (JFB) is a 37-story United States Federal Government skyscraper in downtown Seattle, Washington. Located on the block bounded by Marion and Madison Streets and First and Second Avenues, the building was completed in 1974 and won the Honor Award of the American Institute of Architects in 1976. It received its current name after the death of U.S. Senator Henry M. Jackson in 1983. Architects for the project were Bassetti/Norton/Metler/Rekevics and John Graham & Associates. The building was listed on the National Register of Historic Places in 2024.

Among the structures torn down to build the federal building were the Richardsonian Romanesque Burke Building (built 1889–91), the Hotel Stevens, and the Rivoli Theater, a burlesque house. It is located across from the Old Federal Building.

The largest occupant of the building is a regional office of the Internal Revenue Service, alongside the U.S. Department of Veterans Affairs, and the Thirteenth U.S. Coast Guard District. It formerly served as a courthouse for the United States District Court for the Western District of Washington.

== Building history ==
In the 1970s, although Seattle already had two nearby federal buildings, the growing city needed another building to serve its citizens. Master architects John Graham & Associates and Fred Bassetti & Company, joined forces with renowned Seattle landscape architect Richard Haag to design the new federal building. John Graham is best known for the design of Seattle's Space Needle and as the innovator of revolving restaurants, which are featured in several of his designs. Fred Bassetti designed numerous landmark Seattle buildings, including the Seattle Aquarium, the Children's Zoo at Woodland Park, and many educational buildings. Haag's revolutionary landscape designs in Washington State include Seattle's Gas Works Park and the Bloedel Reserve on Bainbridge Island. Bassetti and Haag together championed the preservation of Seattle's historic Pike Place Market in the 1960s and 1970s.

Construction commenced in 1971 and was completed in 1974. The late-nineteenth-century Burke Building, which existed on the site, was demolished to construct the Jackson Building. In 1984, the building was rededicated and named to honor Henry M. "Scoop" Jackson (1912-1983), a Democratic U.S. Congressman and Senator who is best remembered for contributing to and guiding environmental legislation, including the National Environmental Policy Act of 1969. He also championed the protection and expansion of national parks and wilderness areas.

On December 3, 1997, a juvenile coyote ran into the building via its automatic doors and was trapped in an empty elevator car for over two hours. The coyote was eventually captured and released in eastern King County.

== Architecture ==
The Henry M. Jackson Federal Building is a striking 37-story tower located within the Pioneer Square Commercial Business District on the block bounded by First and Second avenues and Madison and Marion streets. The parcel of land is steep and slopes toward the waterfront and piers of Elliott Bay on Puget Sound. The site is the original location of the Romanesque Revival style Burke Building (1889-1891), which was constructed in the aftermath of the Great Seattle Fire. Local preservationists lobbied against the government's 1971 demolition of the Burke Building, which cleared the site for the new office tower. Although the project proceeded as planned, the architects incorporated architectural fragments of the landmark building into their design. Elements such as the Romanesque entry arch, which is part of the landscaped plaza on Second Avenue, represent a compromise that, though not prevalent today, was often employed in the early years of the historic preservation movement.

The footprint of the monolithic building is square; however, the corners are all clipped, resulting in a less angular form on the skyline. The steel-frame building is clad in pre-cast concrete with prominent vertical members and recessed windows that emphasize the height of the structure. Arched entrance arcades on the federal building allude to the Romanesque entry of the Burke Building. The building's elevations are symmetrical and maintain a consistent geometric rhythm. Twelve stories from the street, a band of concrete panels with honeycomb patterns adorns the building. The building has a solid concrete cornice around the top perimeter. A metal-clad hipped roof form, unusual for high-rise designs of this era, adds a decorative finish to the tower.

The interior entrance lobby features brick walls with patterned brick accents. Octagonal projecting teak light fixtures adorn the ceiling. Interior columns are covered with precast concrete panels similar to those used on the exterior. The elevator lobby walls are also clad in brick and teak strips cover the ceiling. The cafeteria entrance incorporates fragments from the Romanesque arched openings of the Burke Building. Although some open plan office space has been partitioned, the building appears much as it did upon completion in 1974.

The landscaped plaza is located along Second Avenue with stepped terraces sloping down toward First Avenue. It is clad primarily in brick with a series of steps and seating areas. Art is an integral component of the Jackson Federal Building. Isamu Noguchi's Landscape of Time (1975) is an outstanding five-piece sculptural grouping carved out of pink Japanese granite boulders. Despite its location in a busy public area, the sculpture establishes a quiet contemplative retreat that beckons those passing by to enter the space and sit amidst nature. Harold Balazs created Seattle Project (1976), an abstract welded copper sculpture. Its interlocking geometric shapes respond to the simple modernist forms of the Jackson Federal Building. Philip McCracken's cast-bronze sculpture, Freedom (1976) depicts a bird breaking free from the bars of its cage.

In 2005, the cafeteria was redesigned to improve services. The following year, a $36 million renovation to the building included seismic strengthening and mechanical system and elevator upgrades. The main entrances on First and Second avenues were modified as part of the U.S. General Services Administration's First Impressions program. The goal of the program is to improve the entrance experience of federal buildings for both tenants and visitors. On First Avenue, the project introduced a glass entry pavilion to accommodate new security features while admitting natural light into the building.

== Significant events ==
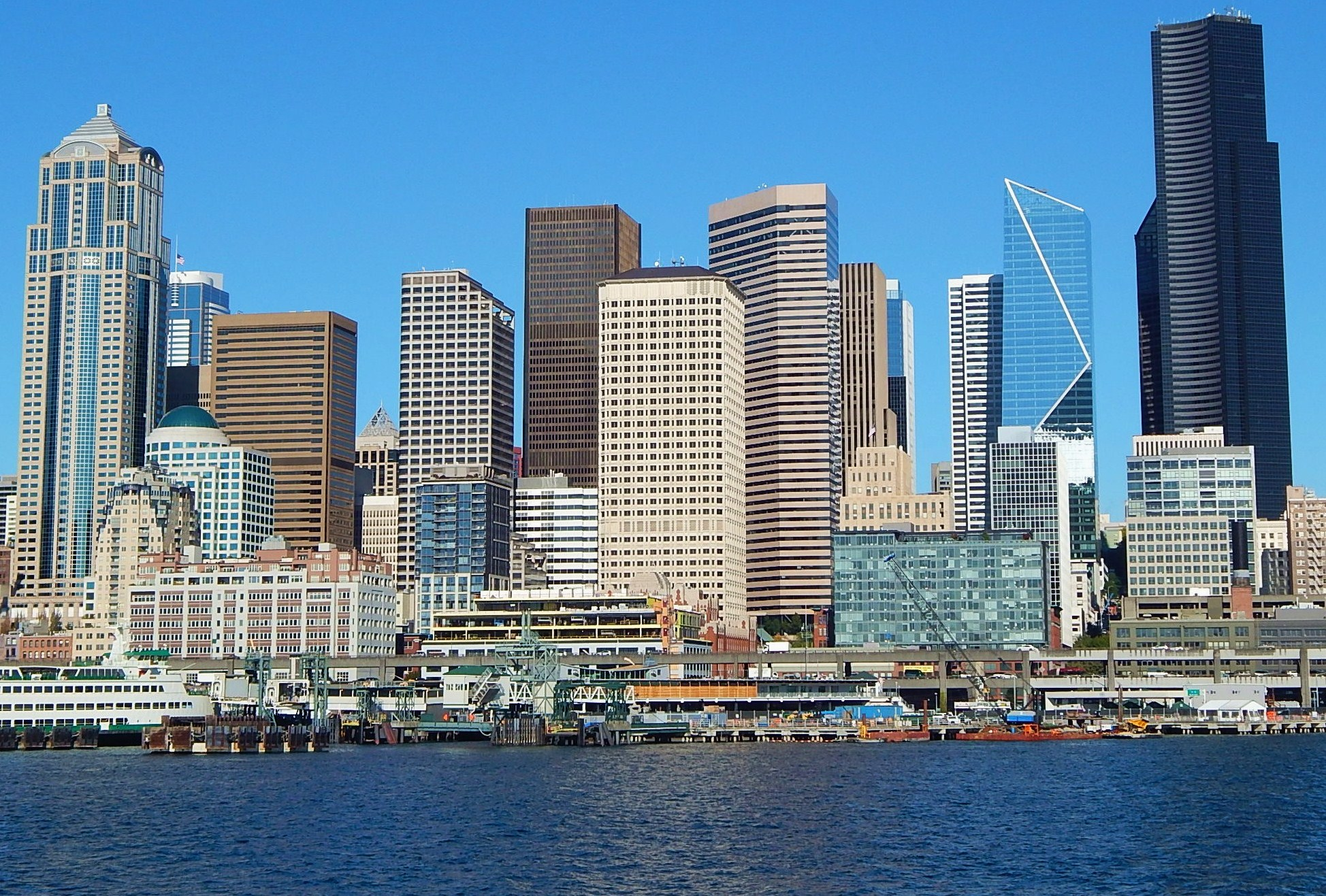
Henry Jackson Federal Building, centered

- 1971: Burke Building demolished and federal building construction commences
- 1974: Construction of federal building complete
- 1975: Landscape of Time installed
- 1976: Seattle Project installed
- 1979: Freedom installed
- 2007: Building renovations completed

== Building facts ==
- Location: 915 Second Avenue
- Architects: John Graham & Associates; Fred Bassetti & Company
- Landscape Architect: Richard Haag
- Construction Dates: 1971-1974
- Architectural Style: Seventies Modern
- Primary Materials: Concrete; brick; teak
- Prominent Features: 37-story tower; Landscaped plaza; Incorporated Romanesque Revival architectural fragments
