= Michael Pyatok =

American architect (born 1944)

Michael Pyatok FAIA (/ˈpaɪəˌtɒk/ PYE-ə-tok; born 1944) is an Oakland-based architect widely known for his expertise in the development and design of low-income and affordable housing. He has been a Fulbright Scholar in Helsinki, Finland where he studied the housing policies of Scandinavia. Harvard University appointed him a Loeb Fellow in 1983 where he used the resources of the Business School and the Kennedy School for Public Policy to explore strategies for non-profits to develop decent and affordable housing in this age of shrinking public involvement. He is co-author of Good Neighbors: The Design of Affordable Family Housing (1995).

Although his practice is based in Oakland, Pyatok was a professor of architecture at the University of Washington in Seattle from 1990 to 2003 and from 2007 to 2012. From 2003 to 2007 he headed a center devoted to housing at Arizona State University. He is now a Professor Emeritus at the University of Washington.

Pyatok was elected a Fellow in the American Institute of Architects in 1995.

== Publications ==
- Pyatok, Michael, Jones, Tom, and Pettus, William, Good Neighbors: The Design of Affordable Family Housing, McGraw-Hill, New York 1995, ISBN 0-07-032913-3
