= Astra Zarina =

American architect (1929–2008)

Astra Zarina (August 25, 1929 – August 31, 2008) was an architect and professor at the University of Washington. She was born in Riga, in Latvia. She received the Rome Prize of the American Academy in Rome in 1963.

== Awards ==
- Rome Prize, 1963
- Fulbright fellowship
