= Elizabeth Ayer =

American architect (1897–1987)

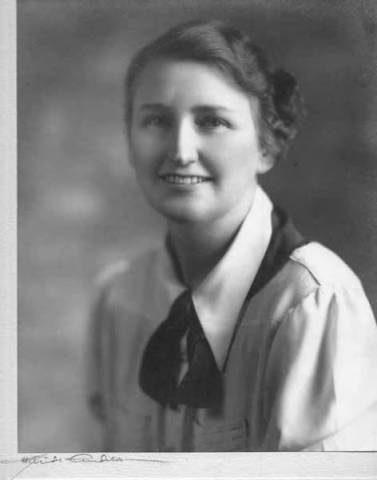
- Elizabeth Ayer in 1925
- Born: 13 October 1897; Thurston County, Washington, U.S.
- Died: 4 August 1987; Lacey, Washington, U.S.
- Education: University of Washington (B.Arch, 1921)
- Occupation: Architect
- Years active: 1918–1970
- Notable work: First woman registered as architect in Washington State (1930); Partner at Ivey & Lamping; later Ayer & Lamping
- Awards: Seattle AIA Senior Council honor, 1980

Elizabeth Ayer (October 13, 1897 – August 4, 1987) is recognized as a pioneering architect in Seattle, Washington, whose professional activities stretched over more than five decades. She was the first woman to graduate from the professional architecture program at the University of Washington and was the first woman to be registered as an architect in Washington State.

Ayer was born in Thurston County, Washington, in October 1897. She enrolled in the University of Washington in 1916, graduating in 1921 with her B.Arch. degree. In 1919, while still a student, she was hired by Andrew Willatsen. The next year, she began her long association with Seattle architect Edwin Ivey. From 1922 to 1923, she worked in New York City, but after a year returned to Seattle, again working with Ivey.

By the late 1920s, Ayer was identified as Ivey's "Associate." During the 1920s and 1930s, Ayer played key roles in design and supervision of the Ivey's residential commissions. About 1930, Ayer became registered as an architect in Washington State.

In 1940, Ivey was killed in an automobile accident. Ayer took over the firm and with another employee, Rolland Lamping, continued the practice. In 1942, they suspended the practice—for the duration of World War II Ayer worked as an architect in the U.S. Engineers Office. She restarted the practice after 1945. Some time during the 1950s, the firm name was changed to Ayer & Lamping.

Ayer retired in 1970, after a 50-year professional career. She moved to Lacey, Washington, where she served on the Planning Commission through 1980. She died in Lacey in 1987.
