= Hermann Pundt =

American historian (1928–2000)

Hermann Johannes Gustav Pundt (28 August 1928 – 17 September 2000) was a German-born American architectural historian who was a professor in the University of Washington Department of Architecture.

== Biography ==
Pundt was born and raised in Berlin, Germany. In 1944, at age 16, he began service as a naval cadet. He fought in the defense of Berlin against the Russian army in 1945. After his capture by the Russians, he escaped from a POW camp the following December. Pundt came to the United States in 1951. He was drafted to serve in the Korean War with an aerial intelligence unit of the U.S. Marine Corps. He was naturalized as a U.S. citizen in 1954.

In 1955, Pundt began the study of architectural engineering, design and history at the University of Colorado. From 1957 to 1960 he studied history of art and architecture at the University of Illinois at Urbana-Champaign, where he received his B.A. and M.A. degrees in 1960. In 1960-61 he traveled in Europe, supported by the Mary McLean Travel Scholarship. Pundt went on to Harvard University where he earned his Ph.D. with distinction from the Graduate School of Arts and Sciences in June 1969; his dissertation was supervised by Professors James S. Ackerman and Eduard F. Sekler.

From 1962 to 1968, Pundt taught at the University of Illinois, at both the Urbana and Chicago campuses. He was the founder of the Committee on Architectural Heritage, a University of Illinois student/faculty organization that fought for the preservation of Frank Lloyd Wright's Frederick Robie House. He also participated in the fight to save H. H. Richardson's John J. Glessner House in 1966.

Pundt moved to Seattle in 1968 to join the faculty of the Department of Architecture at the University of Washington. He was promoted to full Professor in 1973. He received a joint appointment in the School of Art, Division of Art History in 1976. He was also a member of the faculty of the College of Architecture & Urban Planning (now College of Built Environments) Certificate Program in Historic Preservation.

Pundt offered courses in architectural history and historic preservation. He also taught in the UW Architecture in Rome program in 1977 and 1987, and he taught at the Technische Universitat, Berlin, in 1974-75 (as a Fulbright Senior Lecturer), and at Tokyo Institute of Technology in 1982. He was an invited speaker at various schools in the U.S., Europe and Japan.

Pundt's published scholarship addressed nineteenth century Prussian architect, Karl Friedrich Schinkel (1781–1841). His publications included Schinkel’s Berlin: A Study in Environmental Planning (1972; German edition 1981; Japanese edition, 1985), and he was a principal contributor and co-author for Karl Friedrich Schinkel: Sammmlung Architektonischer Entwürfe (Collection of Architectural Designs) (1982, and subsequent editions). Through his involvement with the Committee on Architectural Heritage, he was the instigator of an exhibition and associated catalogue, Frank Lloyd Wright: Vision and Legacy (1967).

Pundt's preservation interests led to his involvement in US/ICOMOS (International Council on Monuments and Sites). Beginning in 1990, he was a member of the Gesellschaft des Wiederaufbaus der Frauenkirche, Dresden, a citizen initiative for the reconstruction of Dresden's famous Church of Our Lady, destroyed in 1945. After German reunification, he lectured and consulted on preservation projects such as the Palace and Gardens of Sanssouci in Potsdam, the Bauhaus in Dessau, and the reconstruction of historic Dresden.

In June 1996, Pundt retired after more than 35 years as a university faculty member, but continued to teach on a reduced schedule. He died on September 15, 2000, in Donauwörth, Germany.

Pundt is remembered by former students for his inspirational presentations on architecture and preservation. He was an advocate of the arts and humanities in the face of what he perceived as an increasing academic and societal emphasis on science and technology.

== Honors ==
- Karl Friedrich Schinkel Medal (1981)
- Victor Steinbrueck Chair (1983)
- Lionel Pries Teaching Award (1985)
- University of Washington Distinguished Teaching Award (1992)
- Order of Merit, First Class, of the Federal Republic of Germany (1992)
