= Phillip Jacobson =

American architect (1928–2025)

- Born: August 27, 1928; Santa Monica, California, U.S.
- Died: May 17, 2025 (aged 96); Issaquah, Washington, U.S.
- Occupation: Architect
- Practice: Partner in TRA - Architecture, Engineering, Planning Interiors

Phillip Jacobson (August 27, 1928 – May 17, 2025) was an American architect and university professor.

== Background ==
Jacobson was born on August 27, 1928, in Santa Monica, California, and moved to Seattle in 1941. Following graduation from Highline High School in 1946 he served in the U.S. Army 24th Infantry Division in the occupation of Japan. He received his first professional degree B.Arch. E. (honors) from Washington State University in 1952 and then, with a Fulbright Grant, studied urban design and planning in England at the University of Liverpool. He later was awarded a Fulbright Research Grant for study in Finland. He received his Master of Architecture (Licenciata) degree from the Finnish Institute of Technology in Helsinki.

Jacobson died on May 17, 2025, at the age of 96.

== Professional career ==
Jacobson joined the Seattle firm Young Richard Carleton and Detlie (later TRA) in 1955. He rose to become partner and for over 20 years was the firm's Design Director retiring in 1992. He also was for two years with John Carl Warnecke in San Francisco. At times the firm had branch offices in Anchorage, Boston, Denver and Las Vegas. In addition to the United States the firm was involved in the Middle East, Central America and the Pacific region.

Representative of Jacobson's projects with TRA are:

Washington State Convention and Trade Center - Seattle
State of Washington Capitol Campus - Olympia

Highway Department Administration Building
Public Assistance Department Building

King County Aquatics Center - Federal Way, Washington
Albuquerque International Airport - New Mexico
Mahlon Sweet Airport - Eugene, Oregon
Sealaska Corporation Headquarters Building - Juneau, Alaska
University of Washington - Seattle

McCarty Residence Hall
Aerospace Research Laboratory
Hitchcock Hall Biological Sciences Facility
Health Sciences GHI Wings

Washington State University - Pullman

Wegner Hall

== Academic career ==
Concurrent with his professional practice Jacobson served on the faculty of the Department of Architecture and the Department of Urban Design and Planning at the University of Washington from 1962 until 2000. During this time he offered graduate and undergraduate design studios to over a thousand students and guided over 150 master's theses. His administrative duties included the founding and direction of the Building Technology and Administration Program as well as the Graduate Program Director for several years in which he reorganized and expanded the Master of Architecture degree program. In addition he had visiting appointments in architecture teaching at The Royal Academy of Fine Arts-Copenhagen, The University of Sydney-Australia, The Tokyo Institute of Technology and The Royal Institute of Technology-Stockholm.

== Civic Activities ==
Jacobson had served on the boards of trustees for Pilchuck Glass School, Northwest Seaport, Northwest Trek Foundation, AIA Seattle, Seattle Architectural Foundation, Northwest Institute for Architecture and Urban Studies in Italy and the Seattle Landmark Preservation Board. He also has served as AIA Seattle Senior Council president and as president of the Washington State Council of Architects.

== Related Activities ==
Jacobson was involved in product design including the design of furniture, lighting fixtures, jewelry and serving pieces. These endeavors and his art photography have been exhibited in the Pacific Northwest and in Italy.

Jacobson was honored with Knight First Class Order of the White Rose of Finland, the Silver Award from the Finnish Association of Architects, AIA Seattle Medal of Honor, American Institute of Architects Fellowship, Sigma Tau Outstanding Alumnus- WSU, Washington State University Alumni Achievement Award and membership in six university scholastic honorary societies.
