= Paul Hayden Kirk =

American architect (1914 - 1995)

- Born: 18 November 1914; Salt Lake City, Utah
- Died: 22 May 1995 (aged 80); Kirkland, Washington
- Education: University of Washington
- Occupation: Architect

University Unitarian Church, Seattle, designed by Kirk and built 1955-1959.

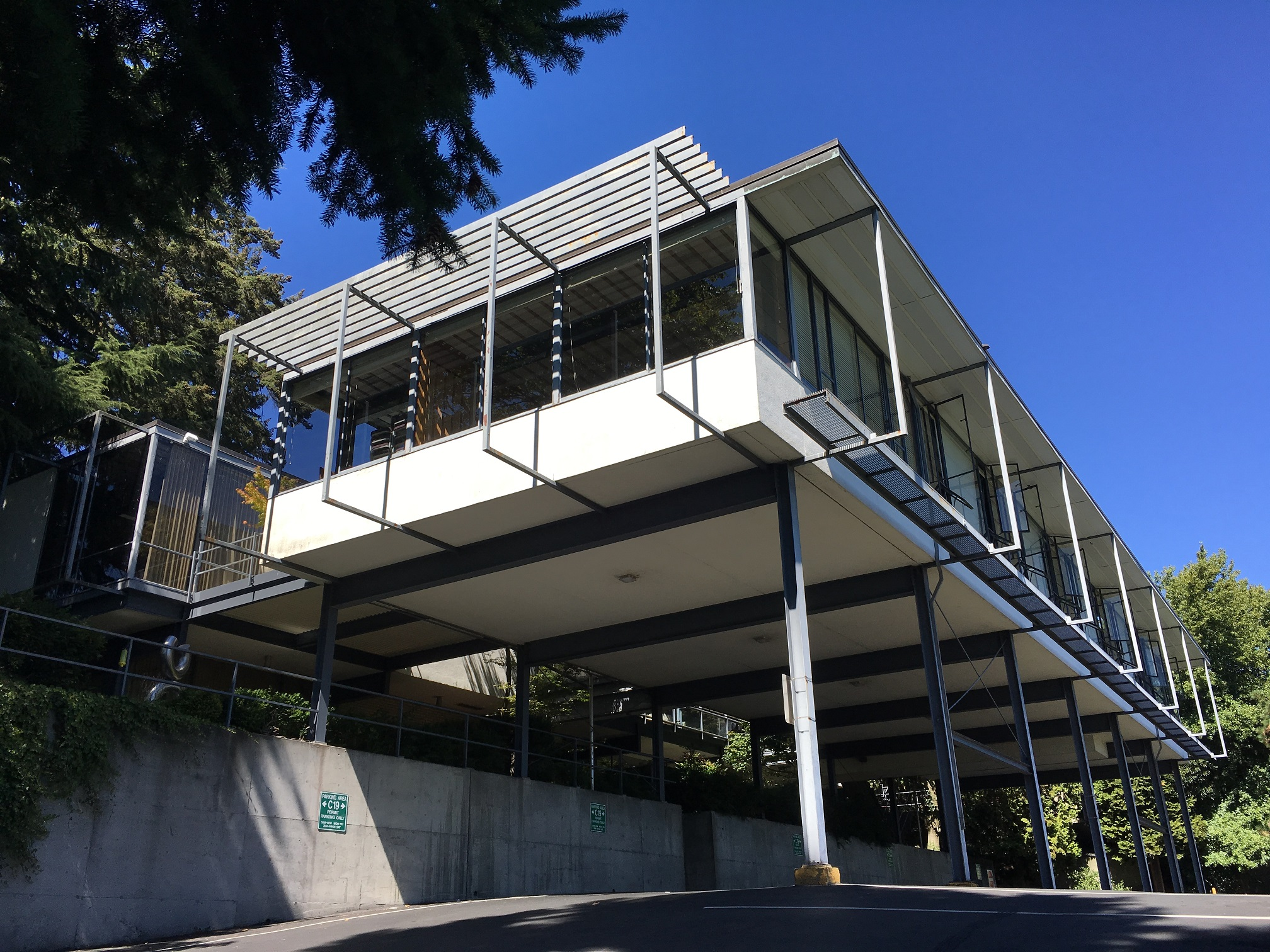
University of Washington Faculty Club, co-designed by Kirk and Victor Steinbrueck, constructed 1958-1960.

Paul Hayden Kirk (18 November 1914 – 22 May 1995) was a Pacific Northwest architect. Paul Kirk's designs contributed to development of a regionally appropriate version of Modern architecture. Many of his buildings are as much appreciated today as they were at the time they were built.

Born in Salt Lake City, Utah in 1914, Paul Hayden Kirk arrived in Seattle at the age of eight, graduating from Roosevelt High School in 1932. During his childhood Kirk suffered from polio which left him permanently disabled. His use of one of his arms was limited, he walked with a limp, and he sometimes used a crutch.

After receiving his architecture degree from the University of Washington in 1937, Kirk worked for a variety of architects including Floyd Naramore, A.M. Young, B. Dudley Stuart, and Henry Bittman. Kirk then started his own practice in 1939 and began designing homes for his older brother, Blair Kirk, a building contractor.

Early tendencies toward simplified forms and details emerged in Kirk's early design for a speculative housing development on Columbia Ridge where limited materials and budget necessitated a more functional solution. During World War II, Kirk joined with other architects to take advantage of war contracts, partnering with former employer B. Dudley Stuart and Robert L. Durham. After the war, Kirk established a partnership with architect James J. Chiarelli in 1944. The firm of Chiarelli & Kirk produced a variety of Modernist structures such as the Crown Hill Medical-Dental Clinic in Seattle (1947), the Hammack House in North Edmonds (1946), the Dr. Schueler House (1947) in Port Angeles, a variety of buildings at Camp Nor’wester (1946–62) on Lopez Island, the Lakewood Community Church (1949), and homes in Bellevue’s Norwood Village (1951).

From 1950 to 1957 Kirk worked again as sole practitioner. During this time, his designs for single-family residences displayed characteristics of the International style with flat roofs, bands of windows, and simple cubic shapes. Noteworthy examples include the Lewis Dowell House (1954) in Seattle, the George Tavernites House (1952) in Seattle, and the Lake City Clinic (1952). Eventually, Kirk dismissed the International style “as an architecture which has been imposed on the land by man.”

During the 1950s Kirk's projects displayed an increasing tendency towards complex structural detailing, often with exposed layers of wood framing. This is visible in his designs for the Group Heath Cooperative Northgate Clinic (1958), the Blakeley Clinic (1957), and the University Unitarian Church (1959). Many of Kirk’s residential work during this time gained national attention. Among them was the Frank Gilbert House (1957) in the Highlands, the Bowman House (1956) in Kirkland and the Evans House (1956) on Mercer Island. In 1957, several of his projects were selected by a jury for House and Garden magazine to receive four of five national design awards. Other work was featured in Sunset Magazine and McCall’s Book of Modern Houses.

As accolades came in, business increased for the firm. In 1957, he established Paul Hayden Kirk & Associates. Three years later, after promoting Donald S. Wallace, and David A. McKinley to partnership level, the firm was reorganized as Kirk, Wallace, McKinley & Associates. In 1960, in association with Victor Steinbrueck, he designed the University of Washington Faculty Center (later known as the UW Faculty Club), honored with design awards from AIA Washington and the American Institute of Steel Construction and published in Progressive Architecture and Steel Construction Digest. Projects from this period also include the Magnolia Branch, Seattle Public Library (1963), the Japanese Presbyterian Church (1963), the French Administration Building at Washington State University (1967), Edmond Meany Hall at University of Washington (1974), the IBM Office Building (1965) in Spokane, and the Alexander Graham Bell Elementary School (1967) in Kirkland.

Kirk’s work was widely published. Between 1945 and 1970, his designs were included in over sixty articles in various national architectural publications. His work was respected both locally and nationally, which led to Kirk’s election as a Fellow of the AIA in 1959. In 1976 he was elected into the National Academy of Design as an Associate member and became a full Academician in 1994.

Kirk was also active in civic affairs in Seattle. Throughout his career he served as a frequent juror of professional design competitions. He was appointed to the City of Seattle Housing Board; served as president of the Seattle Art Museum's Contemporary Arts Council; served as president of the Seattle Chapter of the AIA; and was a trustee on the boards of the Arboretum Foundation and the Bloedel Reserve. With architect John Morse, he authored a plan to purchase and rehabilitate buildings in the Pike Place Market as a city facility in 1969, a step that led to the Market's eventual preservation.

Paul Hayden Kirk retired from practice and transferred his firm to partner David McKinley in 1979. He died in Kirkland on May 22, 1995.
