= Wendell Lovett =

American architect and designer (1922– 2016)

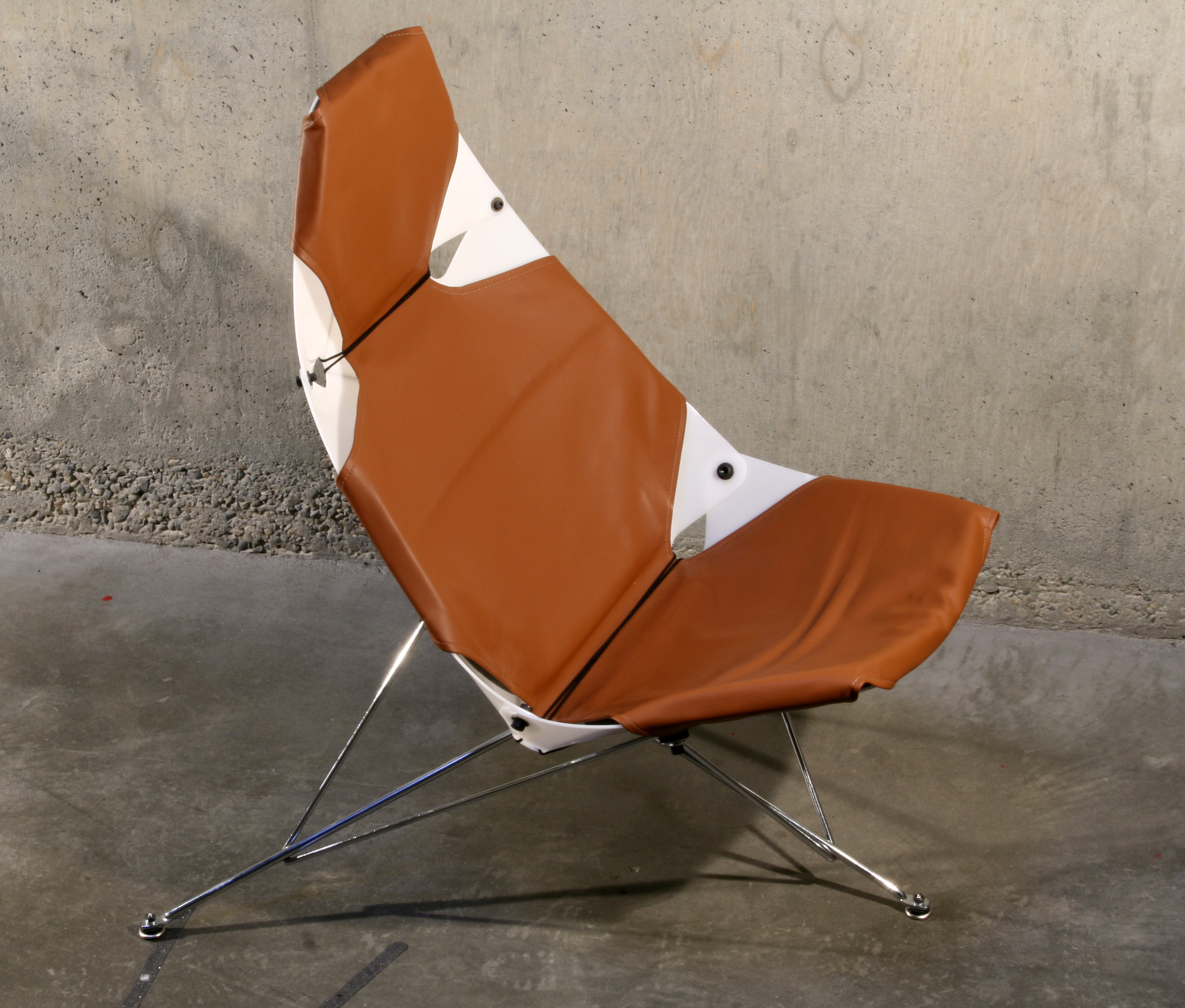
Bikini chair, 1949 designed by Wendell Lovett

Wendell Harper Lovett (April 2, 1922 – September 18, 2016) was a Pacific Northwest architect and teacher.

Born and raised in Seattle, Washington, Lovett entered the University of Washington program in architecture in 1940, but his college years were interrupted by wartime service. He graduated from the University of Washington with a B.Arch in 1947. While at Washington, he was significantly influenced by Professor Lionel Pries. Lovett attended MIT for one year, studying under Alvar Aalto and receiving his M.Arch. in June 1948. He returned to Seattle and after a brief apprenticeship and opened his own practice.

Lovett joined the University of Washington architecture faculty in 1948, as an instructor. He served as an assistant professor, 1951–60; associate professor, 1960–65; and professor, 1965–1984; although he retired in 1984, he continued to teach until about 1990. Lovett was a guest professor at the Technical University in Stuttgart, Germany, in 1959–60. He was a professor emeritus from 1984 until his death.

Lovett was the designer of many significant Pacific Northwest houses, including the house he designed for Charles Simonyi, in Medina, Washington. Begun in 1987, the house has been expanded twice to Lovett's design. The house not only serves as a residence but is also designed for display of Simonyi's collection of paintings by Victor Vasarely and Roy Lichtenstein. Lovett also designed a notable cabin on Crane Island in 1969 and his own personal residence in Madrona, Seattle in the early 1980s.

Lovett was elected a Fellow of the American Institute of Architects in 1985. He received the AIA Seattle Chapter Medal in 1993.
