= Roland Terry =

American architect

- Born: June 2, 1917; Seattle, Washington
- Died: June 8, 2006 (aged 89); Mount Vernon, Washington
- Education: University of Washington
- Occupation: Architect
- Practice: Roland Terry & Associates
- Buildings: Canlis, Nordstrom flagship store, Sun Mountain Lodge

Roland Terry (June 2, 1917 - June 8, 2006) was a Pacific Northwest architect from the 1950s to the 1990s. He was a prime contributor to the regional approach to Modern architecture created in the Northwest in the post-World War II era.

Terry was born in Seattle and raised in Seattle and Kansas. He entered the architecture program at the University of Washington program in architecture in 1935; although he effectively completed the five-year program to earn his B.Arch. by 1940, the degree was not awarded for some years because he was short a few credits. During his years at Washington he benefited from the mentorship of faculty member Lionel Pries.

In 1941, Terry won an American Institute of Architects (AIA) Langley Scholarship which allowed him to tour South America and see many examples of the region's early Modern buildings. From 1942 to 1946, Terry served in the military.

On Terry's return to Seattle, he joined University of Washington classmates Bert A. Tucker and Robert M. Shields to form Tucker, Shields & Terry. The firm designed custom houses, restaurants and other small buildings, usually in wood and other natural materials, and began to emerge as leaders in Northwest regional Modern architecture. Terry left the partnership in 1949 to study painting in Paris. The firm continued as Tucker & Shields.

In 1950, Tucker, Shields & Terry and Wimberly & Cook were hired to design the Seattle restaurant Canlis. Updates and alterations were later designed by Tucker & Shields, and then by Terry & Moore. The building is considered a Seattle landmark.

In 1952, Terry joined Philip A. Moore to form Terry & Moore, a new firm based in Seattle. Terry & Moore executed a large number of houses, often including significant landscape design and interior design, usually in collaboration with emerging designers in those professions.

Following on in 1960, Terry opened his own practice as Roland Terry & Associates and continued to design notable houses and other structures, as well as restaurants and other interiors in Seattle, San Francisco and Honolulu. Terry took his longtime associate, Robert H. Egan into partnership in 1974 forming Terry & Egan, a partnership that endured until 1987.

Terry was elected a Fellow in the American Institute of Architects in 1980; he received the AIA Seattle Chapter Medal in 1991, the highest award given by the chapter.

In his later years, Terry lived quietly at his property near Mount Vernon, Washington. He died on June 8, 2006.
