= Victor Steinbrueck =

American architect (1911–1985)

- Steinbrueck in 1984
- Born: Victor Eugene Steinbrueck; December 15, 1911; Mandan, North Dakota, U.S.
- Died: February 14, 1985 (aged 73); Seattle, Washington, U.S.
- Education: University of Washington College of Architecture
- Occupation: Architect
- Children: 4, including Peter
- Awards: American Institute of Architects Fellow
- Practice: John Graham & Company
- Buildings: Space Needle
- Projects: Pioneer Square and Pike Place Market preservation

Victor Eugene Steinbrueck (December 15, 1911 – February 14, 1985) was an American architect, best known for his efforts to preserve Seattle's Pioneer Square and Pike Place Market. He authored several books and was also a University of Washington faculty member.

== Biography ==
Steinbrueck was born in Mandan, North Dakota in late 1911, and moved to Seattle in 1913. He graduated from Franklin High School (Seattle) and then, in 1930 he enrolled in the University of Washington Program in Architecture, graduating in 1935 with a Bachelor of Architecture (B.Arch.). In this period he also worked in the Civilian Conservation Corps. After apprenticing at a number of private firms in Seattle and serving in the military during World War II, he joined the Faculty of Architecture at the University of Washington in 1946. He also initiated his own practice and, over the next two decades, designed a series of regional-modernist residences, built with indigenous materials suited to the climate.

Steinbrueck's focus on the character of Seattle's architecture and urban places dates from the early 1950s when he authored A Guide to Seattle Architecture, which was published for the American Institute of Architects' national convention held in Seattle in 1953. Steinbrueck went on to publish several other books promoting awareness of the city's unique character: Seattle Cityscape (1962; published to coincide with Century 21, the Seattle World's Fair), Market Sketchbook (1968), and Seattle Cityscape #2 (1973).

In the 1960s, Steinbrueck became active in historic preservation. Alongside others he successfully fought developers' plans to obliterate Seattle's most significant historic district. He was instrumental in the creation of Seattle's first two historic districts, Pioneer Square (1970) and Pike Place Market (1971). Steinbrueck's projects were guided by a strong sense of public spirit and social consciousness: low-income housing, the inclusion of social services, and a number of city parks co-designed with landscape architect Richard Haag, including the one that now bears his name.

Working as a consultant to John Graham & Company, Steinbrueck played a key role in the design work of the Space Needle, inspired by a wooden sculpture in his home by David Lemon called The Feminine One, which emulates the shape of a female dancer in motion and giving the tower's support structure its shape. As indicated in the documentary, Space Needle: A Hidden History, Steinbrueck's son, Peter, believes attraction to the form stemmed from Steinbrueck's personal relationship with dancer Syvilla Fort. In 1963, Steinbrueck was elected a Fellow in the American Institute of Architects.

Steinbrueck had four children by his first marriage; his son Peter also became an architect; Peter Steinbrueck served as a City Council member (1997–2007) and as a Seattle Port Commissioner (2018–2022). Victor Steinbrueck died at Seattle's University Hospital on February 14, 1985, at the age of 73 during an operation following a heart attack.

== Publications ==
- Steinbrueck, Victor, A Guide to Seattle Architecture, 1850-1953, Reinhold Publishing Co., New York 1953.
- Steinbrueck, Victor, Seattle Cityscape, University of Washington Press, Seattle 1962
- Steinbrueck, Victor, Market Sketchbook, University of Washington Press, Seattle 1968
- Steinbrueck, Victor, Seattle Cityscape #2, University of Washington Press, Seattle and London 1973
- Steinbrueck, Victor, and Nyberg, Folke, A Visual Inventory of Buildings and Urban Design Resources for Seattle, Washington, Historic Seattle Preservation and Development Authority, Seattle 1975–77. Available from Historic Seattle

== See also ==
- Victor Steinbrueck Park
