= Seventh Church of Christ, Scientist (Seattle) =

Building in Seattle, Washington, U.S.

Coordinates: 47°38′32″N 122°22′05″W

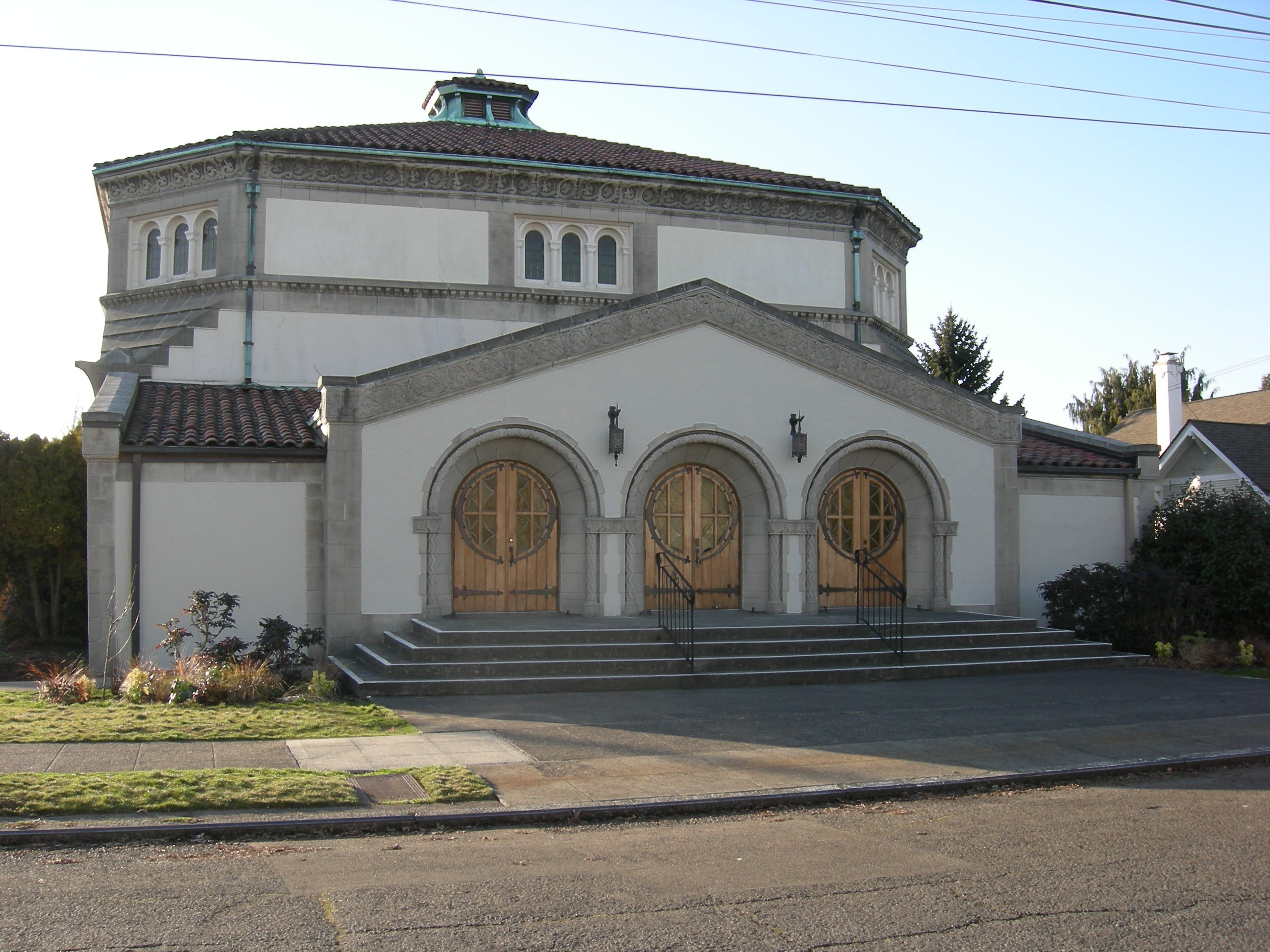
- Seventh Church of Christ, Scientist

General information
- Architectural style: Neo-Byzantine, Mission Revival and Spanish Colonial
- Location: Seattle, Washington, United States
- Completed: 1926
- Client: Seventh Church of Christ, Scientist

Design and construction
- Architects: Harlan Thomas of Thomas, Grainger and Thomas

The former Seventh Church of Christ, Scientist building, located in the Queen Anne Hill neighborhood of Seattle, Washington at the corner of 8th Avenue W and W Halladay Street, is an historic Christian Science church edifice. Built in 1926, it was designed by noted Seattle architect Harlan Thomas in the Neo-Byzantine, Mission Revival and Spanish Colonial styles. It consists of two parts joined together to form an ell: the 2-story main section containing the church auditorium (the term Christian Scientists use instead of sanctuary) and a one-story wing containing the Sunday School. The main section is square but each corner has been "flattened to form an irregular octagon.

== Recent history ==
Due to declining membership and increased costs of maintaining the property, Seventh Church decided to sell the property in the late 1980s, but had no offers until 2006 when a developer offered to buy the property for redevelopment if the church could obtain a demolition permit from the city. The city did issue the permit in February 2007, but when neighbors appealed, a hearing examiner sent the permit back for further review. The property was then put on the Washington Trust for Historic Preservation's list of Most Endangered Historic Properties and the Queen Anne Historical Society spearheaded community efforts to find a buyer willing to preserve the property. The Seattle Church of Christ, a congregation of approximately 270, had looked at the property previously but had felt the then $2 million plus price was out its reach. With the price reduced to $1.6 million and Seventh Church agreeing to take a low down payment and to provide short term financing, Seattle Church of Christ was able to close on the property on August 31, 2007.

Seventh Church of Christ, Scientist is now located at 1261 Madison Street in Seattle. Seattle Church of Christ has made short term improvements to shore up the property and has long range plans to restore it.

== See also ==
- List of former Christian Science churches, societies and buildings

== Gallery ==
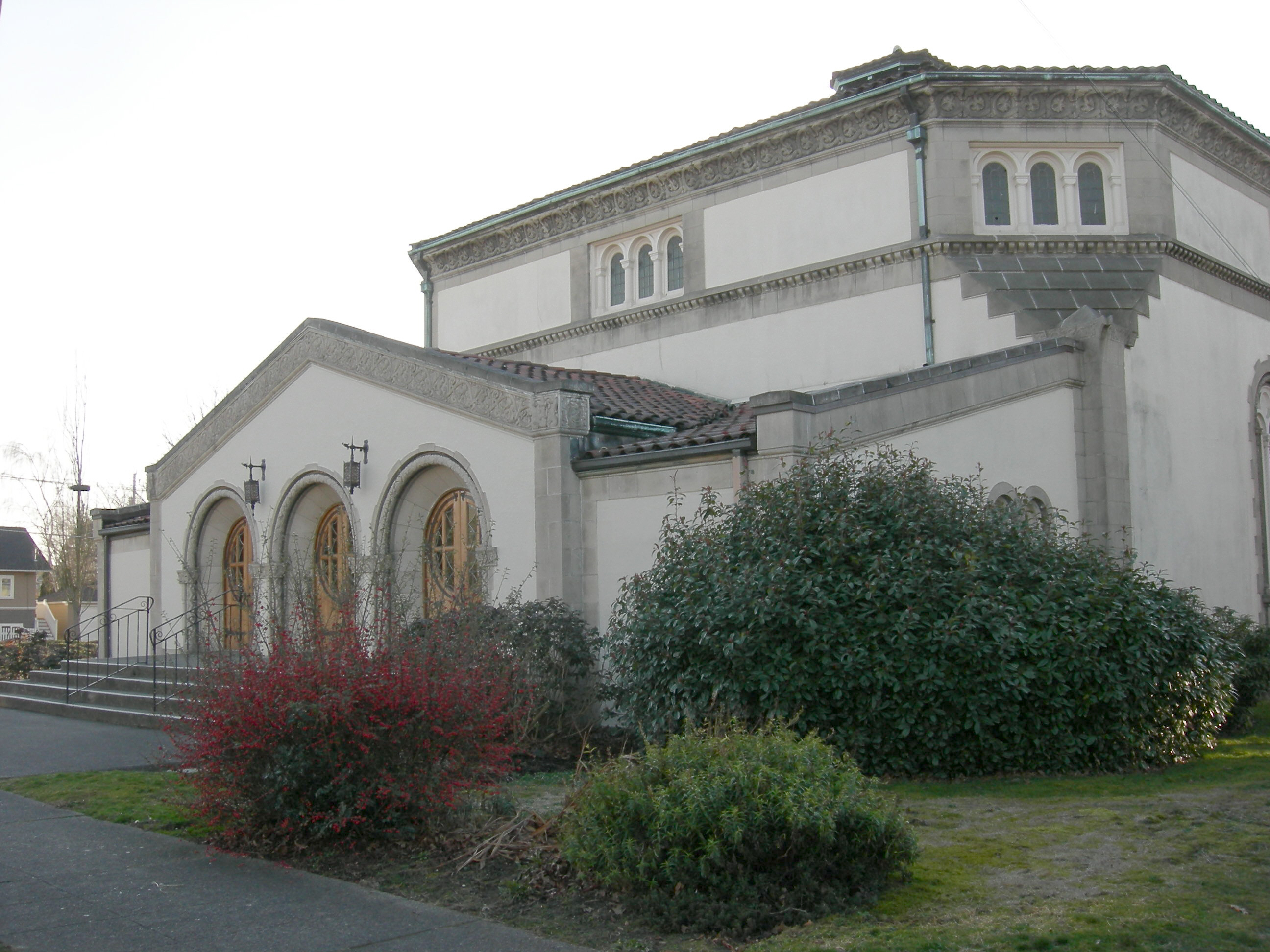
Front and right side showing irregular octagon on upper level

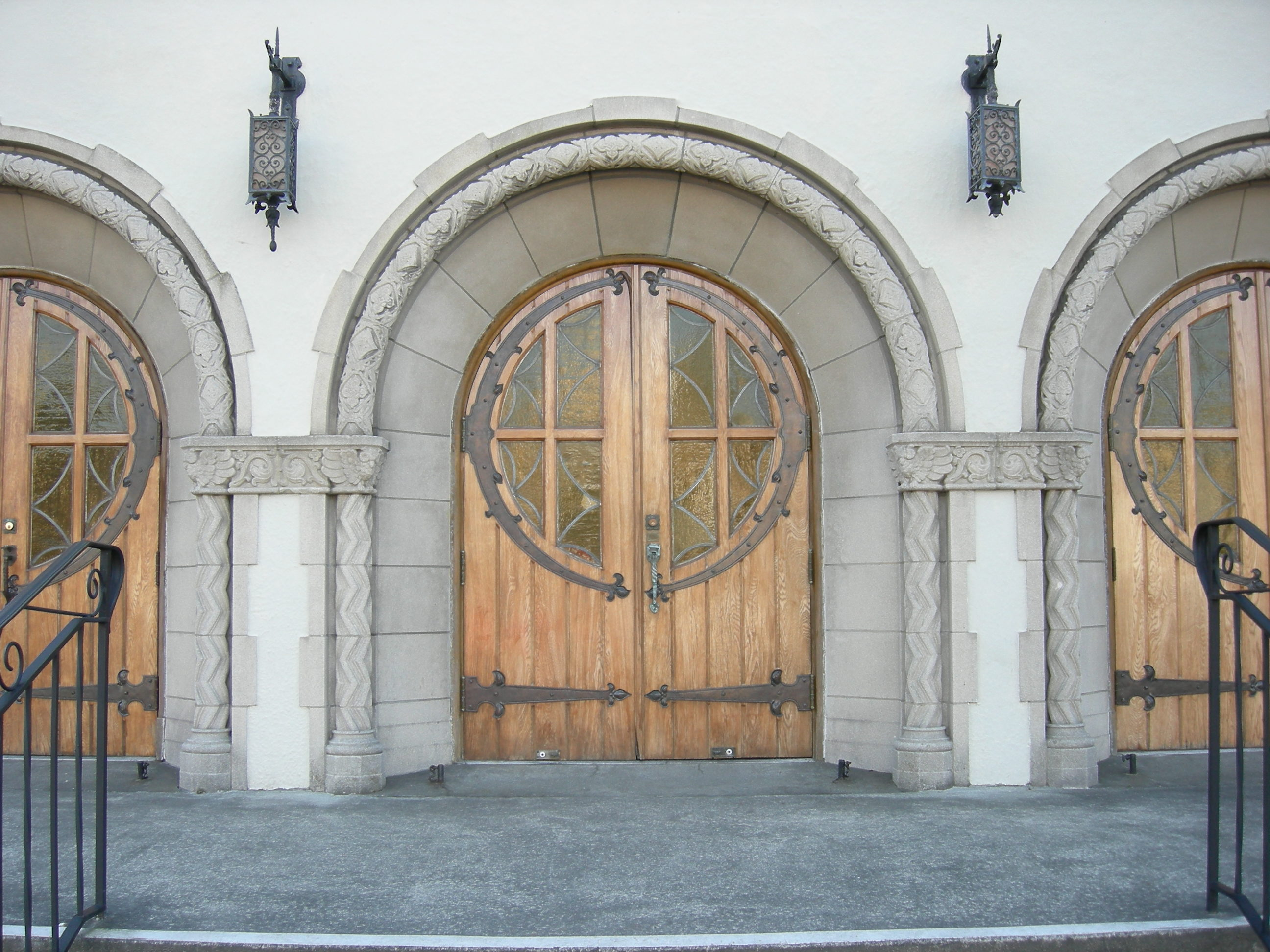
Front doors showing detail

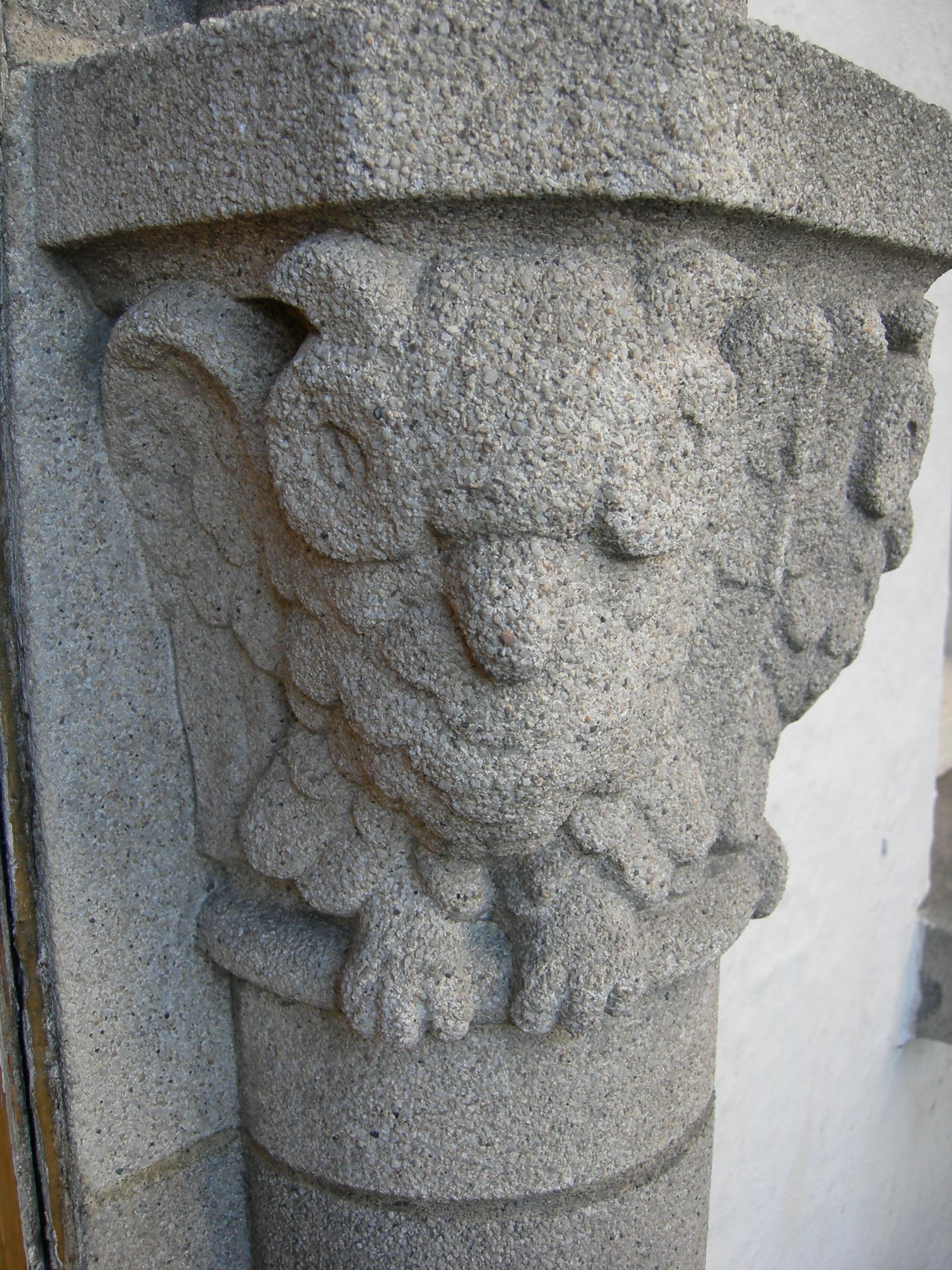
Stonework detail
