= Trolley Hill Park =

Park in Seattle, Washington, U.S.

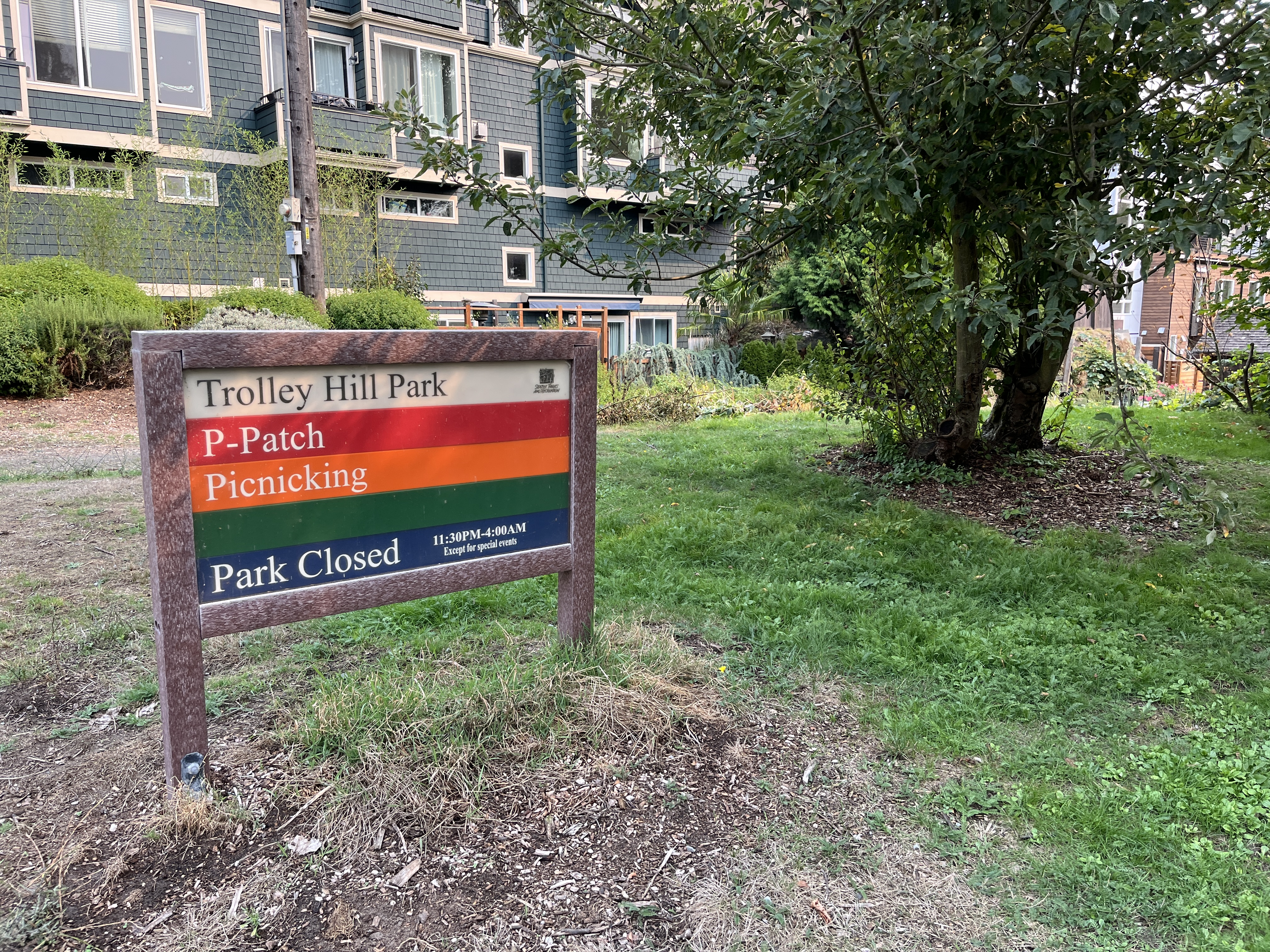
- Park sign, 2024
- Interactive map of Trolley Hill Park
- Coordinates: 47.6350°N 122.3468°W
- Operator: Seattle Parks and Recreation

Trolley Hill Park is a public park in Seattle's Queen Anne neighborhood, in the U.S. state of Washington. The park's name refers to a streetcar line that once ran along 5th Avenue N. One entrance to the park has two stone pillars with wood carvings. There is also a P-Patch community garden.

The park connects to the Northeast Queen Anne Greenbelt.

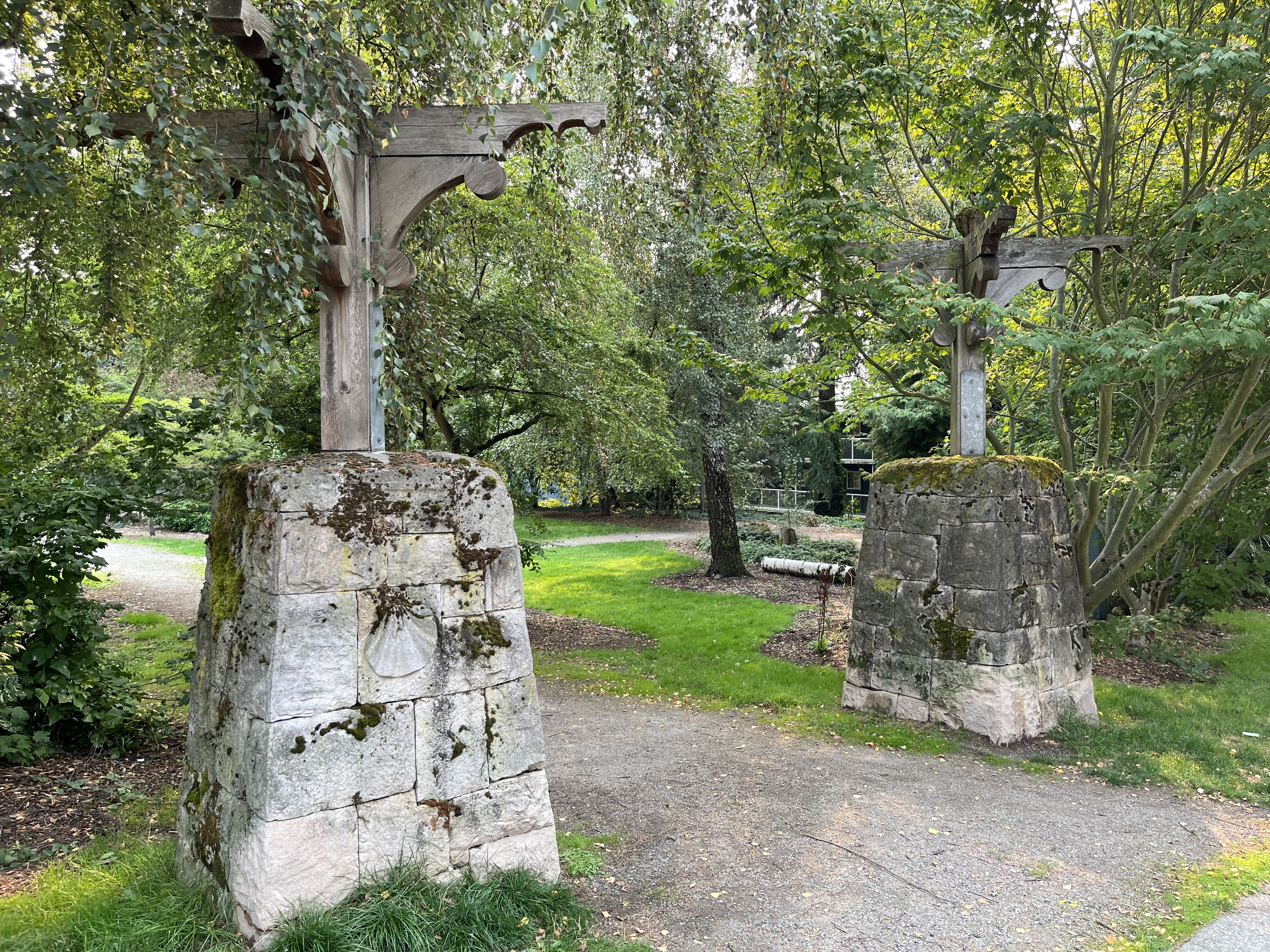
Stone pillars

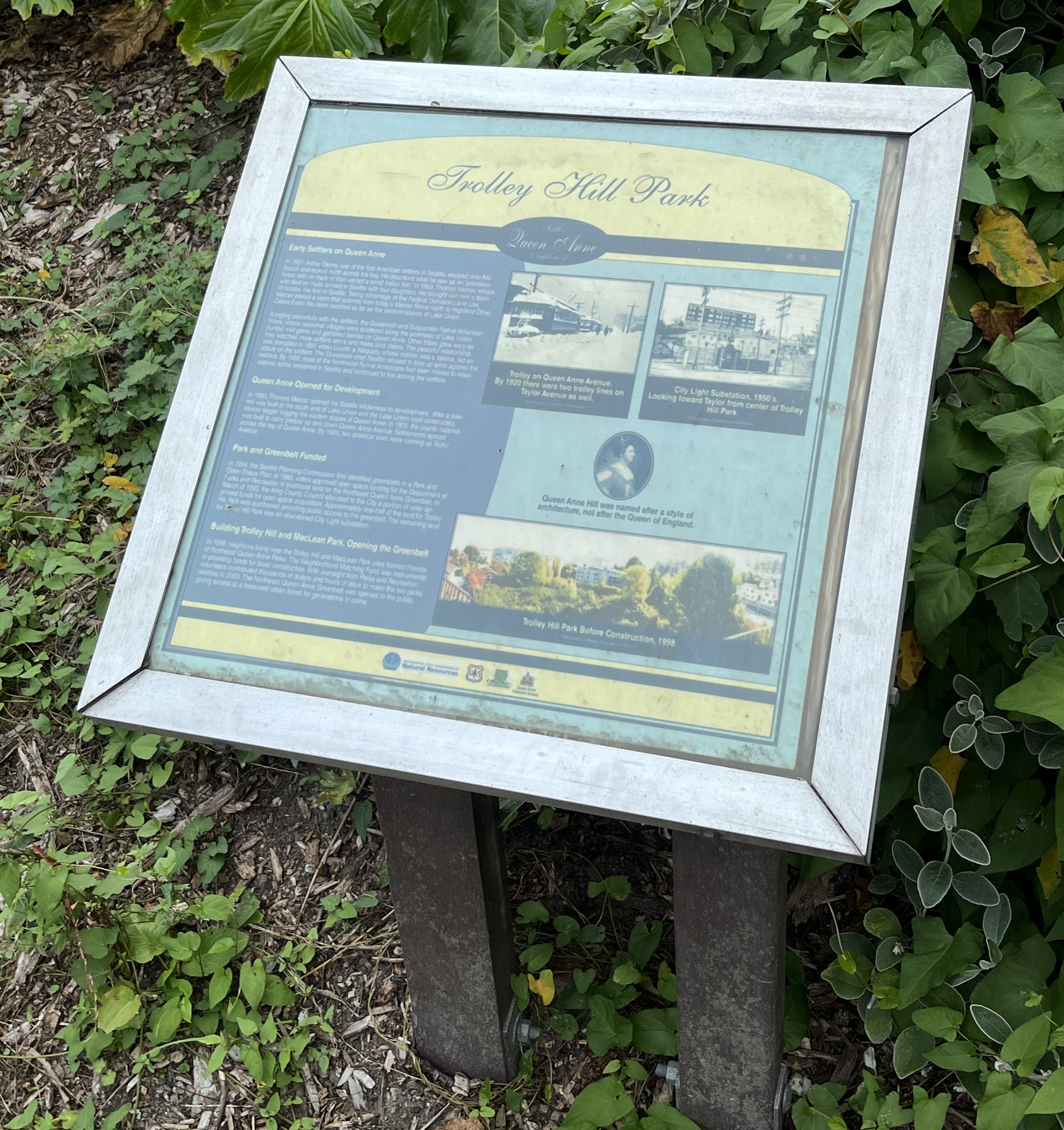
Sign about the park

== See also ==
- List of parks in Seattle
