= MacLean Park =

Public park in Seattle, Washington, U.S.

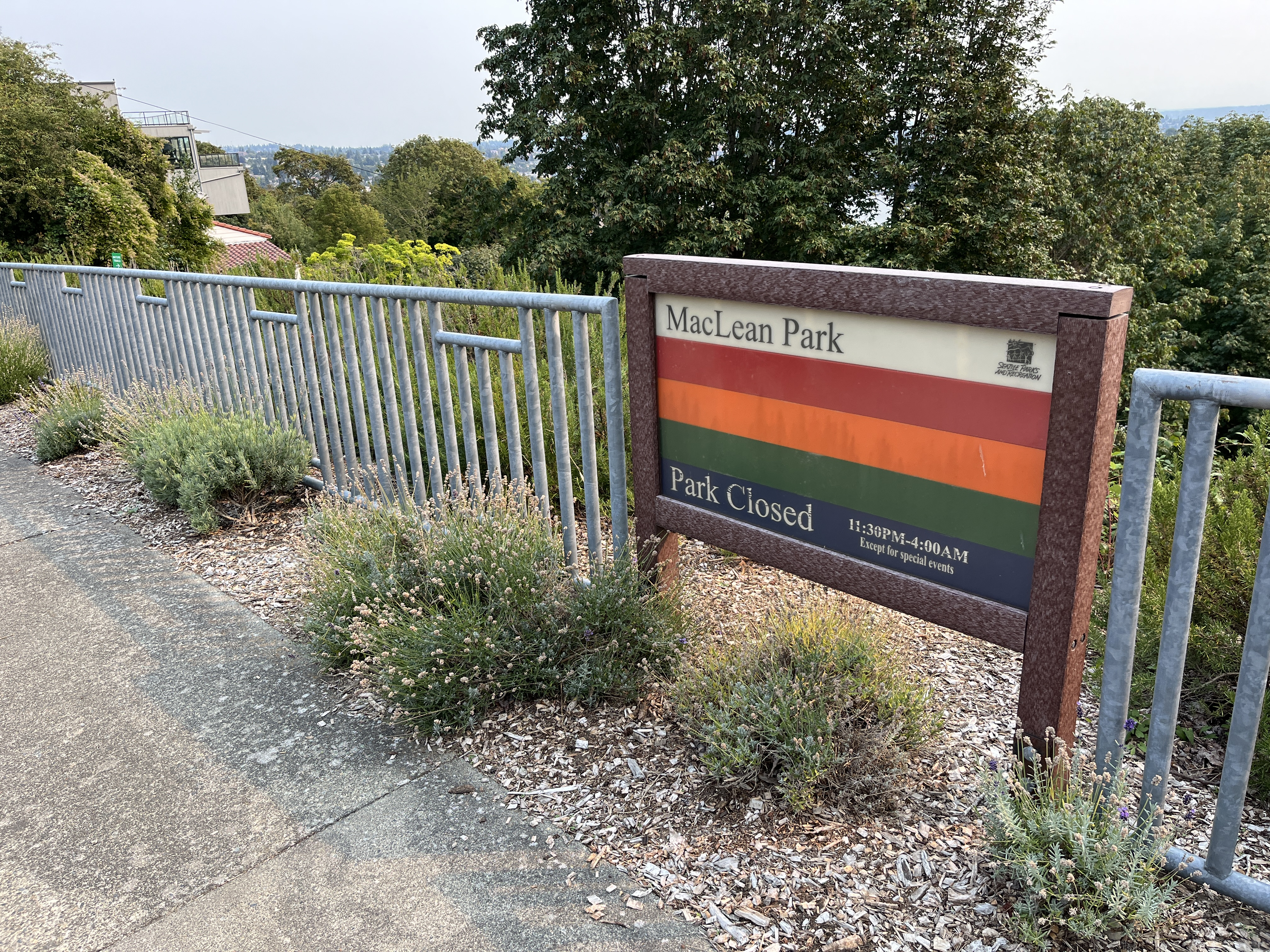
- Park sign, 2024
- Interactive map of MacLean Park
- Location: Seattle, Washington, U.S.
- Coordinates: 47.6363°N 122.3454°W

MacLean Park is a public park in Seattle's Queen Anne neighborhood, in the U.S. state of Washington. The park has benches facing Lake Union, and also offers views of the Cascades, Gas Works Park, and the Puget Sound. There is a trail leading down from Taylor Avenue. The park connects to the Northeast Queen Anne Greenbelt.

MacLean Park has been cleaned multiple times by the volunteer group We Heart Seattle. Neighbors have also formed Friends of MacLean Park, which hosts cleanups and walks, and "collaborates with the City and non-profits to ensure that individuals in the Greenbelt are provided necessary outreach".

== See also ==
- List of parks in Seattle
