= Liggett Building =

Liggett Building may refer to:

- The Liggett Building (Seattle, Washington), a 1927 building listed on the National Register of Historic Places listings in Seattle
- The Liggett Building, a former corporate headquarters building on 42nd Street in Manhattan for Liggett's Drugstores
- The Liggett Building, a historic building in Marysville, Ohio
