= Saunders and Lawton =

Architectural firm in Seattle, Washington (1898-1915)

Saunders and Lawton was an architectural firm consisting of partners George Willis Lawton and Charles Willard Saunders active from 1898 until 1915 in Seattle, Washington. Other architects at the firm included Herman A. Moldenhour, Paul David Richardson, and J. Charles Stanley. Following Saunders' retirement, Moldenhour would take his place as partner in the firm under the name Lawton & Moldenhour, who would have moderate success throughout the 1920s.

Moldenhour later designed the original terminal at Seattle–Tacoma International Airport.

== Work ==
=== Charles Saunders ===
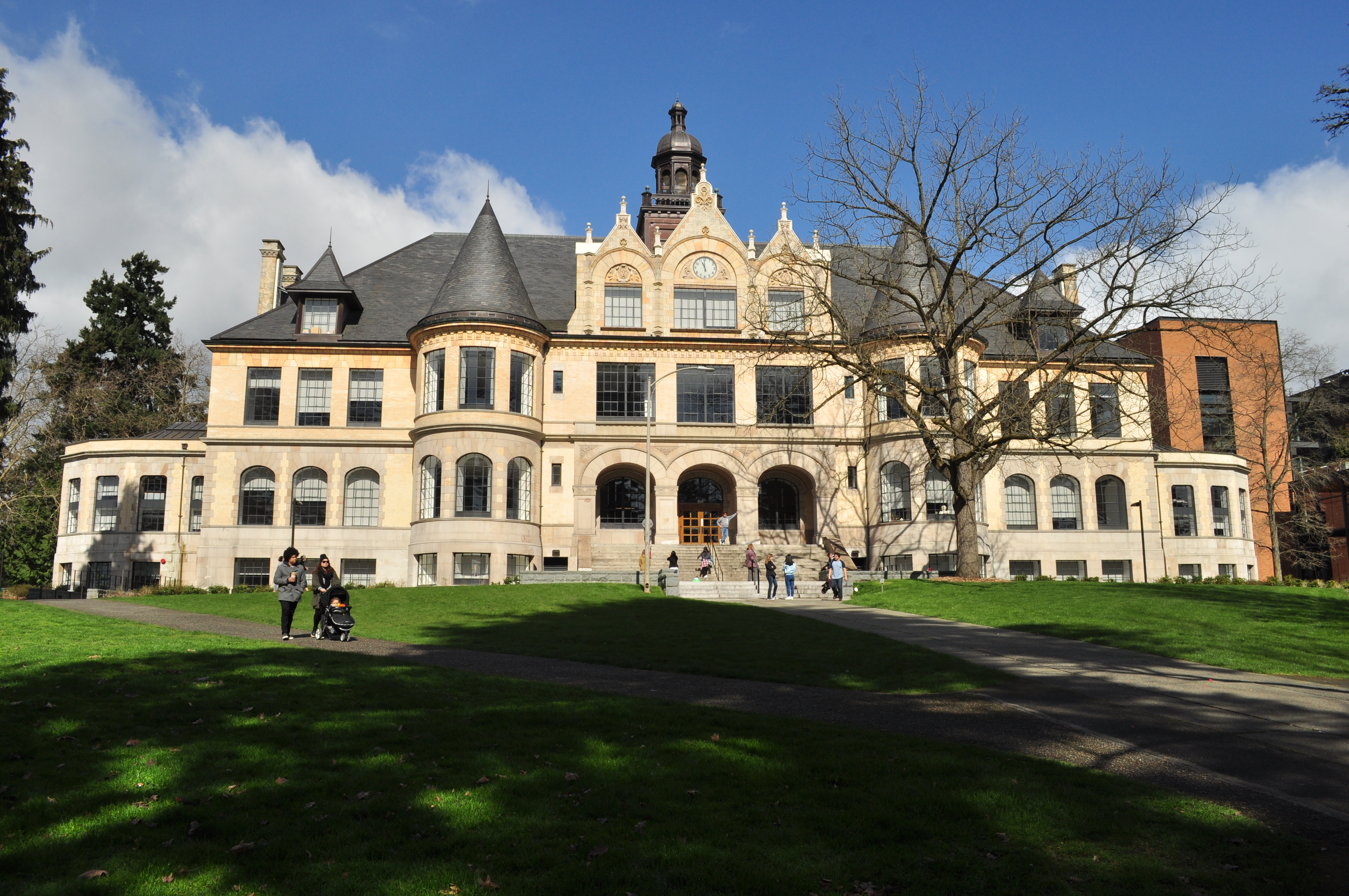
Denny Hall, University of Washington

- King County Courthouse #2 (1890–1891), First Hill, Seattle
- Cascade School (1893–1894), Cascade, Seattle
- Seattle Theatre #1 (1893), Downtown Seattle
- Denny Hall, Arthur Hall and Mary Hall, (1893–1895) University of Washington, Seattle
- The Bon Marché Department Store #2 (1896) Downtown Seattle

=== Saunders and Lawton ===
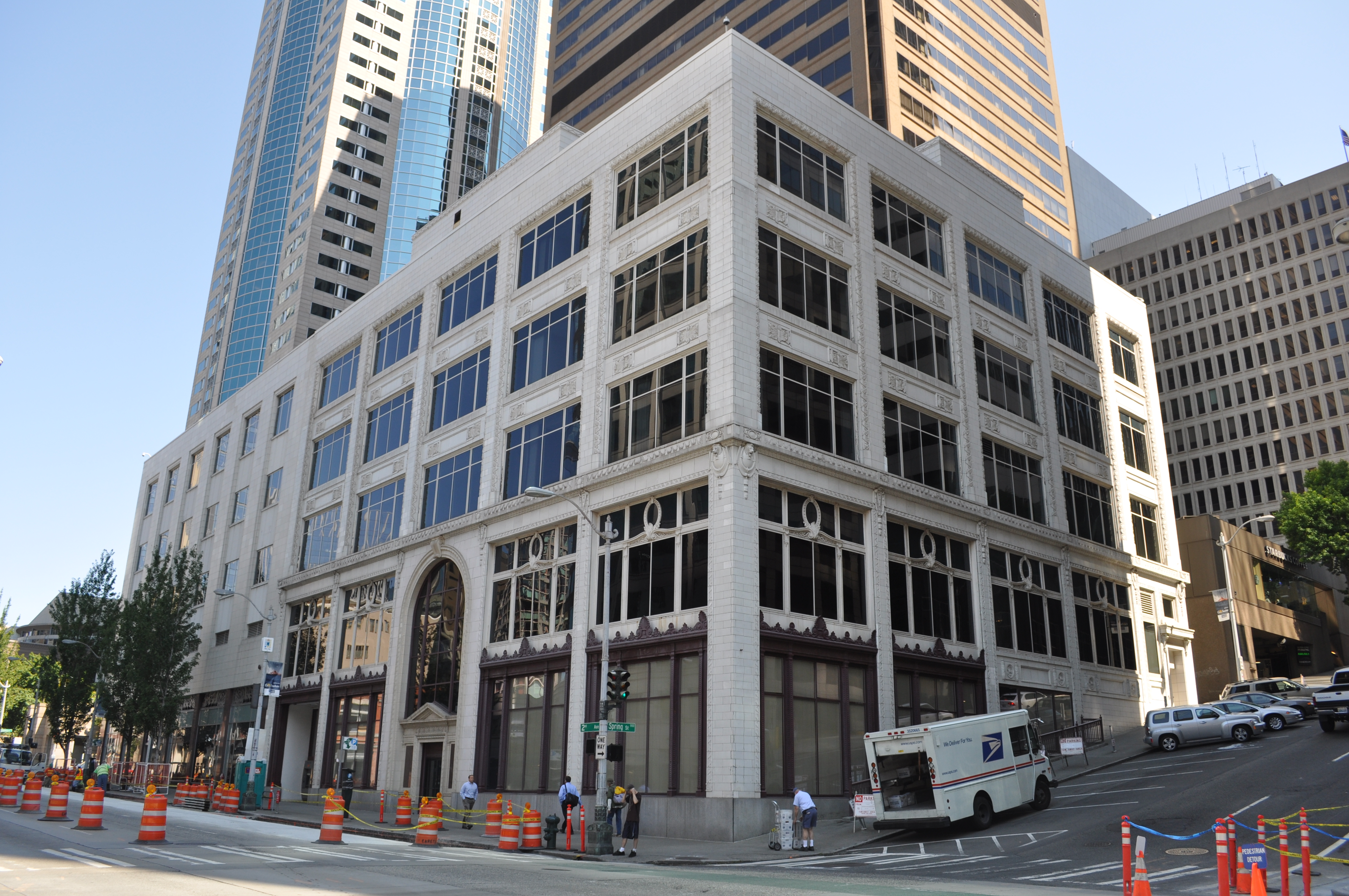
The Baillargeon Building (1907)

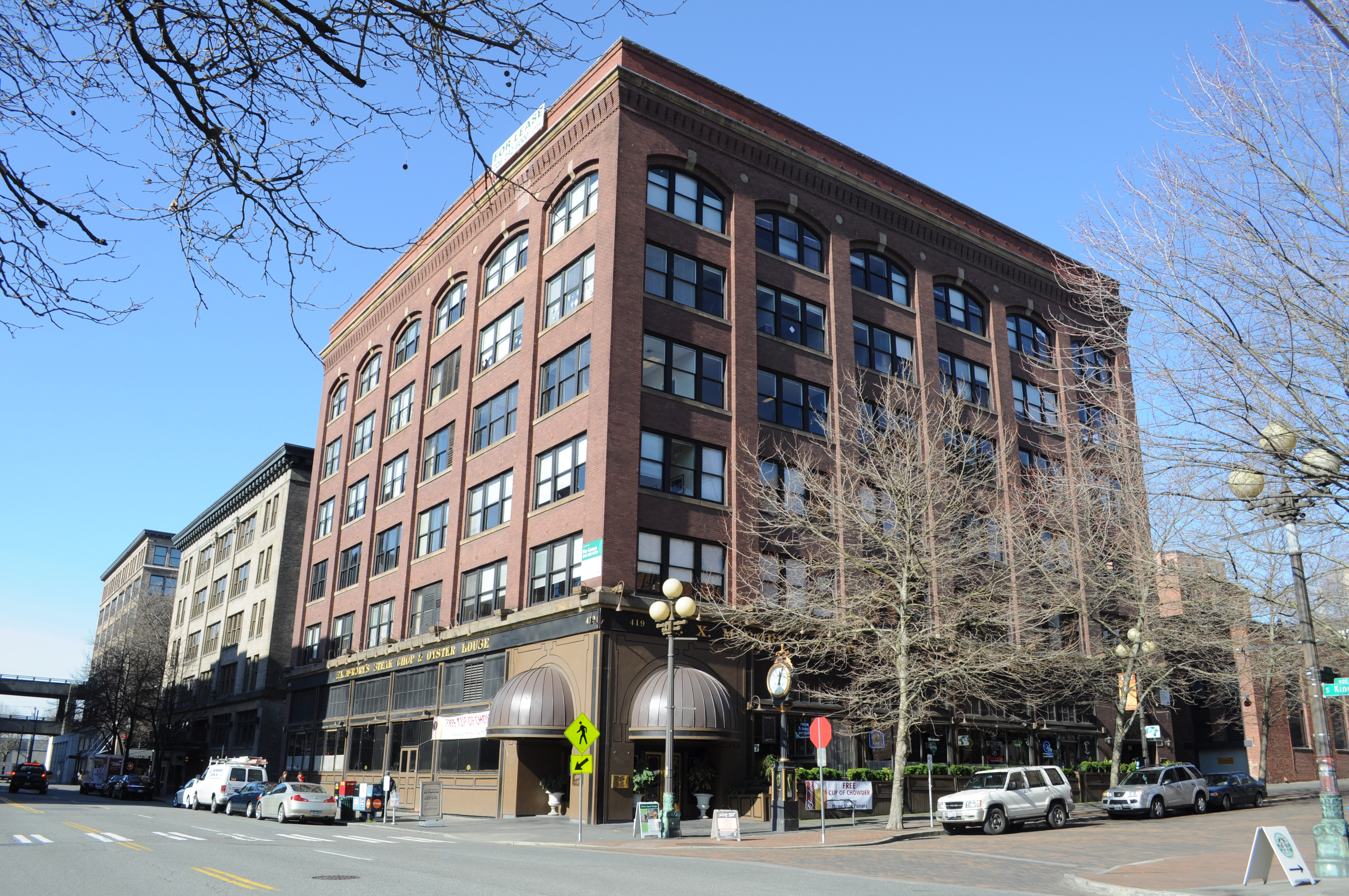
Manufacturers' Exchange Building (1907)

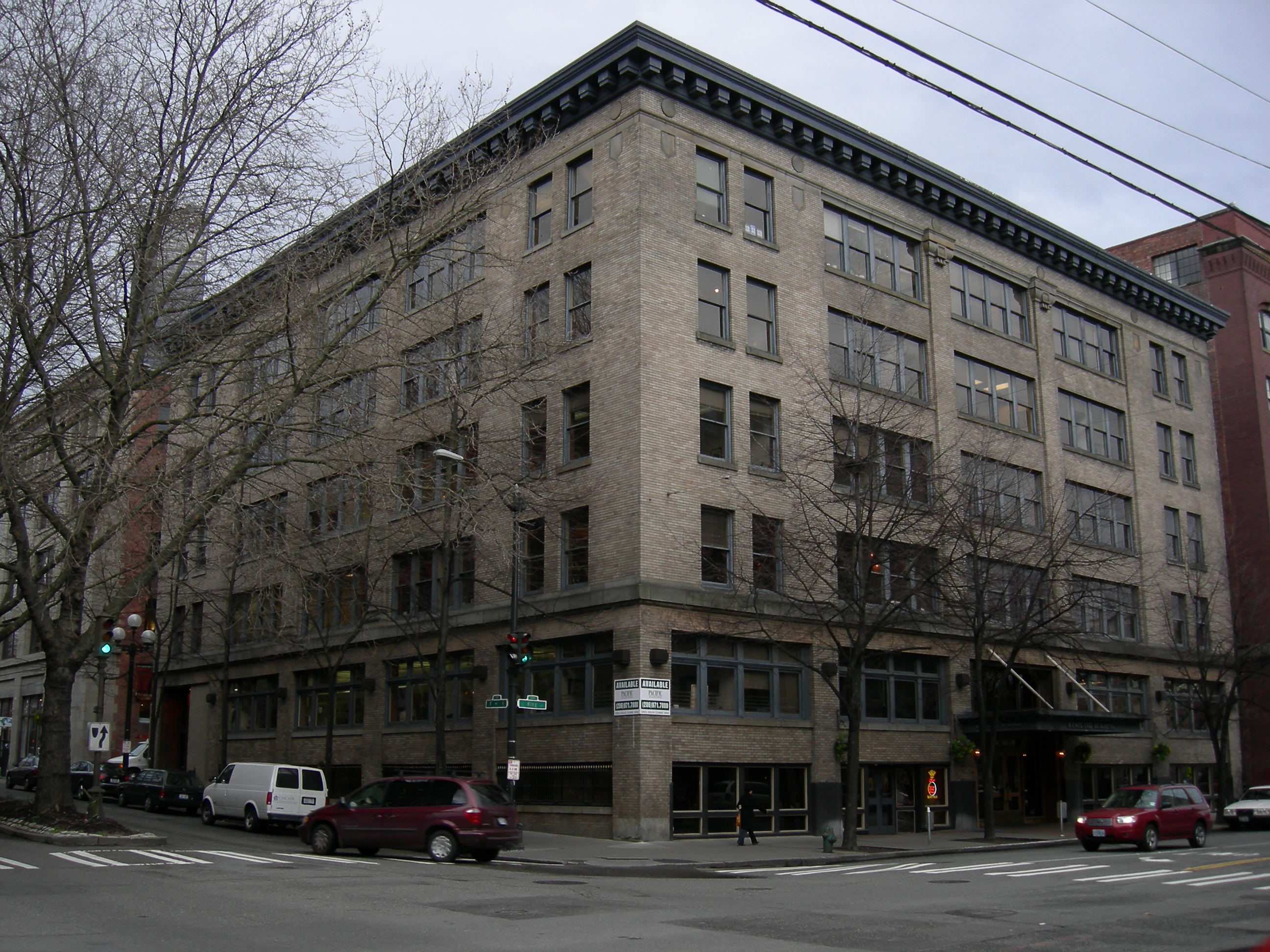
Westland Building in the Pioneer Square–Skid Road Historic District

- Stewart House (1898), Seattle
- Walla Walla Elementary School (1902), Central District, Seattle
- Lumber Exchange Building (1902–1903) downtown Seattle
- Alaska Building (1903–1904) at Pioneer Square in Seattle
- Beacon Hill Elementary School #2 (1903–1904), Beacon Hill, Seattle
- Norton Building #1 (1904), Seattle
- Dairy Barn (1909) at the Alaska–Yukon–Pacific Exposition (AYPE) in Seattle
- Forestry Building (1908–1909) at the AYPE, later served as the home of the Washington State Museum until a bark beetle infestation was discovered
- Women's Building (1908–1909) AYPE
- Alhambra Theatre #2 (1909) downtown Seattle
- Henry C. Chadwick House in Seattle
- Cottage Project in Seattle
- Crane Company warehouse and office building (1907), Pioneer Square, Seattle
- Dunn Tin Storage Warehouse, Seattle
- Dr. R.P. Lincoln Apartment House, Seattle,
- Manufacturers Building (1905–1906), Pioneer Square, Seattle
- Mottman Lodge, Seattle
- Northern State Hospital, Sedro-Woolley
- Polson Building (1909–1910), Pioneer Square, Seattle
- Rainier Club (1904), downtown Seattle
- Seattle Buddhist Church #1 (1906–1908), First Hill, Seattle (Note: Demolished as a part of the Yesler Terrace housing project, replaced by the Seattle Betsuin Buddhist Temple)
- Monroe Correctional Complex, Monroe, Washington
- Westland Building, Pioneer Square, Seattle designed for Albert Hambach
- Masonic Lodge (1915), First Hill, Seattle

== Lawton & Moldenhour ==
- One or more buildings in Hawthorne Square, 4800 Fremont Avenue North in Seattle
- Liggett Building (1927), 1424 4th Avenue in Seattle
