= Mount Pleasant Cemetery (Seattle) =

Cemetery in the U.S. state of Washington

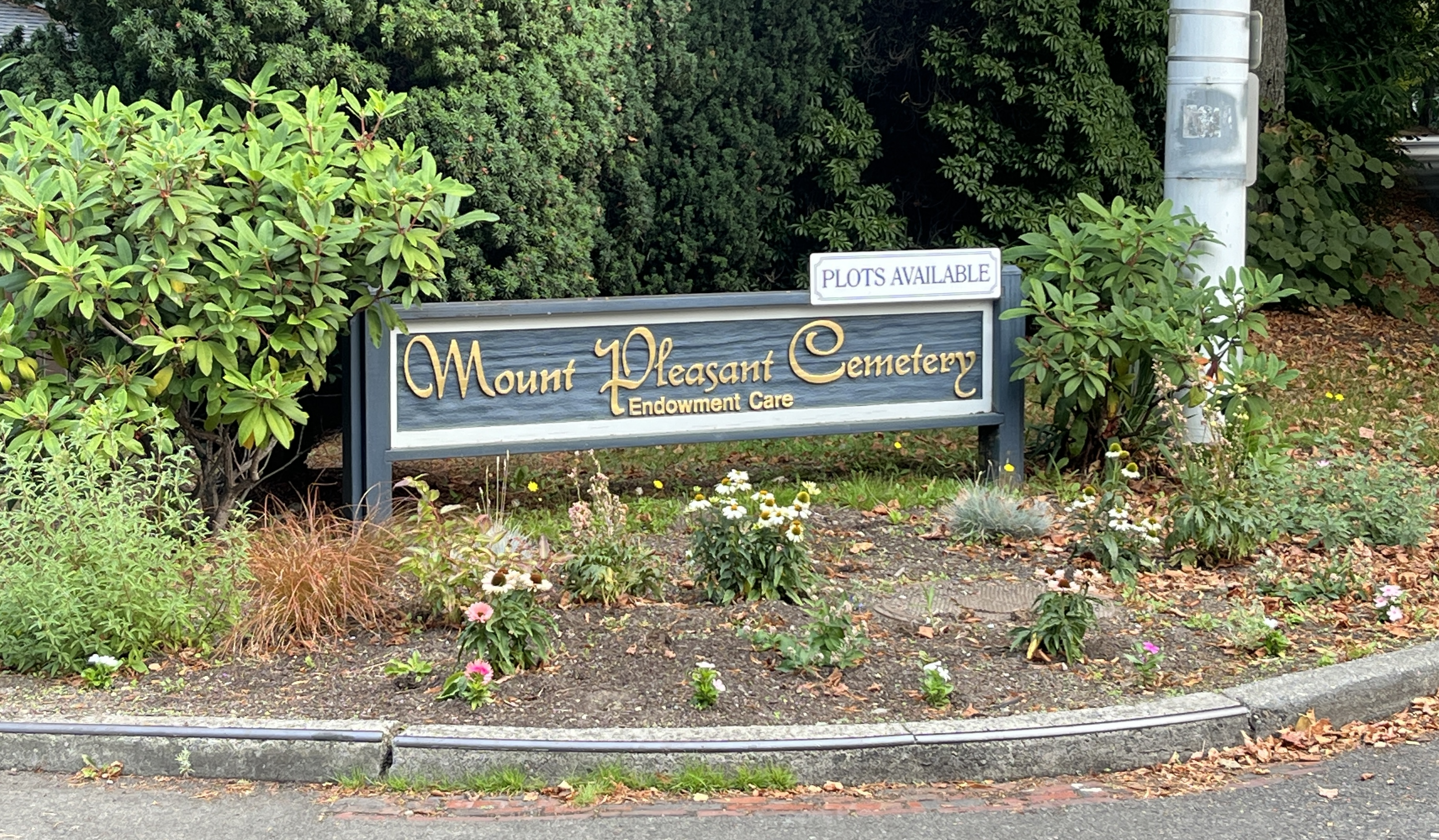
- Entrance sign, 2024
- Interactive map of Mount Pleasant Cemetery

Details
- Location: Seattle, Washington
- Country: United States
- Coordinates: 47°38′43″N 122°21′57″W

Mount Pleasant Cemetery is a cemetery in Seattle's Queen Anne neighborhood, in the U.S. state of Washington. It opened in 1879.

The cemetery contains the remains of the unknown dead of the 1906 SS Valencia disaster, as well as many early Seattle pioneers, and Filipino-American author and activist Carlos Bulosan. A memorial to the dead of the 1916 Everett Massacre is located in the northeast section of the cemetery. During World War II, the cemetery served as a site for anti-aircraft defenses.
