= Liggett Building (Seattle) =

Historic NRHP building in Seattle, Washington

- U.S. National Register of Historic Places
- Seattle Landmark
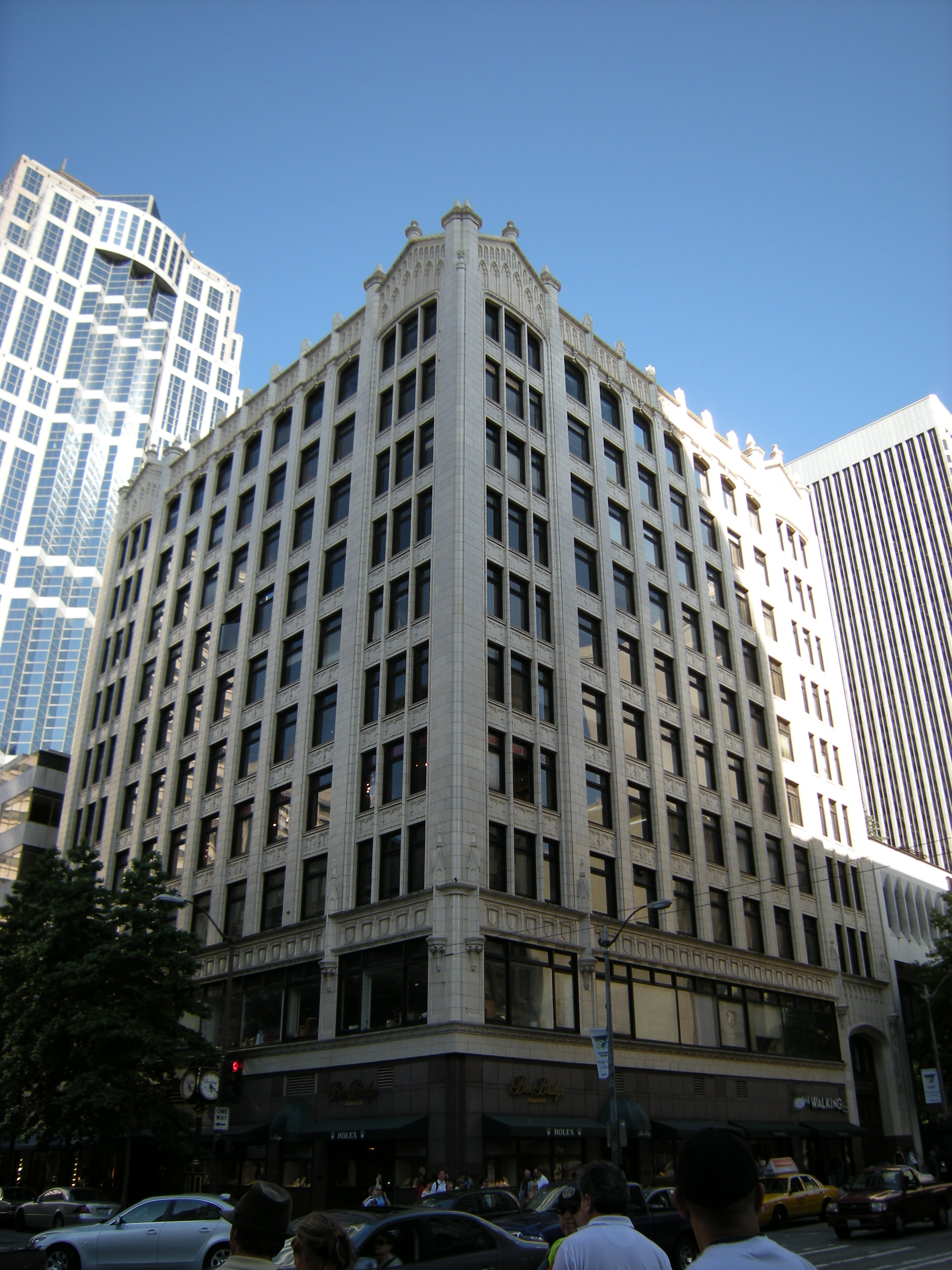
- The Liggett Building in 2009
- Location: 1424 4th Ave., Seattle, Washington
- Built: 1927
- Built by: Murdock & Eckman
- Architect: Lawton & Moldenhour
- Architectural style: Late Gothic Revival
- NRHP reference No.: 11000626
- Added to NRHP: August 31, 2011

The Liggett Building, also referred to as the Fourth & Pike Building, is a historic 10-story office building at 1424 4th Avenue in downtown Seattle, Washington. It was built in 1927 by the Louis K. Liggett Company, under lease from the estate of local pioneer George Kinnear, to house the first Seattle location of their national drug store chain as well as leasable office and retail space. Liggett's would break their 99-year lease on the building only a few years later after having opened a second location only a block away proved financially unwise during the Great Depression. The building received its current name after a 1933 renovation. Designed by Lawton & Moldenhour in the Gothic revival style, it is clad entirely in locally manufactured terracotta. It is an official Seattle City Landmark and was listed on the National Register of Historic Places on August 31, 2011.

== History ==
The site of the Liggett Building was historically owned by Seattle pioneer Captain George Kinnear (1836–1912). In the years immediately after the Great Seattle Fire the predominantly residential Pike Street corridor was rapidly transformed into a major commercial arterial lined with denser tenement houses and hotels. Kinnear's lot, previously occupied by several small workingman's cottages by 1893 was packed with a collection of wood-frame shops and lodging houses. In response to the northward expansion of Seattle's business district spurned on by the Yukon Gold Rush, in 1905 he commissioned architects Graham & Myers to design a $30,000 two-story brick commercial building in the Renaissance Revival style to fill the property. This building would soon be dwarfed by surrounding high-rise development. Following Kinnear's death the building and all his other properties would be taken over by the George Kinnear Company, formed by his estate in 1921.

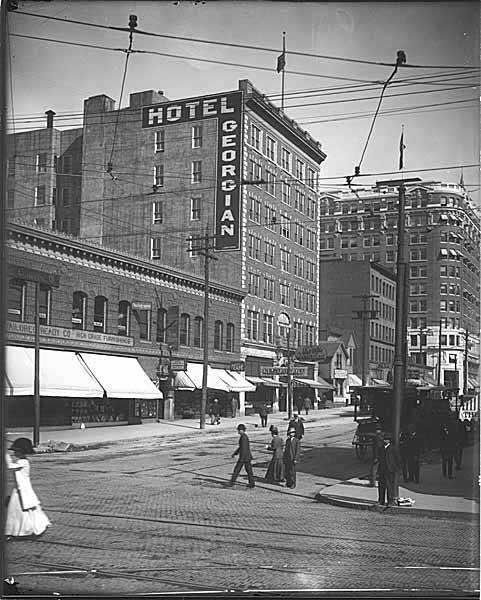
Fourth and Pike Streets c. 1911, the 1905 Kinnear Building is on the left.

In early 1926 after an exhaustive search for a site that provided "in the highest degree present and permanent centrality with respect to Seattle's business district", the Louis K. Liggett Company, a division of United Drug Stores (later known as Rexall), signed a 99-year lease on the property from the George Kinnear Company through the Goodwin Real Estate Company. Through Goodwin they commissioned local architects Lawton & Moldenhour (successor to Saunders & Lawton) to design a ten-story Gothic Revival Skyscraper of concrete reinforced steel and clad in terracotta to replace the 1905 Kinnear Building, then mostly occupied by the Tailored Ready Company, one of Seattle's largest clothing stores at the time. Liggett's would occupy the largest of 6 retail spaces on the ground floor, their first store in Seattle and 380th in the chain overall. The upper floors were to contain class-A office space to let, with the design allowing for 5 more floors to be added if the market demanded it. All labor and materials used on the building were locally sourced; Builders Murdock & Eckman were awarded the $600,000 contract and Steel & Phelps took care of the heating, plumbing and electric work. The terracotta was manufactured by Gladding, McBean & Co. at their branch plant in Renton.

Demolition of the Kinnear Building began in September 1926. Structural work, with steel provided by the Pacific Coast Steel Company, was largely complete by March 1927 and the building was ready for occupancy by July 1. Among its early tenants was the offices of both the Goodwin Company and contractors Murdock & Eckman, as well as prominent residential architects J. Lister Holmes and William J. Bain. Joining Liggett's on the ground floor were Ed Oliver's clothing store on Pike and Clement B. Coffin Jewelry on 4th and later a branch of Van de Kamp's Holland Dutch Bakeries. The entire second floor, also designed for retail space, was occupied by national men's clothing chain Tilton's beginning in 1929. Upon completion the building was hailed as a monument to commercial stability and demonstrated the confidence that Eastern capitalists had in the city.

Towards the end of 1927 Liggett's would open a second store only a block away in the newly completed Republic Building, whose construction most of the same firms were involved in. Owing to their close proximity and the growing effects of the Great Depression, they would quietly shutter the store in their namesake building in the early 1930s, the space being taken up by Kings discount clothing store. In 1933 the building underwent a $50,000 interior remodeling by architect Earl Morrison, refitting the 7th, 8th and 9th floors for medical and dental offices and officially changing the building's name to the Fourth and Pike Building. Litigation surrounding the building in the mid-1930s would leave many tenants in the lurch, delaying lease renewals and forcing largest retail tenant Tilton's to move out. Their space and the former Liggett's space would be leased to Los Angeles-based men's clothier Foreman & Clark; their first Seattle store where they would remain for several decades. Ben Bridge Jeweler, opened at 405 Pike Street in 1928, would eventually take over most of the ground floor and would become one of the Northwest's largest jewelry store chains. The Ben Bridge clock, located outside the building on Pike Street, is separately listed as a Seattle Landmark as well.

The building would retain much of its character throughout the years, with only the ground floor seeing numerous remodels for its various tenants. In 1945 the building was purchased from the Kinnear Company by Peoples National Bank who would sell it to 4th & Pike Street Corp. in 1950. The building has been owned by various corporations and LLCs with variations of the building's name ever since.
