= Northeast Queen Anne Greenbelt =

Public park in Seattle, Washington, U.S.

- Interactive map of Northeast Queen Anne Greenbelt
- Location: Queen Anne, Seattle, Washington, U.S.
- Coordinates: 47.6351°N 122.3444°W
- Area: 35 acres (14 ha)
- Operator: Seattle Parks and Recreation

The Northeast Queen Anne Greenbelt is an approximately 35-acre public park in Seattle's Queen Anne neighborhood, in the U.S. state of Washington. The park connects to Trolley Hill Park and MacLean Park. Northeast Queen Anne Greenbelt has seen homeless encampments. The volunteer group We Heart Seattle has hosted clean-ups at the park.

== See also ==
- List of parks in Seattle
