= North Queen Anne Drive Bridge =

Bridge in Seattle, Washington, United States

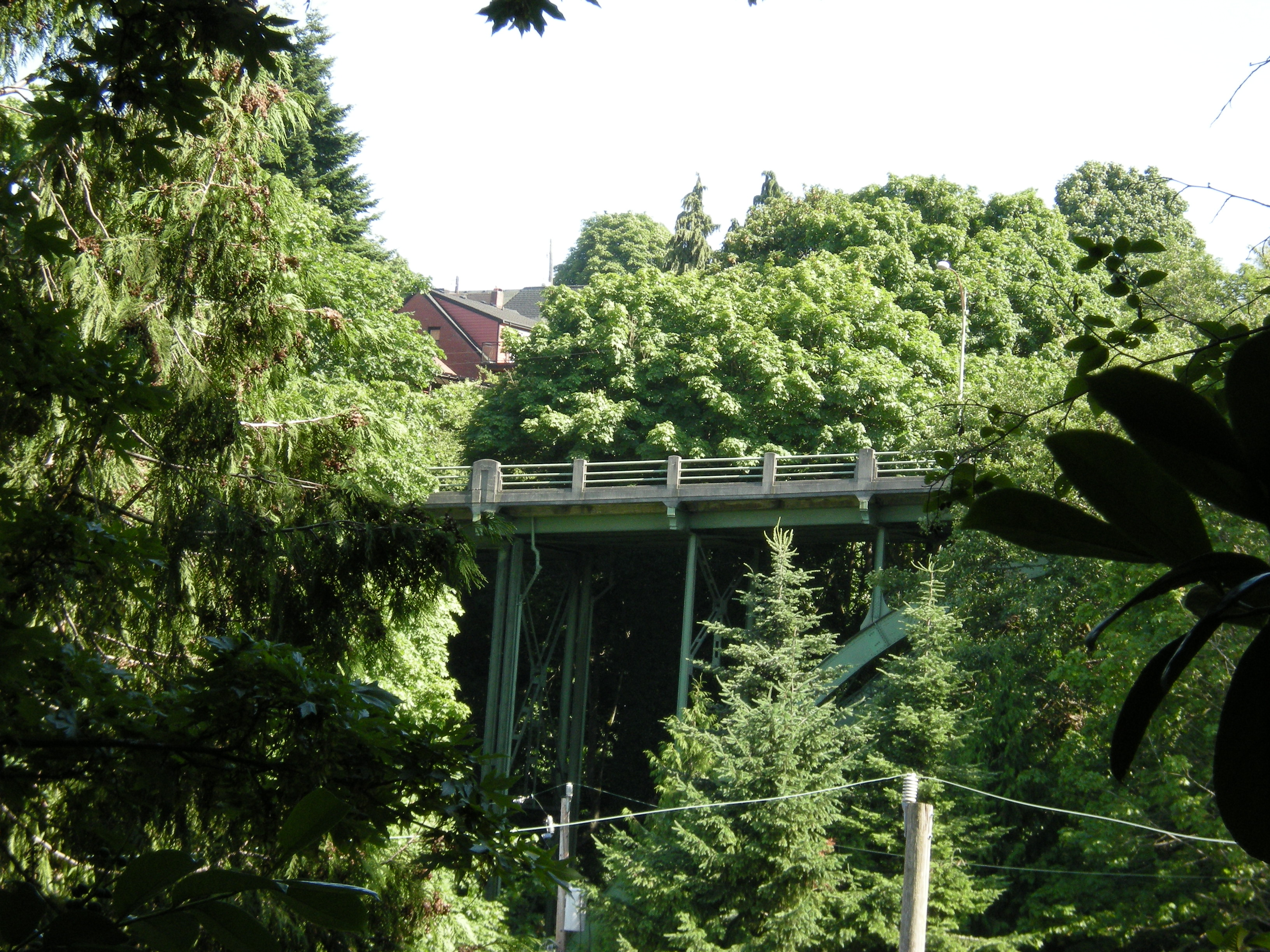
- Coordinates: 47.64224°N 122.35237°W
- Crosses: Wolf Creek
- Heritage status: Seattle city landmark

Characteristics
- Design: deck arch
- Material: Steel and concrete
- Total length: 238-foot (73 m)

History
- Opened: 1936

The North Queen Anne Drive Bridge is a deck arch bridge that spans Seattle's Wolf Creek. The 238 ft (73 m) long steel and concrete structure was built in 1936 to replace the previous wood-constructed crossing. It serves as a connection between the Queen Anne neighborhood and the George Washington Memorial Bridge that carries State Route 99. The arch is unusually high and uses a minimal number of supporting members. It was designated a city landmark on December 28, 1981, because of its unique engineering style.

An expansion joint suffered cracking and spalling during the 2001 Nisqually earthquake. The bridge has been retrofitted to make it more earthquake-resistant.
