= Sorrento Hotel =

Hotel in Seattle, Washington, United States

Hotel Sorrento
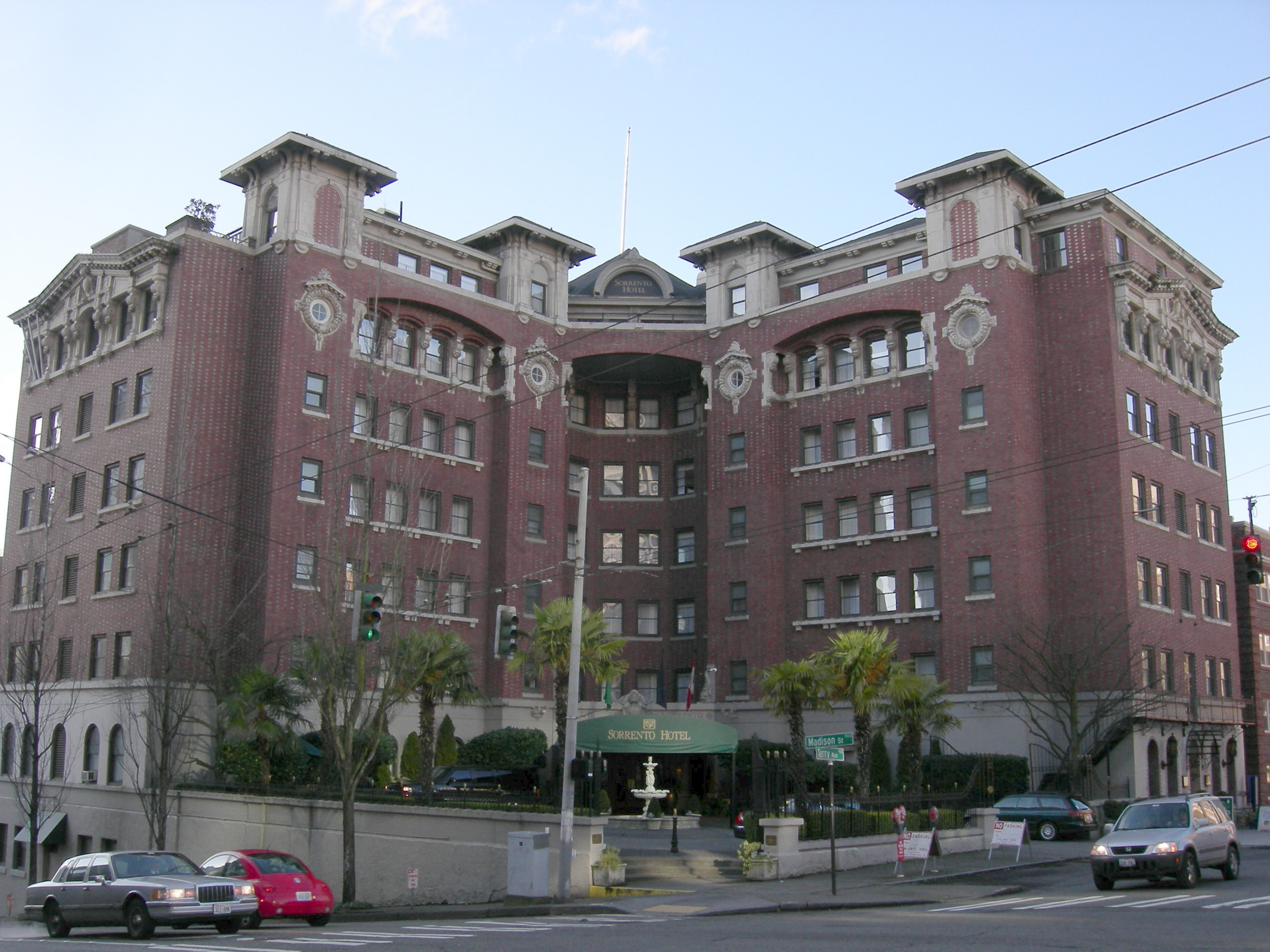

- Location within central Seattle

General information
- Location: 900 Madison Street, First Hill, Seattle, Washington, United States
- Coordinates: 47°36′32″N 122°19′36″W
- Opening: 1909

Design and construction
- Architect: Harlan Thomas

Other information
- Parking

Seattle Landmark
- Designated: May 14, 2010

Hotel Sorrento is an Italian oasis style hotel in Seattle, Washington, United States, located in the historic First Hill neighborhood.

The Hotel Sorrento opened in 1909, just before the Alaska-Yukon-Pacific Exposition was held in the city. Developed by a Seattle clothier named Samuel Rosenberg, the hotel was under financial distress in its early existence. After suffering losses, in 1910 Rosenberg traded the hotel for a 240-acre orchard in Oregon's Rogue River Valley. Incidentally, Rosenberg's sons, Harry and David, assumed management of the orchard, selling their prized pears in baskets under the famed Harry & David nameplate.

Among the hotel's architectural features, the Rookwood tiles composing the fireplace surround in the Fireside Room are especially noteworthy.

The hotel was bought by the Malone Family in the 1980s who fully renovated the building. It was listed on the National Register of Historic Places in 2021.

A fictional version of the building named Serevena Hotel is featured in the 2020 video game The Last of Us Part II.
