= West Queen Anne School =

- Queen Anne Public School
- U.S. National Register of Historic Places
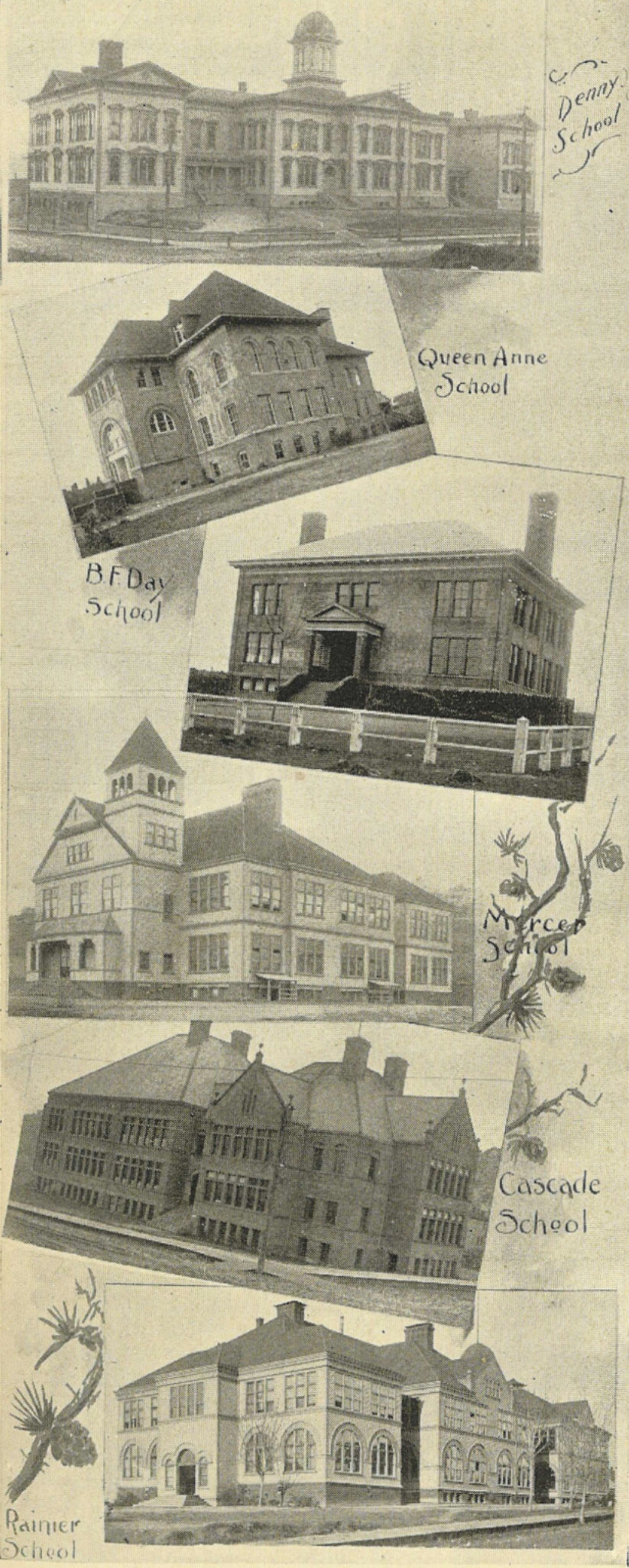
- Six Seattle public elementary schools in 1900. The Queen Anne School is the second school pictured.

- Location within Washington (state)
- Location: 515 W. Galer St., Seattle, Washington
- Coordinates: 47°37′56″N 122°21′46″W
- Area: 1.9 acres (0.77 ha)
- Built: 1895
- Architect: Skillings & Corner
- Architectural style: Romanesque, Richardsonian Romanesque
- NRHP reference No.: 75001858
- Added to NRHP: July 30, 1975

The West Queen Anne School was a Seattle public elementary school located in the Queen Anne, Seattle neighborhood from 1896 to 1981 and is now high-end condominiums. The School was listed on the National Register of Historic Places in 1975 as Queen Anne Public School and two years later became a Seattle landmark. The old sign "West Queen Anne Public School" still hangs over the former Galer Street main entrance.

Designed in the popular Richardsonian Romanesque style by Warren P. Skillings and James M. Corner, construction on the Queen Anne School began in 1895 and classes opened in the fall of 1896. As the neighborhood grew, several additions were added to the school. Classrooms were added in 1899 and again in 1902; in 1916, an additional 10 classrooms and an auditorium were added on the south end, and the school's main entrance, originally facing Lee Street, was moved to Galer Street. Until its renovation in 1984, the last major addition to the school was the principal's office, added in 1920.

Originally the Queen Anne School, in 1908 the school's name was changed to the West Queen Anne Elementary School to avoid confusion with Queen Anne High School.

In 1974, after the Boeing Bust and subsequent Seattle recession, Seattle School District staff recommended closing the school due to declining enrollment. A grassroots effort of parents, teachers and local residents worked together to keep the school open and nominated the building for historic status as part of their effort. It was the first Seattle school to receive National Register of Historic Places status. The school remained open through 1981.

In 1983, the Seattle School District gave Historic Seattle a 99-year land lease on the school's 1.76-acre (7,100 m^{2}) property, with an option to renew for another 99 years. Historic Seattle transferred the site to the West Queen Anne Association, formed for the condominium conversion, and in 1983-84, the architectural firm of Cardwell/Thomas and Associates renovated and converted the school into 49 condominium units.

The school is now home to over 75 residents, has been featured in magazines including Architectural Digest and Metropolitan Home magazines, and has been a stop on Historic Seattle's Queen Anne tour. Historic photos of the school adorn the walls, including a picture of students on the front lawn holding bird houses, students playing "What have you in your basket" and one of a classroom with this excerpt written on the chalkboard from "Hiawatha's Childhood" by Henry Wadsworth Longfellow:

'Tis the heaven of flowers you see there;
All the wild-flowers of the forest,
All the lilies of the prairie,
When on earth they fade and perish,
Blossom in that heaven above us.

West Queen Anne School's classrooms-to-condominiums conversion was the largest privately financed rehabilitation-and-reuse project of its type in the Northwest and is now a national model for salvaging surplus schools.
