= Kinnear Park =

Park in Seattle, Washington, United States

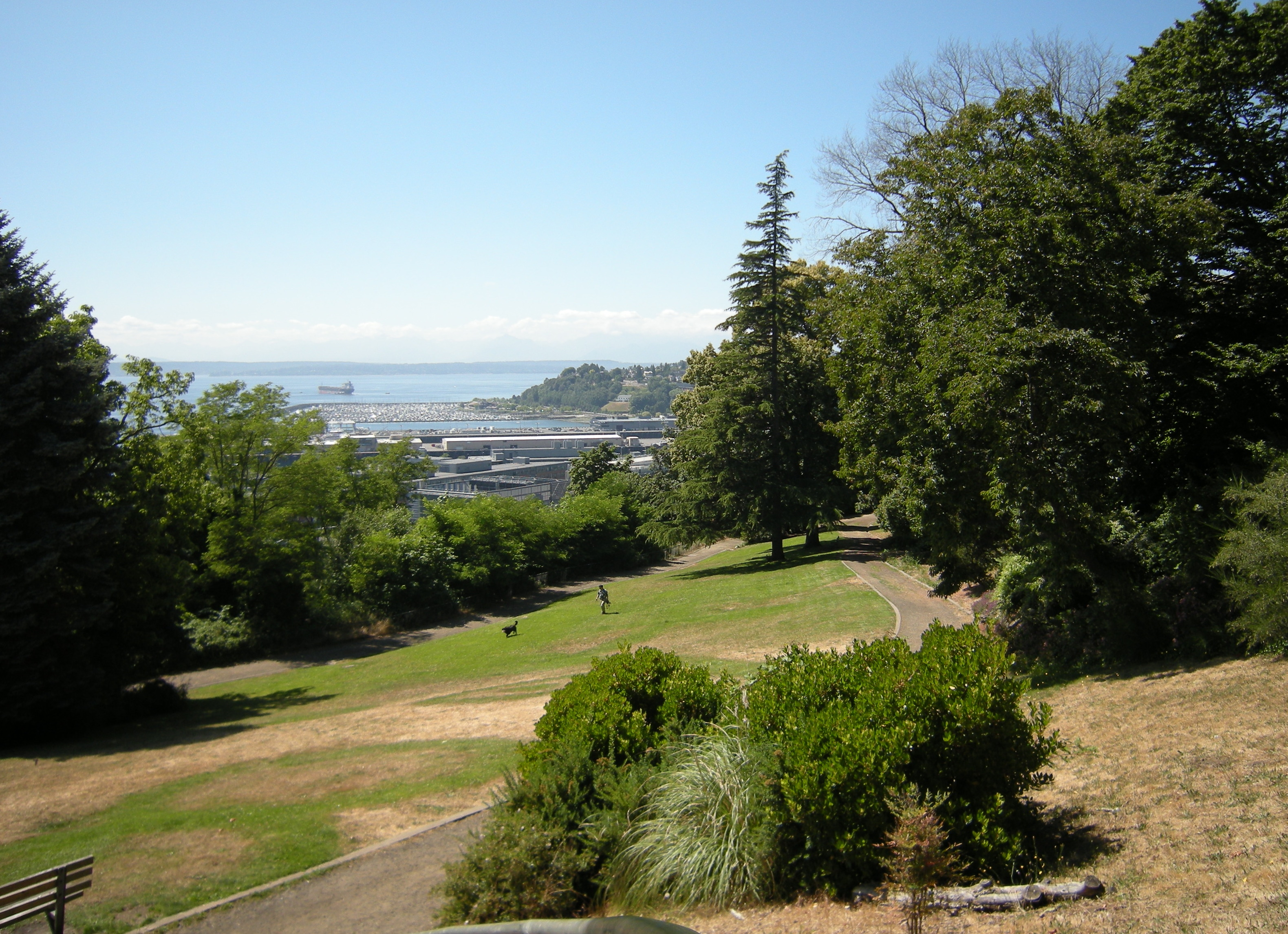
- Smith Cove seen from Kinnear Park
- Interactive map of Kinnear Park
- Type: Urban park
- Location: Seattle, Washington
- Coordinates: 47°37′37.5″N 122°21′54″W
- Area: 14.1 acres (5.7 ha)
- Operator: Seattle Parks and Recreation
- Status: Open year round
- Website: Official website

Kinnear Park is a 14.1-acre (57,000 m^{2}) park on the southwest slope of Queen Anne Hill in Seattle, Washington, United States located between W. Olympic Place on the northeast, W. Mercer Place and Elliott Avenue W. on the southwest, the 9th Avenue W. right of way on the west, and the 6th Avenue W. right of way on the east. It is two-tiered, with a lawn and open space atop the cliff, and a wooded area below.

== History ==
Kinnear Park is named for local real estate developer George Kinnear, who sold an 11-acre (4.5 ha) parcel of land to the city for a dollar in 1887. He donated a second parcel of 3 acres (1.2 ha) in 1897. While work on the park had already begun when E. O. Schwagerl was appointed Seattle's superintendent of parks in 1892, he greatly influenced its design as its landscape architect, directing the planting and the construction of various amenities.

In 1903, John C. Olmsted was commissioned to prepare a comprehensive parks plan for Seattle. Although Kinnear Park had already been completed, he approved of its design, saying in his report, "the park is pleasing in detail and extremely valuable, owing to the fine views which it commands over the Sound. It is a good sample of the miles of similar bluff parks which it is hoped the city will eventually have," and including the park in his overall plan.

It has been designated a Seattle landmark by the city government.
