= Harlan Thomas =

American architect

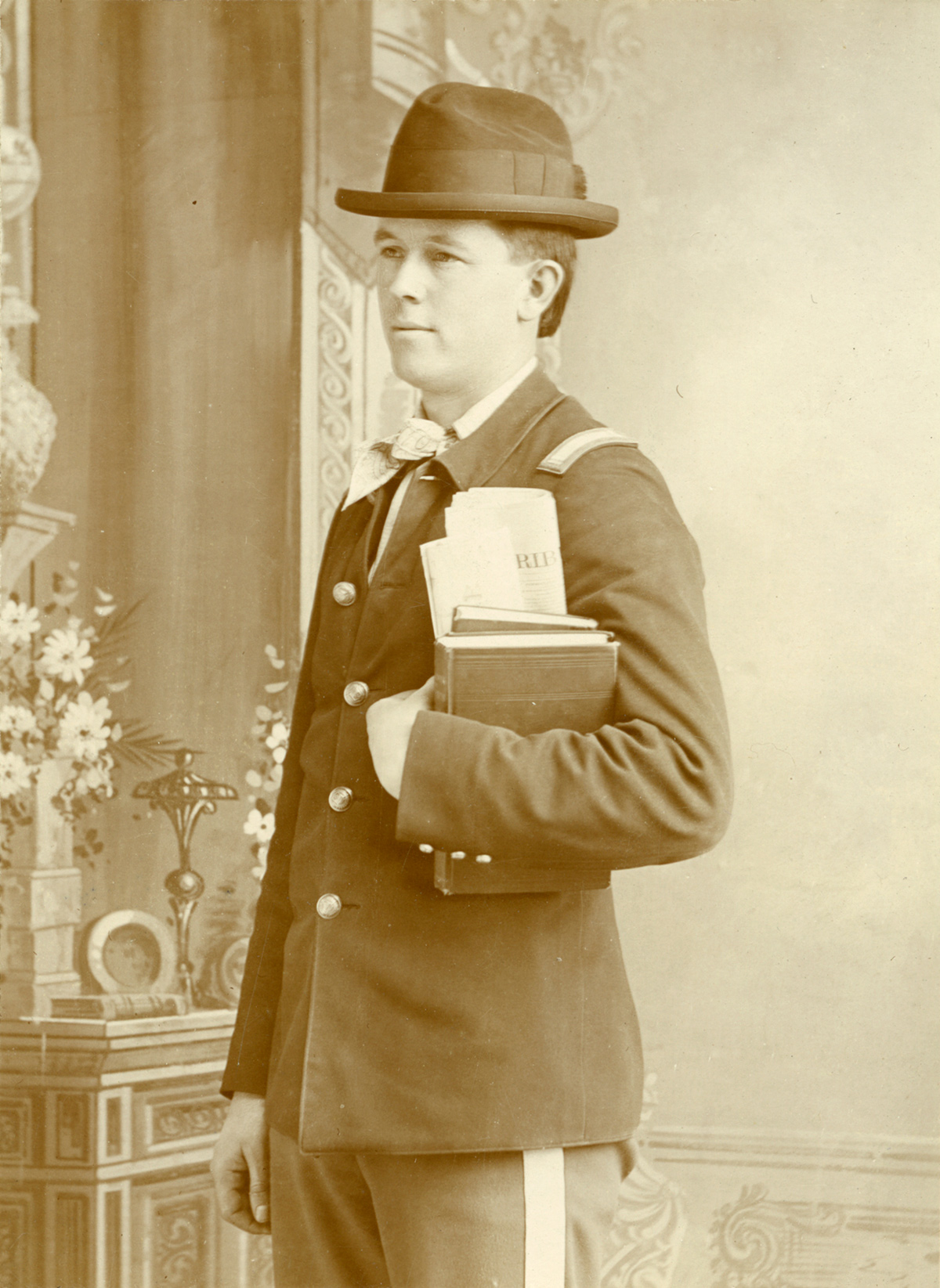
Thomas in 1894

Harlan Thomas (January 10, 1870 – September 4, 1953) was an American architect in the first half of the twentieth century. From 1926 to the early 1940s he served as Chair of the University of Washington Department of Architecture. He was also a noted watercolorist.

== Biography ==
Harlan Thomas was born in 1870 in Des Moines, Iowa. His family moved to Fort Collins, Colorado in 1879. Thomas entered the Colorado State College at Fort Collins in 1885, but after the death of his father the following year, he was forced to drop out and apprenticed as a carpenter, subsequently moving to Denver. In 1889 he took a job as a draftsman for a Denver architect, a position he held for two years. In 1891 he returned to Colorado State College; he majored in mathematics and mechanics, and graduated in 1895 with a Bachelor of Science degree. After a year in Denver working as an architect, Thomas married and then spent sixteen months in Europe. While in Paris, he studied with an atelier independent of the École des Beaux-Arts. Thomas returned to Denver and practiced as an architect in the city for the next decade.

In 1906, Harlan Thomas moved to Seattle, where he quickly achieved success, soon winning the commissions for the Chelsea Hotel (an apartment hotel in the Queen Anne neighborhood) and for the Sorrento Hotel (an elegant upscale tourist hotel on the edge of downtown). In the next few years his firm prospered and he received commissions for several schools in smaller cities in western Washington.

About 1910, Thomas entered into the first of several partnerships which would be the focus of his professional career thereafter—Thomas, Russell and Rice; Thomas and Grainger; Thomas, Grainger and Thomas (with Clyde Grainger (1887–1958) and his own son, Donald P. Thomas (1898–1970)). Among the best known of the projects of these partnerships are the Corner Market Building (1911–12) in the Pike Place Market, and (in joint venture with W. Marbury Somervell) several branch libraries in Seattle—Queen Anne, Columbia, and Henry L. Yesler (now Douglass-Truth). The best-known project of the Thomas, Grainger and Thomas partnership is the Art Deco-influenced Harborview Hospital (1929–31).

Thomas served as president of the Washington State Chapter of the American Institute of Architects (predecessor to today's AIA Seattle Chapter) from 1924 to 1926.

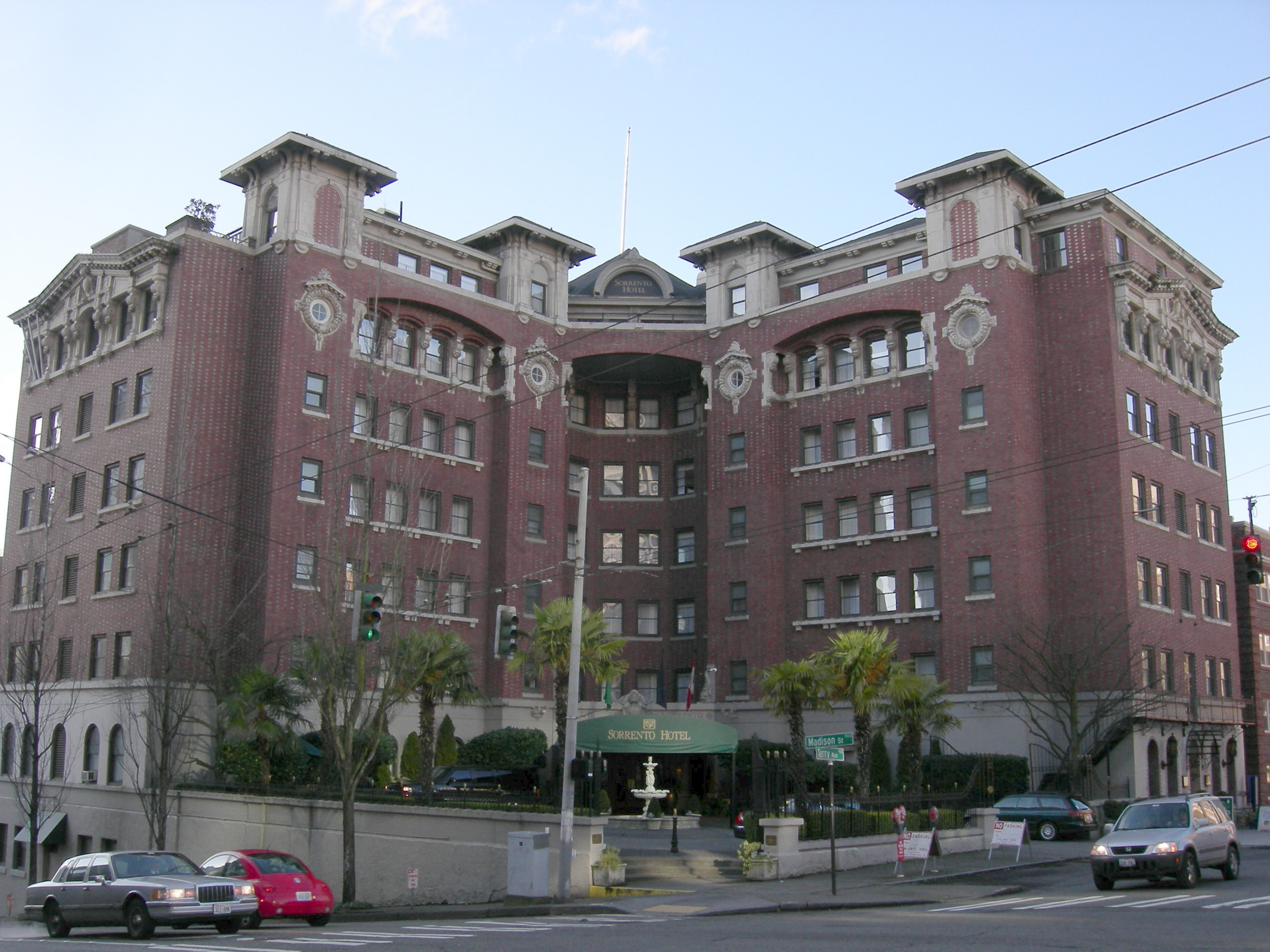
The Sorrento Hotel.

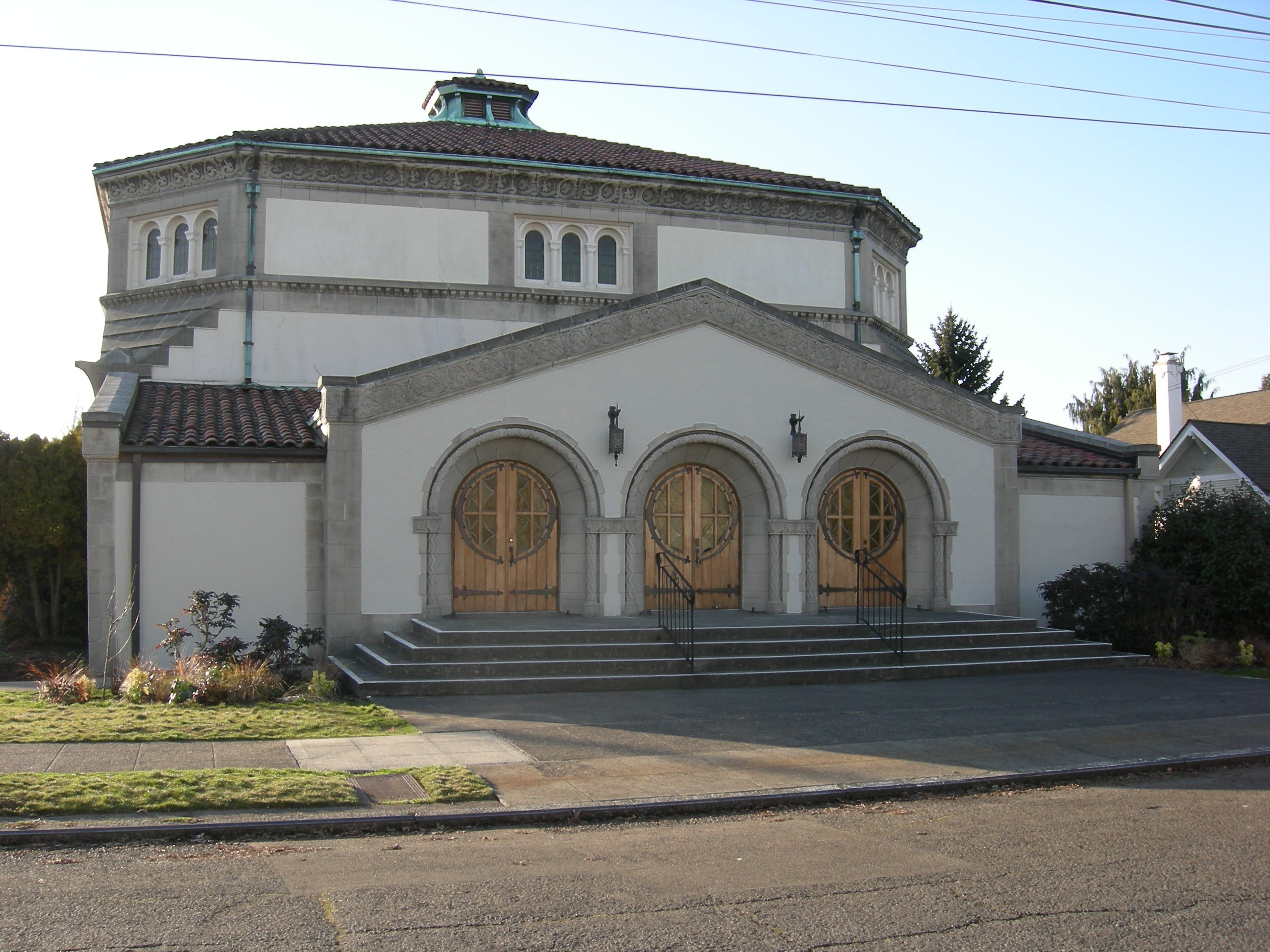
7th Church of Christ Scientist building, Queen Anne, designed by Harlan Thomas.

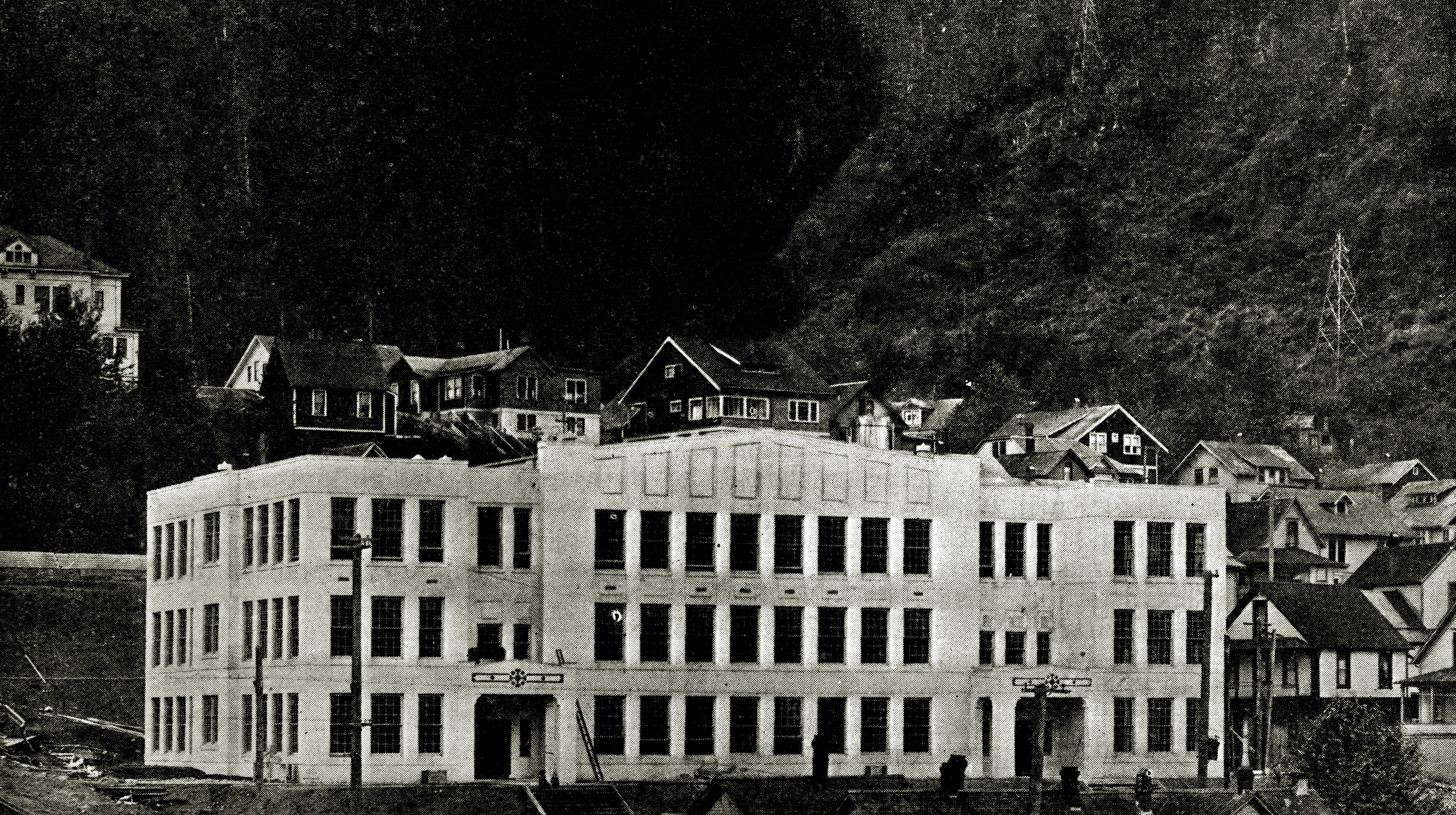
Juneau Public Schools, Juneau, Alaska, designed by Thomas, Grainger and Thomas.

In 1926, he was appointed as the second chair of the Department of Architecture at the University of Washington succeeding Carl F. Gould. Like Gould he held the position on a half-time basis and continued to maintain an active architectural practice. In 1928 Thomas secured funds for additional faculty and was able to entice Lionel Pries to join the Department. Thomas served as head of the program through the early 1940s, but by 1940, day-to-day administrative functions were increasingly handled by Arthur Herrman, who became executive officer.

He was elected a Fellow in the AIA in 1935. In 1941, after Thomas's retirement from day-to-day direction of the architecture school, he was elected Director of the Western Mountain District, American Institute of Architects.

Throughout his life, Thomas was an avid watercolorist, noted for his soft, meticulous technique, particularly appropriate to the many landscapes he painted.

Thomas completely retired from practice in 1949. He died in Seattle in 1953.
