= George Kinnear =

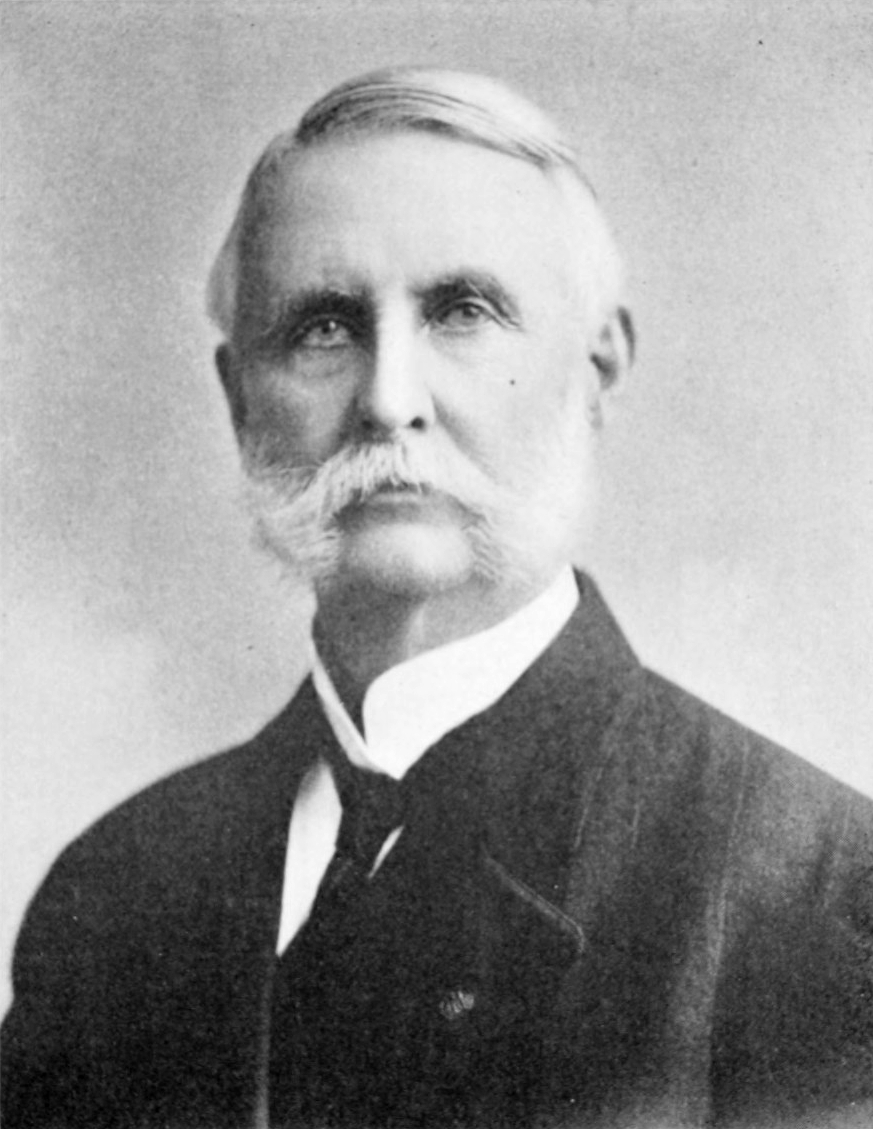
George Kinnear

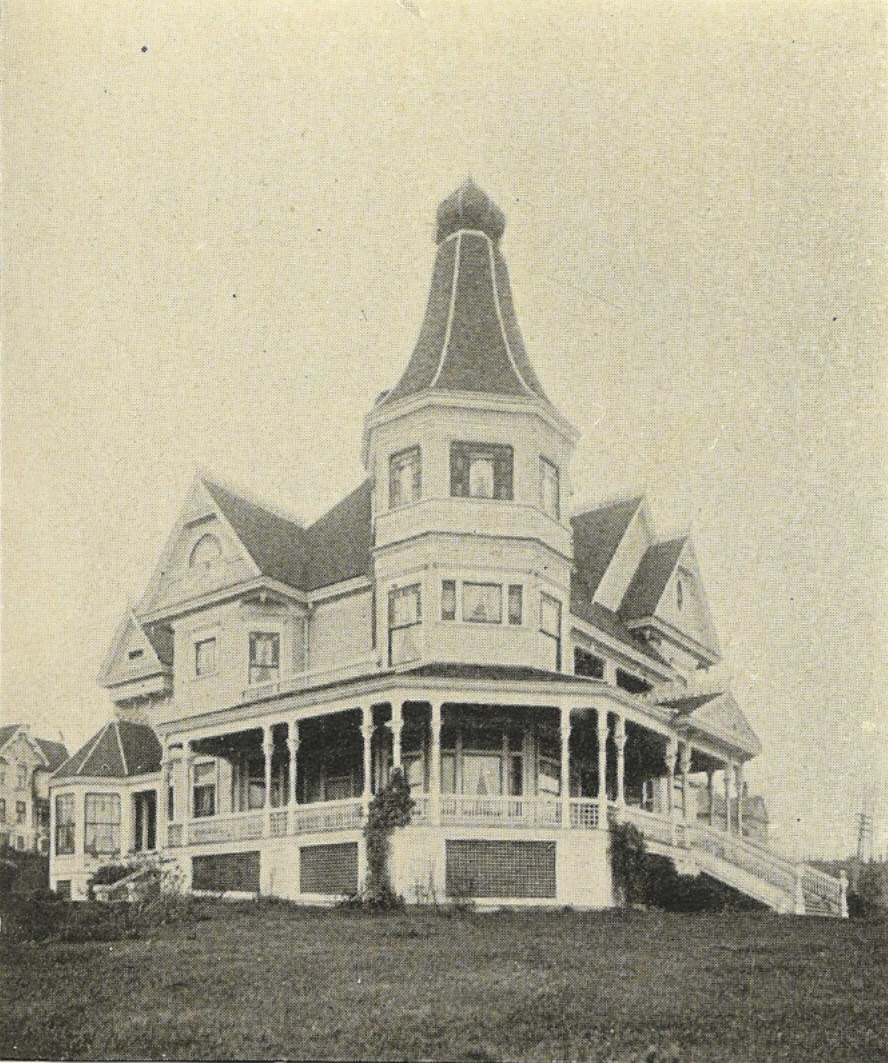
Kinnear's home on Queen Anne Hill (1900)

George Kinnear (January 30, 1836 – July 21, 1912) was an early Seattle real estate developer, responsible for some of the early residential development of Queen Anne Hill. He also had a brief military career.

He was born in Pickaway County, Ohio. His family soon moved to Tippecanoe County, Indiana, where they lived in a log cabin at Lafayette on the banks of the Wabash River. When he was three years old, his father purchased land on Flint Creek and, making his own bricks, erected a brick dwelling with a walnut interior. When Kinnear was nine, his family moved to Woodford County, Illinois, taking their livestock with them.

With the outbreak of the Civil War Kinnear joined the Forty-seventh Illinois Regiment, with which he remained until mustered out in 1864. During the war he had sent home much of his pay to his mother, intending to help her out with household expenses. She, however, had lived very modestly and invested his money, leaving him with the not inconsiderable fortune of US$3600 upon his return from service. He invested in a herd of cattle which he fed through the winter and sold at an advance the following spring, using the proceeds in the purchase of two sections of Illinois land. He not only became identified with farming interests but from 1864 until 1869 held the office of Woodford County clerk.

On retiring from the county clerkship, he concentrated his energies upon the development and cultivation of his land and, while still farming, he would purchase corn in the fall and place it in cribs, selling it when the market reached, as he believed, its high point. In the meantime, he studied conditions in the developing Pacific Northwest. His attention was first called to the Puget Sound country in 1864; he came to believe that Puget Sound would someday be home to a great city.

He made a trip to the northwest in 1874, looking over the different locations. He was most favorably impressed with the site of the fledgling Seattle and before he returned to Illinois he purchased what is now known as the G. Kinnear addition on the south side of Queen Anne Hill. Four years later, in 1878, he brought his family to the northwest. He sold his Illinois land as quickly as he could, at fifty dollars per acre, and converted the proceeds into Seattle real estate, much of which rose rapidly in value.

Clarence B. Bagley wrote of him:

…from the beginning of his residence on the Sound he did everything in his power to make known to the country the possibilities and opportunities of the northwest and to aid in the development of the city in which he had located. He favored and fostered every measure which he believed would prove of benefit to the town and country.

In 1878–1879 he labored strenuously to secure the building of a wagon road over the Snoqualmie Pass and as the organizer of the board of immigration he had several thousand pamphlets printed and sent advertisements to the newspapers throughout the country. As the result of this widespread publicity, letters requesting pamphlets arrived at the rate of one hundred or more per day. For several years after the printed supply had been exhausted the requests kept coming in.

In 1885–1886, at the time of the Anti-Chinese riots, he was one of the founders of the Home Guard, and served as its Captain, its highest officer. The Home Guard joined the Seattle Rifles, the University Cadets and (eventually) Company D of the Territorial Militia in successfully facing down the anti-Chinese rioters and preventing the forcible eviction of Seattle's Chinese residents. In 1911, shortly before his death, he published his own account of the events, which Bagley described as a "correct account of the whole anti-Chinese trouble", contrasting it to earlier "inaccurate accounts".

In 1887 he donated 14 acres of land overlooking the Sound from the west side of Queen Anne Hill to the young city; this now constitutes Kinnear Park.
