= Washington Talking Book & Braille Library =

Specialized public library in Seattle, Washington, US

- Location: 2021 Ninth Avenue, Seattle, Washington, U.S.
- Type: Special library / Public library
- Established: 1906

Collection
- Items collected: Braille books, large print books, digital cartridge books, audiobooks

Other information
- Director: Danielle Miller (Program Manager)
- Parent organization: Washington State Library

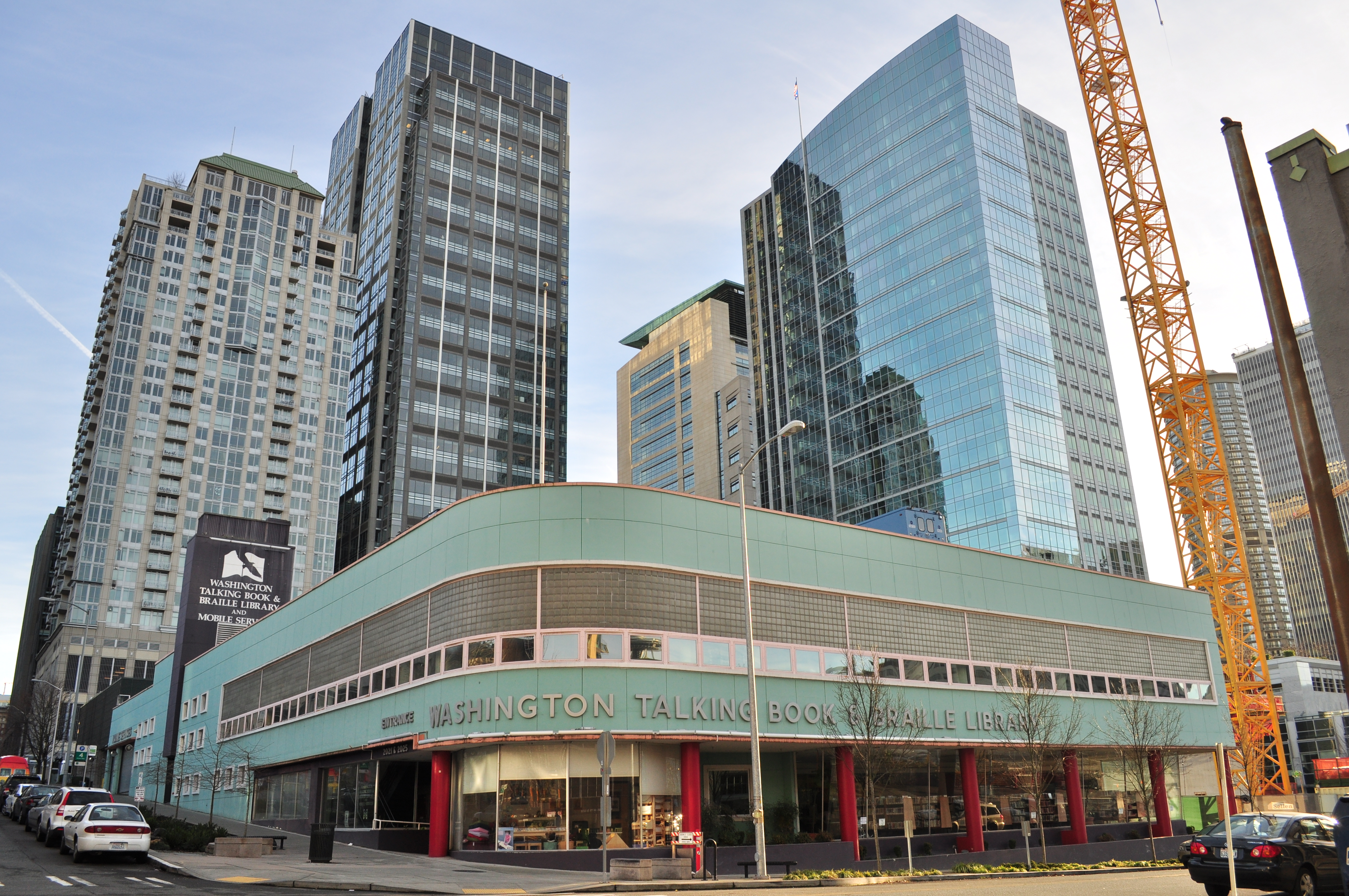
Washington Talking Book & Braille Library

The Washington Talking Book & Braille Library (WTBBL) is a specialized public library in Seattle, Washington, US, serving individuals in the State of Washington who are unable to read standard print material. It is administered by the Washington State Library. The library's collection includes large print books, Braille books, audio cassette books, and digital cartridge books. It also provides a recording service for audiobooks, a Braille service, disability-focused reference service, and a variety of youth services.

First founded in 1906 as the Braille service of the Seattle Public Library (SPL), the library has been a Washington State institution since 1975; from 1975 to 2008, SPL operated the library under a contract with the state.

== History ==
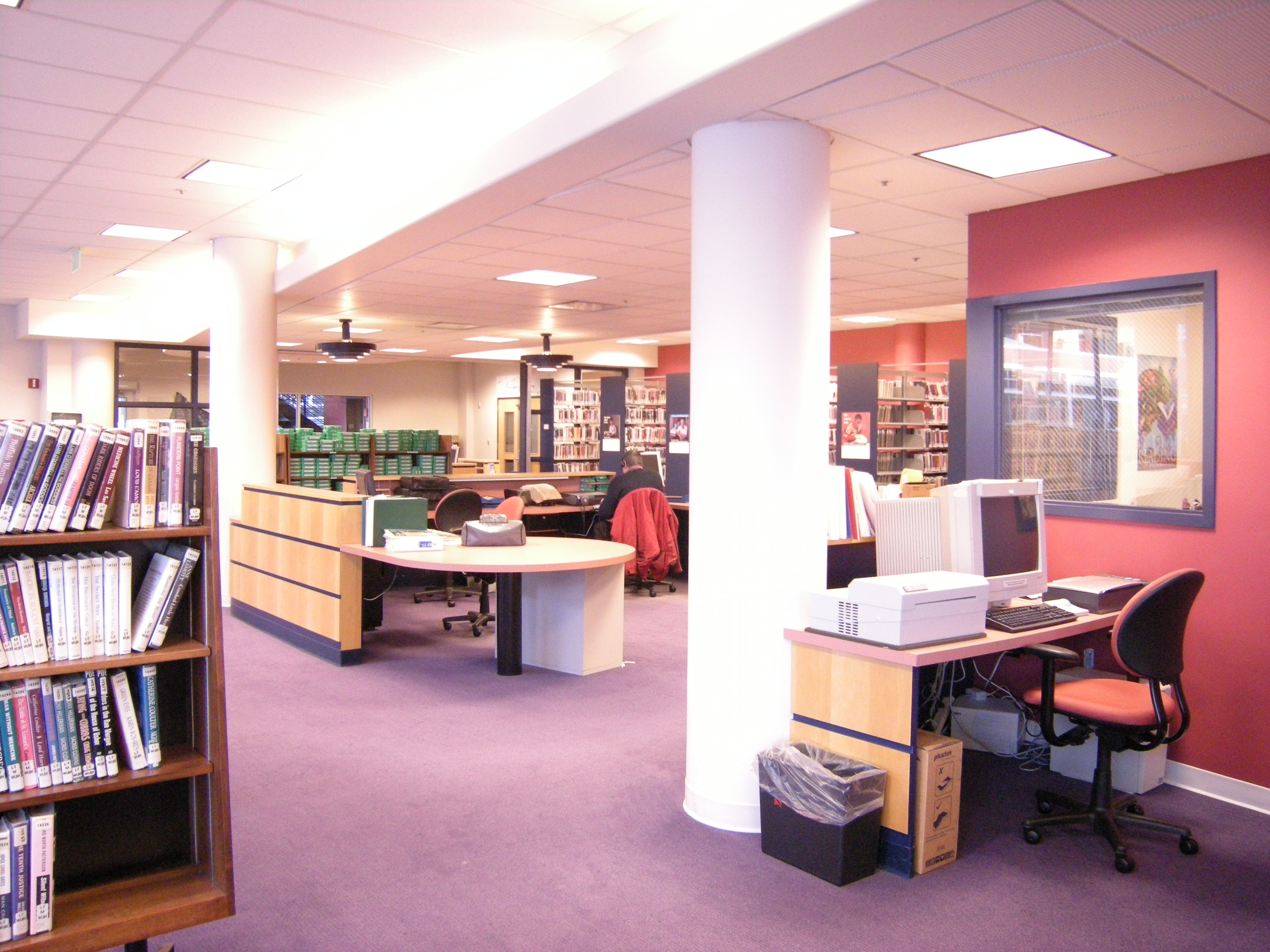
Large print books and other materials in open stacks in the public area of the library.

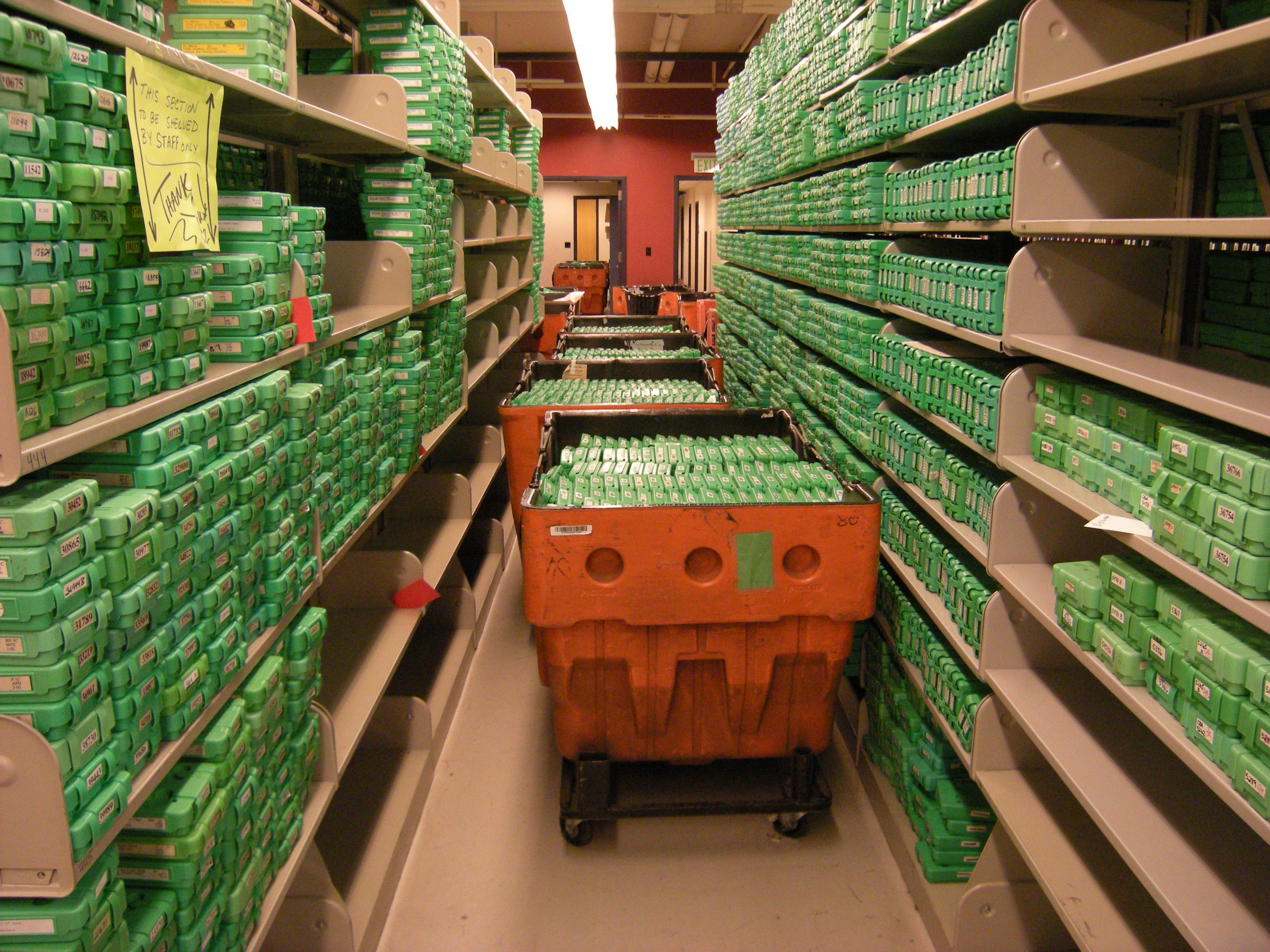
Talking books on cassette in their cases in closed stacks.

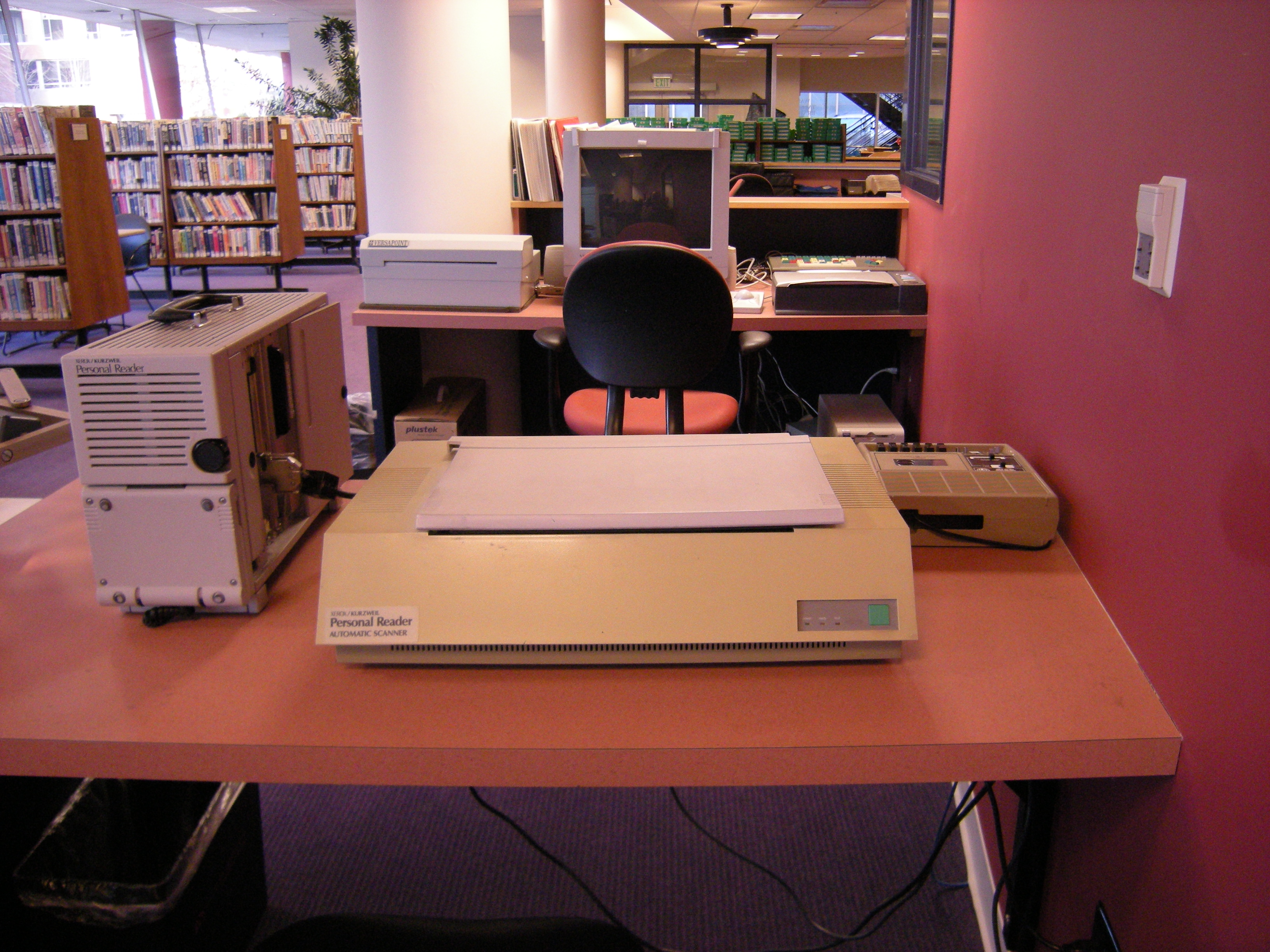
A Xerox/Kurzweil Personal Reader, which can scan and vocalize printed materials.

What is now WTBBL began in 1906 when the Seattle Public Library (SPL) introduced the first Braille service in Washington State. Early Braille transcriber groups included the Junior League, Seattle Council of Jewish Women, and the Seattle chapter of the American Red Cross. In 1919, SPL assigned Fanny Howley part-time to specific duty as a librarian to serve the blind. In 1931, under the Pratt Smoot Act, the collection became part of a national Braille and talking books network under the Library of Congress. From 1934, it served as a regional library serving Washington, Montana and Alaska. In 1968 the Montana State Library established its own talking book service, and a few years later took over Braille service for Montana residents as well. The Alaska State Library in Juneau was established as a sub-regional library in 1973 and a full regional library in July 1976, since which time WTBBL has served only Washington State.

The Library for the Blind moved in 1945 from the old downtown Carnegie Library to the Fremont branch. By 1954 it had become SPL's Division for the Blind, and moved to the basement of the Susan Henry Memorial Library on Seattle's Capitol Hill, custom-designed for the purpose.

At the beginning of 1967, the program was extended to any handicapped person certified as unable to read conventional printed materials. Accordingly, in 1973 the program became the Washington Regional Library for the Blind and Physically Handicapped. On March 12 of that year, it moved to new quarters at the King County Library building at 811 Harrison Street. 10 days later they began their Radio Talking Book Service.

In 1975 Washington State took over the funding of the library from the city of Seattle. Seattle Public Library continued to operate the library on a contract basis until July 1, 2008, when the state took over direct responsibility for its operation. The library first moved to its current location at what was then 821 Lenora Street October 1, 1983. In 1985, circulation was automated so that blind staff members could use adaptive equipment to access the system.

From July 20, 1996 to July 12, 1997, the library was located in temporary quarters nearby at 717 Virginia Street (the Love Building) so that the facility at Ninth and Lenora could be renovated and made more suitable for its purpose; among other things, the library gained indoor parking.

=== Institutional names and head librarians ===
The library began its existence in 1906 without a formal name, as a service of the Seattle Public Library. By 1945, the program had become known as the Library for the Blind; by 1954 this had become the SPL Division for the Blind. In 1973, it became the Washington Regional Library for the Blind and Physically Handicapped (WRLBPH), and in 1975 became a state-funded, rather than city-funded, library. On January 1, 1994 the present name of Washington Talking Book & Braille Library came into effect.

In 1919, Fanny Howley became the first librarian formally assigned by SPL to services for the blind; she served in this role until 1932. Drusilla Dorland served as acting head librarian from 1932 to 1937, succeeded by Stephanie Howley, head librarian from 1937 to 1952 and Florence Grannis 1952–1960. When Grannis left in 1952 to head the Iowa Library for the Blind, Marcia Finseth became head librarian and served until 1974. Sharon Hammer became regional librarian 1974–1979, seeing through the transition to state funding. Jan Ames became interim regional librarian on September 5, 1978 and January 2, 1979 became WRLBPH (later WTBBL) Director until retiring on September 29, 2002. Gloria Leonard, served as acting director December 2, 2002 to December 2, 2003; she then became director, but moved to Seattle Public Library in April 2008, as the state was taking over operation of WTBBL. From April 28, 2008, Danielle King (now Miller) has served as Program Manager at WTBBL, under the aegis of the Washington State Library and Washington State Office of Secretary of State; she retains this position as of November 2010.

== Media and services ==
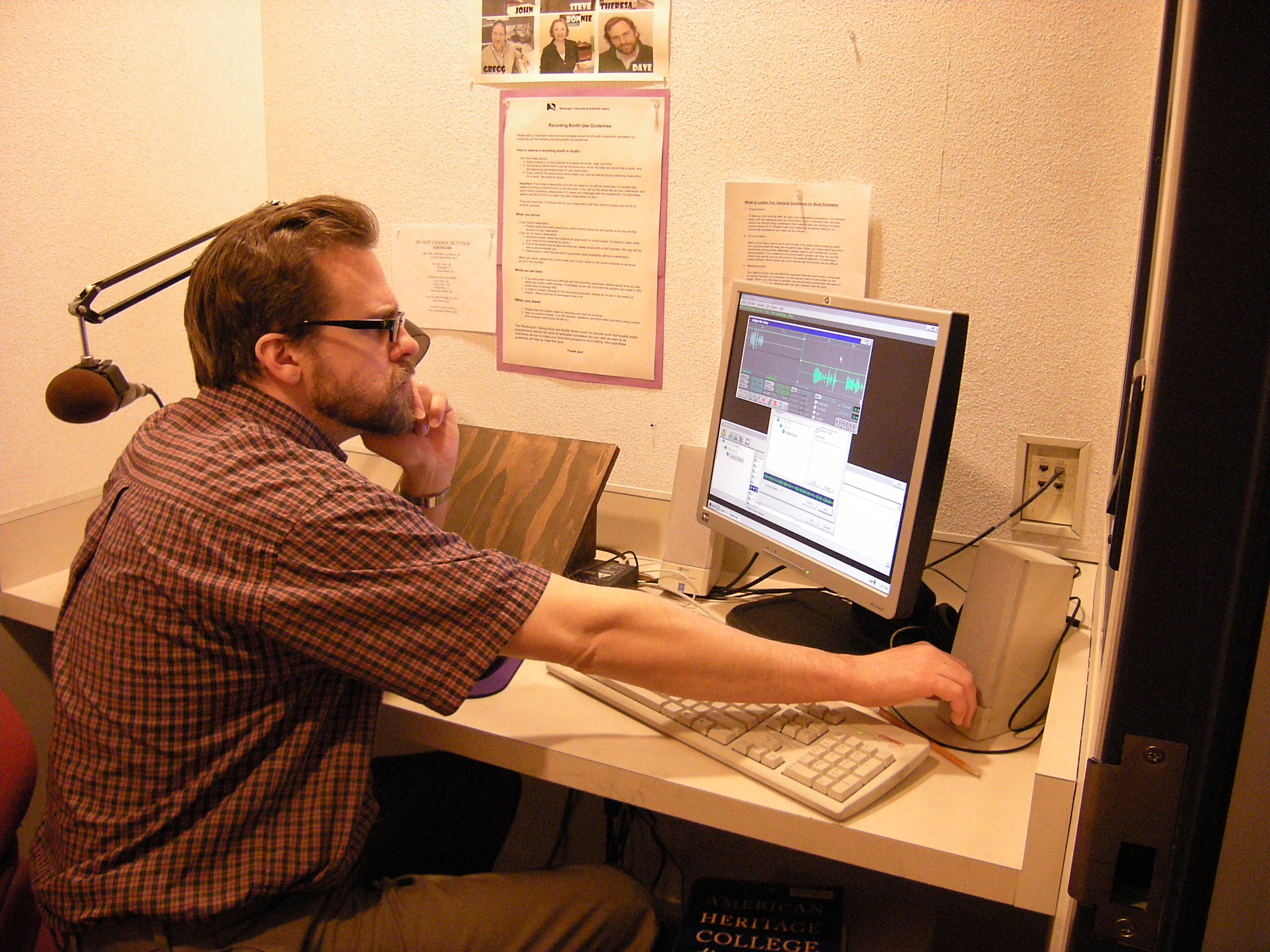
A studio for recording "talking books".

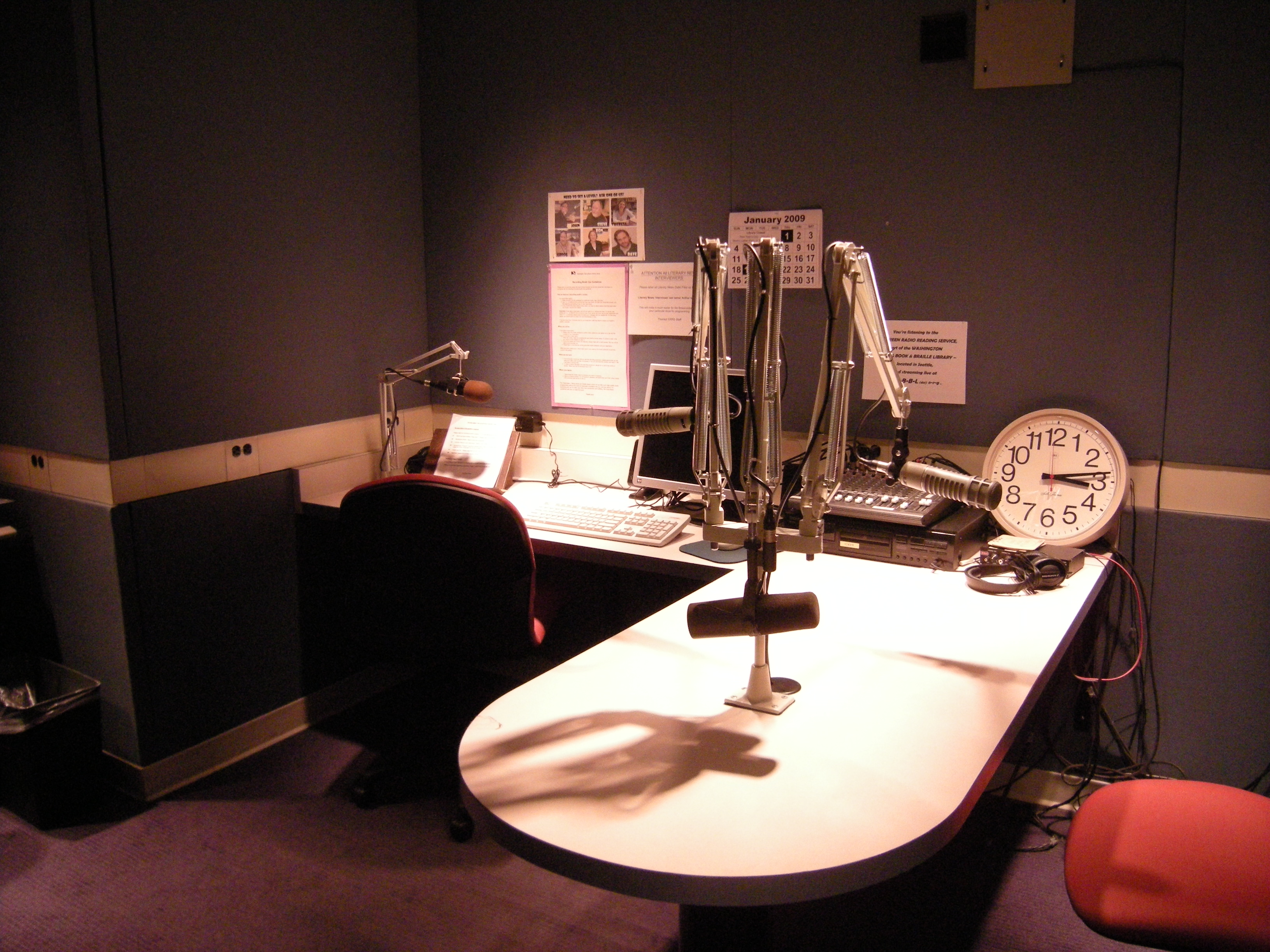
WTBBL studio

As early as 1934, the library introduced talking books on special 33 1/3 RPM phonograph records; at the time, normal records were all 78s. In 1962, 16 2/3 RPM records were introduced, and still later 8 1/3 RPM flexible discs. These formats remained in service until 2001. They were superseded because in 1969 the National Library Service had started a cassette talking book program.

The Radio Talking Book Service was founded March 22, 1973. It became the Radio Learning Service in 1977 and the Evergreen Radio Reading Service on April 25, 1983. The library began doing professional Brailling and taping services in July 1975, and "revitalized" the Braille program in 1985. The radio reading service remained in operation until August 15, 2014, when it was discontinued due to loss of funding.

A formal children's program was established in 1986.

== Current building ==
The WTBBL's two-story Streamline Moderne building at 2021 Ninth Avenue in Seattle (the corner of Ninth and Lenora Street) was previously a Dodge dealership, the anchor of Westlake Avenue's now departed auto row. The building was designed by Seattle architectural firm Naramore, Bain, Brady, and Johanson (predecessor to present-day NBBJ). The interior was remodeled in 1997 to better serve as a library.

== See also ==
- West German Audio Book Library for the Blind
- Washington Council of the Blind Newsline
