= Frequency format hypothesis =

Cognitive neuroscience concept

The frequency format hypothesis is the idea that the brain understands and processes information better when presented in frequency formats rather than a numerical or probability format. Thus according to the hypothesis, presenting information as 1 in 5 people rather than 20% leads to better comprehension. The idea was proposed by German scientist Gerd Gigerenzer, after compilation and comparison of data collected between 1976 and 1997.

== Origin ==
=== Automatic encoding ===
Certain information about one's experience is often stored in the memory using an implicit encoding process. Where did you sit last time in class? Do you say the word hello or charisma more? People are very good at answering such questions without actively thinking about it or not knowing how they got that information in the first place. This was the observation that lead to Hasher and Zacks' 1979 study on frequency.

Through their research work, Hasher and Zacks found out that information about frequency is stored without the intention of the person. Also, training and feedback does not increase ability to encode frequency. Frequency information was also found to be continually registered in the memory, regardless of age, ability or motivation. The ability to encode frequency also does not decrease with old age, depression or multiple task requirements. They called this characteristic of the frequency encoding as automatic encoding.

=== Infant study ===
Another important evidence for the hypothesis came through the study of infants. In one study, 40 newborn infants were tested for their ability to discriminate between 2 dots versus 3 dots and 4 dots versus 6 dots. Even though infants were able to make the discrimination between 2 versus 3 dots, they were not able to distinguish between 4 versus 6 dots. The tested new born infants were only 21 hours to 144 hours old.

Similarly in another study, to test whether infants could recognize numerical correspondences, Starkey et al. designed a series of experiments in which 6 to 8 month old infants were shown pairs of either a display of two objects or a display of three objects. While the displays were still visible, infants heard either two or three drumbeats. Measurement of looking time revealed that the infants looked significantly longer toward the display that matched the number of sounds.

=== The contingency rule ===
Later on, Barbara A. Spellmen from University of Texas describes the performance of humans in determining cause and effects as the contingency rule ΔP, defined as

P = P(E|C) - P(E|~C)

where P(E|C) is the probability of the effect given the presence of the proposed cause and P(E|~C) is the probability of the effect given the absence of the proposed cause. Suppose we wish to evaluate the performance of a fertilizer. If the plants bloomed 15 out of 20 times when the fertilizer was used, and only 5 out of 20 plants bloomed in the absence of the fertilizer. In this case

    P(E|C) = 15/20 = 0.75
    P(E|~C)=  5/20 = 0.25
    ΔP = P(E|C) - P(E|~C)
    ΔP = 0.75 - 0.25
       = 0.50

The ΔP value as a result is always bound between -1 and 1. Even though the contingency rule is a good model of what humans do in predicting one event causation of another, when it comes to predicting outcomes of events with multiple causes, there exists a large deviation from the contingency rule called the cue-interaction-effect.

=== Cue-interaction-effect ===
In 1993 Baker Mercer and his team used video games to demonstrate this effect. Each test subject is given the task of helping a tank travel across a mine field using a button that sometimes worked correctly in camouflaging and sometimes did not. As a second cause a spotter plane, a friend or an enemy would sometimes fly over the tank. After 40 trials, the test subjects were asked to evaluate the effectiveness of the camouflage and the plane in helping the tank through the minefield. They were asked to give it a number between -100 and 100.

Mathematically, there are two contingency values possible for the plane: the plane was either irrelevant to tank's success, then ΔP=0(.5/0 condition) and the plane was relevant to the plane's success, ΔP=1 (.5/1 condition). Even though the ΔP for the camouflage in either condition is 0.5, the test subjects evaluated the ΔP of camouflage to be much higher in the .5/0 condition than in the .5/1 condition. The results are shown in table below.

Condition	ΔP_{plane}	ΔP_{camouflage}	Camouflage rating given
0.5/0	0	.5	49
0.5/1	1	.5	-6

In each case, the test subjects are very good in noticing when two events occur together. When the plane is relevant to the camouflage success, they mark the camouflage success high and when the plane doesn't affect the camouflage's success, they mark the camouflage's success value low.

=== Gigerenzer contributions ===
Several experiments have been performed that shows that ordinary and sometimes skilled people make basic probabilistic fallacies, especially in the case of Bayesian inference quizzes. Gigerenzer claims that the observed errors are consistent with the way we acquired mathematical abilities during the course of human evolution. Gigerenzer argues that the problem with these quizzes is the way the information is presented. During these quizzes the information is presented in percentages. Gigerenzer argues that presenting information in frequency format would help in solving these puzzles accurately. He argues that evolutionary the brain physiologically evolved to understand frequency information better than probability information. Thus if the Bayesian quizzes were asked in frequency format, then test subjects would be better at it. Gigerenzer calls this idea the frequency format hypothesis in his published paper titled "The psychology of good judgment: frequency formats and simple algorithms".

== Supporting arguments ==
=== Evolutionary perspective ===
Gigerenzer argued that from an evolutionary point of view, a frequency method was easier and more communicable compared to conveying information in probability format. He argues that probability and percentages are rather recent forms of representation as opposed to frequency. The first known existence of a representative form of percentages is in the seventeenth century. He also argues that more information is given in the case of frequency representation. For instance, conveying data as 50 out of 100, using the frequency form, as opposed to saying 50%, using the probability format, gives the users more information about the sample size. This can in turn make the data and results more reliable and more appealing.

=== Elaborate encoding ===
An explanation given as to why people choose encounter frequency is that in the case of frequencies, the subjects are given vivid descriptions, while with probabilities only a dry number is given to the subject. Therefore, in the case of frequency, subjects are given more recall cues. This could in turn mean that the frequency encounters are remembered by the brain more often than in the case of probability numbers. Thus this might be a reason why people in general intuitively choose frequency encountered choices rather than probability based choices.

=== Sequential input ===
Yet another explanation offered by the authors is the fact that in the case of frequency, people often come across them multiple times and have a sequential input, compared to a probability value, which is given in one time. From John Medina’s Brain Rules, sequential input can lead to a stronger memory than a onetime input. This can be a primary reason why humans choose frequency encounters over probability.

=== Easier storage ===
Another rationale provided in justifying the frequency format hypothesis is that using frequencies makes it easier to keep track and update a database of events. For example, if an event happened 3 out of 6 times, the probability format would store this as 50%, whereas in frequency format it is stored as 3 out of 6. Now imagine that the event does not happen this time. The frequency format can be updated to 3 out of 7. However, for the probability format updating is extremely harder.

=== Classifying information ===
Frequency representation can also be helpful in keeping track of classes and statistical information. Picture a scenario where every 500 out of 1000 people die due to lung cancer. However, 40 of those 1000 were smokers and 20 out of the 40 had a genetic condition predisposed to possible lung cancer. Such class division and information storage can only be done using frequency format, since a number .05% probability of having lung cancer does not give any information or allow to calculate such information.

== Refuting arguments ==
=== Nested-sets hypothesis ===
Frequency-format studies tend to share a confound -- namely that when presenting frequency information, the researchers also make clear the reference class they are referring to. For example, consider these three different ways to formulate the same problem:

Probability Format

"Consider a test to detect a disease that a given American has a 1/1000 chance of getting. An individual that does not have the disease has a 50/1000 chance of testing positive. An individual that does have the disease will definitely test positive.

What is the chance that a person found to have a positive result actually has the disease, assuming that you nothing about the person’s symptoms or signs? _____%"

Frequency Format

"One out of every 1000 Americans has disease X. A test has been developed to detect when a person has disease X. Every time the test is given to a person who has the disease, the test comes out positive. But sometimes the test also comes out positive when it is given to a person who is completely healthy. Specifically, out of every 1000 people who are perfectly healthy, 50 of them test positive for the disease.

Imagine we have assembled a random sample of 1000 Americans. They were selected by lottery. Those who conducted the lottery had no information about the health status of any of these people.

Given the information above, on average, how many people who test positive for the disease actually have the disease? _____out of_____."

Probability Format Highlighting Set-Subset Structure of the Problem

"The prevalence of disease X among Americans is 1/1000. A test has been developed to detect when a person has disease X. Every time the test is given to a person who has the disease, the test comes out positive. But sometimes the test also comes out positive when it is given to a person who is completely healthy. Specifically, the chance is 50/1000 that someone who is perfectly healthy would test positive for the disease.

Imagine we have just given the test to a random sample of Americans. They were selected by lottery. Those who conducted the lottery had no information about the health status of any of these people.

What is the chance that a person found to have a positive result actually has the disease? _____%"

All three problems make clear the set of 1/1000 Americans who have the disease and that the test has perfect sensitivity (100% of people with the disease will receive a positive test) and that 50/1000 healthy people will receive a positive test (e.g., false positives). However, the latter two formats additionally highlights the separate classes within the population (e.g., positive test (with disease/without disease), negative test (without disease)), and therefore makes it easier for people to choose the correct class (people with a positive test) to reason with (thus generating something close to the correct answer—1/51/~2%.) Both frequency and Probability format highlighting set-subset structures lead to similar rates of correct answers, whereas the probability format alone leads to fewer correct answers (as people are likely to rely on the incorrect class in this case.) Research has also shown that one can reduce performance in the frequency format by disguising the set-subset relationships in the problem (just as in the standard probability format), thus demonstrating that it is not, in fact, the frequency format, but instead, the highlighting of the set-subset structure that improves judgments.

=== Ease of comparison ===
Critics of the frequency format hypothesis argue that probability formats allow for much easier comparison than frequency format representation of data. In some cases, using frequency formats actually does allow for easy comparison. If team A wins 19 of its 29 games, and another team B wins 10 of its 29 games, one can clearly see that team A is much better than team B. However comparison in frequency format is not always this clear and easy. If team A won 19 out of its 29 games, comparing this team with team B that won 6 out of its 11 games becomes much harder in frequency format. But, in the probability format, one could say since 65.6%(19/29) is greater than 54.5%, one could much easily compare the two.

=== Memory burden ===
Tooby and Cosmides had argued that frequency representation helps update data easier each time one gets new data. However this involves updating both numbers. Referring back to the example of teams, if team A won its 31st game, note that both the number of games won(20->21) and the number of games played(30->31) has to be updated. In the case of probability the only number to be updated is the single percentage number. Also, this number could be updated over the course of 10 games instead of updating each game, which cannot be done in the case of frequency format.
