= Da Vinci Arts Middle School =

Middle school in Portland, Oregon, U.S.

Coordinates: 45.52467°N 122.64024°W

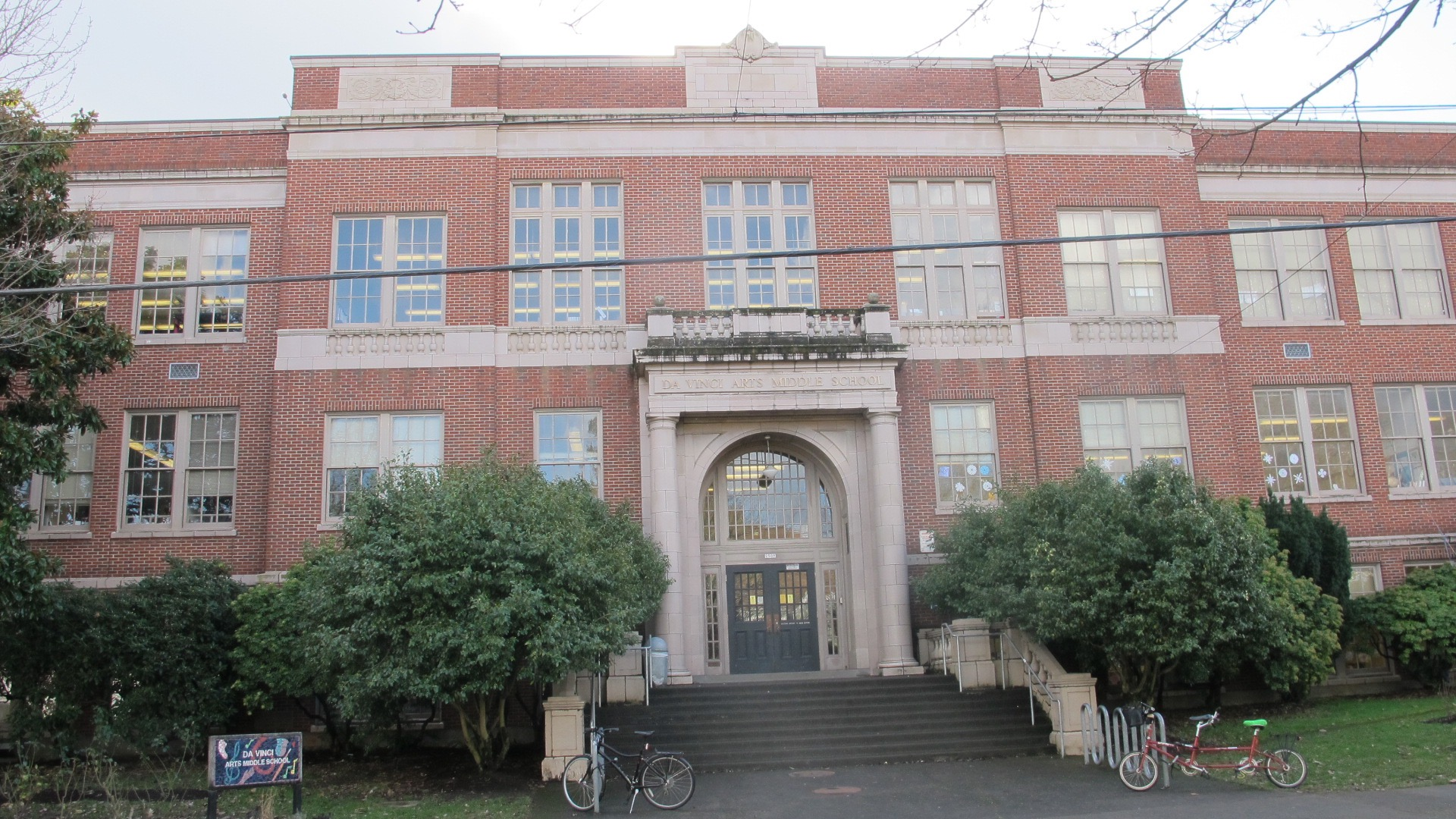
The front entrance of da Vinci Arts Middle School

da Vinci Arts Middle School, also known as da Vinci Middle School, is a public middle school in the Kerns neighborhood of Portland, Oregon, in the United States. It is an arts-focused school in the Portland Public School District. The building was originally used as a high school called Girls Polytechnic High School, then renamed James Monroe High School in 1967. The school closed in fall 1978 when its student body was merged into Washington High School.

== History ==
The building was designed to house the Girls Polytechnic High School by architect George Howell Jones in the classical revival style. Jones designed almost all of the schools in the Portland public school district between 1908 and 1932, along with Floyd Naramore. Before the building's construction, the Girls Polytechnic program had been held at the Portland High School, which was deemed unfit in 1928. It remained the Girls Polytechnic until 1967, when it was renamed James Monroe High School, for president James Monroe, and opened to boys.

In 1993, parents of students at Buckman Arts Magnet Elementary School formed a proposal for an arts-focused middle school. The district eventually accepted the proposal, and the school opened in 1996 with 140 students and a very small staff. It was not until 1998 that the school had a full-time principal, and there was no counselor until 2000. Initially, da Vinci had been a program that shared the building with other programs, but in July 2003 the school board changed da Vinci's status into a school, and it has remained a school since then.

Due to concerns about low mathematics and science test scores, da Vinci's schedule was changed in fall 2016 to allow for increased class time in those subjects. Students protested against these changes, on the basis that students would no longer have the same teacher for language arts and social studies for all three years of middle school. There was also concern that sixth graders would be instructed in separate classes from the rest of the school in all subjects except art and that the new schedule might disrupt the sense of community within the core classes. The schedule change went into effect in September 2015.

== Curriculum ==
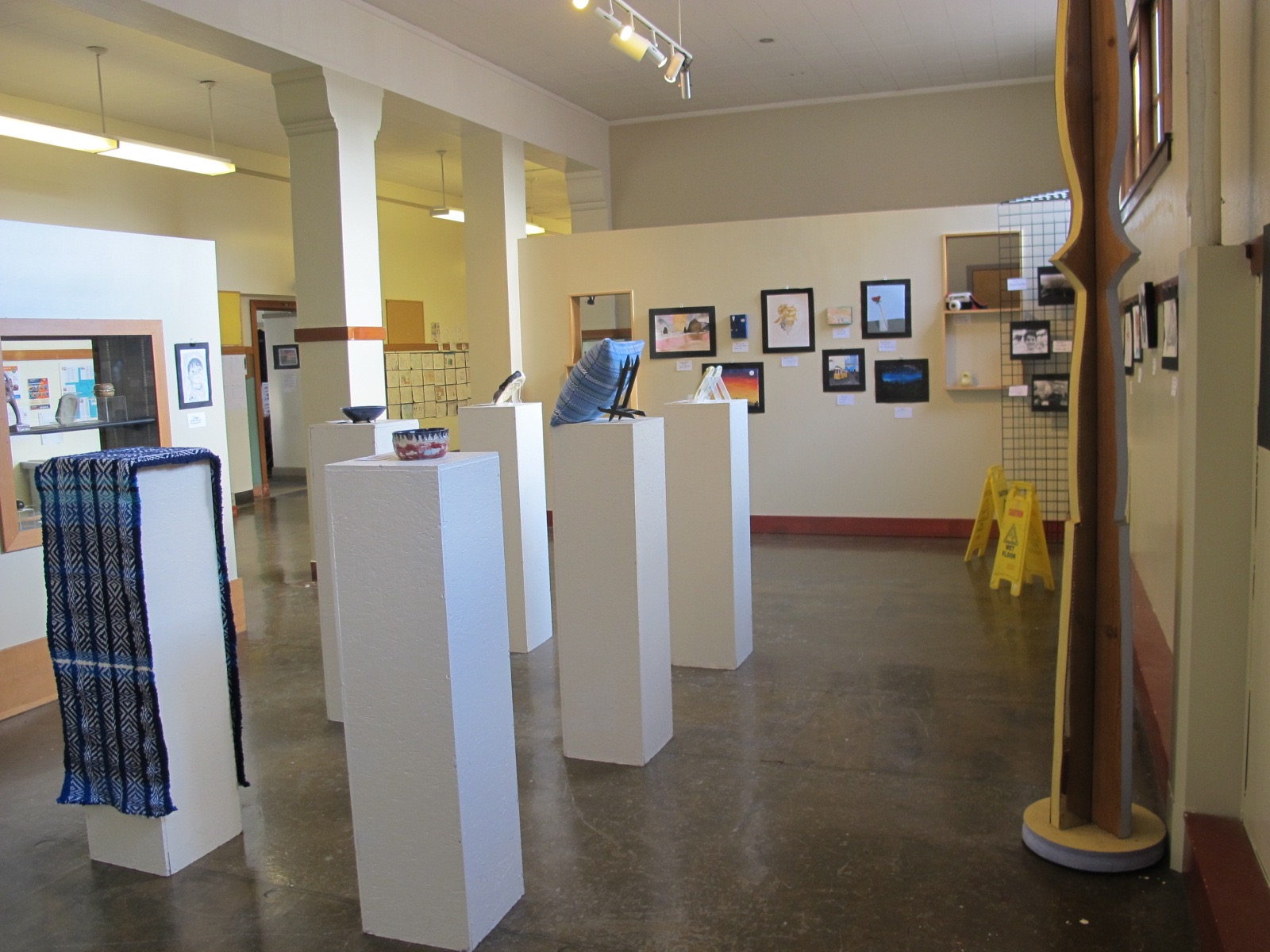
The art gallery at da Vinci Arts Middle School, displaying student artwork

Da Vinci Arts Middle School is an arts magnet school. It offers students two electives of 2D art, 3D art, creative writing, dance, music or drama.

== Extracurricular activities ==
The school has many after-school programs, such the Destino dance team, a rock band known as Trogdor, a Black Student Union, a Queer-Straight Alliance, a ukulele choir, a jazz ensemble and a chess club. The school has put on numerous plays, as well as three student-written rock operas. There is also a coding club.

== Notable alumni ==
- Jinkx Monsoon, drag queen, actor and singer.
