= Jean Johanson =

American jewelry designer (1911–2000)

- Born: Jean Louise P. Johanson; October 3, 1911; Spokane, Washington
- Died: March 1, 2000 (aged 88)
- Occupations: Sculptor, mosaic artist, and jewelry designer

Jean Louise P. Johanson (October 3, 1911 – March 1, 2000) was an American sculptor, mosaic artist, and jewelry designer.

== Early years and education ==
Johanson was born in Spokane, Washington in 1911. She was a student of sculptor Dudley Pratt, Ruth Penington and Walter Isaacs, and took two summer classes with Alexander Archipenko during his visits to the University of Washington in the 1930s. She graduated from the University of Washington in 1934.

In 1936, Johanson married the architect Perry Johanson, a co-founder of the Northwest architecture firm NBBJ.

== Career ==
Johanson and her husband moved to Hilltop in the early 1950s. She had a solo show at the Seattle Art Museum in 1944 and won numerous gallery awards during her career. In 1948 she made the sculpture “Spirit of Medicine” in collaboration with Dudley Pratt, which is located at the Health Sciences building on the University of Washington campus. In 1966 she made a metal fountain which is displayed at Westlake Square. She produced sculptural ornament for several buildings in the Seattle metropolitan area.

She produced freestanding works as well, including a bronze fountain installed at Seattle's Westlake Center. She was also known for her pebble mosaics. Her mosaic-works are shown at the Unitarian Church in Bellevue, Nordstrom's Department Store in Seattle, Holy Family Church in Kirkland and Broadmoor Golf Club in Seattle. Joseph Young called her "among the foremost in the use of sandcast pebble mosaics". Her mosaic "Men Come and Go Like Waves of the Sea," named after a quotation attributed to Chief Seattle, is installed at the Pacific Science Center in Seattle, Washington.

In the 1970s and 1980s she concentrated on creating jewelry of natural materials.

== Death ==
Johanson died at the age of 88 of Alzheimer's disease.

== Exhibitions ==
- New York World's Fair (1939)
- National Exhibition of American Artists in New York (1936)
- Seattle Art Museum (1936–1938, one artist show in 1944)

== Bibliography ==
- Beers, Carole. "Jean Louise Johanson, Seattle artist." Seattle [Washington] Times, night final edition, March 5, 2000.
- Moore, Bernice Starr (1947), Art in Our Community, Caxton, p. 163, ISBN 978-1199520814.
- Seattle Arts Commission, A Field Guide to Seattle's Public Art, Seattle Arts Commission, 1991 ASIN B01F827N4U
- Young, Joseph (1963), Mosaics: Principles and Practice, Reinhold, p. 66, ASIN B0007E345M.
- Graduation date from death notice in Columns: The University of Washington alumni magazine, June 2000.
