= Social–emotional learning =

Education practice

SEL Framework identified by CASEL as the "CASEL Wheel"

Social and emotional learning (SEL) is an educational method that claims to be able to foster social and emotional skills in school curricula. SEL is also referred to as "social-emotional learning," "socio-emotional learning," or "social–emotional literacy." Ideally, this is implemented to the same degree as other subjects, such as math, science, and reading. Furthermore, SEL purports to prepare students to become knowledgeable, responsible, and caring members of society when they reach adulthood.

There is no scientific evidence that SEL achieves any of these goals due to heavy reliance on self-reporting, not taking into account confounding factors, and lack of controls.

At the same time, SEL has become increasingly controversial among conservatives since 2020.

Many studies continue to be conducted, examining the impact of social emotional learning in the school curriculum.

== History ==
SEL began in the 1960s at the Yale School of Medicine in its Child Study Center. There, Professor James Comer started the Comer School Development Program where he focused on the education systems of low-income African-American communities, particularly the elementary schools in New Haven, Connecticut due to their poor academic report cards. The school implemented programs that focused on the social and emotional needs of the students. The approach spread to the New Haven public schools due to their proximity to Yale University.

Roger Weissberg, Timothy Shriver, researchers, and educators established the New Haven Social Development program in 1987. The Collaborative for Academic, Social, and Emotional Learning (CASEL) was founded in 1994, and participants published Promoting Social and Emotional Learning: Guidelines for Educators in 1997.

In 2019, the concept of Transformative Social and Emotional Learning (Transformative SEL, TSEL or T-SEL) was developed. Transformative SEL aims to guide students to "critically examine root causes of inequity, and to develop collaborative solutions that lead to personal, community, and societal well-being." In 2020, CASEL updated the definition of SEL to include a stronger focus on equity, and added information about Transformative SEL as one form of SEL implementation that can focus on equity. Some emerging technologies may help educators in SEL programs.

== Components ==
CASEL defines the five main components of SEL as:

1. Self-awareness: The skill of having knowledge of one's own emotions and developing a positive self-concept.
2. Self-management: The ability to regulate one's own emotions and monitor one's own behaviors. This also pertains to intrinsic motivation and setting personal goals.
3. Social awareness: The ability to have awareness of the emotions and social situations of others.
4. Relationship skills: The skill to foster relationships and communicate within them.
5. Responsible decision-making: The ability to solve problems and hold one's self accountable.

CASEL also defines what it calls the best methods for implementing SEL at different levels, such as classrooms, schools, families and caregivers, and communities. These ideas are intended to help students to live socially and emotionally healthy lives both during and after their time in the school system, improving academic performance by reducing stress.

== Benefits ==
According to Ammar Al-Ghabban, an independent education consultant, SEL fosters empathy and compassion, and is imperative for a successful school that effectively supports the mental wellbeing of staff and students. Speaking on the importance of empathy, molecular biologist John Medina states that the more empathy training students as well as teachers get, the better their grades will become. He says that it is important to make the classroom feel like a safe place for students to learn.

Studies have shown that programs such as SPARK have been a tool for schools with a diverse population to introduce and encourage SEL skills.

The implementation of SEL is shown to be statistically associated with improving the social dynamics of schools by decreasing physical aggression and reducing bullying of students with disabilities. SEL is statistically linked with improving academic performance by 11 percentiles. Additionally, the implementation of SEL programs in schools as early as kindergarten is associated with decreasing likelihood of students growing up to use public housing, having involvement with the police, or spending time in a detention facility. In 2026, a systematic review of 104 randomized controlled trials examining mindfulness interventions among children and adolescents in school or community settings found that these programs provide small short-term benefits compared with no intervention. Benefits differed by age group: improved behavior and social skills among children aged 3-8 years, better attention regulation and slightly lower anxiety among those aged 9-14 years, and reduced symptoms of anxiety and depression among adolescents aged 15-18 years. However, mindfulness did not appear to outperform other structured programs such as social-emotional learning or health education. The authors also noted that there is no clear evidence that the benefits persist beyond 6 to 12 months when interventions are delivered as one-off or time-limited programs.

Proponents of SEL say it helps students to understand and control their emotions as well as learn to accept and understand the emotions of their classmates as they navigate through their educational careers. SEL is said to be important for teachers to understand and demonstrate in their classrooms in order to make the learning process more natural and easier to adjust to for students. Things like responsible decision making and positive relationship building are much easier to learn for students who are constantly exposed to examples of the behavior. When SEL is woven into lessons and the school environment, students relate better to the content, are more motivated to learn, and understand the curriculum more easily. Proponents say SEL can also lead to students learning important skills for the workplace as well, like teamwork, time management, and communication skills. Despite this, only three states (Illinois, Kansas, and Pennsylvania) have SEL standards for their K–12 curriculum.

== Controversies ==
=== Conservative opposition ===
Some conservative publications claim that social-emotional learning is a "Trojan horse" for bringing in critical race theory, sexual orientation, gender identity, and left-wing politics to the classroom. Robert Pondiscio of the right-leaning think tank the American Enterprise Institute claims SEL changes "the role of the teacher, from a pedagogue to something more closely resembling a psychotherapist, social worker, or member of the clergy - no less concerned with a child's beliefs, attitudes and values." Those opposed to SEL have cited CASEL's 2020 initiative, "Transformative SEL", as further evidence that SEL has left-wing political overtones; "Transformative SEL" lists among its goals "interrogating social norms, disrupting and resisting inequities, and co-constructing equitable and just solutions."

=== Privacy and information collection concerns ===
In some school districts, students are asked to enter their current mood or feelings into an app every day, as part of the social-emotional learning curriculum. This has caused some to worry about parents being excluded from the process, as well as about the protection of students' privacy.

== Policy ==
=== Support ===
U.S. congressman Tim Ryan introduced H.R.4626 - Social Emotional Learning for Families Act of 2019 (SELF Act) on 18 October 2019 in the 116th Congress. The purpose of this bill was to create a grant program that supports the creation and implementation of a program in schools that helps to develop social and emotional habits. This bill was cosponsored only by Representative Debbie Mucarsel-Powell.

=== Opposition ===
In February 2022, Oklahoma senator Shane Jett proposed a bill in the state legislature which aims to prohibit public and charter schools from promoting or applying SEL concepts using public or private funds.

In April 2022, the Florida Department of Education (FDOE) published a list of mathematics instructional materials that aligned with the state's Benchmarks for Excellent Student Thinking (BEST) standards. Among the submitted textbooks for FDOE review, 41% were rejected for a variety of reasons including the "unsolicited addition" of SEL in mathematics.
