= Dudley Pratt =

American sculptor (1897–1975)

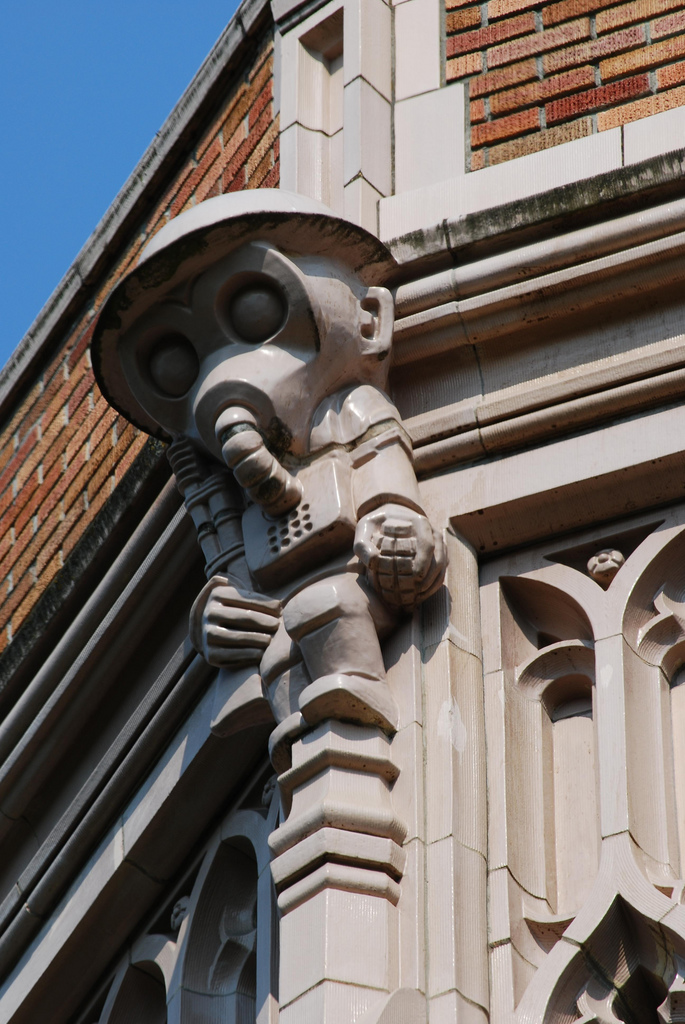
A "grotesque" by Dudley Pratt on Smith Hall at the University of Washington.

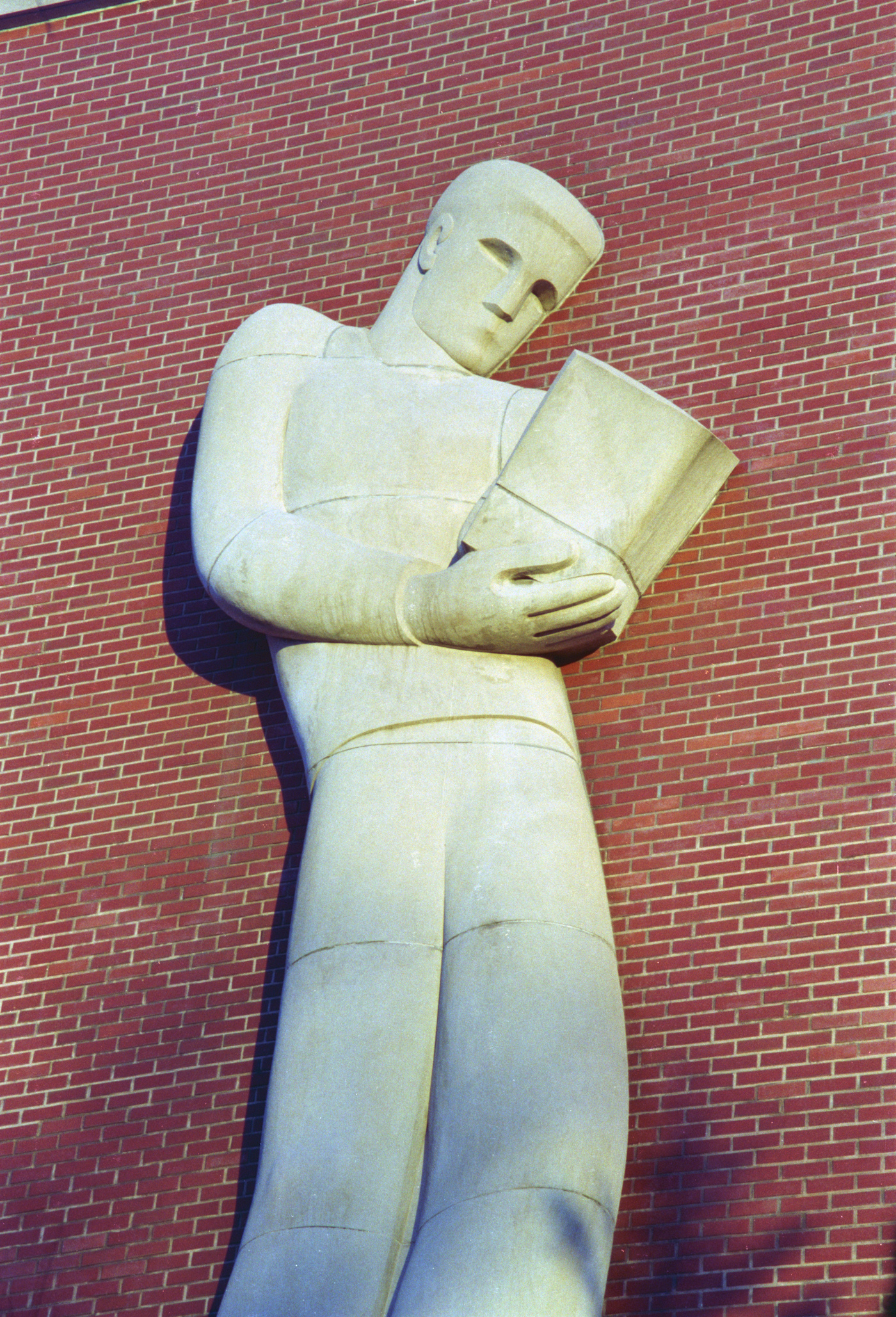
The Reader on the exterior of Washington State University's Holland Library.

Dudley Pratt (June 14, 1897 – November 18, 1975) was an American sculptor. He was born in Paris, France to Boston sculptors Bela and Helen Pratt. His sculptural education included study under Charles Grafly, Antoine Bourdelle, and Alexander Archipenko.

Pratt married fellow sculptor Virginia Claflin while they were students at the School of the Boston Museum of Fine Arts. The couple moved to Seattle in 1925, and Pratt began teaching at the University of Washington's School of Art. After Virginia's death in 1952, Pratt relocated to Croton Falls, New York, where he met and married the painter Colette (Finch) Halvorsen. In 1965, the Pratts moved to San Miguel de Allende, Mexico; Pratt died there in 1975.

Pratt's major work includes sculpture for several buildings on the University of Washington's Seattle campus (Hutchinson Hall, the Henry Art Gallery, Smith Hall, More Hall, Gerberding Hall, and the University of Washington Medical Center), as well as sculpture for the Hoquiam City Hall, the Bellingham City Hall, the Everett Public Library in Everett, Washington, and the former Doctors Hospital in Seattle, now part of the Virginia Mason Medical Center campus. His 14-foot-tall (4.3 m) Carrara marble Gold Star Mother was a central part of the World War II memorial on the 1949 Seattle Public Safety Building by NBBJ, and his limestone The Reader adorns Holland Library on the Washington State University campus in Pullman, Washington. He sculpted many freestanding works as well, four of which are in the collection of the Seattle Art Museum. His students included sculptors George Tsutakawa and Jean Johanson.
