= George Howell Jones =

American architect (1887–1950)

Architect of Portland Public Schools
- In office 1920–1934
- Preceded by: Floyd Naramore
- Succeeded by: Position abolished

Personal details
- Born: George Howell Jones; May 24, 1887 Portland, Oregon, U.S.
- Died: January 9, 1950 (aged 62) Portland, Oregon, U.S.
- Spouse: Maude Adell Hill
- Children: 1
- Education: Oregon State College; Massachusetts Institute of Technology
- Military career
- Allegiance: United States
- Branch: United States Army
- Rank: Lieutenant
- Unit: American Expeditionary Forces
- Conflicts: World War I

George Howell Jones (1887–1950) was an American architect. He is most notable for being appointed the Architect of Portland Public Schools and designing most of their buildings in the 1920s and 1930s.

== Early life and education ==
George Jones was born on May 24, 1887 in Portland, Oregon to Thomas J. Jones and Janet Bowen. His father was also a Portland architect, and designed some of the early school buildings in Portland. Jones went to the Massachusetts Institute of Technology, where he graduated with a degree in architecture in 1913. His thesis was "a design for a building for the supreme court of the United States." In college, he was a member of Delta Upsilon.

== Career ==
Once he had graduated, he worked for the firm York and Sawyer, and was a lieutenant in the U. S. Army Combat Engineers. He also worked for the firm Crow, Lewis, and Wick. Between 1920 and 1934, Jones was hired as the Architect for Portland School District No. 1, replacing Floyd Naramore. Throughout his and Naramore's tenures, they designed over twenty new schools.

Jones was a member of the American Institute of Architects from 1938 to 1942. By 1940, he had moved on to working in a partnership with Harold Dickson Marsh, as a firm known as Jones & Marsh.

== Personal life ==
Jones died from a heart attack in his Laurelhurst home on January 9, 1950. He was a Freemasonry, and a member of both the Scottish Rite and the Shriners.

== Gallery ==
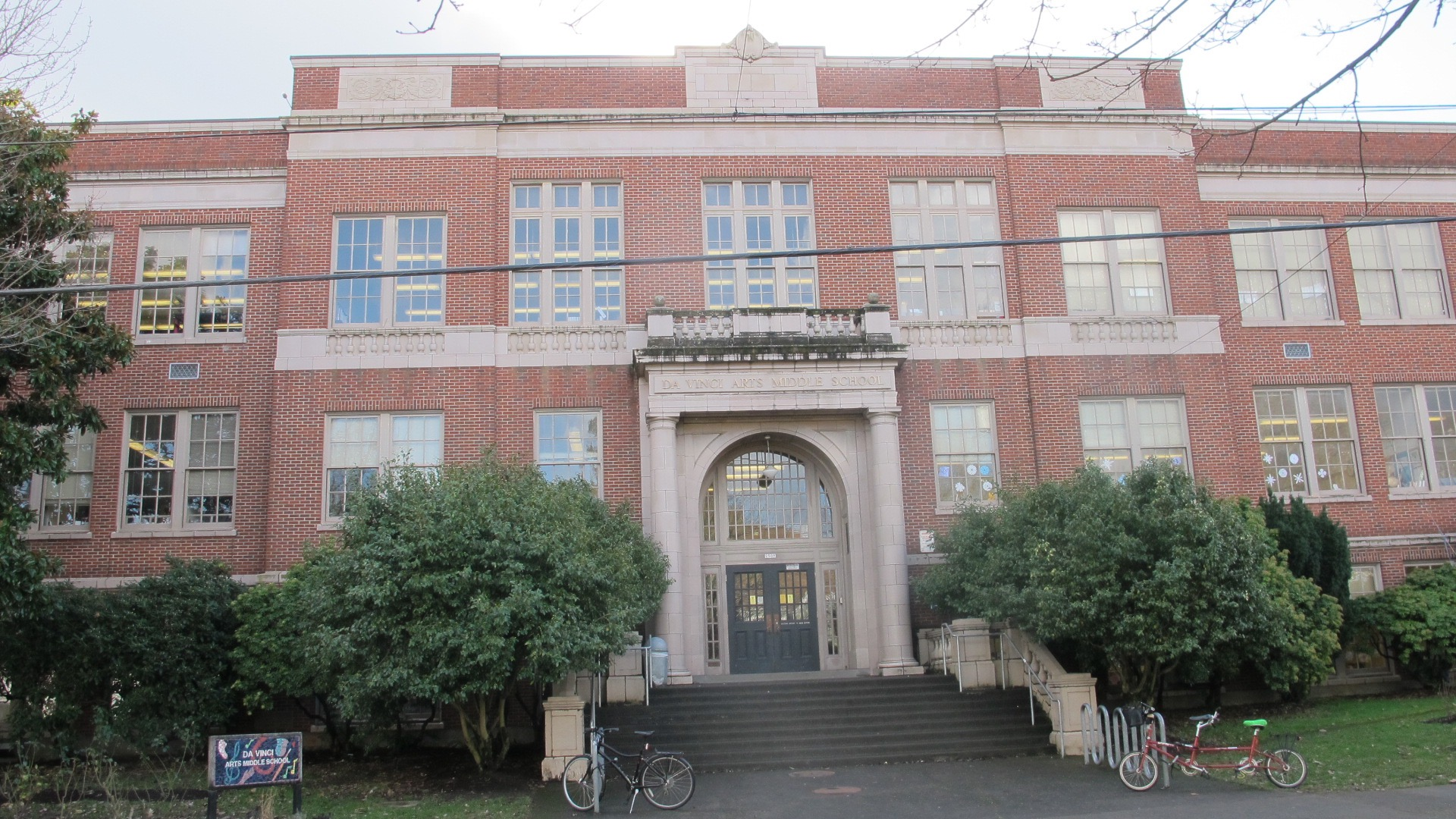
Da Vinci Arts Middle School (formerly Girl's Polytechnic High School), Portland

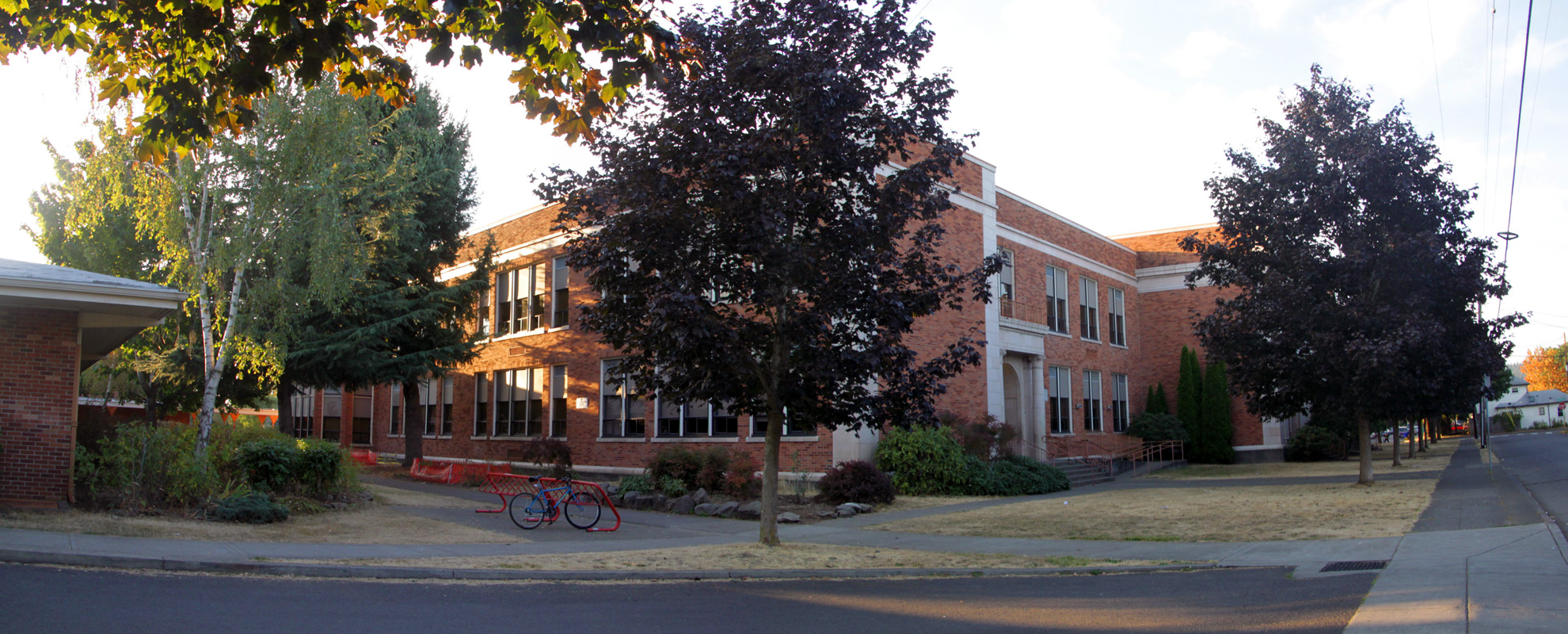
Arleta K-8 School, Portland

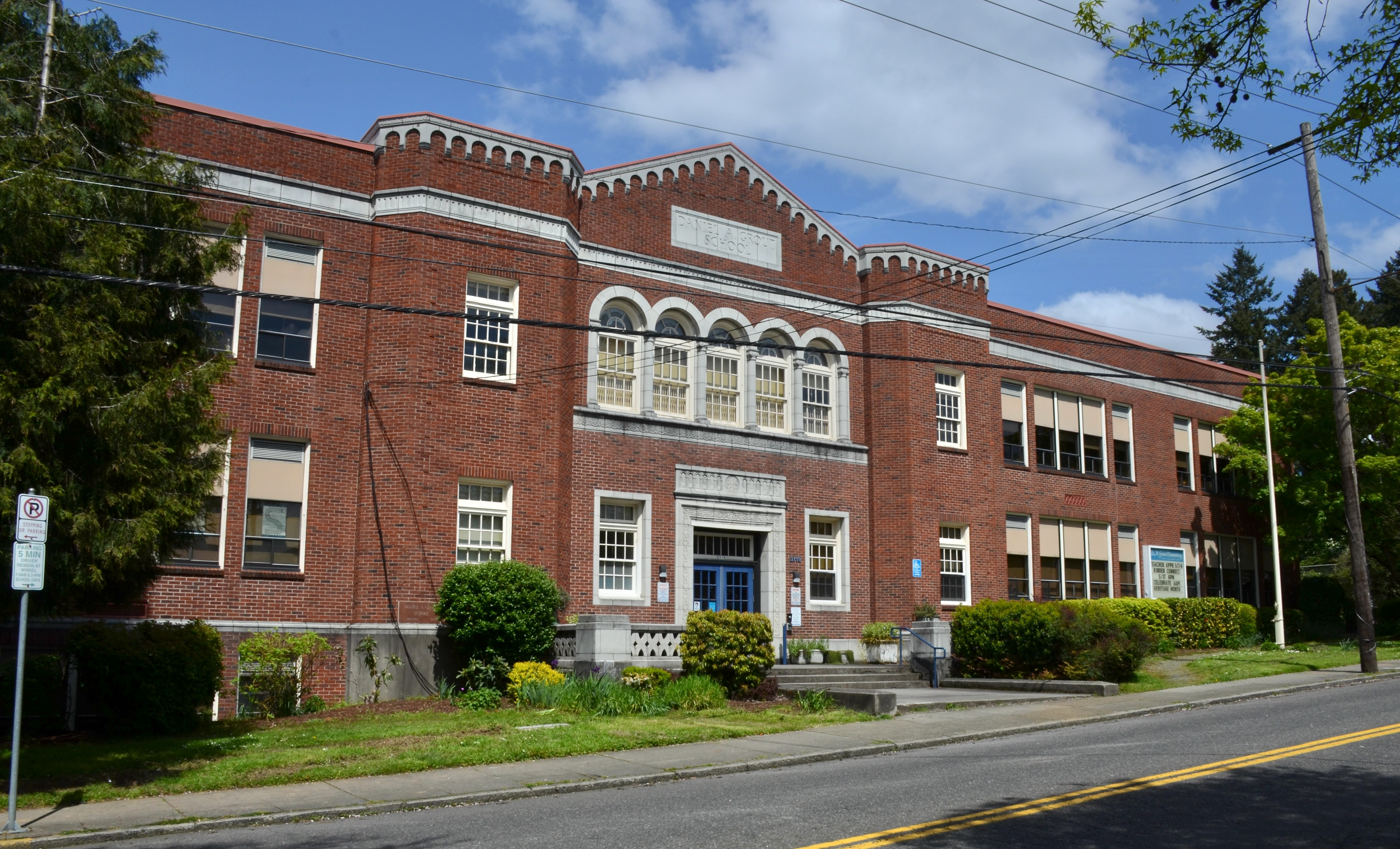
Daniel A. Grout Elementary School, Portland

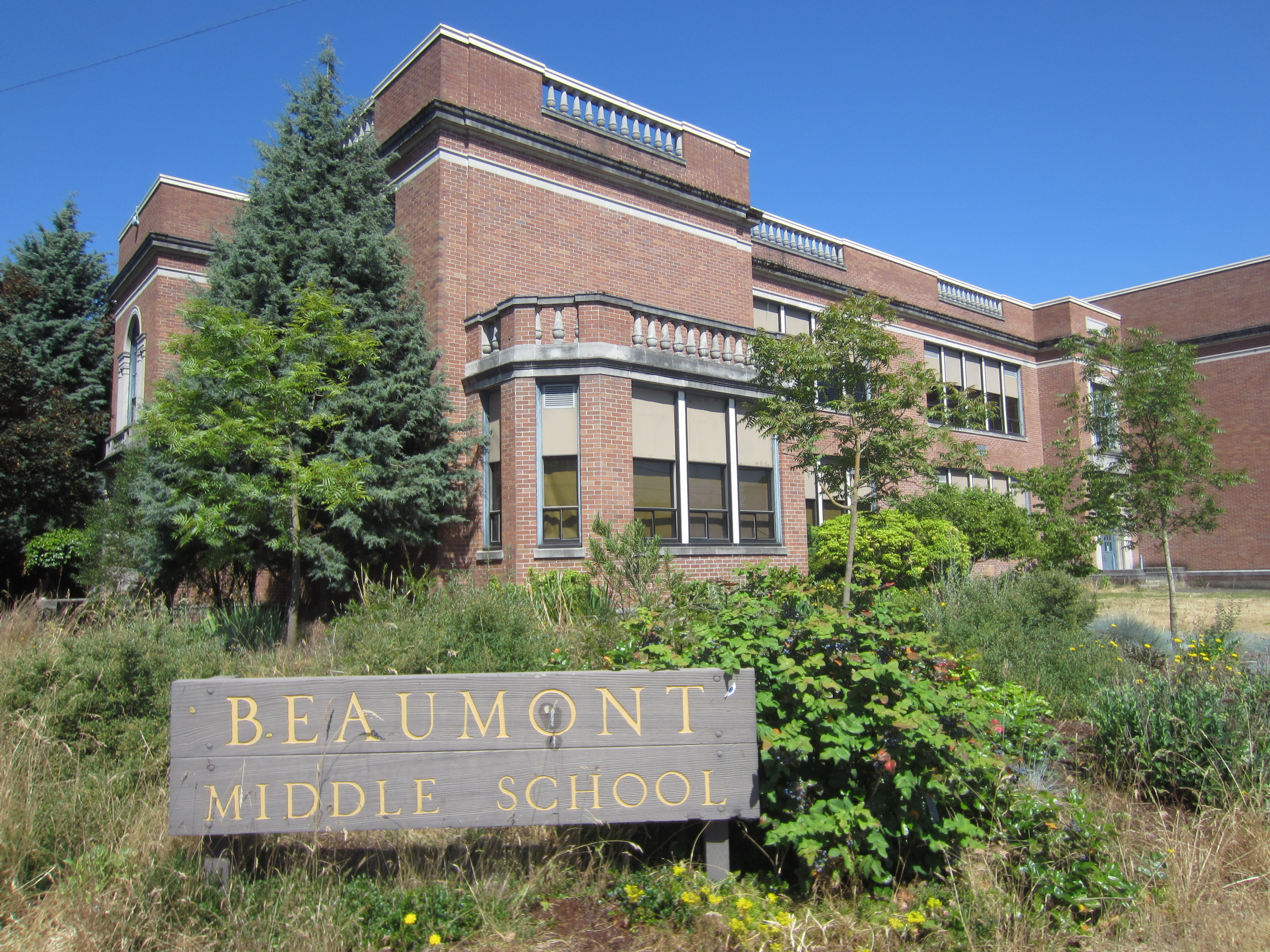
Beaumont Middle School, Portland
