= William J. Bain =

Canadian architect (1896–1985)

- Born: 27 March 1896; New Westminster, British Columbia, Canada
- Died: 22 January 1985 (aged 88)
- Education: University of Pennsylvania
- Occupation: Architect
- Practice: Naramore, Bain, Brady and Johanson,

William J. Bain (27 March 1896 – 22 January 1985) was a Canadian architect and a founder of the architecture firm Naramore, Bain, Brady and Johanson.

Bain was born in New Westminster, British Columbia. His family moved to Seattle while he was still young. Bain expressed an interest in architecture, and his father, a contractor, helped him get a job with Seattle architect Walter R. B. Willcox, from whom he learned the rudiments of drafting and developed beginning skills in architecture. Bain served in France during World War I, and after the war enrolled in the architecture program at the University of Pennsylvania, from which he graduated in 1921.

After several years in various apprentice positions, Bain opened his own architecture firm in 1924. He quickly developed a reputation for high-quality residential design. In 1928, he took Penn classmate Lionel Pries into partnership forming Bain & Pries. The firm prospered until 1931, then dissolved under the impact of the Depression. Bain's independent practice gradually recovered and by the late 1930s his firm was receiving a variety of commissions and the designs gradually became more modern. In 1940, Bain joined a joint venture with J. Lister Holmes, William Aitken, George W. Stoddard, and John T. Jacobson to design Yesler Terrace, Seattle's first public housing project. Each of the joint-venture partners continued to maintain their own independent practices as well. In 1941, Bain and Pries re-established their partnership for a period of about nine months.

During World War II Bain served as camouflage director for the state of Washington. He also joined other architects in joint-venture firms to design housing for war workers as well as other war-related projects. The joint venture formed in 1943, with Floyd Naramore, Clifton Brady, and Perry Johanson was particularly successful, and became the basis for the post-war firm Naramore, Bain, Brady and Johanson (occasionally called "the combine"), predecessor to today's NBBJ.

Bain remained interested in residential architecture and from 1947 to 1970 he was also a partner in Bain, Overturf and Turner (later Bain and Overturf), a firm that specialized in residential design.

Bain served as president of the Washington State Chapter American Institute of Architects (predecessor to today's AIA Seattle) from 1941 to 1943. Bain was elected a Fellow of the AIA in 1947.

His son, William J. Bain, Jr., is also a successful architect, NBBJ partner and Fellow in the AIA.
