= Clifton Brady =

American architect

Clifton Brady (16 October 1894 – 9 June 1963) was a Seattle architect and one of the founders of the American architectural firm NBBJ.

Brady was born in Walker, Iowa. He earned his B.Arch. in 1917 from Iowa State College (now Iowa State University), then served in the United States Army for two years. He moved to Seattle in 1927 and was employed by Floyd Naramore as an Associate from 1927 to 1933 and from 1938 to 1941; in 1941 they formed the partnership Naramore and Brady.

In 1943 Naramore and Brady joined with William J. Bain and Perry Johanson to form Naramore, Bain, Brady and Johanson (sometimes called "the Combine") to undertake war-related work such as defense plants, housing and hospitals. The partnership worked well and the four partners continued it after 1945—the successor firm is today known as NBBJ.

Brady served as President of the Washington State Chapter of the American Institute of Architects (predecessor to today's AIA Seattle Chapter) from 1947 to 1948. He died, aged 68, in Seattle.
