= Washington Council of the Blind Newsline =

Publication for the visually impaired in Washington state, US

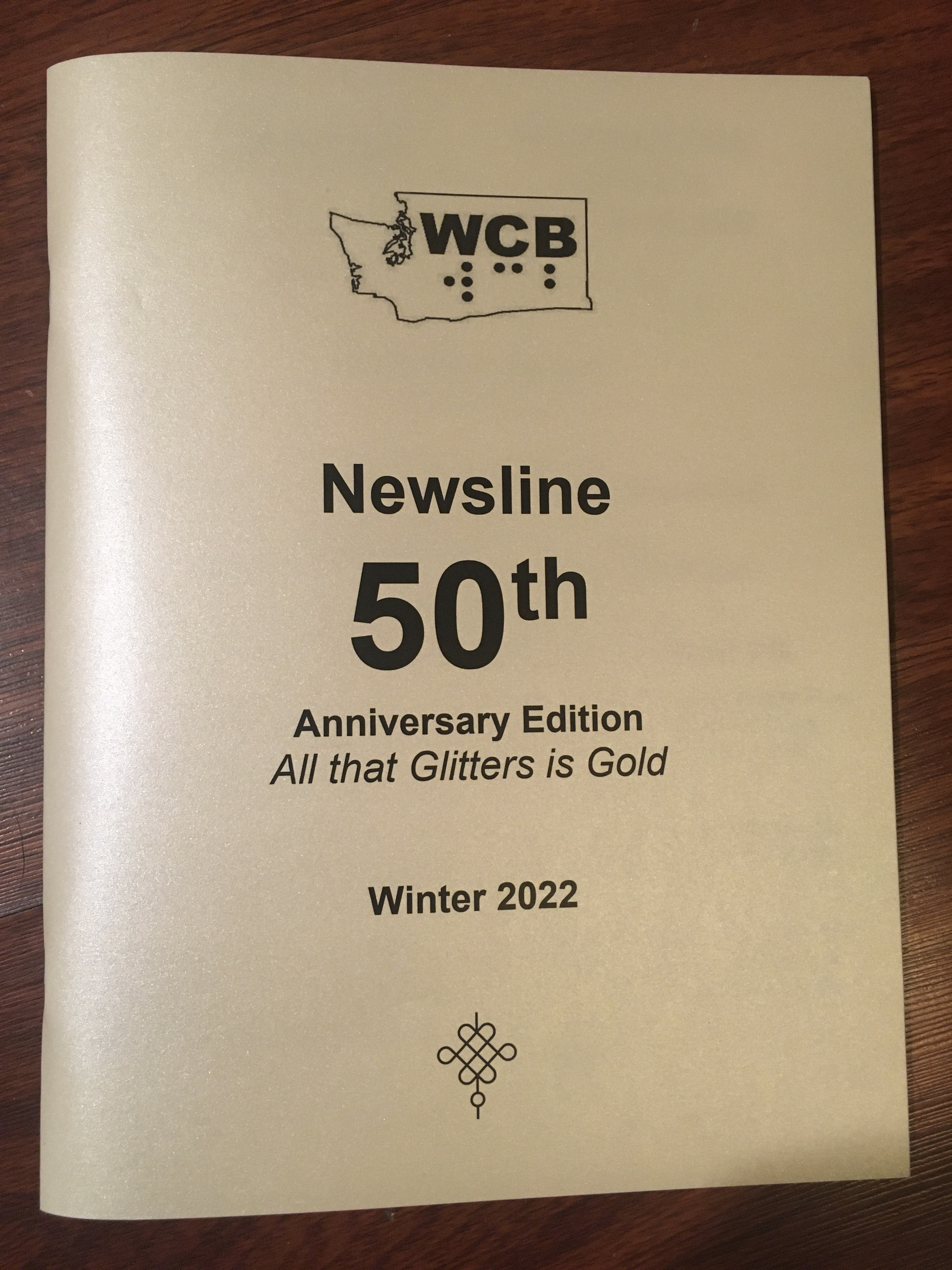
Washington Council of the Blind Newsline 50th Anniversary Edition

Washington Council of the Blind Newsline (WCB Newsline) is a quarterly magazine published by the Washington State affiliate of the American Council of the Blind. The magazine was founded by Carl Jarvis in 1972 as a publication of the Washington State Association of the Blind, and was initially produced as a large-print magazine. Jarvis launched WCB Newsline to fill a gap that had been left when the Washington State Association of the Blind's previous publication, White Cane Magazine, had ceased to be published. White Cane Magazine had been a monthly publication and had served as a crucial avenue for educating state legislators about issues of concern for visually impaired Washingtonians, and Jarvis hoped to preserve and expand upon that tradition with Newsline.

The earliest large-print editions of Newsline were produced using 18-point typewriter font stencils and an old hand-cranked copy machine. This method was used until 1981. Production was then relocated to a printing center at Eastern State College (now Eastern Washington University). Since the 1990s, WCB Newsline has been issued in audio form—first cassette tape and then digital audio cartridge—and has been issued in screen reader friendly and large-print digital text format since 2002. Topics covered by the magazine include human-interest stories, advocacy, legislation, local events, history, entrepreneurship, science, and technology. The magazine's archives serve as a continuous record of major advances in programs and services to the blind in Washington State. The WCB Newsline content editor is Heather Meares and its technical editor is Reginald George. Former editors include Carl Jarvis, who was editor for 10 years, and Peggy Shoel, who served for 15 years.

WCB Newsline won the Hollis K. Liggett Braille Free Press Award in 2011 and 2020 for promoting best journalistic practices and excellence in writing. A companion podcast, WCB Newsline Unleashed, was launched in October 2020.
