= Brain Rules =

Book by John Medina

Brain Rules: 12 Principles for Surviving and Thriving at Work, Home, and School is a book written by John Medina, a developmental molecular biologist. The book has tried to explain how the brain works in twelve perspectives: exercise, survival, wiring, attention, short-term memory, long-term memory, sleep, stress, multisensory perception, vision, gender and exploration. Each chapter demonstrates things scientists already know about the brain, and things we as people do that can affect how our brain will develop.

== Background ==
When the author has encountered certain articles and books with startling claims, such as, "Mozart Effect", on how brain functions and how we should teach or do business, he did not find any supporting evidence in brain science literature he was familiar with. He has concluded that all these misconceptions are there because brain scientists have not sufficiently talked to people at other domains, such as teachers, business professionals, education majors, etc. Therefore, he has decided to close this gap by writing this book. In this book, Medina cites only research that has appeared in peer-reviewed journals and that has been successfully replicated. The author has listed all the references he has used here.

== Content ==
The review article by Luciano Passuello has listed the following 12 principles from the book:

1. Exercise. Exercise boosts brain power.
2. Survival. The human brain evolved, too.
3. Wiring. Every brain is wired differently.
4. Attention. We don’t pay attention to boring things.
5. Short-term memory. Repeat to remember.
6. Long-term memory. Remember to repeat.
7. Sleep. Sleep well, think well.
8. Stress. Stressed brains don’t learn the same way.
9. Sensory integration. Stimulate more of the senses.
10. Vision. Vision trumps all other senses.
11. Gender. Male and female brains are different.
12. Exploration. We are powerful and natural explorers.

== Review ==
The book was in The New York Times Best Seller list on June 14, 2009, at number 14 under the Paperback Advice & Misc category.

== Releases ==
The book has been initially published from Pear Press in 2008 and has 301 pages. Scribe Publications Pty Ltd has published it as an ebook in 2011. It has been released as an audiobook by Pear Press in 2014.
