= Perry Johanson =

American architect

- Born: May 9, 1910; Greeley, Colorado, U.S.
- Died: June 15, 1981 (aged 71); Seattle, Washington, U.S.
- Education: architecture program at the University of Washington (B.Arch., 1934)
- Occupation: Architect
- Organizations: American Institute of Architects (Fellow, 1960)
- Known for: Co‑founder of NBBJ
- Notable work: Hilltop community, Bellevue
- Spouse: Jean Johanson (m. 1936)
- Children: 2

Perry Johanson (9 May 1910 in Greeley, Colorado – 15 June 1981 in Seattle) was a Seattle architect and one of the founders of the architectural firm NBBJ.

Johanson enrolled in the architecture program at the University of Washington in 1929 and graduated in 1934 with a B.Arch. While in school he was particularly influenced by Lionel Pries.

Johanson was initially employed by the Seattle firm Smith & Carroll, but within two years he was a partner in the firm, renamed Smith, Carroll & Johanson; the firm survived until 1951.

In 1943, during World War II, he joined with Floyd Naramore, William J. Bain, and Clifton Brady to form Naramore, Bain, Brady & Johanson (informally known as "The Combine" at the time) to undertake war-related projects such as reinforcing architecture. This joint venture worked so well that the partners continued it after 1945. Johanson remained a partner until his death. Today's NBBJ is the successor firm.

Johanson was one of the architects who joined together about 1950 to create the Hilltop community in Bellevue, Washington, a planned residential community of modern homes on large lots.

In 1950-51, Johanson served as the president of the Washington State AIA Chapter (predecessor to today's AIA Seattle Chapter). He was named a fellow of the AIA in 1960.

He married sculptor Jean Johanson in 1936. The couple had two children.
