= NBBJ =

American global architecture, planning and design firm

Practice information
- Founders: Floyd Naramore; William J. Bain; Clifton Brady; Perry Johanson
- Founded: 1943
- Location: Boston, Charlotte, Columbus, Hong Kong, London, Los Angeles, New York, Portland, Pune, San Diego, San Francisco, Seattle, Shanghai
- Coordinates: 47.620089°N 122.330758°W

Website
- nbbj.com

NBBJ is an American global architecture, planning and design firm with offices in Boston, Columbus, Charlotte, London, Los Angeles, New York, Portland, Pune, San Diego, San Francisco, Seattle and Shanghai.

The firm provides services in architecture, interiors, planning and urban design, environmental graphics, experience design, healthcare and workplace consulting, landscape architecture, and lighting design. The firm works across sectors including healthcare, commercial and workplace environments, science and research, education, civic and cultural institutions, and urban design.

NBBJ has been recognized as a TIME 100 Most Influential Companies (2025), and a six-time recipient of the Fast Company Most Innovative Architecture Firm award. NBBJ was also recognized as "Best in Business" by Modern Healthcare, named the fastest-growing architecture firm by Architectural Record, and designated by Wired as the "architecture firm of choice for tech companies."

== History ==
NBBJ was founded in 1943 by Seattle architects Floyd Naramore, William J. Bain, Clifton Brady, and Perry Johanson, originally under the name Naramore, Bain, Brady & Johanson. Formed during World War II to undertake large-scale federal projects such as the Bremerton Naval Shipyard expansion, the partnership remained intact after the war and evolved into one of the Pacific Northwest’s largest architecture firms.

In 1976, the firm merged with Columbus, Ohio-based Nitschke–Godwin–Bohm, formally becoming NBBJ and expanding its national reach.

In 2010, NBBJ merged with Cambridge-based urban design firm Chan Krieger Sieniewicz (CKS), enhancing its presence in the Northeast and adding to its urban design capabilities.

In 2020, NBBJ expanded its expertise in immersive and experiential design through its acquisition of ESI Design, a New York-based studio known for integrating interactive media and technology into the built environment.

== Sustainability and Climate Initiatives ==
The firm was an early signatory of the Architecture challenge, a global initiative to reduce fossil-fuel greenhouse gas emissions in the built environment. In 2025, NBBJ was ranked #1 among leading US architecture firms in Energy Use Intensity (EUI) reduction as part of the AIA 2030 °Challenge, reporting a portfolio-wide reduction of approximately 75%. The firm also ranked among the top two firms by gross square footage of projects meeting EUI targets.

NBBJ is also CarbonNeutral® certified by Natural Capital Partners and a signatory of the Amazon Climate Pledge.

== Research and Innovation ==
NBBJ has developed research initiatives focused on the relationship between the built environment and human performance, including studies on climate, temperature, and cognitive function in partnership with neuroscientist Dr. John Medina. In addition, the firm has developed partnerships with The New York Academy of Sciences to study what scientists want in their lab buildings, Professor Dr. Raj Choudhury of the London School of Economics (previously with the Harvard Business School) to design workplaces in an era of disruption and Professor Dr. Kevin Schulman of the Stanford’s Graduate School of Business to inform future hospital design in the age of artificial intelligence (AI).

== Selected completed projects ==
=== Workplace ===
- Alibaba Headquarters, China
- Alipay Headquarters, China
- Amazon Doppler, Day 1, and the third building, Seattle, Washington
- Amazon Spheres, Seattle, Washington
- Amazon's Arlington Headquarters, Arlington, Virginia
- Bill & Melinda Gates Foundation Headquarters, Seattle, Washington
- BlackRock, New York, New York
- Boeing Commercial Airplane Headquarters, Renton, Washington
- Brooks Sports, Seattle, Washington
- F5 Headquarters, Seattle, Washington
- Hana Bank Headquarters, Cheongna, Korea
- Reebok World Headquarters, Canton, Massachusetts
- Russell Investments Headquarters, Seattle, Washington
- Samsung North America Headquarters, San Jose, California
- Telenor World Headquarters, Fornebo, Oslo, Norway
- Tencent Headquarters, Shenzhen, China
- Two Union Square, Seattle, Washington
- Warner Bros. Discovery Second Century Project, Los Angeles, California

=== Commercial ===
- Keppel South Central, Singapore
- Moderna Headquarters, Cambridge, Massachusetts
- Oasis Central Sudirman, Jakarta, Indonesia
- Rainier Square Tower, Seattle, Washington
- The Works, Unity Campus, Cambridge, United Kingdom
- The Sail @ Marina Bay, Singapore
- Two Taikoo Place, Hong Kong

=== Healthcare ===
- Atrium Health Carolinas Medical Center New Bed Tower & Inpatient Expansion, Charlotte, North Carolina
- Atrium Health David L. Conlan Center at Carolinas Rehabilitation, Charlotte, North Carolina
- Banner Health Banner Estrella Medical Center, Phoenix, Arizona
- Brigham and Women's Hospital, Boston, Massachusetts
- Cleveland Clinic Heart Center Miller Pavilion, Cleveland Ohio
- Dubai Mall Medical Centre, Dubai, United Arab Emirates
- Elks Children's Eye Clinic at Oregon Health & Science University, Casey Eye Institute, Portland Oregon
- Jiahui Hospital, Shanghai, China
- Massachusetts General Hospital Lunder Building, Boston, Massachusetts
- Massachusetts General Hospital Phillip and Susan Ragon Building, Boston Massachusetts
- Meridian Center for Health, Seattle, Washington
- Miami Valley Hospital Heart and Orthopedic Center, Dayton, Ohio
- Nationwide Children's Hospital, Columbus, Ohio
- New York University Medical Center, New York, New York
- NYU Langone Health, Helen L. and Martin S. Kimmel Pavilion, New York, New York
- Ohana Center for Health, Monterey California
- Royal Liverpool Hospital
- Seattle Children's Hospital Bellevue Clinic and Surgery Center, Bellevue, Washington
- Seattle Children's Odessa Brown Children's Clinic, Seattle, Washington
- Southcentral Foundation Primary Care Clinic, Anchorage, Alaska
- Stad Center for Pediatric Pain, Palliative and Integrative Medicine, San Francisco, California
- UCSF Connie Frank Transplant Center Renovations, San Francisco, California
- UCLA Medical Center, Los Angeles, California
- University Medical Center New Orleans
- Veterans Affairs Hospital and Southeast Louisiana Veterans Health Care System Replacement Medical Center and Research Lab, New Orleans, Louisiana
- Yellowhawk Tribal Health Center, Pendleton, Oregon

=== Education ===
- American International University, Kuwait City, Kuwait
- City, University of London Main Entrance Transformation Project, London, United Kingdom
- Cleveland State University College of Education and Human Services, Cleveland, Ohio
- Cornell Tang Hall, Ithaca, New York
- Royce Institute, University of Manchester, United Kingdom
- Stanford University Li Ka Shing Center for Learning and Knowledge, Palo Alto, California
- UC San Diego Viterbi Family Vision Research Center, San Diego, California
- University of Cambridge Material Sciences and Metallurgy Building, Cambridge, United Kingdom
- University of Idaho, Integrated Research and Innovation Center, Moscow, Idaho
- University of Oxford, Life and Mind Building, Oxford, United Kingdom
- University of Southampton Life Sciences Building, Southampton, United Kingdom
- Webster Hall, Washington State University, Pullman, Washington
- Westmark, Encino, California

=== Experience Design ===
- Delta LGA Terminal C Media Experience, New York, New York
- Loma Land at Loma Linda University Children's Hospital, Loma Linda, California
- eBay Main Street, California
- Statue of Liberty Museum, New York, New York
- WarnerMedia Headquarters, New York, New York
- White House Public Tour, Washington D.C.

=== Science ===
- Abcam Headquarters, Cambridge, United Kingdom
- Brigham and Women's Hale Building for Transformative Medicine, Boston, Massachusetts
- California Institute for Telecommunications and Information Technology UCSD Atkinson Hall building, San Diego, California
- European Bioinformatics Institute, Cambridgeshire, United Kingdom
- Henry Royce Institute, University of Manchester, United Kingdom
- Moderna Headquarters, Cambridge, Massachusetts
- Nationwide Children's Hospital Research Institute, Columbus, Ohio
- Quadram Institute, Norwich, United Kingdom
- Seattle Children's Research Institute, Seattle, Washington
- University Enterprise Zone at Queen Mary University, London, United Kingdom
- University of Oxford, Life and Mind Building, Oxford, United Kingdom
- Wellcome Trust Sanger Institute, Cambridgeshire, United Kingdom

=== Cultural and Civic ===
- Columbus Metropolitan Library branches (Driving Park, Dublin, and Northside)
- Denny Substation, Seattle
- Federal Reserve Bank Building, Seattle, Washington
- Sacramento Courthouse, Sacramento, California
- Seattle Ferry Terminal
- Seattle Justice Center, Seattle, Washington
- Seattle Opera at the Center, Seattle, Washington
- Shasta County, New Redding Courthouse, Redding, California
- United States Courthouse, Bakersfield, California
- United States Courthouse, Billings, Montana
- United States Courthouse, Seattle, Washington
- White House Public Tour, Washington D.C.

=== Sports/Expo ===
- AsiaWorld-Expo, Lantau, Hong Kong
- Central Bank Center Renovation (Rupp Arena), Lexington, Kentucky
- Hangzhou Olympic Sports Expo Center, Hangzhou, China
- Jamsil Olympic Stadium Renovation, Korea
- Lincoln Financial Field, Philadelphia, Pennsylvania
- Paul Brown Stadium (now Paycor Stadium since 2022), Cincinnati, Ohio
- Staples Center, Los Angeles, California
- T-Mobile Park, Seattle, Washington
- UCLA Pauley Pavilion Renovation, Los Angeles, California

=== Urban Design ===
- Dallas Arts District
- Downtown Boston Planning Study, Boston, Massachusetts
- Georgia Tech Comprehensive Campus Plan
- Louisiana State University Comprehensive and Strategic Master Plan, Baton Rouge, Louisiana
- Pittsburgh Waterfront Master Plan
- Shanghai Bund Renovation, Shanghai, China (2011)
- Tencent Shenzhen Headquarters Project, Shenzhen, China
- The Southwestern Medical District Master Plan
- University of Utah Physical Development Plan
- Wilburton Urban Design and Sustainable District Opportunity Assessment
- Imperia Ocean City, Hung Yen, Vietnam

== Selected designers ==
Designers at NBBJ include: Steve McConnell (appointed managing partner in 2014), Jonathan Ward (partner), Joan Saba, Robert Mankin (appointed managing partner in 2023), Ryan Mullenix (partner), Jay Siebenmorgen (Design Partner), Mindy Levine-Archer (Design Partner) and Tim Johnson (partner).

== Recognition ==
- BusinessWeek/Architectural Record Good Design is Good Business Awards, Alley24/223 Yale, 2008
- American Institute of Architects (AIA) Institute Honor Awards, Interiors, R.C. Hedreen Company, 2009
- Interior Design Magazine, Best of Year Award, Dubai Mall Medical Centre, 2010
- Puget Sound Business Journal, Corporate Champion for the Environment, 2011
- Royal Institute of British Architects, RIBA Award Winner, Life Sciences Building at the University of Southampton, 2011
- American Institute of Architects Academy of Architecture for Health, Healthcare Award, Seattle Children's Bellevue Clinic and Surgery Center, 2011
- American Institute of Architects Academy of Architecture for Health, Healthcare Award, Massachusetts General Hospital Lunder Building, 2012
- IIDA, Healthcare Interiors Award, Bayt Abdullah Children's Hospice, 2012
- Interior Design Magazine, Best of Year Award, Bill & Melinda Gates Foundation Campus, 2013
- Healthcare Design Magazine, Firm of the Year Award, 2013
- AIA, National Interior Architecture Award, Two Union Square, 2022
- Fast Company's Innovation by Design Awards Honors Three NBBJ Projects, 2021
- Archinect, An Architect's Advice on Boosting Creativity in Hybrid Workplaces, 2022
- Modern Healthcare, Uplifting Behavioral Health Projects Fuel a New Model of Care, 2022
- Dezeen, A Net-Zero School for Neurodiverse Children in California, 2022
- Metropolis Magazine, St. Michael Medical Center Embraces its Northwest Setting, 2022
- New York Times, Say Goodbye to the Boring Conference Room, 2022
