= Floyd Naramore =

American architect

Architect of Portland Public Schools
- In office 1912–1919
- Preceded by: Position created
- Succeeded by: George Howell Jones

Personal details
- Born: Floyd Archibald Naramore; July 21, 1879 Warren, Illinois, U.S.
- Died: October 10, 1970 (aged 91)
- Education: University of Michigan; Massachusetts Institute of Technology

Floyd Archibald Naramore (July 21, 1879 – October 29, 1970) was an American architect. He is most notable for his work on schools, serving as architect and superintendent of properties for Portland Public Schools and as Architect of Seattle Public Schools. He was also a founder of the firm that is now known as NBBJ.

== Early life and education ==
He received a degree in engineering from the University of Michigan and a degree in architecture from the Massachusetts Institute of Technology in 1907.

== Career ==
He subsequently took a job as a drafter with the Chicago and North Western Transportation Company (C&NWRR) from 1900 to 1903, then worked with architect George Fuller on a C&NWRR office building for two years. He returned to school and earned an architectural degree at MIT in 1907. After a brief stint in Chicago, Naramore moved to Portland, Oregon, where he worked for Northwest Bridgeworks from 1909 to 1912 as a cost estimator.

Naramore's involvement with schools began thereafter and lasted until the 1930s. He was appointed Architect and Superintendent of properties for the Portland School District, a job he held from 1912 to 1919. He would design 16 schools in Portland, including Benson Polytechnic High School and Couch School. Many of the other schools in Portland built at the time were designed by George Jones. In 1919 Naramore was hired by the Seattle School District as the district's architect. Naramore became a prolific designer of schools contemporaneously with a new state compulsory attendance law and a decision to add junior high schools to the system which created tremendous demand for new buildings. He was responsible for the design of over thirty schools for the district. He also undertook school projects outside Seattle and consulted on school projects in other districts.

After 1931, Naramore practiced on his own designing institutional buildings; for example, he was a co-designer with Grainger & Thomas, and Bebb & Gould on Bagley Hall (1935–36) at the University of Washington. In 1939 Naramore took his long-time Associate Clifton Brady into partnership forming Naramore & Brady.

During the Second World War the firm participated in a variety of joint ventures to carry out design of defense projects. In 1943, Naramore & Brady joined with William J. Bain and Perry Johanson to form Naramore, Bain, Brady and Johanson (nicknamed "the Combine"). The success of this collaboration led the partners to continue it after 1945. Naramore remained senior partner until his death in 1970. Today the successor firm is known as NBBJ.

Naramore was named a Fellow of the American Institute of Architects (AIA) in 1935, and served as president of the Washington State Chapter of the AIA (predecessor of today's AIA Seattle chapter) from 1939 to 1940.

== Legacy ==
The Naramore Fountain in Seattle, Washington was donated by and named for Naramore.

== Gallery ==
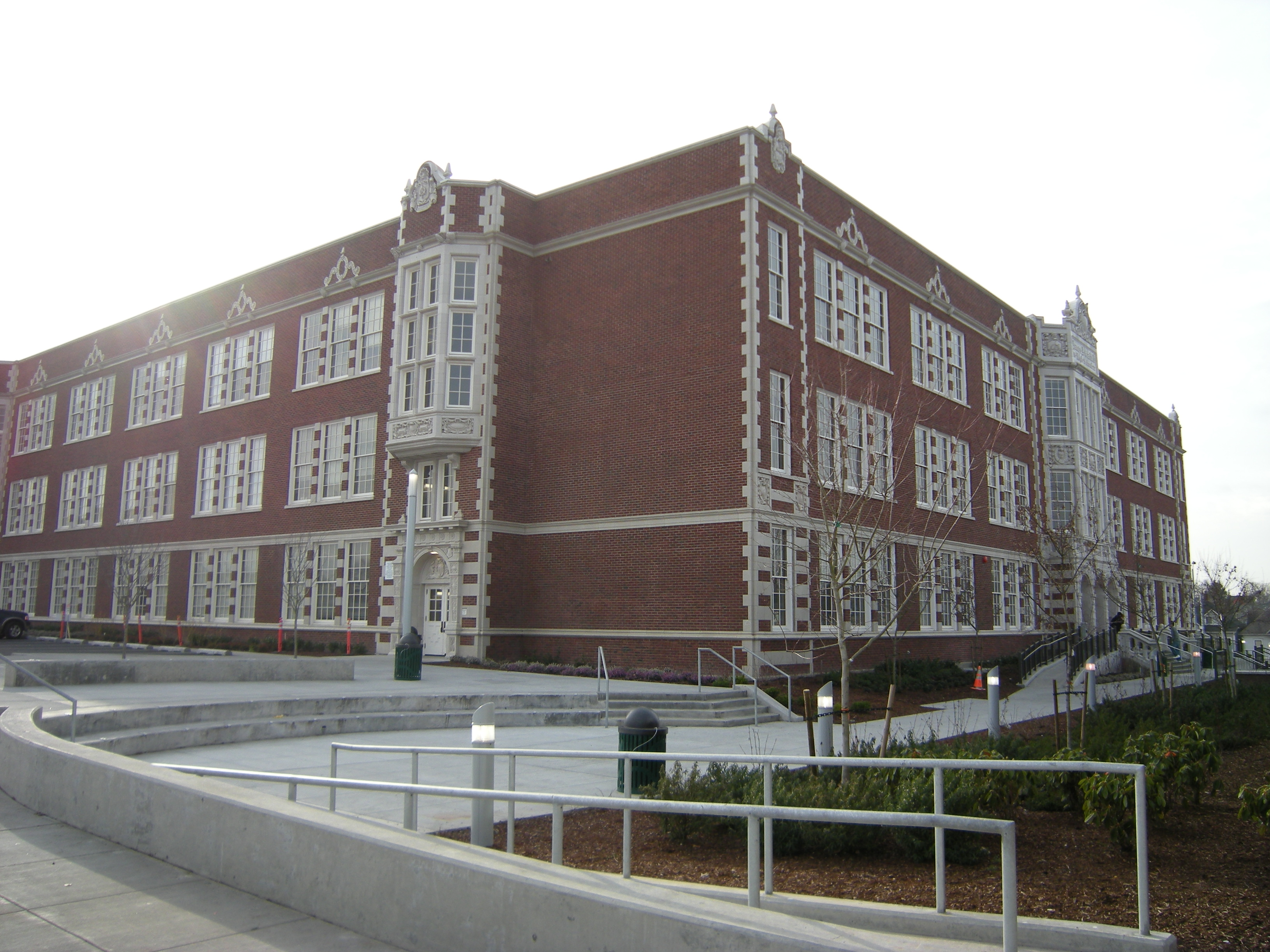
Garfield High School in Seattle, Washington

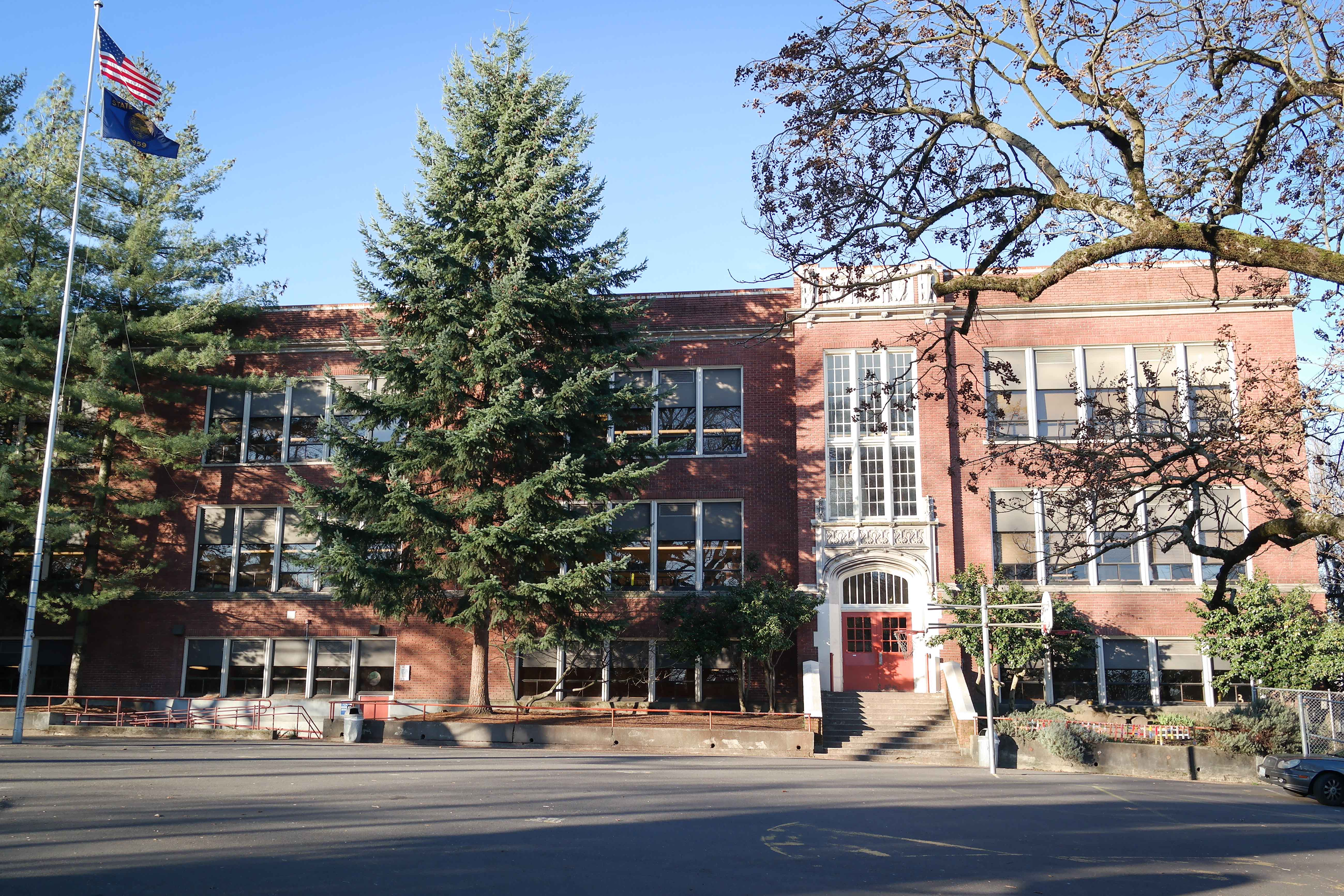
Metropolitan Learning Center (built as Couch School) in Portland, Oregon

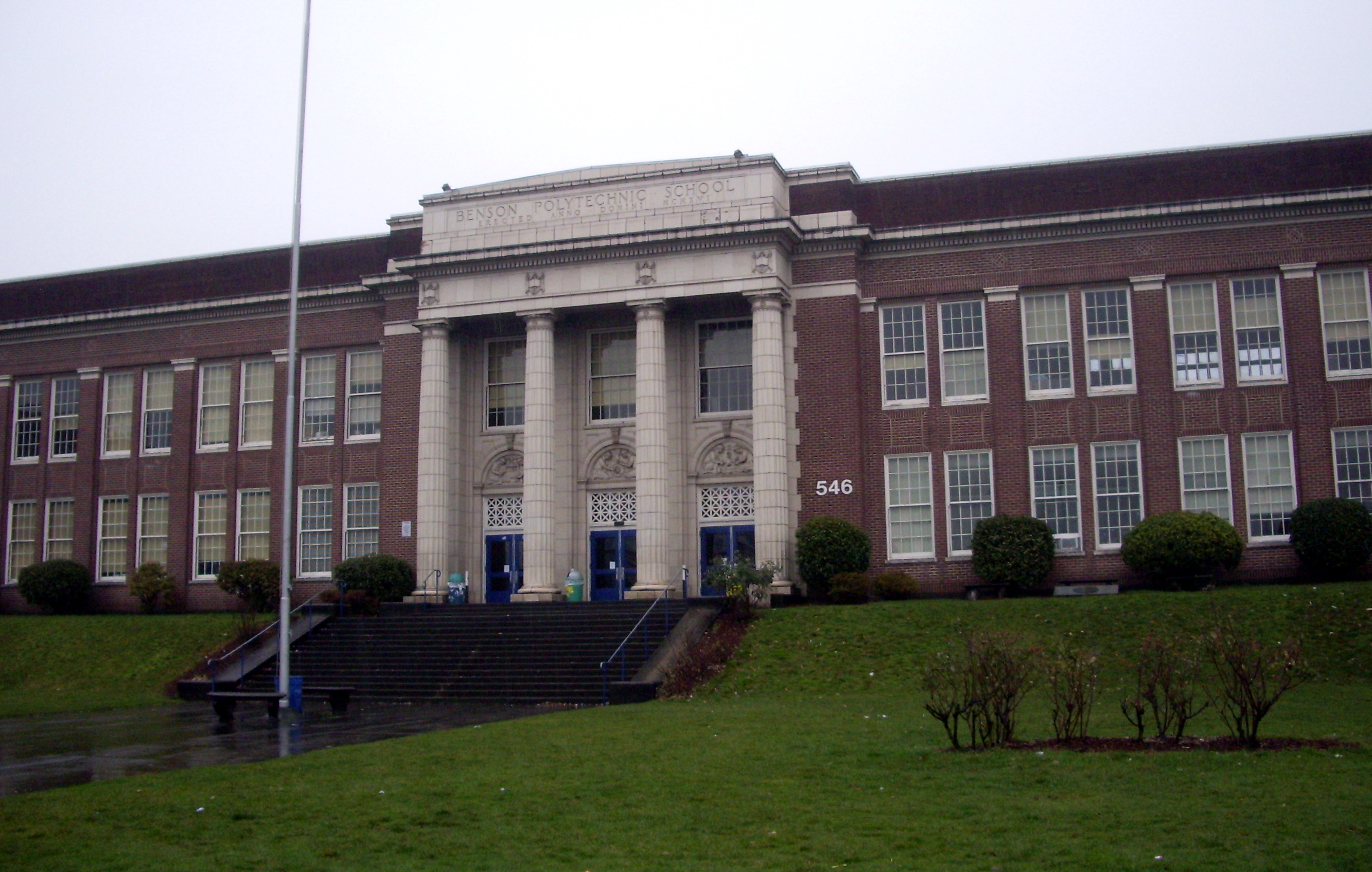
Benson Polytechnic High School in Portland, Oregon

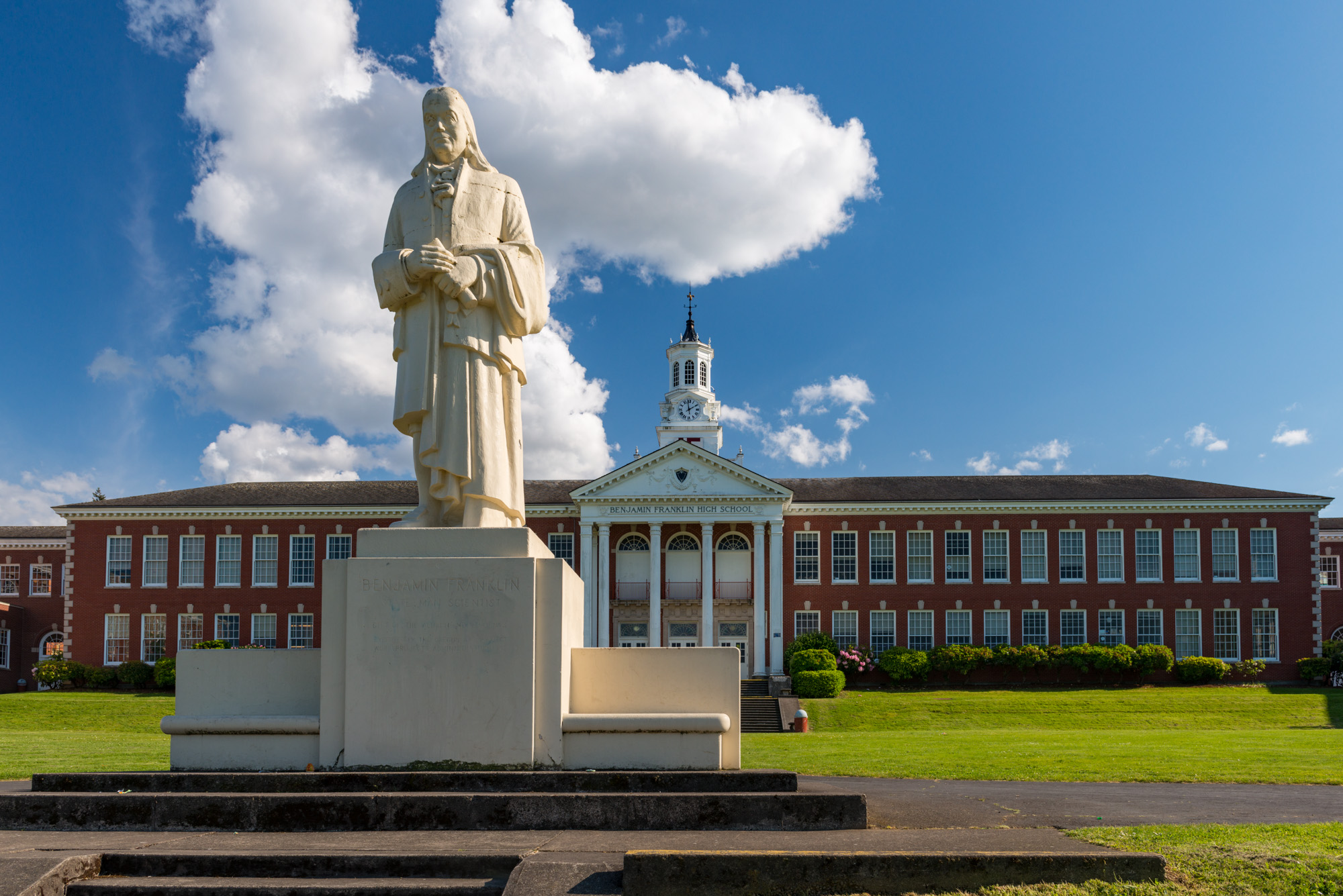
Franklin High School in Portland, Oregon

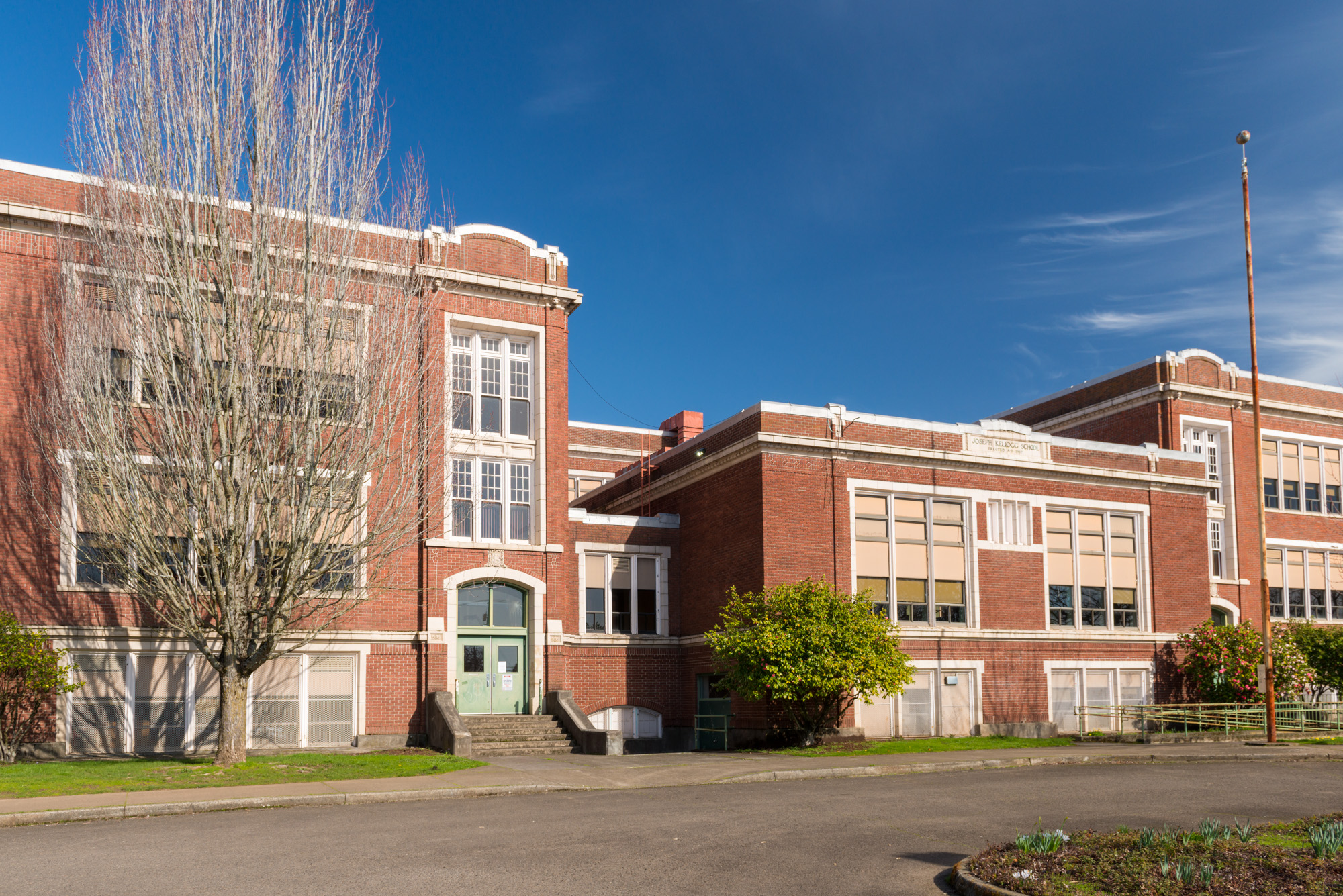
Kellogg Middle School in Portland, Oregon

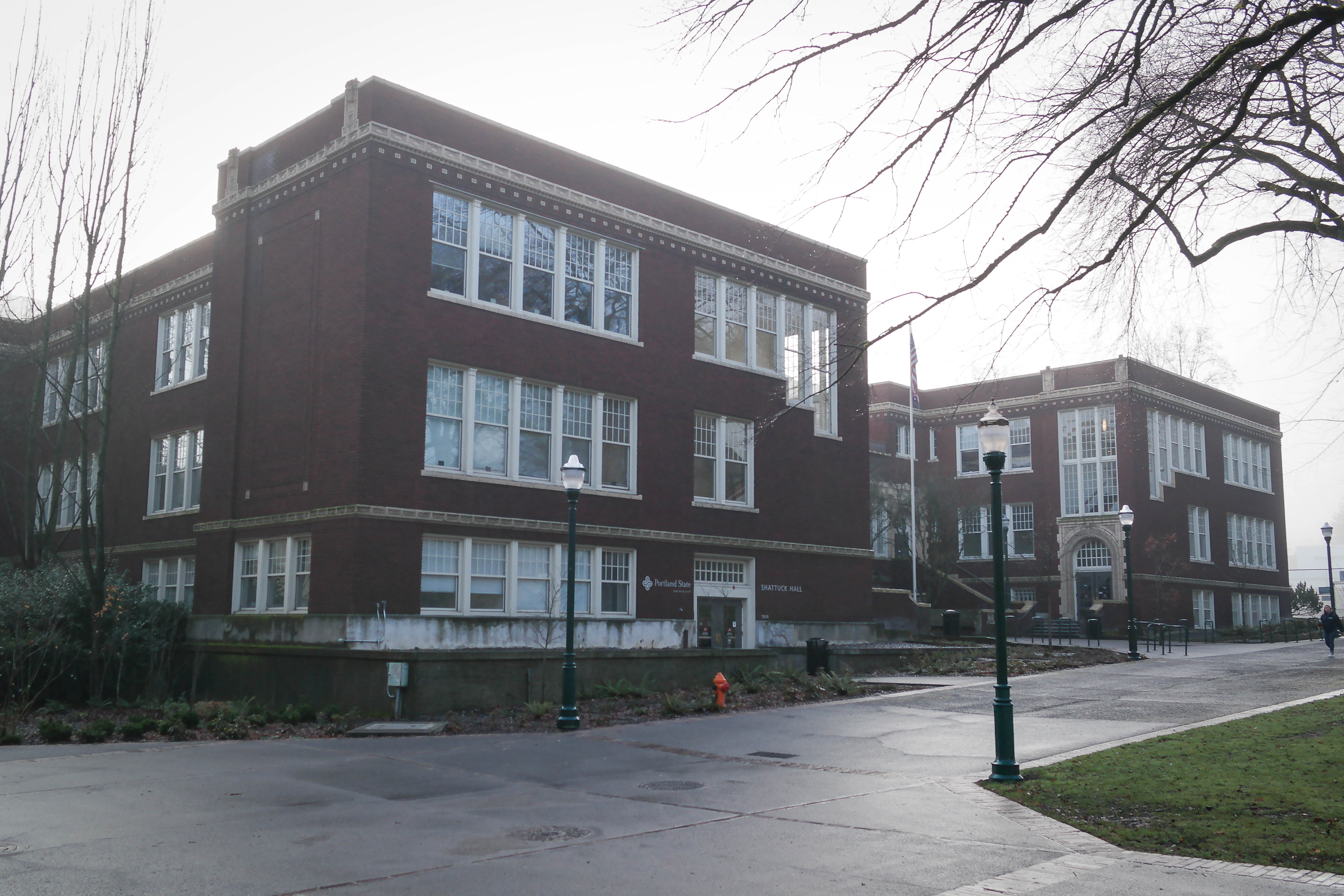
Shattuck Hall, Portland State University's School of Architecture. Built originally as Shattuck Elementary School

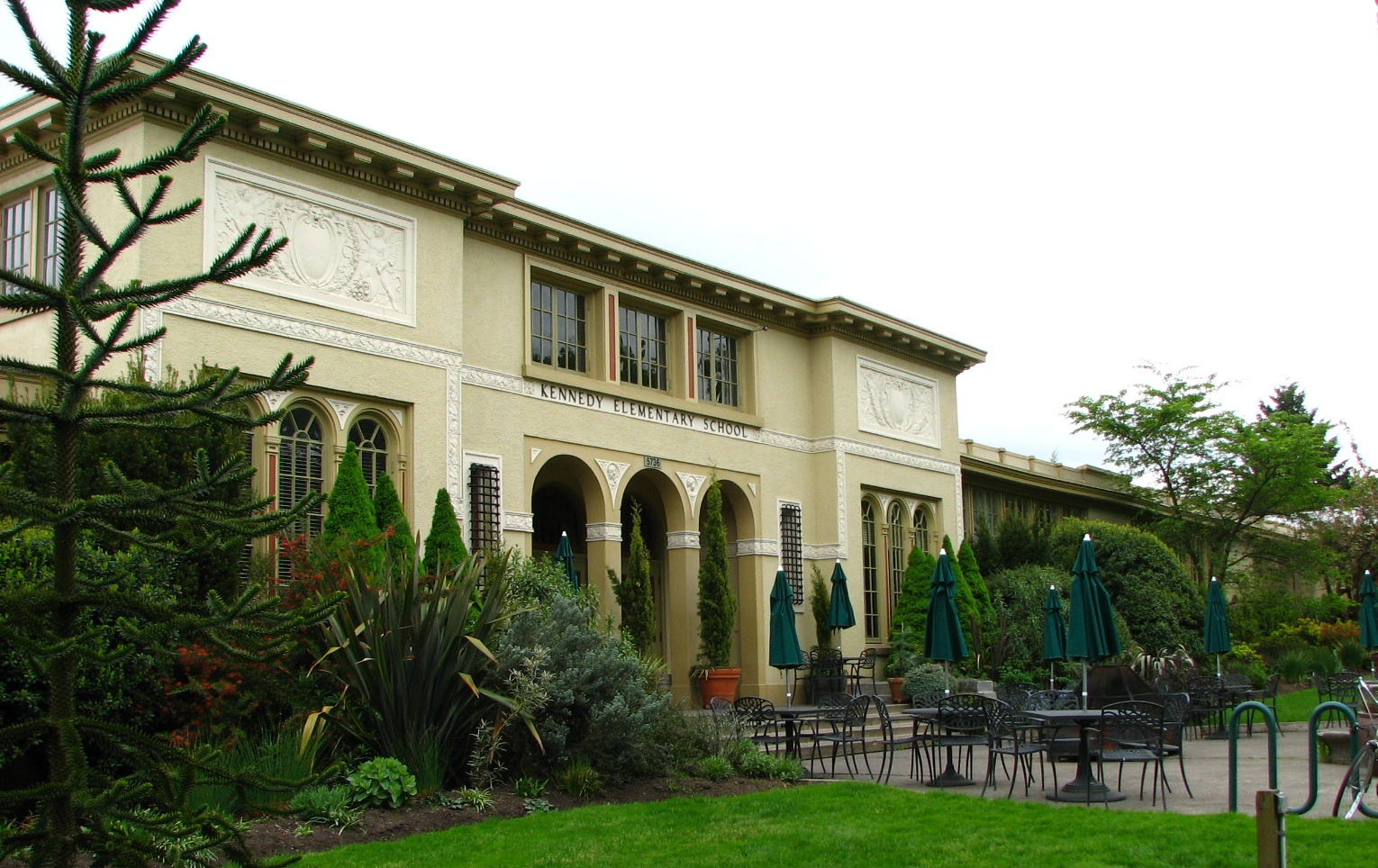
Kennedy Elementary School, now a hotel and restaurant owned and operated by McMenamins
