= John Medina (biologist) =

American molecular biologist

John J. Medina is a developmental molecular biologist with special research interests in the isolation and characterization of genes involved in human brain development and the genetics of psychiatric disorders. Medina has spent most of his professional life as an analytical research consultant, working primarily in the biotechnology and pharmaceutical industries on research issues related to mental health.

He was founding director of the Talaris Research Institute, which supports researchers such as Patricia Kuhl and John Gottman. He directed Talaris until 2006, and now is the director of the Brain Center for Applied Learning Research at Seattle Pacific University, which has worked on creating learning environments at Woodland Park Zoo. He is also an affiliate professor of bioengineering at the University of Washington School of Medicine.

Medina wrote the column "Molecules of the Mind" for Psychiatric Times.

== Education ==
Medina earned his Ph.D. in molecular biology from Washington State University and is a national faculty fellow of Continuing Medical Education, Inc., of Irvine, CA. In 2004, he was appointed to the rank of affiliate scholar at the National Academy of Engineering.

== Books ==
- Attack of the Teenage Brain! Understanding and Supporting the Weird and Wonderful Adolescent Learner. Seattle, WA: ASCD, March 12, 2018. ISBN 978-1-4166-2549-0
- Brain Rules for Aging Well: 10 Principles for Staying Vital, Happy, and Sharp. Seattle, WA: Pear Press, October 3, 2017. ISBN 978-0-9960326-7-4
- "Brain Rules for Baby: How to Raise a Smart and Happy Child from Zero to Five". Pear Press (October 12, 2010). ISBN 978-0-9797777-5-2
- Brain Rules: 12 Principles for Surviving and Thriving at Work, Home, and School. Seattle, WA: Pear Press, 2008. ISBN 978-0-9797777-0-7
- Medina, John (1991). The Outer Limits of Life. Oliver-Nelson Books. ISBN 978-0-8407-9114-6.
- Depression: How it happens, How it's healed ISBN 978-1-57224-100-8
- What You Need to Know About Alzheimer's. Oakland, CA: New Harbinger Publications, 1999. ISBN 978-1-57224-127-5
- The Clock of Ages: Why We Age, How We Age, Winding Back the Clock. Cambridge: Cambridge University Press, 1996. ISBN 978-0-521-46244-0
- The Genetic Inferno: Inside the Seven Deadly Sins ISBN 978-1-107-40549-3
- Uncovering the Mystery of AIDS
- Of Serotonin, Dopamine and Antipsychotic Medications OCLC 1036963127

== Lectures ==
- Your Best Brain, The Great Courses, ISBN 978-1-62997-103-2
