= Carolyn Geise =

American architect (born 1935)

- Born: Carolyn Lee Deuter; September 8, 1935 (age 90); Olympia, Washington
- Education: Whitman College; University of Washington
- Occupation: Architect
- Awards: American Institute of Architects Fellow; AIA Seattle Medal; Housing Hero Award
- Practice: Geise Architects
- Website: geise.net

Carolyn Lee Geise (born September 8, 1935) is an American architect, developer, and community organizer.

== Biography ==
Geise was born Carolyn Lee Deuter in Olympia, Washington on September 8, 1935; and grew up there and in Seattle. She attended Franklin High School in Seattle. She earned a BA in clothing and textiles from Whitman College in 1957, and then a B.Arch. from the University of Washington (UW) in 1963. She was the only woman to graduate with a degree in architecture, then primarily seen as a man's profession, but had been encouraged to explore it by architect Victor Steinbreuck. During her UW architecture studies, she staffed the American Institute of Architects (AIA) booth at the 1962 Seattle World's Fair, having won a scholarship from the national organization.

After graduating, she became the 21st woman registered as an architect in the state of Washington. She initially worked for Ralph Anderson, and then began work with Jane Hastings as one of Seattle's first women-owned design firms. She established Geise Architects, her own firm, in 1978. She received a gubernatorial appointment to the Washington State Architects Registration Board from 1984 to 1994. In 1989 Geise was the second woman from Washington (after Hastings) named as an American Institute of Architects Fellow, and only woman honored that year. In 2001 she received the AIA Seattle Medal, the highest recognition awarded by the Seattle organization. She is also a member of the AIA National Ethics Council. In 2005 she made a presentation of her life and career in the AIA Seattle LifeWorks Series.

Geise played an important role in the revitalization of Seattle's Belltown neighborhood. In 2005, the Seattle City Council proclaimed May as "Carolyn Geise Neighborhood Month" in recognition of her work, and named the plaza at the top of the Cistern Steps in Belltown "Carolyn Geise Plaza". She also acted as both developer and architect on the reclamation project of a 1914 factory building in the Denny Regrade neighborhood of Seattle. She worked on the popular Growing Vine Street Project, designed to transform the street into a pedestrian-focused linear park. She also created a retreat center and alpaca farm on Whidbey Island.

Geise has worked on a wide variety of projects intended to benefit groups such as homeless women and children. In 1998, she chaired the AIA Seattle Housing Action Task Force. In 2013, she received the Housing Hero Award from the Low Income Housing Institute for designing and advocating for low income housing and facilities for the community.

Geise was elected Commissioner in Island County in 2015.

== Personal life ==
In 1962 she married John Herbert Geise, another architectural student who she met at the Seattle World's Fair. They had a son together named Matt Geise. Following their divorce, she married Bill Jobe, a Boeing engineer.

By the age of 27, Geise had climbed Mount Rainier three times. She had also worked as a ski instructor with Jim Whittaker.

== Selected work ==
- Peter and Mell Schoening residence (1965), in partnership with L. Jane Hastings
- Howard and Ruth Pande residence (1974–75)
- Family Circle magazine's House That Women Built, Gig Harbor (1977)
- Seattle's Children's Home Activity Center (1984)
- Child Study and Treatment Center, Steilacoom (1985)
- Oening Company speculative house, Seattle (1985–86)
- HomeSight low-income housing project, Seattle (1987–99)
- King residence, Washington State (1989)
- 81 Vine Street Building rehabilitation/adaptive reuse, Seattle (1992–99)
- Growing Vine Street community project, Seattle (1994–2007), with others
- Davis/Schoening residence, Mercer Island (2000)
- Grand Street Townhouses, Seattle (2000–2002)
- Forrest Street Cluster Housing, Seattle (2003–5)
- Pickrell/Spec-tor residence, Seattle (2007)
- Renovation of Third Church of Christ, Scientist, Seattle (2008–13)
- Baxter residence, Vashon Island (2010–12)
