= Frank Chopp =

American activist and politician from Washington (1953–2025)

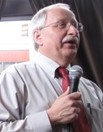

46th Speaker of the Washington House of Representatives
- In office January 11, 1999 – May 9, 2019 Serving with Clyde Ballard (1999–2002)
- Preceded by: Clyde Ballard
- Succeeded by: John Lovick (acting)

Minority Leader of the Washington House of Representatives
- In office July 2, 1998 – January 11, 1999
- Preceded by: Marlin Appelwick
- Succeeded by: Clyde Ballard

Member of the Washington House of Representatives from the 43rd district
- In office January 9, 1995 – January 13, 2025 Serving with Nicole Macri
- Preceded by: Pat Thibaudeau
- Succeeded by: Shaun Scott

Personal details
- Born: Frank Vana Chopp; May 13, 1953 Bremerton, Washington, U.S.
- Died: March 22, 2025 (aged 71) Seattle, Washington, U.S.
- Party: Democratic
- Spouse: Nancy Long (m. 1984)
- Children: 2
- Education: University of Washington (BA)
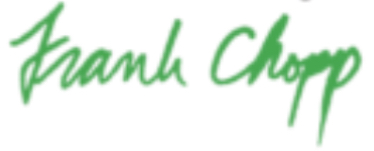
- Signature

Frank Vana Chopp (May 13, 1953 – March 22, 2025) was an American politician who was the 46th Speaker of the Washington House of Representatives from 1999 to 2019. A member of the Democratic Party, Chopp represented Washington's 43rd legislative district for three decades (1995–2025).

== Background ==
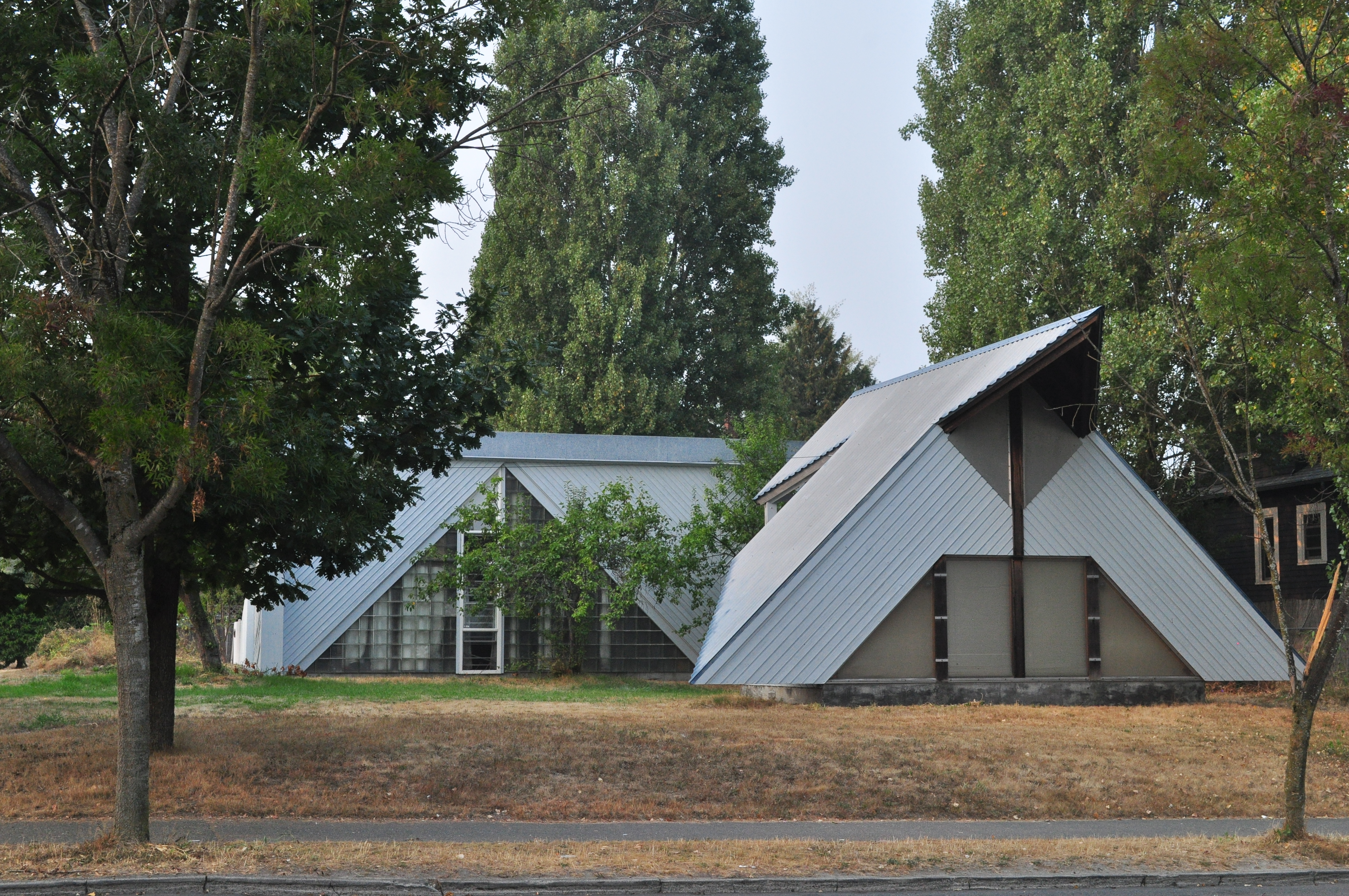
As a young man in the 1970s, Chopp and his father built these two modernist "urban cabins" in Seattle's Central District.

Frank Chopp was born on May 13, 1953, in Bremerton, Washington. His father was a coal miner who moved to the shipyards and found employment as a union electrical worker and his mother, Anne, worked in a school cafeteria. He attended East High School in Bremerton and graduated top of his class in 1971. While still in high school, Chopp led a protest against the Elks Club's refusal to allow black members. He later attended the University of Washington, graduating magna cum laude in 1975. As a student at the University of Washington, he organized efforts to preserve low-income housing in Seattle. To protest the demolition of low-incoming housing, Chopp lived in a geodesic dome situated in a parking lot in South Lake Union.

Chopp was married to Nancy Long and they had two children. He lived in the Wallingford neighborhood of Seattle, Washington. Chopp died on March 22, 2025, at the age of 71 from myocardial infarction.

== Early career ==
After graduating from the University of Washington, Chopp began his career as a community organizer focused on social services and education. From 1976 to 1983, Chopp held various managing and directorial positions for the Cascade Community Center, the Pike Market Senior Center, and the North Community Service Center before becoming executive director of the Fremont Public Association, now known as Solid Ground, in 1983. As executive director of the FPA, Chopp promoted services such as an emergency food bank, a clothing bank, and an employment program. Chopp later served as the organization's president, and served as senior advisor since 2006.

Chopp was involved with a number of groups, service agencies, and programs including the Coalition for Survival Services, King County Housing Opportunity Fund, Cascade Shelter Project, the Food Resources Network, the Workers Center, Lettuce Link, Community Voice Mail, the Sand Point Community Housing Association, PortJOBS, the Committee for Economic Opportunity, and the Low Income Housing Institute. Chopp co-founded the Seattle Tenant's Union in 1977 and was involved in efforts to organize three collective bargaining units for office workers, home care workers, and public transit drivers.

From 1992 to 1995, he held a part-time lecturer position at the University of Washington Graduate School of Public Affairs. Since 1972, Chopp served on over twenty nonprofit boards.

== Politics ==
Chopp was first elected to the House in 1994. He served as House Minority Leader from 1997 to 1998. In 1999–2001, Democrats and Republicans split the House and Chopp served as Co-Speaker in the 1999–2001 legislative sessions alongside Clyde Ballard. Chopp served as Speaker of the House from 2002 to 2019.

=== Issues ===
In 2003, Chopp voted for an operating budget Democrats later condemned as the "Rossi budget" when its architect, Republican Senator Dino Rossi, ran for governor in 2004; most of Chopp's House Democrats voted against the budget.

In 2006, Chopp killed a bill requiring large employers like Wal-Mart to reimburse the state if they heavily relied upon state programs for employee health care.

Many fans of the former Seattle SuperSonics National Basketball Association franchise felt Chopp was a roadblock to keeping the team. Seattle Post-Intelligencer columnist Art Thiel stated "Sonics fans have come to know Chopp, D-Death Star, as the No. 1 legislative opponent of public help to keep the team in Seattle." New owners bought out the Seattle lease and moved the team to Oklahoma City before the 2008–09 season, where the team now plays as the Thunder.

In 2008, the Democratic Senate passed a bill, 27–20, giving Washington consumers statutory warranty rights in purchasing new homes. The bill passed the House Judiciary Committee before being denied a House floor vote by Chopp. The same thing had happened in 2007. Chopp's action was condemned editorially by both the Seattle Times and the Post-Intelligencer (then a print newspaper). In awarding Chopp a "Schrammie," Ken Schramm of KOMO News stated: "For the second year in a row, the Great and Mighty Speaker has had his way in killing a bill that would've provided homeowners with protection against shoddy construction." The Post-Intelligencer asked,"Why is Democratic House Speaker Frank Chopp yet again killing a bill that would protect this state's homeowners from being on the hook for shoddy construction? It doesn't look good that Chopp has friends at the Building Industry Association of Washington, the bill's main opponent (BIAW executive VP Tom McCabe said he'd love to see Chopp run for governor)."

In 2009, Chopp killed a Worker Privacy Bill that Democrats had promised to support during their 2008 campaigns. After a labor lobbyist warned some friends that organized labor might withhold support from Democrats, Chopp tried to have the lobbyist arrested by the Washington State Patrol; however, the Patrol exonerated the lobbyist.

By the 2017, legislative session, a faltering Chopp again faced the prospect of losing a state budget battle to Senate Republicans, as he had every session since 2003 in which Republicans were in control. On the eve of the June 30 vote to avert a state shutdown Chopp refused to make his budget compromise public.

==== Housing ====
Prior to being elected, Chopp helped lead the campaign to approve a $50 million Low-Income Housing Levy and a $25 million Seattle Art Museum Levy. Chopp also initiated and organized efforts to create the Low Income Housing Institute; the Seattle Tenants Union; the King County Housing Opportunity Fund, which was the first King County allocated its own local tax dollars to provide low-income housing; the Sand Point Community Housing Project; the Broadway Emergency Shelter and the Family Shelter Program; the Cascade Shelter Project; and expanded the Housing Counseling Program, which assists low-income people who face eviction or foreclosure.

Chopp helped co-found Washington's Housing Trust Fund, which has provided over $1 billion for low-income housing since its inception and also created the Housing Security Fund, which helps pay for housing and support services for the homeless.

Chopp designed the Home and Hope program, which repurposes unused public properties for affordable housing development. The program has built nearly 300 affordable apartment buildings in Seattle.

In 2015, Chopp took credit for legislation requiring Sound Transit to donate excess land around new light rail stations to non-profit affordable housing developers.

==== Healthcare ====
Chopp co-organized the successful application, working with the Seattle-King County Health Department, for a Health Care for the Homeless Project from the Robert Wood Johnson Foundation, as well as initiating a home care program. Chopp also initiated health programs for the elderly, people with disabilities, and those infected with AIDS.

In the 2007 legislative session, Chopp helped create Apple Health For Kids, which now covers over 800,000 young people in Washington State. Chopp also implemented Medicaid Expansion in Washington State. He led efforts to help enact mental health parity, which Chopp cited as "the proudest moment of my service in the Legislature." Chopp also helped save and reform the Disability Lifeline program, which provides services for people with disabilities.

In 2019, Chopp passed "Cascade Care," a public option for health insurance available to all Washington residents. When the program takes effect in 2021, it will be offered under a hybrid public-private model that lawmakers selected to control healthcare costs while reducing premiums and co-pays for patients.

==== Economy ====
Chopp was an early proponent of the Community Jobs program, which helps welfare recipients gain skills and employment through various community-based nonprofit organizations in Washington State. Chopp served as a founding board member of the Office of PortJOBS at the Port of Seattle. In this role, he initiated the Committee for Economic Opportunity, which developed partnerships with the Port of Seattle, businesses, labor unions, and educational institutions. Chopp also co-initiated and developed the Seattle Worker Center, which addresses the needs of dislocated and unemployed workers, through a Re-employment Support Center, the Trades Mentor Network, and Community Voice Mail (which won a national award for Innovations in State and Local Governments) sponsored by Harvard University and the Ford Foundation.

Chopp was one of the founding members of the successful minimum wage increase initiative in SeaTac in 2013. He also led a coalition to increase Washington State's minimum wage to the highest level in the nation, which was the first time annual increases were tied to the cost of living. Chopp also passed legislation requiring paid sick leave, expanding collective bargaining rights, and banning wage theft.

==== Education ====
In 2005, Chopp created the Education Legacy Trust Fund, which supports "expanding access to higher education through funding for new enrollments and financial aid, and other educational improvement efforts." Chopp led efforts to expand the Opportunity Grant program and Opportunity Scholarship Fund to make college more affordable for students. In the 2015–17 budget, Chopp supported a tuition freeze, as well as lowering tuition costs. In 2014, Chopp helped enact the DREAM Act, which provided access to college for students from immigrant families.

In 2015, Chopp led efforts to invest over $1.3 billion in basic K-3 education as part of the first phase of addressing the McCleary decision.

In 2019, Chopp led the passage of free college and university tuition through the Workforce Education Investment Act. The legislation expands the Washington College Grant and provides free tuition at public colleges and universities to 120,000 low-income students per year. The grant is funded by a progressive payroll tax on companies with highly skilled workers, including major tech corporations such as Microsoft and Amazon.

==== Environment ====
Chopp was a proponent of taking action to address climate change. He led efforts to reduce and ban toxic chemicals, cleaning up Washington's waterways, promoting renewable energy production, clean car standards and reducing greenhouse gas emissions, and other important environmental issues.

In 2019, Chopp passed the 100% Clean Electricity Mandate and the Clean Fuel Standard, although the latter did not pass the State Senate. The Clean Electricity Mandate requires that the state decarbonize its electricity sector by 2030. The measure also includes "energy assistance" funds, paid for by utilities, that are available to low-income households for home weatherization, solar panel installation, and efficiency upgrades.

==== Women's issues ====
Chopp was a pro-choice proponent. As Speaker, he supported the Reproductive Parity Act, which guaranteed health coverage for a woman's right to seek an abortion. Chopp supported efforts for pay equity for women and initiatives that get more women in the workplace.

In 2018, Chopp supported the Reproductive Parity Act to ban discrimination in reproductive care. The law requires health insurers to cover abortions if they cover maternal care. The bill was supported by pro-choice organizations, including Planned Parenthood Votes Northwest and Hawai'i.

==== LGBT issues ====
In 2012, Chopp supported the Marriage Equality Act, as well as helping Washington state to be the first state to repeal the Defense of Marriage Act. Chopp also supported gay rights legislation in the Washington State House in 2005 that ultimately failed in the Republican controlled State Senate by one vote.

In 2020, Chopp supported the "comprehensive sex-ed bill", which requires public schools to teach consent, contraception, and LGBTQ issues.

==== Transportation ====
During Chopp's tenure at the Fremont Public Association, he co-initiated and oversaw the operation of Seattle Personal Transit, which provides transportation for low-income elderly and people with disabilities. Chopp also organized opposition to the original plan for the West Seattle Freeway in 1974, collecting over 20,000 signatures within a month to refer the issue to the voters.

As Speaker, Chopp supported legislation for the 2015 Connecting Washington funding package. The measure authorized the Sound Transit 3 vote, which voters passed in 2016. Chopp sponsored legislation to require Sound Transit to donate excess property around new light rail stations to non-profit affordable housing developers.

Political offices
Preceded by Clyde Ballard	Speaker of the Washington House of Representatives; 1999–2019	Succeeded by John Lovick; Acting
