= National Building =

- U.S. National Register of Historic Places
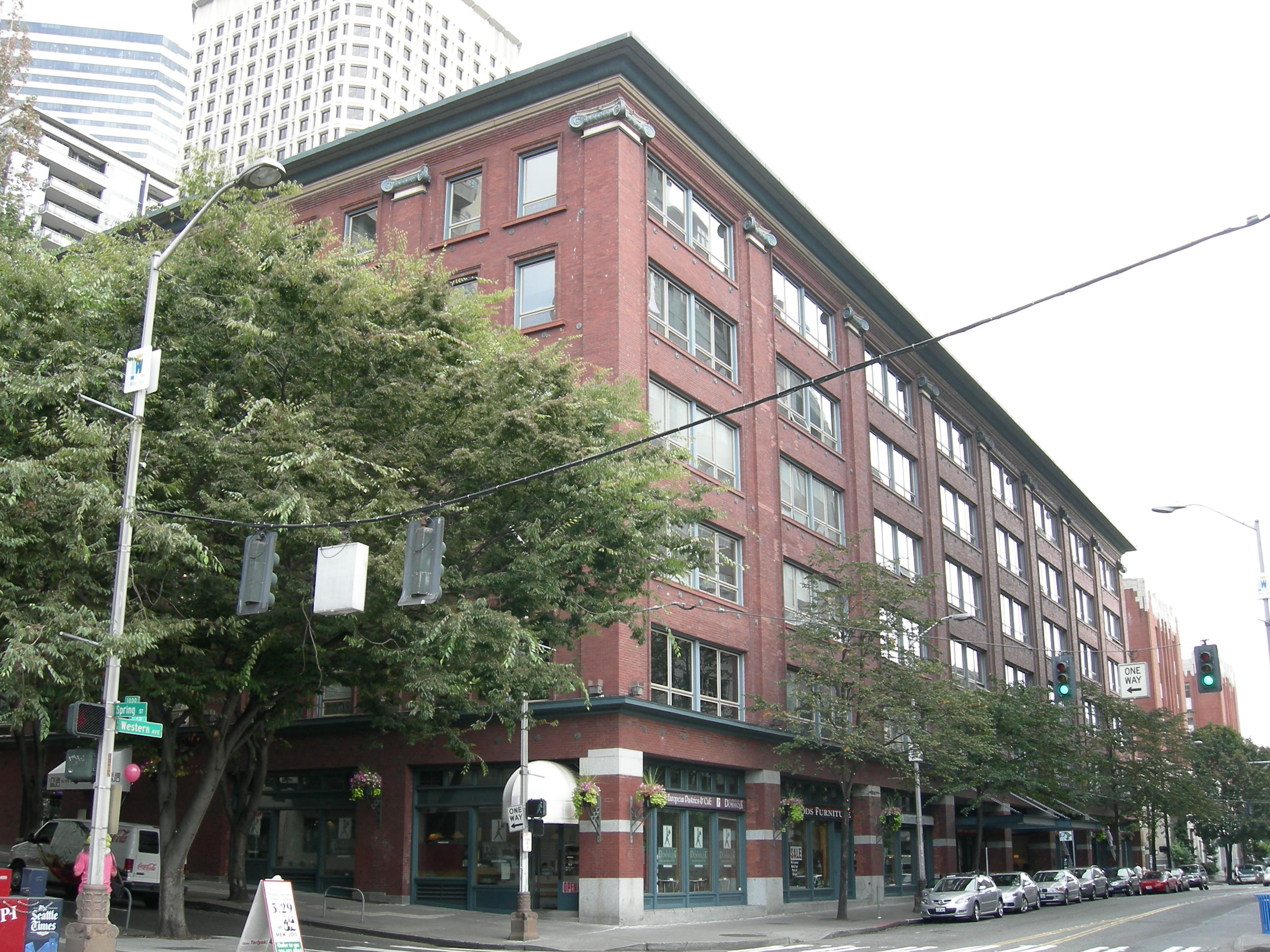

- Location within Downtown Seattle
- Location: 1006-1024 Western Ave., Seattle, Washington
- Coordinates: 47°36′17.08″N 122°20′14.67″W
- Built: 1905
- Architect: Kingsley & Anderson; Robert C. Reamer (interior alterations only)
- NRHP reference No.: 82004244
- Added to NRHP: April 29, 1982

The National Building is a historic warehouse building in downtown Seattle, Washington, located on the east side of Western Avenue between Spring and Madison Streets in what was historically Seattle's commission district. It is now home to the Seattle Weekly. It is a six-story plus basement brick building that covers the entire half-block. The dark red brick facade is simply decorated with piers capped with small Ionic capitals and a small cornice, which is a reproduction of the original cornice. Kingsley & Anderson of Seattle were the architects.

The National Building was constructed from late 1904 to mid 1905 by the Northern Pacific Railway as part of the road's multimillion-dollar plan to improve their many Seattle properties and capitalize on the city's booming commission trade. One of the building's first tenants was the National Grocery Company which at first only occupied two of the building's eight stories and would later occupy the entire building, becoming its namesake. It would occupy the building until 1930. The building was later home to many small manufacturing and distributing firms and has been an office building since the late 1960s.

The National Building individually was listed on the National Register of Historic Places on April 29, 1982 and became a city of Seattle landmark collectively with the Globe Building, Beebe Building and Hotel Cecil one year later as "First Avenue Groups/Waterfront Center".

== Appearance ==
This architectural description of the National building was written for its National Register nomination in 1982: "The Western Avenue facade consists of eight bays encompassing storefronts at the ground story, and horizontal window bands in the upper five stories. The bays are defined by nine piers which are expressed externally as pilasters, and terminated at the sixth story by large ionic capitals. Wall planes within each bay are recessed behind the nine pilasters and enriched with molded back surrounds at the sides and top. Fenestration is characterized by a regular system of horizontal window groupings, each consisting of four pivoting windows with transoms. The window bands are separated vertically by wide, unadorned brick spandrels. Two of the bays include fire escapes.

The two side elevations incorporate four bays each, and are also defined by pilasters with ionic capitals. Fenestration Includes pairs of square-shaped window openings within each bay at each of the upper five stories. Openings at the ground level of both elevators include storefront windows, small windows and doorways.

The east, or Post Avenue, elevation is relatively undistinguished and includes a simple series of horizontal window bands in the upper stories, and a loading dock with large freight doors at the ground floor.

Several original elements, including a wide cornice and all but two projecting marquees, are presently missing from the building (these were restored during the building's renovations in 1982)."

== History ==
=== National Grocery Company ===
The National Grocery Company was formed in late 1902 by Portland, Oregon wholesale grocer Julius C. Lang in order to acquire and merge two Seattle wholesale grocery firms: Sylvester Brothers & Co. and Louch-Augustine Co's wholesale arm. The new company moved into the Sylvester Brothers' former location at Occidental and Main Streets in the Union Trust Building. By 1904 they were one of the leading wholesale grocery companies in the Pacific Northwest with 15 traveling salesman on the payroll and their trade extending to Alaska and British Columbia.

=== Building site ===
In the 1890s, The Northern Pacific Railway had acquired large strips of narrow land between Seattle's downtown and the railroad tracks, mostly reclaimed tideland. Their goal was to locate the railroad's terminus here but strong local opposition made them reconsider, eventually leading to the construction of a tunnel and King Street Station. With their original plans scrapped, Northern Pacific rented the property to wholesalers and produce distributors which quickly became a success. Northern Pacific decided to capitalize on this and planned to replace the ramshackle tin buildings with permanent brick warehouses that could be rented to large wholesale firms.

In 1904, Northern Pacific subsidiary the Northwest Improvement Company hired the Seattle architectural firm of William Kingsley and Joseph Anderson to design two four story brick warehouses that would face each other on Western Avenue between Spring and Madison Streets in the heart of the city's produce district. Each building, costing about $200,000, would have ample lighting, ten freight elevators, and facilities for moving and storing heavy goods. In the end, only the National Building was built at height. One of the first companies to sign up for the building, which had not yet been built, was the National Grocery Company who had outgrown their small space in Pioneer Square. They leased the southern 40% of the building. As more tenants lined up to lease space in the buildings, Northern Pacific responded by adding two more floors to each building's plans. Both buildings were completed by early 1905 and, realizing the potential, Northern Pacific would build many more warehouses on Western Avenue over the following years.

=== Later years and restoration ===
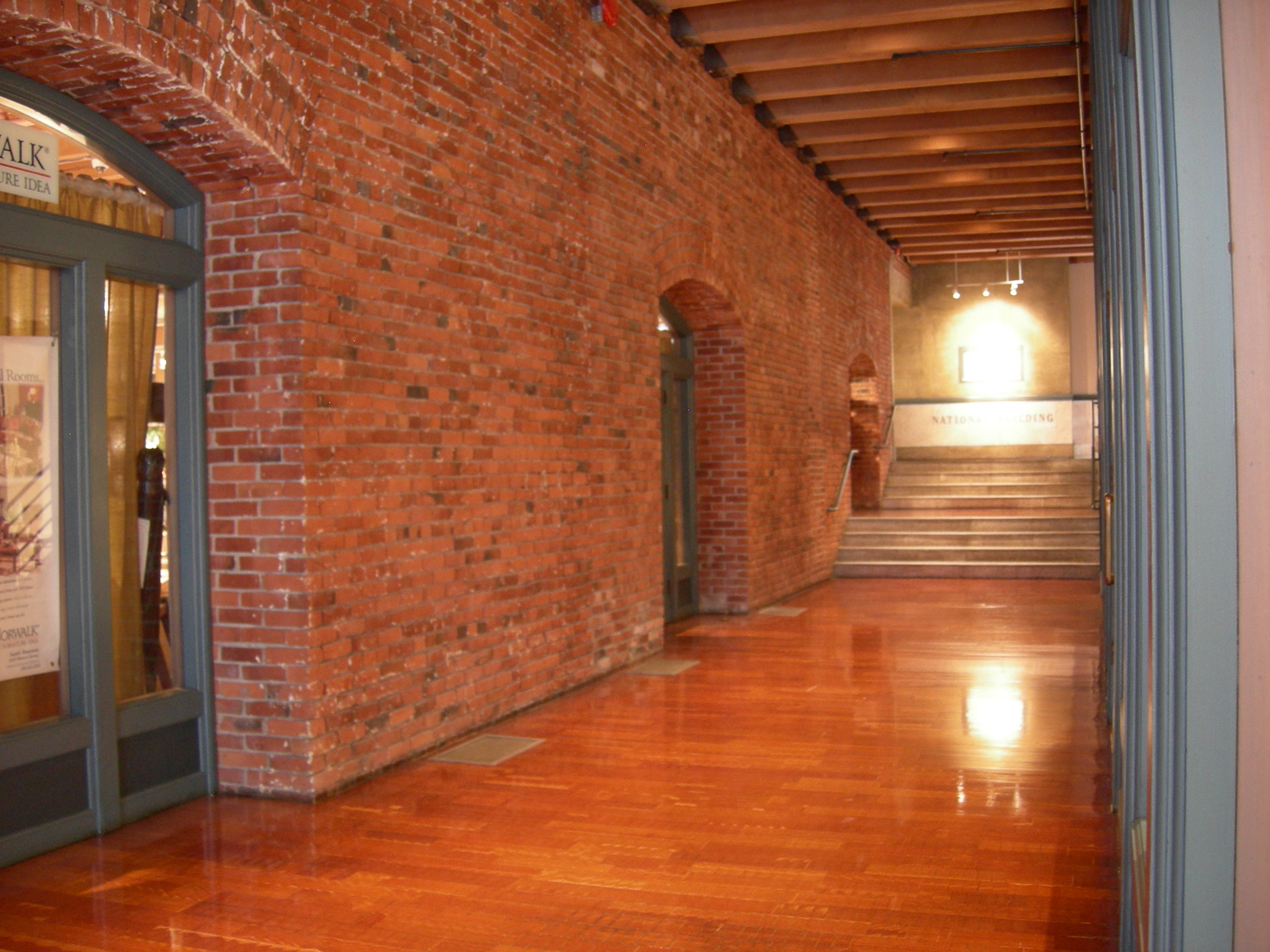
Interior view of the National Building showing exposed brick arches

The National Grocery Company moved out of the National building in 1930 but the name of the building stuck. Soon after their departure the upper floors were remodeled to accommodate office space by architect Robert C. Reamer, usually known for much larger scale projects. Small produce distributors remained in the building along with a rotating mix of small shops, distributors and offices up until the 1960s when many companies left downtown for newly developed industrial areas south of downtown and in Tukwila that gave better access to trucks and trains. During this time many warehouses along Western Avenue fell vacant and many more were demolished for parking lots. The National Building was the oldest remaining warehouse of the many that the Northern Pacific built.

In the early 1980s, the building was acquired by Cornerstone Development Corporation who proceeded to nominate it for the National Register of Historic Places (It was deemed ineligible in a 1979 survey) and began restoring the building for use as offices. When completed they sold the building for $2.16 million to San Francisco-based Seattle Waterfront Associates who as part of their Waterfront Center offices project. The building was added to the Register of April 29, 1982, the same day as the Globe Building, Beebe Building and Hotel Cecil which occupied the other half of the block. One year later the entire block became a City of Seattle landmark under the title "First Avenue Groups/Waterfront Center".

== See also ==
- National Register of Historic Places listings in King County, Washington#Seattle
- List of landmarks in Seattle
