= Union Trust Building (Seattle) =

- U.S. Historic district – Contributing property
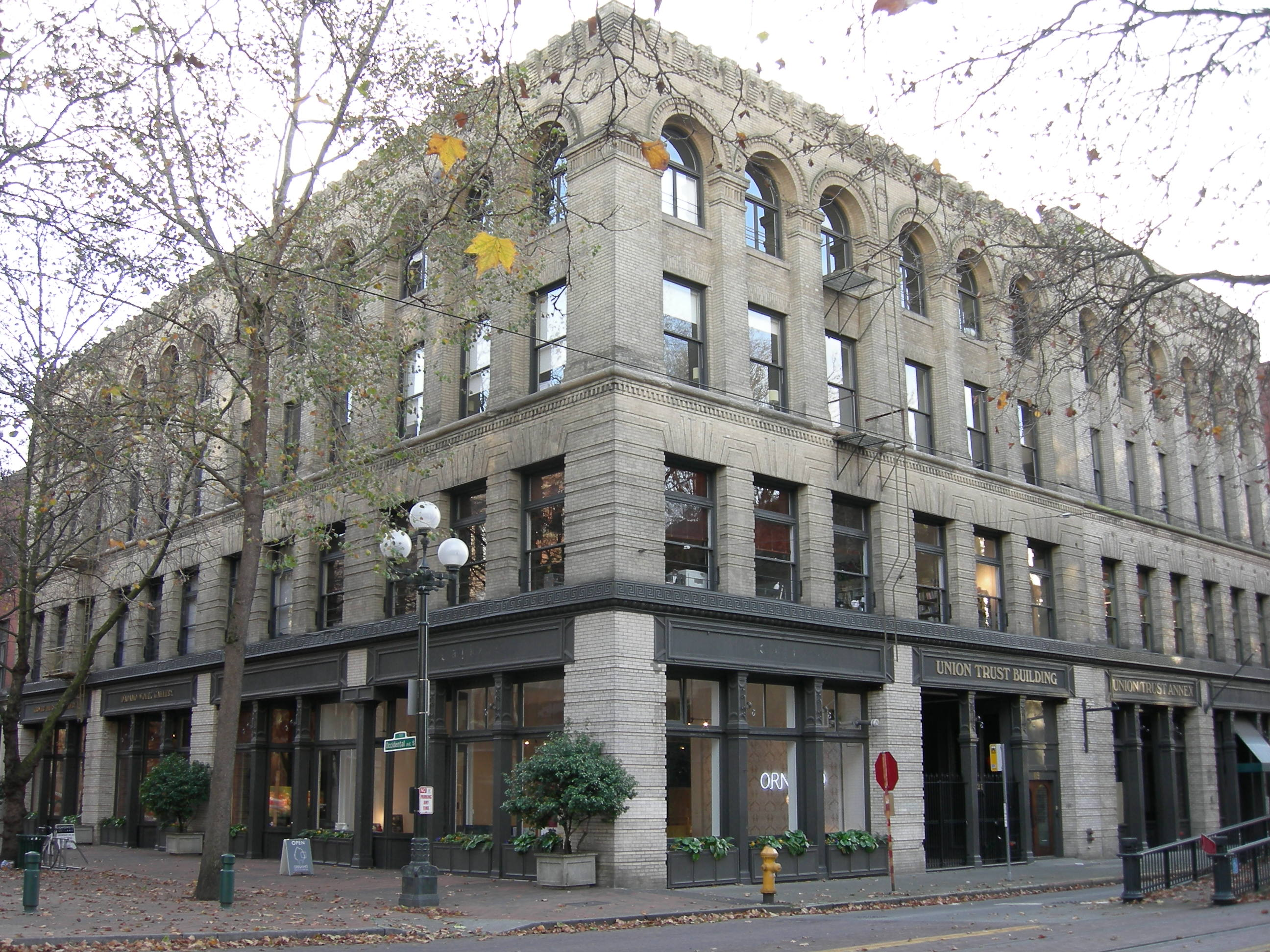
- The building's exterior in 2007

- Location within Downtown Seattle Location within Washington (state)
- Location: 115-119 S Main St; Seattle, Washington, U.S.
- Coordinates: 47°35′59.36″N 122°19′59.93″W
- Built: 1893, 1901 (Annex)
- Architect: Warren Skillings; James Corner; Saunders and Lawton
- Architectural style: Romanesque Revival
- Part of: Pioneer Square Historic District (ID70000086)
- Designated CP: June 22, 1970

The Union Trust Building is a commercial building in Seattle, Washington, United States. Located in the city's Pioneer Square neighborhood, on the corner of Main Street and Occidental Way South (Occidental Mall), it was one of the first rehabilitated buildings in the neighborhood, which is now officially a historic district. In the 1960s, when Pioneer Square was better known as "Skid Road", architect Ralph Anderson purchased the building from investor Sam Israel for $50,000 and set about remodeling it, a project that set a pattern for the next several decades of development in the neighborhood. Anderson also rehabilitated the adjacent Union Trust Annex.

== History ==
=== Before the Fire ===
The entire lot now occupied by the Union Trust Building (the 1893 portion) was originally filled by the 3-story Pacific House, one of the larger wood-frame hotels in Pioneer Square. Designed by Boone & Meeker, It was built from late 1883 to early 1884 by soon-to-be territorial governor Watson C. Squire and was operated by Eben A. Thorndyke. By 1885 The hotel went into receivership and all the fixtures were auctioned off. It continued on under new management until the great fire and despite the announcement of plans for a 3-story brick hotel to take its place immediately, the site would remain vacant for the next several years afterwards.

=== The Union Trust Company ===
The Union Trust Company was incorporated in October 1892 by a wealthy syndicate consisting of bankers Edward O. Graves and Manson F. Backus, attorney Thomas B. Hardin, King County auditor William R. Forrest and now ex-governor Squire with a capital stock of $500,000. The company's purpose would be to manage and develop Squire's numerous property holdings including various subdivisions, the Squire-Latimer Building at First and Main (where they would locate their offices) and the property where the Pacific House had stood, among many others. The future site of the Union Trust Building would be transferred from Squire to the trust company on December 9, 1892.

=== Main Building ===
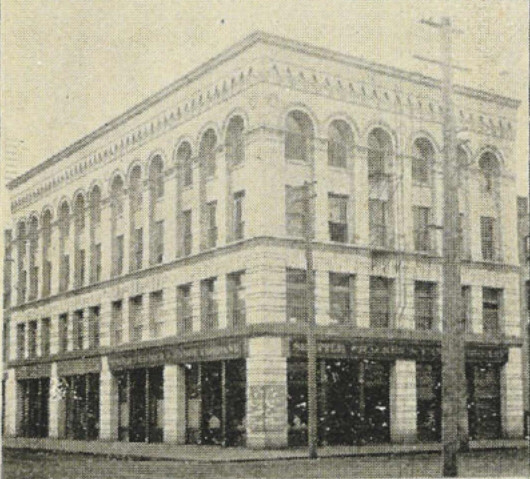
The building in 1900, before the construction of the annex.

Erected in 1893, the four-story building was one of the few substantial buildings built in Seattle that year, owing to the onset of the Panic of 1893. Highly praised at the time of its construction, it was designed by the architectural partnership Skillings and Corner (Warren Porter Skillings and James N. Corner) in a style described as Italian renaissance. The original plan had called for the use of white sandstone on the ground floor and red brick above, but "white" (actually very light gray) brick throughout was chosen instead, an unusual choice for the time, and a trendsetting one. It was also unusual (though not unique) for its time in having electric (rather than hydraulic) elevators.

Used in its early years for a series of wholesale businesses (including Roy & Company, H N. Richmond and Company and John B. Agen), its floors were designed to carry loads of 250 pounds per square foot. The National Grocery Company occupied space in the building until moving into the much larger National Building at Western Avenue and Madison Street in 1904, which is listed on the National Register of Historic Places. The Union Trust Building and most of Squire's Pioneer Square property would be purchased shortly after his 1897 death by New York banker and industrialist Lyman Cornelius Smith who would eventually build the famous Smith Tower.

The building today is largely intact, although it is missing part of its original parapet. This was most likely caused by the 1949 Olympia earthquake which damaged many buildings in the Pioneer Square district.

=== The Union Trust Annex ===
The adjacent Union Trust Annex (1900–1901) continues a similar design. Brothers Paul and Michael James Heney commissioned Saunders and Lawton to design a building matching the Union Trust Building in November 1900. M.J. Heney was a contractor in the Yukon who had been responsible for building most of the White Pass and Yukon Route from Skagway to Whitehorse and used the profits from that project to invest in Seattle property. The name Union Trust Annex dates only from the 1970s. It was built for Ernest Thurlow, and was intended for his Superior Candy and Cracker Company; the Seattle Cracker and Candy Company was already operating in the adjacent Union Trust Building. Superior Candy and Cracker Company occupied the entire annex building from March 1901 to 1915.

Unlike the Union Trust Building, the Union Trust Annex retains all of its original parapet.

The Union Trust Annex was the original home of the Seattle Unit of the Klondike Gold Rush National Historical Park, opening in 1979 after several years of work. That move one block south and one block east in 2005 to new quarters in the former Cadillac Hotel.
