= Albert Bumgardner =

American architect (1921–1987)

- Born: Albert Orin Bumgardner; January 3, 1921; Springfield, Illinois, United States
- Died: July 10, 1987 (aged 66); Seattle, Washington, United States
- Education: University of Illinois Urbana-Champaign
- Occupation: Architect
- Years active: 1950s–1980s

Albert Orin Bumgardner (January 3, 1921 – July 10, 1987) was an American architect. Born in Springfield, Illinois, he attended the Illinois State University in Normal before serving in the United States Army Air Corps during World War II. After the war, he studied architecture at the University of Illinois, where he graduated in 1949. He moved to Seattle, where he worked at various firms before beginning his own practice in early 1953. He gained acclaim from architecture press and the American Institute of Architects for a number of house designs. His firm, Bumgardner Partnership, gained further notability following their office design for the periodical Pacific Architect & Builder; this led to institutional contracts that saw Bumgardner lead design projects at Evergreen State College and the University of Washington. He oversaw designs for a number of projects along the Seattle Waterfront during the 1970s and 1980s, including Waterfront Park and the Watermark Tower.

== Early life and education ==
On January 3, 1921, Albert Orin Bumgardner was born in Springfield, Illinois to Alfred Orin Bumgardner, a mechanic, and his second wife, Florence Lonas. He grew up in Chatham, Illinois, and attended the Illinois State University in Normal from 1941 to 1943. He served in the United States Army Air Corps during World War II. Through the Army Specialized Training Program, he trained at a station in Louisiana before studying engineering at the City College of New York for 1943–1944. In 1946, following the end of the war, he returned to school at the University of Illinois, where he graduated with a Bachelor of Architecture in 1949.

== Career ==
After graduating, Bumgardner moved to Seattle, where he briefly worked for the Army Corps of Engineers before he was hired as a draftsman and specifications writer for architect Ralph Burkhard. In 1952, he left Burkhard's employment and briefly worked at various firms before beginning his own independent practice in January 1953. He briefly partnered with Gene Zema in the mid-1950s. His practice initially worked out of a home office at his residence on East Broadway, where he was joined in 1957 by two employees, both graduates from the University of Washington. One of them, Peter Parsons, became a full partner of Bumgardner's firm, and its name was changed to Bumgardner Partnership.

Bumgardner's early designs for private residences in Seattle received acclaim, with his Thomas Graham House (1956), Wallace Reed House (1959), and Chester Bartholomew House (1960) all winning the Seattle American Institute of Architects's Home of the Year award. In 1958, he was hired as an architectural advisor for the Pacific Architect & Builder periodical, accompanied by a showcase of the Graham House. His work was featured frequently in subsequent issues of the Architect & Builder, as well as in the magazine Sunset.

In 1960, Bumgardner was commissioned to design a new office for the Architect & Builder in Eastlake, Seattle. This design was widely publicized into architectural press, and resulted in a number of higher-profile commissions for his firm, especially with educational institutions. He designed the student residence halls and Seminar Building of the Evergreen State College in 1971–1972, the Port Ludlow Beach Club in 1972, and the South Campus Center of the University of Washington in 1974. His firm, renamed Bumgardner Architects in 1980, hired a number of prominent local architects, including David H. Fukui and Jennie Sue Brown. During the 1970s and 1980s, he oversaw a number of mixed-use developments near the Seattle Waterfront, including Waterfront Park (built 1974), Market Place North (built 1979–1982), Waterfront Place (1979–1984), the Watermark Tower (1983), and the conversion of the Globe Building into the Alexis Hotel (1982).

=== Civic work and death ===
Bumgardner was a member of the American Institute of Architects from 1954 until his death. He was the treasurer of the organization's Seattle chapter in 1956 and 1957, and served as chapter president from 1962 to 1963. He was elected as an AIA Fellow in 1971. He became involved with a number of local planning boards and organizations; he was the chairman of Seattle's Joint Commission of the Planning Commission and the Commission on Historic Zoning during the early 1970s, and helped to draft legislation to create the Pioneer Square Historic District. Mayor Wesley C. Uhlman named him to head the first Seattle Design Commission. He was a member of the Allied Arts of Seattle. Bumgardner died in Seattle on July 10, 1987.

== Works ==
Designs by Albert Bumgardner
Name	Location	Date	Ref.
Thomas J. Graham House	Seattle	1952–1954	
Wallace Reed House	Seattle	1959	
Allison Apartments	Seattle	1959	
Chester Bartholomew House	Seattle	1959	
Pacific Architect & Builder Offices	Eastlake, Seattle	1960	
House	4429 Forest Avenue SE, Mercer Island	1960	
House	3019 60th Avenue SE, Mercer Island	1963	
Applied Physics Lab (remodel)	University of Washington, Seattle	1964	
House	8846 Overlake Drive E, Medina	1966	
House (addition)	3009 60th Avenue SE, Mercer Island	1968	
House	9428 SE 54th Street, Mercer Island	1968	
Arts Addition	Western Washington University, Bellingham	1968	
Residence Halls	Evergreen State College, Olympia	1971–1972	
South Campus Center	University of Washington, Seattle	1971–1974	
Seminar Building	Evergreen State College, Olympia	1972	
Port Ludlow Beach Club	Port Ludlow	1972	
Tulalip Community Center	Tulalip Indian Reservation	1974	
Waterfront Park	Seattle	1974	
Summit Tower Apartments	766 Belmont Avenue E, Seattle	1974	
Theime House	1500 Eastshore Drive, Whidbey Island	1975	
Market Place North	Seattle	1978–1982	
Waterfront Place	Seattle	1979–1984	
Globe Building (remodel)	Seattle	1982	
Watermark Tower	Seattle	1983	
Queen Anne High School (renovation)	Queen Anne, Seattle	1986	
