= Brian Ebersole (politician) =

American politician

35th Mayor of Tacoma
- In office January 1, 1996 – January 1, 2001
- Preceded by: Harold Moss
- Succeeded by: Mike Crowley (interim)

44th Speaker of the Washington House of Representatives
- In office January 11, 1993 – January 9, 1995
- Preceded by: Joseph E. King
- Succeeded by: Clyde Ballard

Majority Leader of the Washington House of Representatives
- In office January 11, 1988 – January 11, 1993
- Preceded by: Pat McMullen
- Succeeded by: W. Kim Peery

Minority Leader of the Washington House of Representatives
- In office January 9, 1995 – January 8, 1996
- Preceded by: Clyde Ballard
- Succeeded by: Marlin Appelwick

Member of the Washington House of Representatives from the 29th district
- In office January 10, 1983 – January 1, 1996
- Preceded by: Wendell B. Brown
- Succeeded by: Carl Scheuerman

Personal details
- Born: October 10, 1947 (age 78) Tennessee, U.S.
- Party: Democratic
- Relations: Father, Dr. Luke E. Ebersole, Vice Chancellor of the University of Tennessee, Mother, Margaret C. Ebersole, first grade teacher

Brian Ebersole (born October 10, 1947) was an American politician in the state of Washington. He served in the Washington House of Representatives from 1983 to 1997. He was Speaker of the House from 1993 to 1995. He also served as mayor of Tacoma, Washington.

Originally from Tennessee, Brian Ebersole obtained a B.S. in political science from the University of Tennessee and a M.Sc. in educational psychology from the University of Connecticut. After graduation, he moved to Tacoma and worked as college administrator and teacher. He was first elected to the Washington House of Representatives in 1983 and served as House Majority Leader from 1987 to 1993 and as 41st Speaker of the House from 1993 to 1995. He lost the speakership after 1994 elections, which saw Republican Clyde Ballard win the gavel. He then served as minority leader until May 1995, when he announced his intentions to run for mayor of Tacoma. He won this election with around 65% of the vote and went on to serve from 1996 to 2001. After his time as mayor, Ebersole worked as president of Bates Technical College from 2000 to 2003. In 2018, he opened an art gallery in Tacoma.

== See also ==
- List of mayors of Tacoma, Washington

Washington House of Representatives
Preceded by Clyde Ballard	Minority Leader of the Washington House of Representatives; 1995–1996	Succeeded by Marlin Appelwick
