= Marlin Appelwick =

American politician

Judge of the Court of Appeals of Washington, Division I
- In office July 1, 1998 – March 31, 2022
- Preceded by: Seat established
- Succeeded by: Janet Chung

Minority Leader of the Washington House of Representatives
- In office January 8, 1996 – June 16, 1998
- Preceded by: Brian Ebersole
- Succeeded by: Frank Chopp

Member of the Washington House of Representatives from the 46th district
- In office January 10, 1983 – June 16, 1998
- Preceded by: Irv Greengo
- Succeeded by: Brian Peyton

Personal details
- Born: Marlin Jon Appelwick; July 2, 1953 (age 73)
- Party: Democratic
- Education: Minnesota State University (BA, BS); University of Washington (JD)
- Profession: Lawyer, jurist

Marlin Jon Appelwick (born July 2, 1953) was a judge of the Washington Court of Appeals, Division I, who served from 1998 until his retirement in 2022.

== Biography ==
Judge Appelwick first ran for election to the Washington Court of Appeals in 1998. He ran unopposed again in 2018 and retired from the court on March 31, 2022. Before becoming a judge, Judge Appelwick practiced law for 18 years in family law, business law, and mediation. Judge Appelwick was also a member of the Washington State Legislature for 16 years. He received both a BA and a BS in mathematics from the Minnesota State University, Mankato in 1976 and his JD from the University of Washington School of Law in 1979.

Washington House of Representatives
Preceded by Brian Ebersole	Minority Leader of the Washington House of Representatives; 1996–1998	Succeeded by Frank Chopp
