= Agen Warehouse =

- U.S. National Register of Historic Places
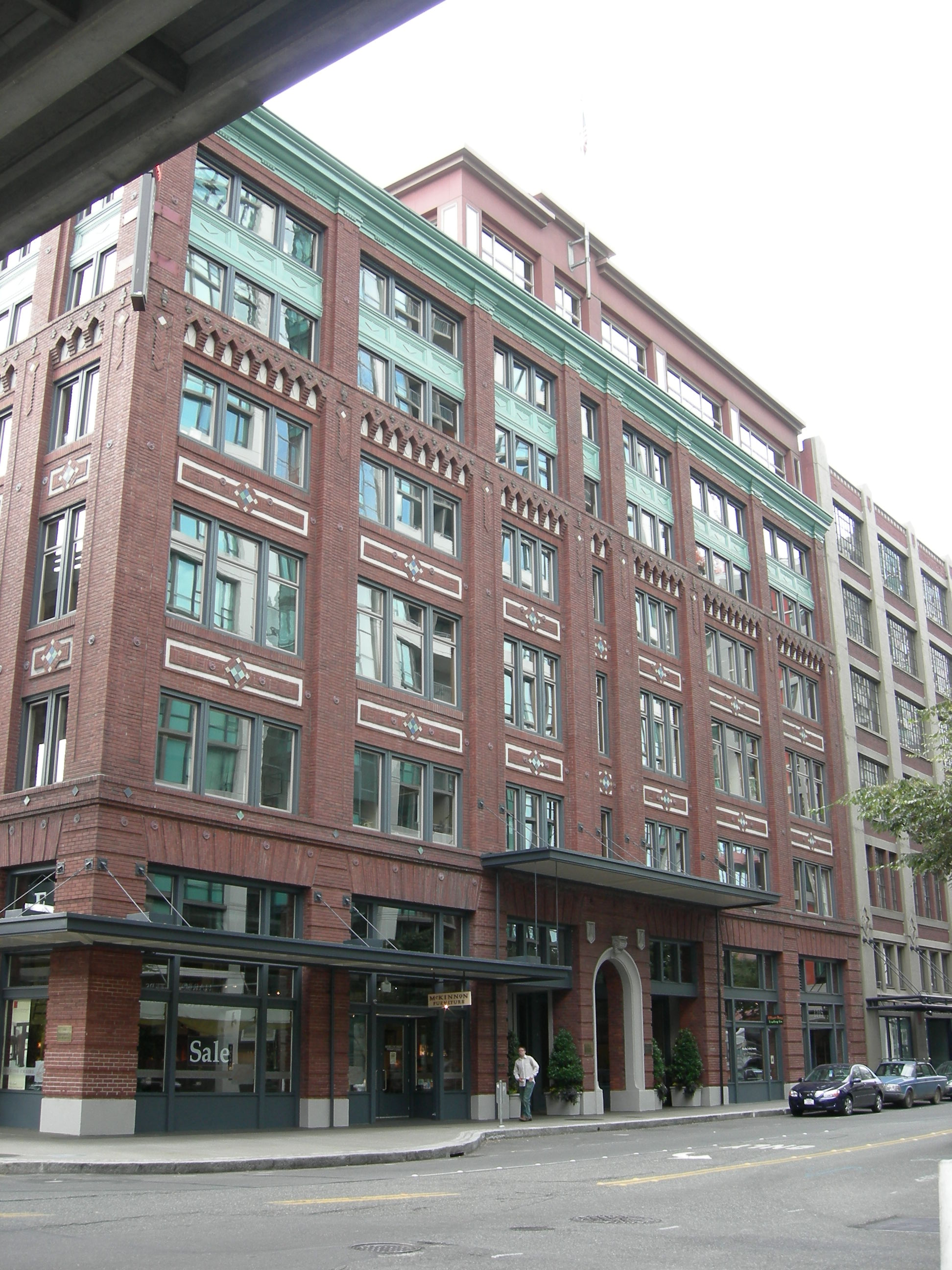
- The building's exterior in 2007

- Location within Downtown Seattle
- Location: 1201 Western Ave., Seattle, Washington
- Coordinates: 47°36′21″N 122°20′21″W
- Built: 1910 & 1911
- Architect: John Graham, Sr. David J. Myers
- Architectural style: Beaux Arts
- NRHP reference No.: 97001673
- Added to NRHP: January 23, 1998

The Agen Warehouse, also known as the 1201 Western Building, is an historic former warehouse building located at 1201 Western Avenue in Seattle, Washington. Originally constructed in 1910 for John B. Agen (1856–1920), widely considered the father of the modern dairy industry in the Pacific Northwest, for his wholesale dairy commission business, it was designed by the partnership of John Graham, Sr. and David J. Myers with later additions designed by Graham alone. After years of industrial use, the building was fully restored to its present appearance in 1986 for offices and retail with the addition of a penthouse and was added to the National Register of Historic Places on January 23, 1998.

== History ==
=== John Agen's Dairy Empire ===
John Bernard Agen was born in 1856 and was raised on his family's large dairy farm near Arcade, New York, where he began working in the dairy industry professionally by age 15. In 1876, at age 20, he relocated to Osage, in Northern Iowa where he worked as a dairy farm-hand. The following year he became a full-time dealer and by the mid-1880s had built his own creamery and cold storage plant and had a network of farmers across several states. In June 1889, encouraged by a large sale to a friend in Seattle and seeking new markets, he decided to go west to take advantage of the clear demand for his products. By the time he reached Helena, Montana, news had broken that downtown Seattle had been destroyed by fire on June 6. Now torn on whether to take his chances in Seattle or Tacoma, he decided to stick with Seattle.

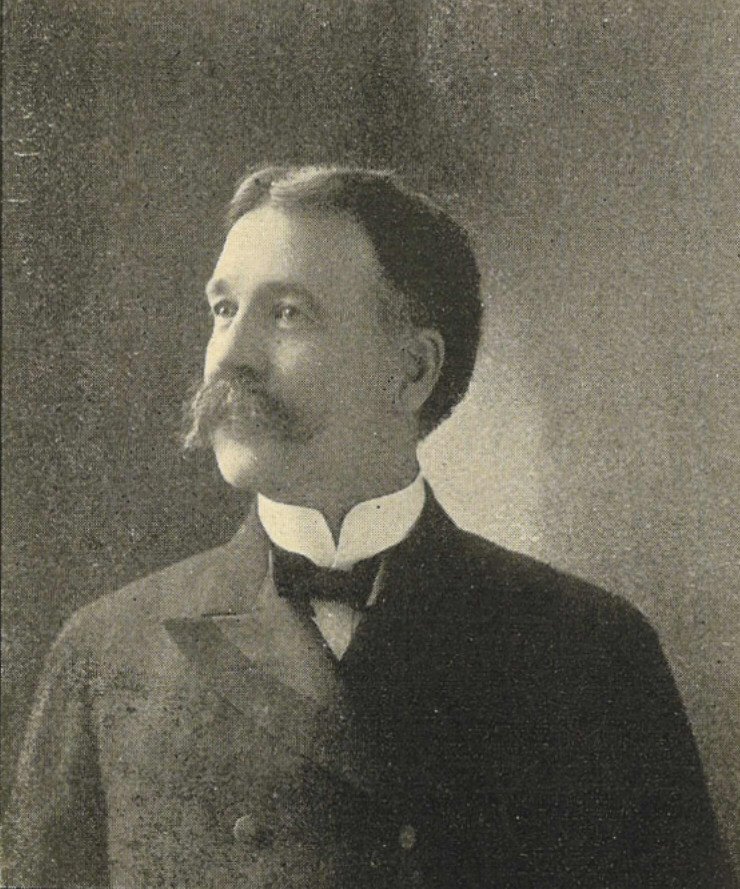
John Agen, c.1900

Upon arriving in Seattle, Agen opened his commission business in the city's burgeoning wholesale district on Western Avenue, only recently created over filled-in waterfront. Dealing primarily in dairy products shipped from his cold storage and creamery plant back in Osage, his business boomed because he could sell cheaper than local products. Agen soon began setting up local suppliers, establishing a branch creamery at Mount Vernon in 1890. Agen advanced startup money and credit to numerous farmers in the White River Valley and Skagit County, helping kickstart the dairy industry in areas that would later become famous for it and helping end the West's dependence on Eastern suppliers. Agen would build and operate creameries in Yakima, Centralia, Enumclaw, O'Brien, Burlington, Dungeness and Oak Harbor, eventually producing a quarter million pounds of milk per day by the 1910s. His own brand of Iowa fancy creamery butter soon became a household name throughout the Pacific Northwest. With the only cold storage locker in Seattle at the time, he was able to stockpile more product than anyone else and by 1891 was making $30,000 a month in profits and quickly became one of Seattle's business elite, gaining the moniker "Butter King of the Pacific Coast". The following year he and his wife had a mansion constructed on First Hill, but she would die of pneumonia only two years later.

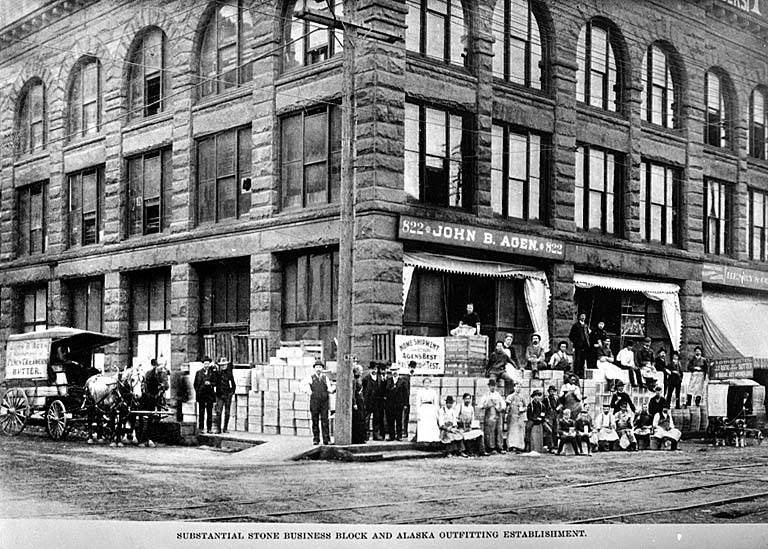
Agen's headquarters in the Colman Annex, late 1890s

In 1893 Agen planned to move his business into the newly constructed Union Trust Building in the Pioneer Square neighborhood but chose to stay on Western Avenue when property-owner James Colman decided to replace the building Agen occupied at Marion Street with a three-story fireproof warehouse, completed by 1897. In 1895 his business was nearly destroyed for the second time since the great fire when a corrugated iron building he was storing cheese in burned to the ground. Despite setbacks, he opened branch warehouses in Tacoma and Portland and his business continued to thrive through the Panic of 1893 and only became stronger when the Yukon Gold Rush brought thousands of prospectors to Seattle seeking provisions. It was said that every steamer heading to Alaska carried Agen's products. The demand led to Agen establishing stores in Dawson, Skagway, Valdez, and Nome, among other places along the prospector trail. With Agen's shrewd business sense his company became one of the foremost organizations of its kind in the country and his trade soon even extended across to the Pacific to China, Japan and throughout the south Pacific.

=== Agen's Warehouse ===
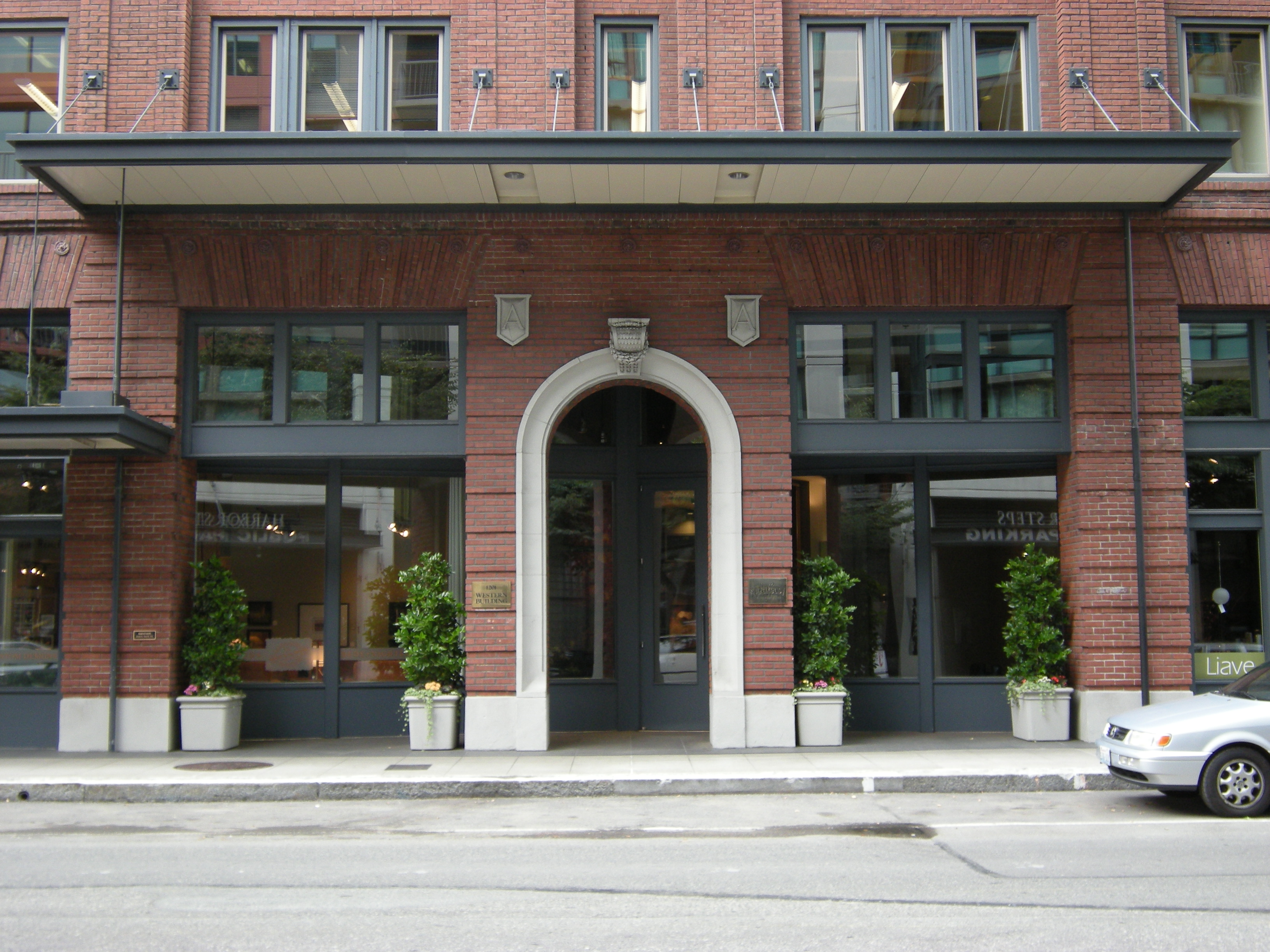
The building's Western Avenue entrance in 2009

By the end of the 1900s, Agen was a millionaire and one of the most well known dairy merchants on the Pacific Coast, but his Seattle warehouse was still in rented space in the Colman Block Annex. In February 1910 he commissioned architects Graham & Myers to design an $94,000 three-story brick and timber-frame warehouse for his new property at the Northwest corner of Western Avenue and Seneca Street. Plans were completed on March 5 and the next day contracts were awarded to J.M. Bruce & Co. for driving the timber piles for the foundation, with prominent Seattle builder Matthew Dow receiving the general construction contract. By the end of the month the plans were revised with an additional story. Even this proved to be inadequate for Agen's increasing needs so he commissioned John Graham, now working alone, to design an additional two floors in January 1911, a mere two months after the original building was finished. This addition required the reinforcement and replacement of structural beams in the lower floors, the relocation of an elevator and other tweaks in the floor plan, reflecting the unexpected change of plans. Per the original plans, the ground floor fronting Western Avenue housed rental retail space, offices and service rooms for Agen employees as well as a mezzanine breaking up the 19'6" high ceilings, which contained offices toilets and lockers, greatly expanded during the 1911 renovations. The remainder of the floor housed candling rooms for inspecting eggs, a creamery, a testing room and a refrigerator room as well as the loading docks, facing what used to be the rail yards on Alaskan Way. Across from this was Agen's own shipping dock, Originally built by the Northern Pacific Railway as Pier 5, and now known as Pier 56. All the floors above the first were open warehouse space which were rented out to the Fischer Bros. wholesale grocery company, among others.

=== After Agen ===
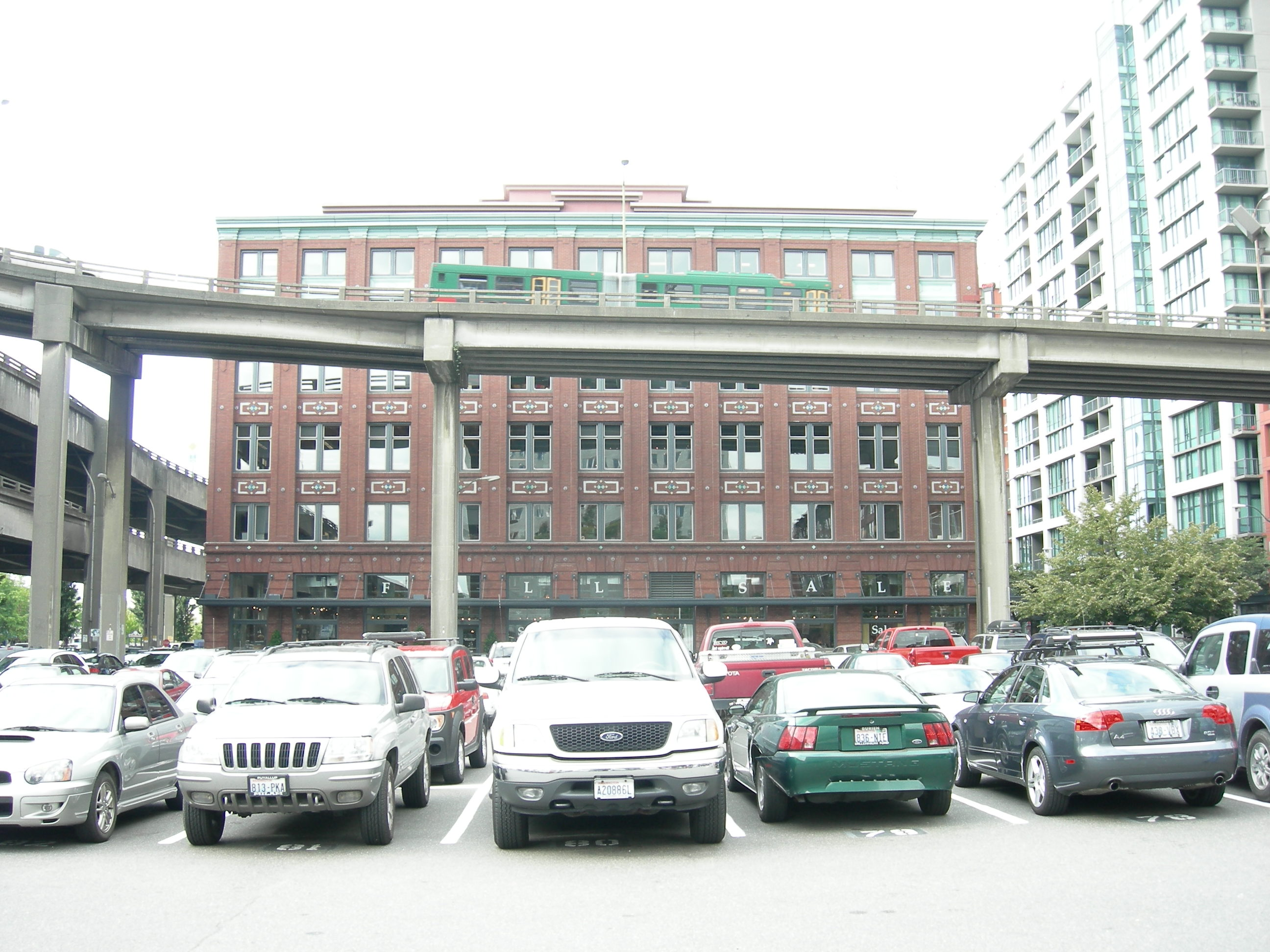
The building behind an exit from the Alaskan Way Viaduct (SR-99), 2007

In order to focus on the Mount Vernon-based milk business which had proven to be the most profitable, Agen sold the butter, egg and cheese business to C.G. Bradner in January 1914. Two years later, in October 1916, he sold all of his condenseries for $1,000,000 in cash to Charles E. Peabody who in turn sold them to Agen's only major competitor, the Carnation Company. After Agen and Carnation left, the Agen Building in Seattle continued to house wholesale grocery & coffee companies. In the late 1920s it was the distribution center for the Puget Sound Quality Stores chain and in 1932 was purchased by the Charles D. Stimson Corportion, who had it divided into smaller spaces with an even larger variety of wholesale and industrial tenants, the most prominent being the Olympic Cold Storage Company. In 1944 the building underwent a $60,000 renovation by Olympic to convert the 2nd through 4th floors into a modern cold storage facility. The interior was insulated with cork and partitioned which necessitated all the windows being filled in and the skylights removed. Olympic would purchase the building outright from the Stimson Corp. in 1958.

The building underwent a $5.8 million restoration in 1986 as part of the Waterfront Place project which saw many buildings in the area restored into apartments and office space and listed on the National Register of Historic Places. All of the exterior windows of the Agen were reopened with designs echoing the originals, based on Graham's original drawings (though using single pivoting sash rather than double hung as originally built), and a penthouse was constructed over two-thirds of the building's roof. The upper floors were converted to class-A office space while the ground floor was returned to retail use, for years housing McKinnon furniture and later art galleries. Though now known as the 1201 Western Building, it was added to the National Register of Historic Places as the Agen Warehouse on January 23, 1998.

== See also ==
- List of Seattle landmarks
- National Register of Historic Places listings in Seattle, Washington
