= L. Jane Hastings =

American architect (1928–2024)

- Born: March 3, 1928; Seattle, Washington, U.S.
- Died: March 25, 2024 (aged 96)
- Education: University of Washington
- Occupation: Architect
- Awards: AIA annual "Home of the Month" award, 1968 AIA Seattle Medal, 1995. AIA NW & Pacific Region Medal of Honor, 2002
- Practice: L. Jane Hastings, Architect Hastings Group
- Buildings: Cunningham Hall, University of Washington Sea-Tac International Airport Renovation

Lois Jane Hastings, known on occasion as Jane Hastings, (March 3, 1928 – March 25, 2024) was an American architect, a Fellow of the American Institute of Architects and the first woman to serve as chancellor of the AIA College of Fellows. Her architecture firm, the Hastings Group, designed over 500 mostly residential buildings in the Seattle area.

== Biography ==
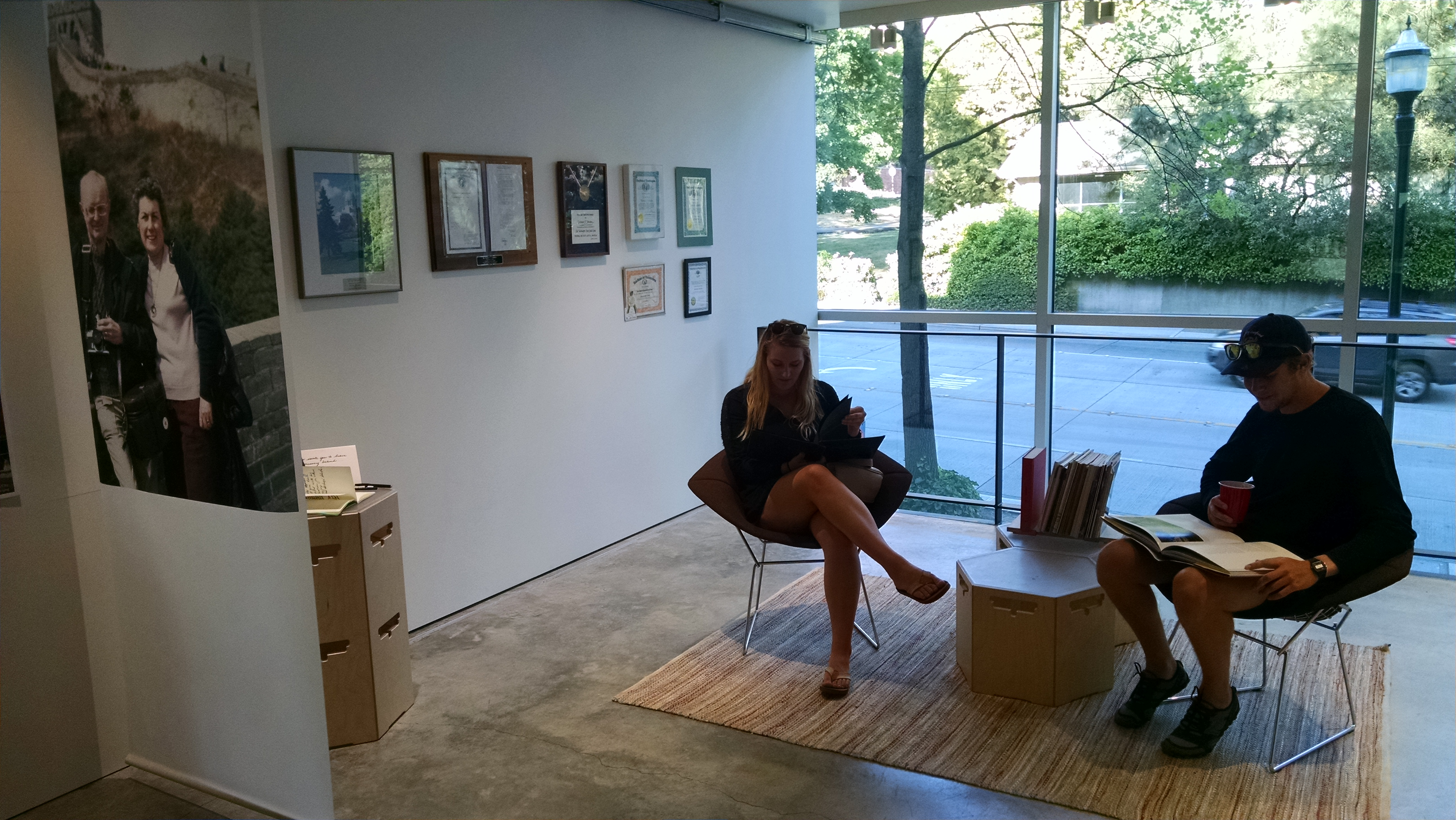
Norman Johnston and L. Jane Hastings Gallery in Gould Hall, University of Washington.

Born and raised in Seattle, Hastings studied architecture at the University of Washington, the only woman in a class of 200. Graduating in 1952, the following year she became only the eighth woman to be licensed as an architect in the State of Washington. She then spent a couple of years with the U.S. Army in Germany. On returning to Seattle, she worked for a number of architecture firms, gaining experience on a variety of building types including schools, industrial premises, housing, offices and cultural institutions. In 1961, she became independent as "L. Jane Hastings, Architect", establishing an office in the university district. In 1974, she moved to downtown offices creating the "Hastings Group" with a number of other architects including Carolyn Geise and Cynthia Richardson who later established practices of their own. The group completed over 500 mainly residential projects in the Seattle area by 1995. Other commissions included the remodeling of commercial and university facilities, renovations at Sea-Tac Airport, a highway bridge approach and, in 1976, the historic restoration of a Tulalip Indian Tribal building. Projects also included the renovation of the University of Washington's Cunningham Hall in order to serve as the campus's women's center.

From 1969 to 1980, Hastings lectured part-time in Design Studies at the University of Washington and in Architectural Drafting at the Seattle Community College. She was an active member of the American Institute of Architects (AIA) and the International Union of Women Architects (IUWA). She became a Fellow of the AIA in 1980 and the first woman chancellor of the AIA College of Fellows in 1992.

Hastings died on March 25, 2024, at the age of 96.

== Projects ==
1975, Johnston-Hastings House The Hastings Group, Architects. 3905 NE Belvoir Pl., Seattle, WA

== Awards ==
Hastings received the AIA annual "Home of the Month" award in 1968 and the AIA Seattle Medal in 1995. In 2002, she was the first recipient ever to receive the AIA NW & Pacific Region Medal of Honor for "accomplishments over more than four decades of AIA activism".
