= Paul Kraabel =

American politician

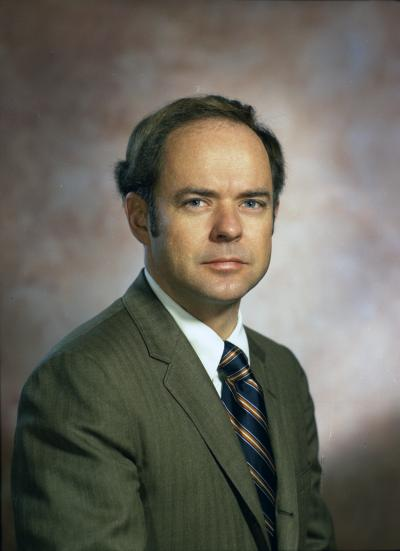
- Kraabel in 1971

President of the Seattle City Council
- In office January 3, 1990 – January 3, 1992
- Preceded by: Sam Smith
- Succeeded by: George Benson
- In office January 3, 1980 – January 3, 1982
- Preceded by: John R. Miller
- Succeeded by: Jeanette Williams

Member of the Seattle City Council. Position 5
- In office February 5, 1975 – January 3, 1992
- Preceded by: Bruce K. Chapman
- Succeeded by: Margaret Pageler

Member of the Washington House of Representatives from the 46th district
- In office January 11, 1971 – February 5, 1975
- Preceded by: George W. Scott
- Succeeded by: Irv Greengo

Personal details
- Born: Paul Benjamin Kraabel; February 2, 1933 Seattle, Washington, U.S.
- Died: August 12, 2016 (aged 83) Seattle, Washington, U.S.
- Party: Republican
- Education: University of Washington
- Occupation: Electronics engineer

Paul Benjamin Kraabel (February 2, 1933 – August 12, 2016) was an American politician and engineer in the state of Washington. Kraabel was an engineer for 15 years, most of that time working for the Boeing Company. He was elected to the Legislature as a representative in 1971, holding office for four years. He represented the 46th district from 1971 to 1975. and served for 16 years on the Seattle City Council from 1974 to 1991.

Kraabel was appointed to Seattle City Council in 1975, filling a seat vacated by Bruce Chapman. He won a special election for the unexpired term and served on the Council until 1991, serving four terms. He served as the council president from 1990-1991. He returned briefly to serve an interim councilmember from August to November 1996.

Seattle Mayor Norm Rice, who served on the council with Kraabel in the 1980s, described Kraabel to the Seattle Times: "He was a very solid rudder in moving the city around issues of land use," Rice said.

On the City Council Paul was involved in many issues that helped Seattle grow and thrive while also trying to preserve important elements of the city's past. He worked on the Downtown Plan and worked to protect the International District and Pioneer Square from development that would damage these unique neighborhoods and business districts.

Kraabel was an advocate for transit. When the downtown transit Tunnel was being developed he worked to meet the transit needs of the growing city while mitigating the impacts on Cascade, the International District that the 3rd and Union area downtown.

His advocacy for low income housing extended to Olympia where he met with then State Senator Jim McDermott in support of establishing the Housing Trust Fund. Since its establishment in 1989, the Housing Trust Fund has created or preserved more than 35,000 homes in 38 of Washington’s 39 counties. It has leveraged more than $3 billion in private and public sector support. Housing Trust Fund money is matched by other funds at a ratio of more than four to one.

in 1987 the council enacted the Housing Preservation Ordinance (Ordinance 109973) While the ordinance was later struck down by the courts, its aim was to required owners of property that was being used for low income housing to get approval before they could tear down or change the housing and to replace a percentage of the housing that would be lost or pay into a housing replacement fund.

When he returned to the city council to complete Tom Weeks' term the council members had this to say about Kraabel:

"He's a gift to us. He knows the system, he knows us and he can get up to speed quickly," said Councilwoman Jane Noland, who, along with Councilwomen Cheryl Chow and Sue Donaldson have served on the council with Kraabel.

"As a new council member, with the loss of Tom Weeks who had a lot of institutional memory, I'm excited to have someone with even more institutional memory so I can pick his brain," said Councilwoman Tina Podlodowski.

Paul lived in the Eastlake floating homes community for many years and worked to preserve the viability of floating homes when he was a city council member.

After leaving the council, Kraabel was involved with many community organizations including Seattle Community College, where he served as the board chair. He also served on the boards for Summer Nights at the Pier, the Seattle International Children's Festival, the International District Village Square and One Reel Productions. He died in Seattle of a subdural hematoma on August 12, 2016.
