= Ralph Anderson (architect) =

American architect

Ralph D. Anderson
- Anderson in 1967
- Born: October 21, 1924; Seattle, Washington, U.S.
- Died: October 24, 2010 (aged 86); Seattle, Washington, U.S.
- Education: University of Washington
- Occupation: Architect
- Known for: Restoration of Pioneer Square and Pike Place Market
- Spouse: Shirley Anderson (m. 1957)
- Children: 2

Ralph D. Anderson (October 21, 1924 – October 24, 2010) was an American architect from Seattle, Washington. He was a founder of Ralph Anderson and Partners, later Anderson Koch Smith. Much of his work is modernist, and he is also associated with preservationism. He was an early and significant contributor (including as an investor) to the restoration of Seattle's Pioneer Square neighborhood, and also participated in restoration projects along First Avenue in the Pike Place Market Historical District in the 1970s.

== Early life and career ==
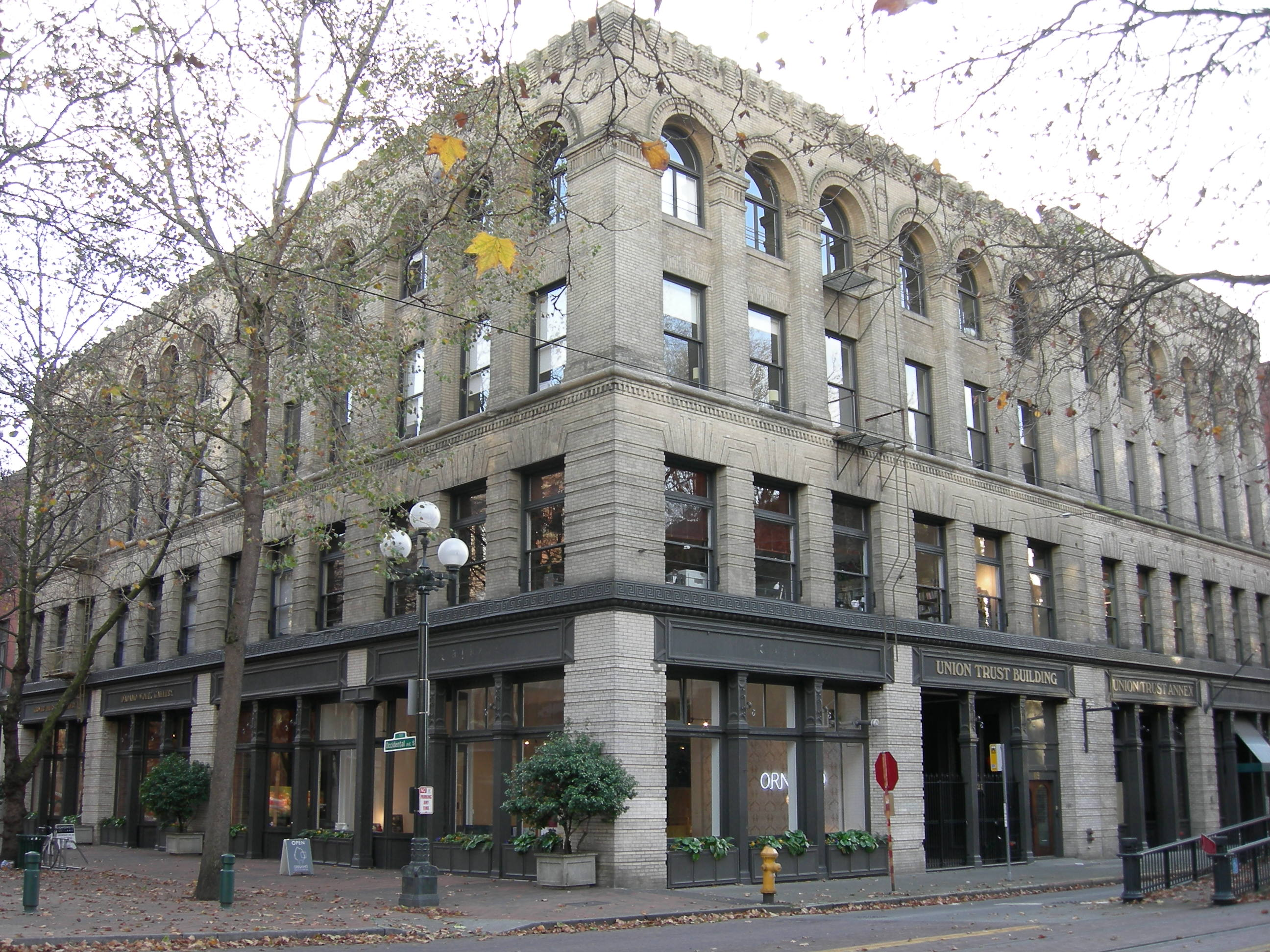
Union Trust Building and Annex (2007).

Anderson was born in Seattle in 1924, the second of three sons. He was raised in the Magnolia neighborhood of the city and attended Queen Anne High School; for a time he was enlisted with the Army Air Corps.

Anderson went on to graduate from the University of Washington Architecture School in his native Seattle in 1951 and received his Washington State architectural license in 1954. He worked several years for architect Paul H. Kirk before opening his own practice. His early work, including his own first home at Hidden Lake, constituted what he later called his "modernist glass-box phase". Having discovered how difficult it was to heat such a house he moved on to what he called a "Northwest design style. ""I tried to use a lot of wood, and I tried to work with the contours, textures and vegetation of the Northwest, the wooded environment. Quite often I would have big, hovering roofs that would open up to the view." The style was also characterized by "broad windows", "exposed framing", "an emphasis on verticality" and often "a formal T-shape plan." Many of these houses were set to take advantage of views of water or mountains. He styled himself "the poor man's Roland Terry."

After about a decade of building houses mainly in the Eastside Seattle suburbs of Mercer Island and Bellevue, Anderson opened an office at 108 S. Jackson in Pioneer Square, then known as Skid Road. It was a derelict neighborhood, and there was little concern for the mostly turn-of-the century buildings: people bought and sold land considering the old buildings relatively incidental. Along with Richard White, later of Foster/White Gallery, Anderson was among the first to see the potential of the neighborhood. He mortgaged his house to buy the Union Trust Building from Sam Israel and moved his office there (this may have been the only building Israel ever sold). His renovation of the Union Trust Building and later of the Grand Central Hotel contributed flagship buildings to what is once again a vibrant district.

== Pike-Market neighborhood ==
The breadth of Anderson's work can be seen in the Pike-Market neighborhood. Within the Pike Place Market Historical District he was involved in the joint remodel of the historic Smith Block, Butterworth Building, and Alaska Trade Building and the nearby Fairmount Hotel in 1977. Four years later, he was one of the architects of Marketplace North, the modernist "stepped wedge" immediately north of the Historical District north between Western and First Avenues, north of Virginia Street. Among the tenants of the remodeled Smith / Butterworth / Alaska Trade buildings is the Seattle chapter of the American Institute of Architects.

== Rehabilitation ==
Anderson rehabilitated numerous other old Seattle buildings, including the 1977 remodel of the American Can Company Building into the Seattle International Trade Center. Restoration projects elsewhere in Washington state around that time included the Fort Worden Commander House in Port Townsend) and the Company Store in Port Gamble.

== Personal life ==
On May 24, 1957, Anderson married his wife Shirley, a physician, with whom he had two sons.

Anderson died at the Horizon House retirement community in Seattle's Capitol Hill neighborhood on October 24, 2010, at the age of 86, after suffering a recurrence of kidney cancer which he had battled in his fifties.

== Colleagues ==
Among the prominent Seattle architects who worked for Anderson at some point in their careers are George Suyama, David Fukui, Jim Olson, Jerry Stickney, Ron Murphy, Jack R. Vincent and Gordon Walker. T. William Booth and Robert Koch joined Anderson's partnership in 1980, and Glen Duarte in 1985.

== Partial list of buildings ==
=== Restoration and rehabilitation ===
- Capitol Brewing / Jackson Building (1963, Pioneer Square, Seattle)
- Union Trust Building (1965, Pioneer Square, Seattle)
- Grand Central Hotel, also known as a Squire-Latimer Building, now officially Grand Central on the Park (1971/1972, Pioneer Square, Seattle)
- Fisher Studio Building (1974, Downtown Seattle)
- Pioneer Building (1970–1975, Pioneer Square, Seattle)
- Smith Block, Butterworth Building, and Alaska Trade Building (1977, Pike Place Market Historical District, Seattle)
- Fort Worden Commander House (1976, Port Townsend, Washington; also known as "Commandant's House")
- Company Store (Port Gamble, Washington)
- Fairmount Hotel (1977, Pike Place Market Historical District, Seattle)
- American Can Company Building (1976–1977, Belltown / Central Waterfront, Seattle). This was the conversion to turn this building into the Seattle International Trade Center. It was later refitted again in 1999 as the headquarters of RealNetworks.

=== New buildings ===
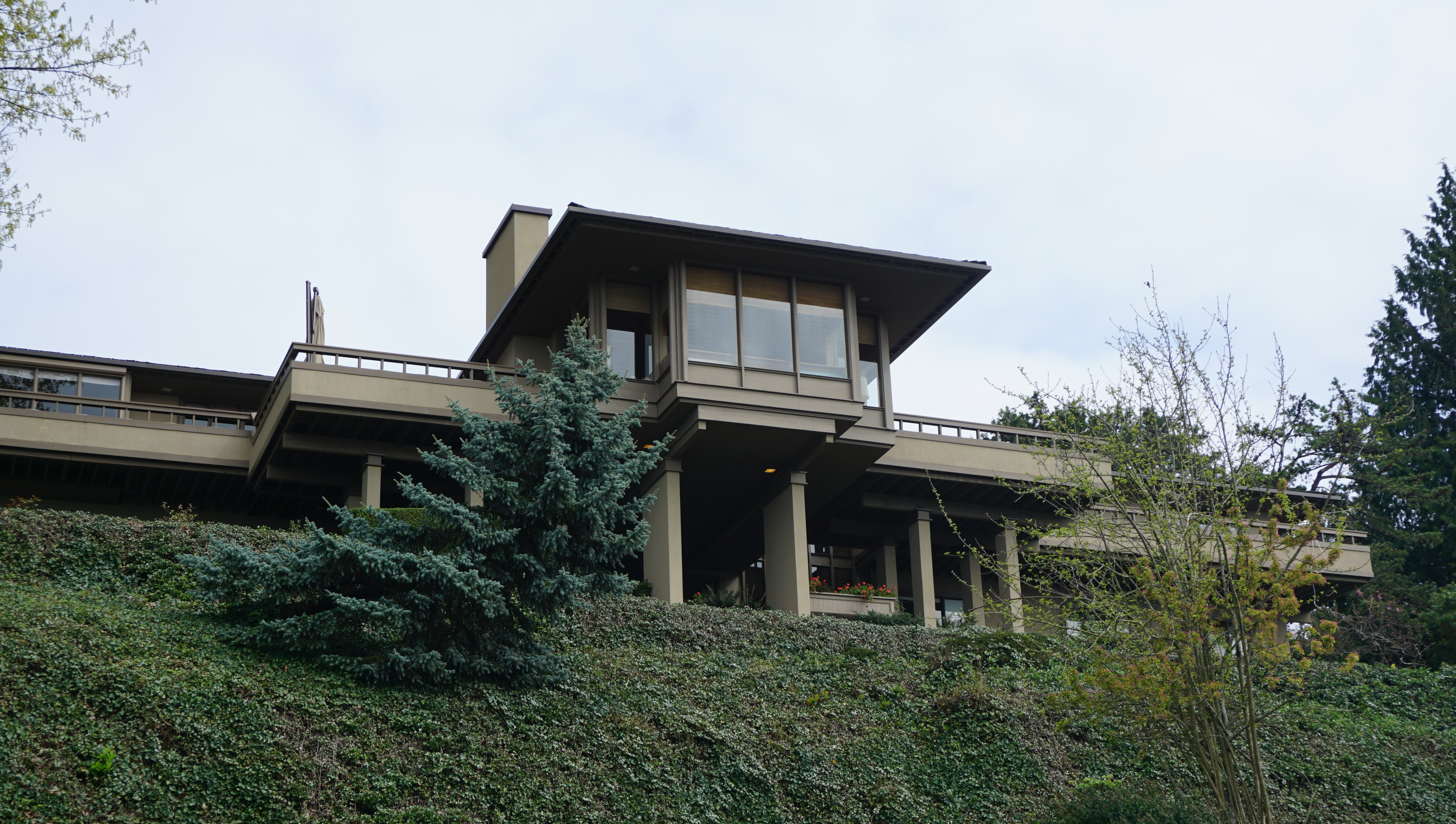
Broback Residence in Medina, Washington, 1964

North Capitol Hill homes (South), 1996

- Dr. Tucker House (1957)
- Jans House (1959)
- McNair House (1961)
- Several buildings at the University of Washington: Friday Harbor Laboratories (1962–1967), San Juan Island
- Miller House (c. 1963)
- Broback Residence (1964, Medina, Washington)
- Waddington House (1964, Mercer Island)
- Ambaum Medical & Dental Clinic (1965, Seattle)
- Strom House (1965)
- Fisheries Center Addition at the University of Washington (1968, Seattle)
- Grey Gull Hotel (1969, Ocean Shores, Washington)
- Pifer House (1970, Queen Anne Hill)
- Williams House (1970, Evergreen Point, Medina, Washington)
- Three Tree Point House (1971, Burien, Washington)
- Runions House (1967)
- Bellefield Office Park (1972, Bellevue)
- Lamphere House (1973, West Seattle)
- Middleton, Berner & Wood Medical Building (1974, Bellevue)
- Seattle Trust Court (1977, Seattle)
- Marketplace North (1981, Belltown / Pike-Market, Seattle; with Bumgardner Partnership)
- North Capitol Hill Homes (North & South) (1996, Brace Point Partnership)
