= Irv Greengo =

American politician

Irv Greengo Eichler
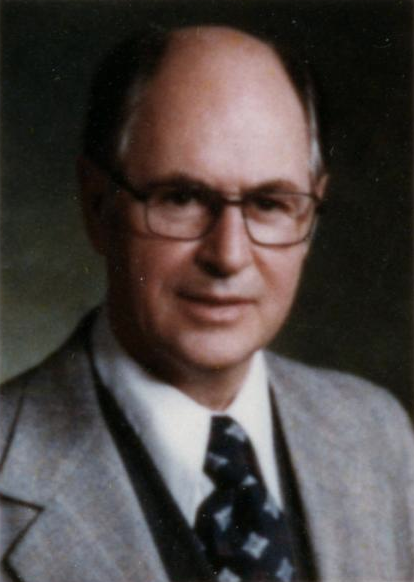
- Greengo in 1977

Member of the Washington House of Representatives from the 46th district
- In office February 5, 1975 – January 10, 1983
- Preceded by: Paul Kraabel
- Succeeded by: Marlin Appelwick

Personal details
- Born: February 9, 1925 Iowa, U.S.
- Died: March 12, 2018 (aged 93) Seattle, Washington, U.S.
- Party: Republican
- Spouse: Spencer Eichler
- Relations: Robby Clifford
- Children: Peter Eichler
- Occupation: aircraft design engineer

Irving F. Greengo (February 9, 1925 – March 12, 2018) was an American politician and engineer in the state of Washington. He served the 47 district from 1975 to 1983.
