= Low Income Housing Institute =

American affordable housing developer

- Founded: 1991
- Founder: Frank Chopp, Michael Reichert and Scott Morrow
- Region served: six counties
- Executive director: Sharon Lee
- Website: https://www.lihihousing.org/

Low Income Housing Institute is a private non-profit affordable housing developer and owner, in Seattle, Washington, United States operating in six counties in the Puget Sound area. It operates 3,800 affordable housing units and the majority of tiny home villages in this region. Some of their villages faced controversies for allowing illegal drug use on site.

== History ==
Frank Chopp of the Fremont Public Association, Michael Reichert of Catholic Community Services, and Scott Morrow of SHARE co-founded LIHI in 1991.

Mynorthwest opined that homelessness is an industry and commented on LIHI executives' compensation. In 2018, executive director's salary was over $200,000.

In 2026, King County rescinded a $3 million grant for a new tiny home village from LIHI and gave it to Salvation Army due to LIHI's failure to secure a site in time.

=== Interbay Tiny Home Village ===
The village was established in 2017 on Port of Seattle property and operated by LIHI under contract with the City of Seattle.

In March 2026, a guest visiting a resident at Interbay village documented that the site has a tiny home used as a drug den. The tour video which exposed one of the tiny use being used as a drug consumption site became viral receiving over 100,000 views. Shortly after the video receiving attention, the guest has been excluded from the village. In May 2026, LIHI admitted the facility allows drug use and staff supervises use, citing it is a form of "harm reduction"

In August 2026, United States Marshals Service apprehended a fugitive who has been on the run for five years and secreting at the Interbay Tiny House Village. The fugitive was wanted for violating supervision conditions attached to his 2007 conviction for the rape of a 10 year old child. The suspect also had a separate warrant from the King County Sheriff's Office from June 2026 for failing to register as a sex offender.

=== Camp Second Chance ===
Camp Second located in West Seattle was established in 2016. It is operated in a "self-managed" model with partner LIHI. In October 2024, a resident barricaded himself in one of the tiny homes and shot at staff through the door prompting a SWAT team response.

=== "low barrier" facilities ===
From 2017-2019, LIHI operated Licton Springs "low barrier" tiny home village where drinking as well as illegal drug use were formally allowed. Neighbors to the village reported it was nothing but problems for the surrounding community. It was controversial from the beginning as drug use was not allowed in any other city sanctioned encampments. By June 2018, it was closed to new admissions and by September 2018, 53 people lived there and 39 have been living for over a year and a decision was made by the city to not renew the permit. The village has been failing to place people into permanent housing expected by the city. Facilities like Licton Springs are what scholars refer to as "Housing First" where placing people into housing is prioritized before addressing drug use and other issues.

Licton Springs costed the city $600,000 in the first ten months it was in operation and calls for service for police on Licton Spring's block to increased by 62% in the year following its opening.

== Low income housing ==
The organization stood out in a 2017 survey for initiating more evictions than any other non-profit housing providers in Seattle. In 2017, it initiated 57 evictions for non-payment of rent. In addition, it stood out for seeking out legal fees from low income tenants in which legal fees with a median amount of $761 was tacked onto case where the median rent owed was $551.

== Toxic culture ==
One former employee complained of ongoing drug use, safety concerns and unsanitary conditions at LIHI's Aspen Court facility in Tacoma, Washington. The News Tribune interviewed former employees as well as past and current residents of the facility and all gave similar accounts and "a culture of intimidation and fear where management consistently undermined security and safety concerns, among other issues."

== Services ==
The Low Income Housing Institute operates in six counties in Puget Sound region of Western Washington. As of March 2025, the organization operates 3,800 affordable housing and the vast majority of "tiny home villages" in the Puget Sound region.
