= Clyde Ballard =

American businessman and politician from Washington

45th Speaker of the Washington House of Representatives
- In office January 9, 1995 – January 14, 2002 Serving with Frank Chopp (1999–2002)
- Preceded by: Brian Ebersole
- Succeeded by: Frank Chopp

Minority Leader of the Washington House of Representatives
- In office January 14, 2002 – January 13, 2003
- Preceded by: Frank Chopp
- Succeeded by: Cathy McMorris Rodgers
- In office January 12, 1987 – January 9, 1995
- Preceded by: Sim Wilson
- Succeeded by: Brian Ebersole

Member of the Washington House of Representatives from the 12th district
- In office January 10, 1983 – January 13, 2003
- Preceded by: Roland Schmitten
- Succeeded by: Cary Condotta

Personal details
- Born: June 8, 1936 (age 90) Batesville, Arkansas, U.S.
- Party: Republican
- Spouse: Ruth Ballard
- Children: 3, and 2 stepchildren
- Occupation: Businessman, politician
- Known for: Founder of Ballard Ambulance

Clyde Ballard (born June 8, 1936) is an American businessman and former politician from Washington. Ballard is a former Republican member of the Washington House of Representatives, representing the 12th district from 1983 to 2003.

== Career ==
Ballard is a former general manager in a grocery store.

On August 1, 1967, Ballard and Ruth Ballard founded Ballard Ambulance in Washington.

On November 2, 1982, Ballard won the election and became a Republican member of the Washington House of Representatives for District 12, Position 1. Ballard defeated Howard D. Pryor and Henry (Fritz) Halla with 60.65% of the votes.

In 1986, Ballard sold Ballard Ambulance to his sons.

In leadership, he served as Republican Caucus-Chair from 1985 to 1986, as House Minority Leader from 1987 to 1995 and as Speaker of the House from 1995 to 1999. Between 1999 and 2002, no party in the Washington House of Representative held a majority. During this time, Ballard served as Co-Speaker of the House alongside Frank Chopp.

In 2003, Ballard retired as a member of Washington House of Representatives.

== Awards ==
- 2018 Washington State Apple Blossom Grand Marshal.

== Personal life ==
At age 18, Ballard married Ruth. They have three sons and two foster daughters. Ballard and his family live in East Wenatchee, Washington.

== Additional sources ==
- Who's who in the West 2004, ISBN 978-0-8379-0935-6
