= Solid Ground (Seattle) =

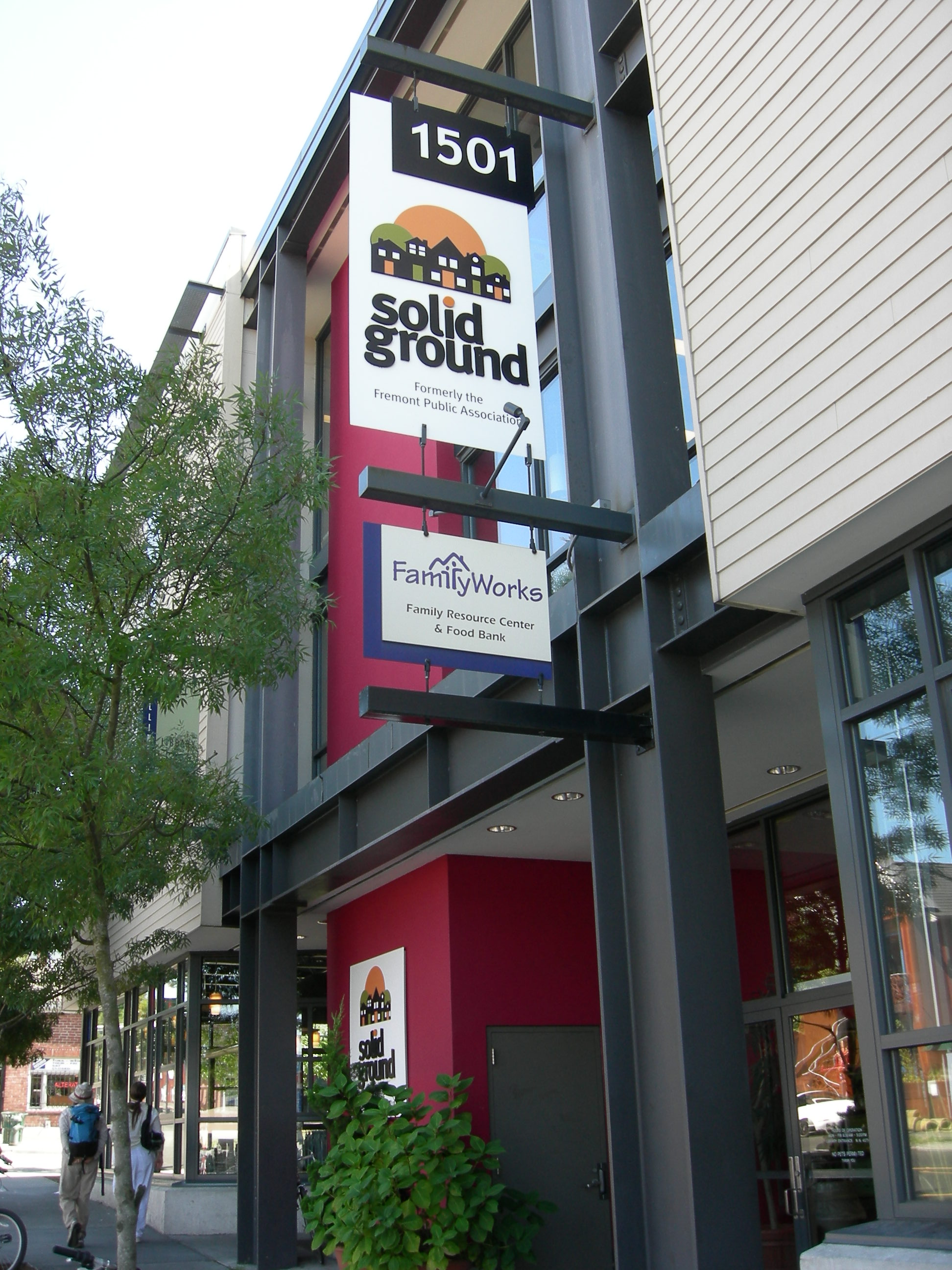
Solid Ground headquarters (2007)

Solid Ground (founded in 1974 as the Fremont Public Association) is an anti-poverty and social service organization in Seattle, Washington. Originating in Seattle's Fremont neighborhood and now based in the adjacent Wallingford neighborhood, the organization is active throughout Seattle, King County and (for some programs) statewide. The organization's services include adult education, after-school programs, food delivery for seniors, homelessness prevention, financial counseling, and legal referrals.

From 2008 to 2019, Solid Ground contracted directly with King County Metro to offer paratransit services as part of the Metro Access program. In 2019, MV Transportation took over the contracts to manage the dispatch center and bus drivers, with Solid Ground remaining involved as a subcontractor for MV Transportation. In October 2022, about 150 of Sound Ground's paratransit drivers, joined by supporters and members of the Amalgamated Transit Union Local 587, demonstrated for better wages from MV Transportation, saying they had not received money that was distributed as part of the American Rescue Plan Act of 2021, despite being frontline workers during the COVID-19 pandemic.

In February 2018, Solid Ground faced criticism for its management of a housing campus in the Sand Point neighborhood in North Seattle. Residents were critical of the organization's response to the killing of a resident named Charleena Lyles on June 18, 2017. Lyles was a pregnant Black woman and a mother of four who was shot and killed by police after she called them for help. Residents of the Sand Point campus asked for an independent review of Solid Ground's stewardship of the community, citing insufficient case management and services. In response, Solid Ground said they were taking several steps to "stabilize the campus", including: assigning more staff, creating a "community-led advisory committee" to liaise with residents, and adding access to mental and behavioral health services on the campus.

Operating on an annual budget of about US$32 million as of 2022, Solid Ground indicates US$32,366,517 budgeted income and $31,854,878 budgeted expenses. Major program areas fall under the headings Housing, Homelessness Prevention, Hunger & Food Resources, Domestic Violence Services, Legal Services, Advocacy, Anti-Racism Initiative, Retired & Senior Volunteer Services and Transportation Services.

Solid Ground programs include direct provision of services (support of Seattle food banks, housing programs, skills classes, legal aid to obtain or maintain state benefits, etc.), but they also focus on political organizing and systems change work, including lobbying the Washington state government. They also provide senior volunteers to over 80 King County human service organizations.
