= Globe Building, Beebe Building and Hotel Cecil =

Historic buildings in Seattle, Washington

- Globe Building & Beebe Building
- U.S. National Register of Historic Places
- Seattle Landmark
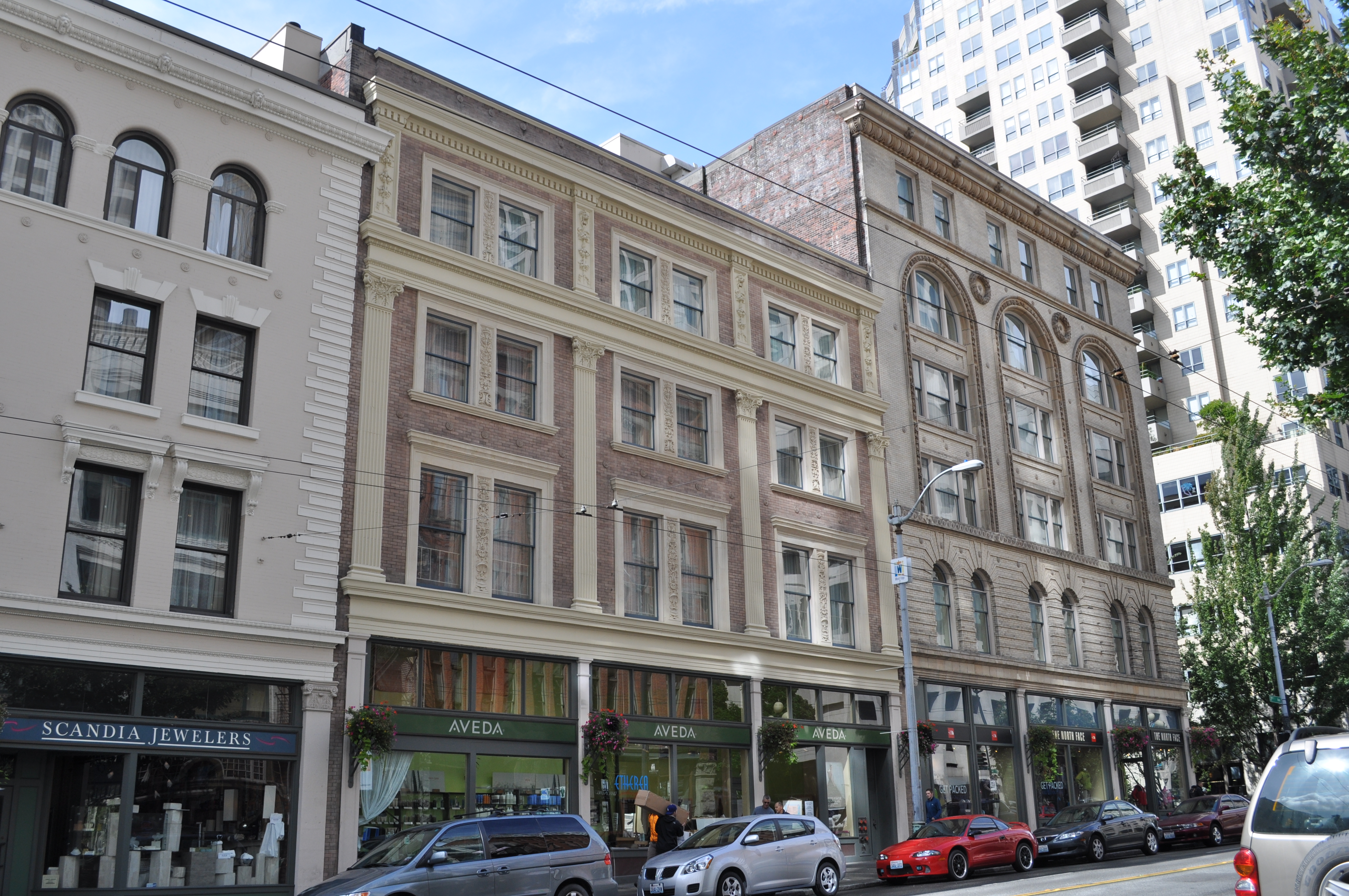

- Location within Downtown Seattle Location within Washington (state)
- Location: 1001–1031 1st Ave., Seattle, Washington
- Coordinates: 47°36′17.58″N 122°20′12.89″W
- Built: 1900–1901
- Architect: Umbrecht, Max
- Architectural style: Italian Renaissance Revival
- NRHP reference No.: 82004235

Significant dates
- Added to NRHP: April 29, 1982
- Designated SEATL: March 21, 1983

The Globe Building, Beebe Building and the Hotel Cecil are a trio of historic office/hotel buildings located in Downtown Seattle, Washington, United States. The buildings occupy the entire west side of the 1000 block of 1st Avenue between Madison and Spring streets. The three buildings were constructed from late 1900 to 1901 for Syracuse-based investors Clifford Beebe and William Nottingham by the Clise Investment Company, headed by businessman James Clise (1855–1938), as a result of the Alaska Gold Rush which fueled the construction of many such buildings in downtown Seattle.

All three buildings were designed in Italian Renaissance Style for Clise by Max Umbrecht (1872–1955), a mostly residential architect who came to Seattle around 1900 from Syracuse, New York where he had worked briefly in the firm of Jeffery & Umbrecht. The two Northern buildings, both known at times as the Beebe buildings were built by Clise for owner Clifford D. Beebe, also of Syracuse while the Globe Building was built by Clise for William Nottingham's Globe Navigation Company.

This group of buildings consist of the last contiguous block of 1900s buildings on 1st Avenue between the Pioneer Square district and the Pike Place Market. Following a major restoration in early 1982, the buildings were listed together on the National Register of Historic Places. In 1983, the buildings were collectively listed as Seattle City Landmarks under the title "First Avenue Groups/Waterfront Center".

Since September 10, 1982, the buildings have been operated as the Alexis Hotel, operated as of December 2020 by Sonesta Hotels.

== History ==
=== Site ===
Prior to the Great Seattle fire in 1889, the 1000 block of 1st Avenue, like most property on the west side of that street at the time, was mostly water, with several small buildings built on pilings. In 1884, the most substantial structure on the site was a two-story wood-frame building on the Northwest corner of 1st and Madison with an adjoining warehouse. Further up the block were several small stores and a single dwelling where Spring Street would later extend. Of note at the time was the existence of an inclined plane that ran up the north side of Madison Street to 1st. This ramp was to be used for rolling fire engines to collect water for fighting fires. By 1888 the block was filled with warehouses and small manufacturing businesses including a mattress factory. After the great fire, not much was built on the 1000 block and nothing more would be built as the Panic of 1893 took hold of the economy. 1893 Sanborn Maps show only the one-story brick building (filling the footprint of the Globe Building) with a double basement occupying the Northwest corner of 1st and Madison built by Jensen & Koch immediately after the fire. The Seattle Brass Foundry occupied a small brick building behind it. Seattle was brought out of the depression with the discovery of gold in the Yukon in 1897. The city soon became a major supply point for prospectors on their way to the gold fields which resulted in a large building boom.

=== Hotel Cecil and Beebe Building ===
The 6-story Hotel Cecil and 4-story Beebe Buildings were both built by the Clise Investment Co. for Syracuse, New York resident and capitalist Clifford D. Beebe, a member of the executive committee of the Seattle Lighting Company and a stockholder in several of Clise's interests. Construction began in late 1900 and was completed on both buildings by late 1901. The 6-story building cost $100,000 while the 4-story building, finished last, cost $65,000. The first tenants of the building's ground and second level (as well as its two sub-basements) was the prominent Z.C. Miles & Piper Company, a home furnishing store begun in Seattle in 1870.

From construction, the building's upper floors were interconnected to serve as a hotel, the first of several being the Hotel Waldorf. Soon after opening it was renamed the Hotel Cecil (after the Hotel Cecil in London). In November 1909, the building's owners hired Umbrecht, now in the firm of Spalding & Umbrecht, to completely remodel the two building's interiors.

Each floor of the building will be entirely remodeled, making the hotel a strictly modern one. An entirely new arrangement is planned for the office and lobby. New fixtures will be installed and the walls wainscoted with marble and frescoed and the front altered. – The Seattle Times

After operating sporadically for several years as the McFarland Hotel, it came under new management in 1921 and was reopened as the New Arlington Hotel, named after the Arlington Hotel located two blocks north owned by the same people. At the same time, a hotel named The New Cecil Hotel opened on Third Avenue. As the New Arlington Hotel, it catered to businessmen as well as transients and offered telephones and hot and cold running water in each of its 200 rooms, a luxury by the day's standards.

=== Globe Building ===
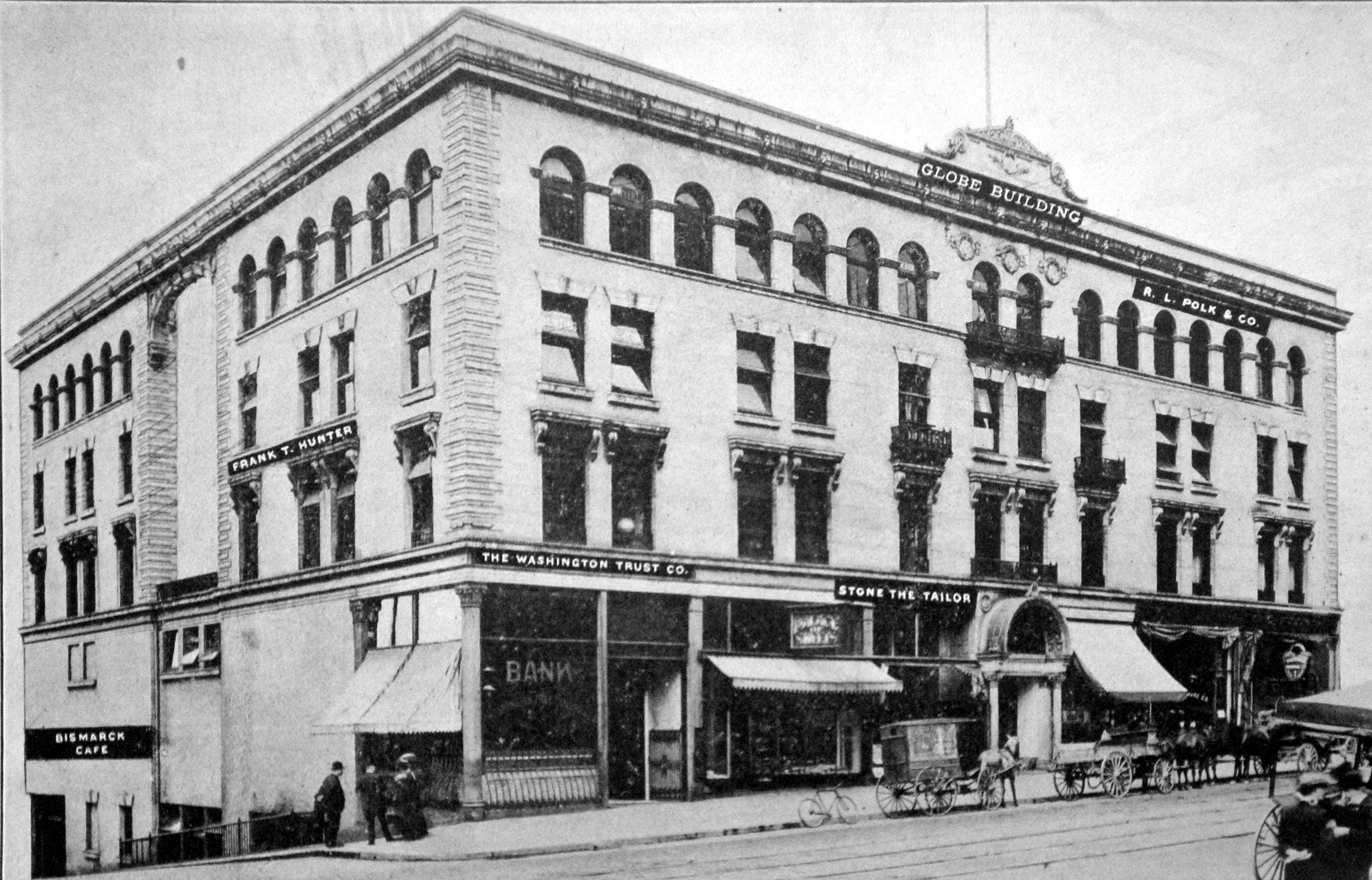
The Globe Building c. 1905

The Globe Building, or Globe Block as it was sometimes known, was constructed in 1901 by James Clise for Syracuse investor William Nottingham for Clise's newly formed shipbuilding operation, the Globe Navigation Company to which Nottingham held a large interest. Nottingham and Clise filed a permit for a four-story building at the Northwest corner of 1st Avenue and Madison Street in March 1901, replacing the single-story brick Jensen-Koch Building. The building's upper floors originally contained 38 offices each. Upon completion of the building in November 1901, Clise relocated his main offices there from the Pacific Block in Pioneer Square, soon to be followed by many other tenants from that building, reflecting the northward migration of Seattle's business core. Besides the offices of the Globe Navigation and Clise investment Companies, other early upstairs tenants included the Pacific Packing and Navigation Company, The Seattle News-Letter office, The New York Commercial Co. and the Centennial Mill Co. Architect Max Umbrecht moved his own offices into the building upon completion. He was soon joined in the building by up and coming architect John Graham, who would eventually rise to be one of Seattle's greatest 20th century architects. In the corner office of the first floor, Clise opened the Washington Trust Company, which would later merge with the Dexter Horton Bank which would become part of Seafirst Bank.

The Globe Building was the center of James Clise's business empire until 1917 when he built the much larger Securities Building uptown. Upon its completion, he moved all of his company's offices to the new building. Following his departure, the tenants of the building began to reflect the working-class population of the area. Pawn shops, restaurants and a public market occupied the lower floors at various times.

== See also ==
- National Register of Historic Places listings in King County, Washington#Seattle
- List of landmarks in Seattle
