= National Register of Historic Places listings in Seattle =

Location of Seattle in King County and Washington

This is a list of the National Register of Historic Places listings in Seattle, Washington.

This is intended to be a complete list of the properties and districts on the National Register of Historic Places in the city of Seattle, Washington, United States. Latitude and longitude coordinates are provided for many National Register properties and districts; these locations may be seen together in an online map.

Of the 321 properties and districts listed on the National Register in King County, 228 are located in Seattle; these are listed below, while the remaining properties and districts are listed elsewhere. Four properties were once listed on the National Register in Seattle but have been removed.

This National Park Service list is complete through NPS recent listings posted September 25, 2026.

== Current listings ==
	Name on the Register	Image	Date listed	Location	Description
1	12th Avenue South Bridge	12th Avenue South Bridge	July 16, 1982 (#82004227)	12th Ave., S. over Dearborn St. 47°35′46″N 122°18′58″W	Built in 1911, it is the state's oldest surviving steel arch bridge. Renamed the Jose Rizal Bridge in 1974, the bridge spans Dearborn Street, connecting Beacon Hill and the International District. Also part of the Historic Bridges and Tunnels in Washington Thematic Resource listing
2	1411 Fourth Avenue Building	1411 Fourth Avenue Building	May 28, 1991 (#91000633)	1411 Fourth Ave. 47°36′34″N 122°20′06″W	
3	14th Avenue South Bridge	14th Avenue South Bridge	July 16, 1982 (#82004228)	Spanned Duwamish River; 47°34′13″N 122°21′02″W	Now demolished. Also known as the South Park Bridge, this Scherzer Rolling Lift double-leaf bascule bridge was the only bridge of its type in the state. It opened in 1931 and spanned the Duwamish River, connecting the South Park neighborhood with the rest of Seattle. It was demolished in 2010 due to safety concerns. Also part of the Historic Bridges and Tunnels in Washington Thematic Resource listing
4	1600 East John Street Apartments	1600 East John Street Apartments	May 14, 2013 (#13000278)	1600 E. John St. 47°37′12″N 122°18′40″W	
5	1926 Model Brick Home	1926 Model Brick Home	December 6, 2016 (#16000829)	2600 E. Montlake Pl. 47°38′36″N 122°18′11″W	
6	Admiral Theater	Admiral Theater	December 11, 1989 (#89002098)	2343 California Avenue SW; 47°34′58″N 122°23′11″W	
7	Admiral's House, 13th Naval District	Admiral's House, 13th Naval District	February 13, 2013 (#13000016)	2001 W. Garfield St. 47°37′56″N 122°23′19″W	
8	Agen Warehouse	Agen Warehouse	January 23, 1998 (#97001673)	1201 Western Ave. 47°36′21″N 122°20′15″W	
9	Alaska Trade Building	Alaska Trade Building	May 6, 1971 (#71000871)	1915-1919 1st Ave. 47°36′39″N 122°20′28″W	
10	John B. Allen School	John B. Allen School	May 11, 2011 (#11000280)	6532 Phinney Ave. N. 47°40′38″N 122°21′14″W	
11	Arboretum Sewer Trestle	Arboretum Sewer Trestle	July 16, 1982 (#82004229)	Crosses 26th Ave., E. between Roanoke and E. Miller St. 47°38′33″N 122°17′52″W	Built in 1910, this sewer viaduct is an early example of a reinforced concrete arch bridge. Ornamental in design, today it serves as a pedestrian bridge over Lake Washington Boulevard in the Washington Park Arboretum. Also part of the Historic Bridges and Tunnels in Washington Thematic Resource listing
12	Arctic Building	Arctic Building	November 28, 1978 (#78002749)	306 Cherry St. 47°36′14″N 122°19′50″W	
13	Alfredo & Susan Lytle Arreguin House and Studio	Alfredo & Susan Lytle Arreguin House and Studio	May 9, 2022 (#100007697)	2412 NE 80th St. 47°41′12″N 122°18′05″W	
14	Assay Office/German House	Assay Office/German House	March 16, 1972 (#72001271)	613 9th Ave. 47°36′22″N 122°19′25″W	
15	Aurora Avenue Bridge	Aurora Avenue Bridge	July 16, 1982 (#82004230)	Aurora Ave., N. over Lake Washington Ship Canal; 47°39′10″N 122°20′46″W	Built in 1931, this cantilever truss bridge carries traffic on State Route 99 (Aurora Avenue) over the west end of Lake Union, connecting the neighborhoods of Queen Anne and Fremont. Also part of the Historic Bridges and Tunnels in Washington Thematic Resource listing
16	Ballard Avenue Historic District	Ballard Avenue Historic District	July 1, 1976 (#76001885)	Ballard Ave. from NW Market to NW Dock Sts. 47°39′59″N 122°22′55″W	
17	Ballard Bridge	Ballard Bridge	July 16, 1982 (#82004231)	Spans Lake Washington Ship Canal; 47°39′47″N 122°22′30″W	Built in 1917, the Ballard Bridge is one of the oldest examples in the state of a double-leaf bascule bridge. It spans Salmon Bay in the Lake Washington Ship Canal, connecting the neighborhood of Ballard with Queen Anne and Magnolia. Also part of the Historic Bridges and Tunnels in Washington Thematic Resource listing
18	Ballard Carnegie Library	Ballard Carnegie Library	June 15, 1979 (#79002535)	2026 N. West Market St. 47°40′08″N 122°22′54″W	part of the Carnegie Libraries of Washington TR (AD)
19	Ballard-Howe House	Ballard-Howe House	March 26, 1979 (#79002536)	22 W. Highland Dr. 47°37′48″N 122°21′23″W	
20	Ballast Island	Ballast Island	January 27, 2021 (#100006067)	At the foot of South Washington and South Main Sts., along the waterfront 47°36′02″N 122°20′11″W	
21	Richard A. Ballinger House	Richard A. Ballinger House	May 28, 1976 (#76001886)	1733 39th Ave. 47°37′04″N 122°16′56″W	
22	Julian and Marajane Barksdale House	Julian and Marajane Barksdale House	December 24, 2013 (#13000995)	13226 42nd Ave. NE; 47°43′26″N 122°16′50″W	
23	Barnes Building	Barnes Building	February 24, 1975 (#75001853)	2320-2322 1st Ave. 47°36′49″N 122°20′42″W	
24	Bay View Brewery	Bay View Brewery	January 23, 2013 (#12001221)	3100–3222 Airport Way S. 47°34′34″N 122°19′15″W	
25	Beacon Hill School	Beacon Hill School	August 14, 2019 (#100004297)	2524 16th Ave. S 47°34′50″N 122°18′44″W	
26	Bell Apartments	Bell Apartments	July 12, 1974 (#74001957)	2326 1st Ave. 47°36′51″N 122°20′44″W	
27	William and Minna Bloch House		December 29, 2025 (#100012443)	1439 E Prospect St; 47°37′42″N 122°18′46″W	
28	Jesse C. Bowles House	Jesse C. Bowles House	November 6, 1986 (#86003162)	2540 Shoreland Dr. S 47°34′51″N 122°17′02″W	
29	Building No. 105, Boeing Airplane Company	Building No. 105, Boeing Airplane Company	August 26, 1971 (#71000872)	Purcell Ave. 47°31′06″N 122°17′42″W	Preserved as a part of the Museum of Flight.
30	Bon Marche Department Store	Bon Marche Department Store	December 6, 2016 (#16000830)	300 Pine St. 47°36′40″N 122°20′18″W	Now Macy's; the former flagship store of The Bon Marché.
31	Butterworth Building	Butterworth Building	May 14, 1971 (#71000873)	1921 1st Ave. 47°36′39″N 122°20′28″W	
32	Calhoun Hotel	Calhoun Hotel	April 23, 2013 (#13000208)	2000 2nd Ave. 47°36′43″N 122°20′30″W	
33	Cambridge Apartments	Cambridge Apartments	April 5, 2016 (#16000148)	903 Union St. 47°36′42″N 122°19′48″W	
34	Camlin Hotel	Camlin Hotel	March 25, 1999 (#99000405)	1619 Ninth St. 47°36′39″N 122°19′55″W	
35	Century 21-Washington State Coliseum	Century 21-Washington State Coliseum	May 10, 2018 (#100002406)	305 Harrison St. 47°37′20″N 122°21′15″W	Now Climate Pledge Arena.
36	Chelsea Family Hotel	Chelsea Family Hotel	December 14, 1978 (#78002750)	620 W. Olympic Pl. 47°37′41″N 122°21′53″W	
37	James and Pat Chiarelli House	James and Pat Chiarelli House	May 14, 2013 (#13000279)	843 NE 100th St. 47°42′04″N 122°19′07″W	
38	Chief Sealth High School	Chief Sealth High School	September 14, 2022 (#100008187)	2600 SW Thistle St. 47°31′47″N 122°22′02″W	
39	Chinese Baptist Church	Chinese Baptist Church	July 31, 1986 (#86002094)	925 S. King St. 47°35′54″N 122°19′07″W	
40	Chittenden Locks and Lake Washington Ship Canal	Chittenden Locks and Lake Washington Ship Canal	December 14, 1978 (#78002751)	Salmon Bay; 47°39′19″N 122°21′07″W	Chittenden Locks and Lake Washington Ship Canal
41	Church of the Blessed Sacrament, Priory, and School	Church of the Blessed Sacrament, Priory, and School	January 12, 1984 (#84003479)	5040-5041 9th Ave., NE; 47°40′00″N 122°19′03″W	
42	Cobb Building	Cobb Building	August 3, 1984 (#84003485)	1301-1309 4th Ave. 47°37′04″N 122°20′02″W	
43	Coliseum Theater	Coliseum Theater	July 7, 1975 (#75001854)	5th Ave. and Pike St. 47°36′41″N 122°20′02″W	
44	Colman Automotive Building	Colman Automotive Building	February 13, 2013 (#13000017)	401 E. Pine St. 47°36′54″N 122°19′36″W	
45	Colman Building	Colman Building	March 16, 1972 (#72001272)	811 1st Ave. 47°36′14″N 122°20′03″W	
46	Colman Park & Dose Terrace Stairs	Colman Park & Dose Terrace Stairs	February 10, 2020 (#100004959)	Roughly bounded by South Massachusetts St., South Dose Terrace, 31st Ave. South, & the Lake Washington shoreline 47°35′01″N 122°17′18″W	
47	Colonial Hotel	Colonial Hotel	April 29, 1982 (#82004232)	1119-1123 1st Ave. 47°36′22″N 122°20′11″W	
48	Colonnade Hotel	Colonnade Hotel	August 7, 2017 (#100001443)	107 Pine St. 47°36′35″N 122°20′26″W	
49	Columbia City Historic District	Columbia City Historic District	September 8, 1980 (#80004000)	Roughly bounded by S. Hudson and S. Alaska Sts., 35th and Rainier Aves. 47°33′33″N 122°17′08″W	
50	Continental Hotel	Continental Hotel	July 8, 2024 (#100010525)	315 Seneca Street; 47°36′26″N 122°20′05″W	
51	Frank B. Cooper Elementary School	Frank B. Cooper Elementary School	March 26, 2003 (#03000161)	4408 Delridge Way SW; 47°33′49″N 122°21′41″W	
52	Cornish School	Cornish School	August 29, 1977 (#77001337)	710 E. Roy St. 47°37′32″N 122°19′19″W	
53	Cowen Park Bridge	Cowen Park Bridge	July 16, 1982 (#82004233)	15th Ave., N. 47°40′16″N 122°18′45″W	In 1936, the Works Progress Administration constructed this open-spandrel reinforced concrete arch bridge. The bridge, notable for its Art Deco motifs, is part of 15th Ave NE, spanning the eastern edge of the ravine in Cowen Park. Also part of the Historic Bridges and Tunnels in Washington Thematic Resource listing
54	Daughters of the American Revolution-Rainier Chapter House	Daughters of the American Revolution-Rainier Chapter House	March 20, 2019 (#100003525)	800 East Roy St. 47°37′30″N 122°19′20″W	
55	De La Mar Apartments	De La Mar Apartments	August 18, 1980 (#80004001)	115 W. Olympic Pl. 47°37′36″N 122°21′28″W	
56	Henry H. Dearborn House	Henry H. Dearborn House	January 23, 1998 (#97001672)	1117 Minor Ave. 47°36′40″N 122°19′27″W	
57	Charles P. and Ida Dose House	Charles P. and Ida Dose House	December 24, 2013 (#13000996)	2121 31st Ave., S 47°35′02″N 122°17′36″W	
58	Dunn Gardens	Dunn Gardens	December 15, 1994 (#94001435)	13533 Northshire Rd. NW. 47°43′39″N 122°21′50″W	
59	Duwamish (fireboat)	Duwamish (fireboat)	June 30, 1989 (#89001448)	Historic Ships Wharf; 47°37′41″N 122°20′11″W	
60	Duwamish Number 1 Site	Duwamish Number 1 Site	October 18, 1977 (#77001338)	Address Restricted	
61	Eagles Auditorium Building	Eagles Auditorium Building	July 14, 1983 (#83003338)	1416 7th Ave. 47°36′40″N 122°19′51″W	
62	El Rio Apartment Hotel	El Rio Apartment Hotel	November 30, 1999 (#99001453)	1922-1928 9th Ave. 47°36′59″N 122°20′01″W	
63	Ellsworth Storey Cottages Historic District	Ellsworth Storey Cottages Historic District	July 6, 1976 (#76001891)	1706-1816 S. Lake Washington Blvd. and 1725-1729 S. 36th Ave. 47°35′15″N 122°17′17″W	
64	Ellsworth Storey Residences	Ellsworth Storey Residences	April 14, 1972 (#72001276)	260, 270 E. Dorffel Dr. 47°37′18″N 122°17′07″W	
65	Jim and Betty Eng House	Jim and Betty Eng House	September 30, 2019 (#100004460)	8310 Beacon Ave. S. 47°31′45″N 122°17′16″W	
66	Suen King and Sue Fong Eng House		June 22, 2026 (#100013175)	611 8th Avenue South; 47°35′50″N 122°19′21″W	
67	Federal Office Building	Federal Office Building	April 30, 1979 (#79003155)	909 1st Ave. 47°36′16″N 122°20′06″W	The old Federal Office Building, built 1933
68	Federal Office Building	Federal Office Building	October 17, 2024 (#100010918)	915 2nd Ave. 47°36′16″N 122°20′07″W	The Henry M. Jackson Federal Building, built 1975-76
69	Federal Reserve Bank of San Francisco, Seattle Branch	Federal Reserve Bank of San Francisco, Seattle Branch	February 4, 2013 (#11000985)	1015 2nd Avenue; 47°36′19″N 122°20′09″W	
70	Pierre P. Ferry House	Pierre P. Ferry House	April 18, 1979 (#79002537)	1531 10th Ave., E. 47°38′03″N 122°19′08″W	
71	Fir Lodge	Fir Lodge	January 22, 2021 (#100006070)	2717 61st Ave. SW; 47°34′43″N 122°24′41″W	
72	Fire Station No. 18	Fire Station No. 18	June 19, 1973 (#73001876)	5427 Russell Ave., NW; 47°40′07″N 122°22′54″W	
73	Fire Station No. 23	Fire Station No. 23	September 10, 1971 (#71000874)	18th Ave. and Columbia St. 47°36′32″N 122°18′26″W	
74	Fire Station No. 25	Fire Station No. 25	April 14, 1972 (#72001273)	1400 Harvard Ave. 47°36′49″N 122°19′15″W	
75	First Methodist Episcopal Church	First Methodist Episcopal Church	January 3, 2011 (#10001105)	801 Fifth Ave. 47°36′20″N 122°19′53″W	
76	First Methodist Protestant Church of Seattle	First Methodist Protestant Church of Seattle	May 14, 1993 (#93000364)	128 16th Ave. E. 47°37′11″N 122°18′37″W	
77	Ford Motor Company Assembly Plant	Ford Motor Company Assembly Plant	October 9, 2013 (#13000823)	4735 E. Marginal Way; 47°33′29″N 122°20′25″W	
78	Fort Lawton	Fort Lawton	August 15, 1978 (#78002752)	On Magnolia Bluff; 47°39′33″N 122°24′49″W	
79	Fourth Church of Christ, Scientist	Fourth Church of Christ, Scientist	January 2, 2013 (#12001138)	1119 8th Ave. 47°36′33″N 122°19′48″W	
80	Freeway Park	Freeway Park	December 19, 2019 (#100004789)	700 Seneca St. 47°36′35″N 122°19′52″W	
81	Fremont Bridge	Fremont Bridge	July 16, 1982 (#82004234)	Spans Lake Washington Ship Canal; 47°38′52″N 122°20′55″W	part of the Historic Bridges and Tunnels in Washington TR
82	Fremont Building	Fremont Building	November 12, 1992 (#92001587)	3419 Fremont Ave. N. 47°39′01″N 122°20′58″W	
83	Frink Park	Frink Park	November 20, 2019 (#100004646)	Roughly bounded by 31st Ave. S., Lake Washington Blvd. & 34th Ave., S. King St. & S. Main St. 47°35′57″N 122°17′27″W	
84	Caroline Kline Galland House	Caroline Kline Galland House	February 8, 1980 (#80004002)	1605 17th Ave. 47°36′57″N 122°18′34″W	
85	Gas Works Park	Gas Works Park	January 2, 2013 (#02000862)	2000 N. Northlake Way; 47°38′46″N 122°20′06″W	Added January 2013, more than a decade after it was nominated.
86	Georgetown Steam Plant	Georgetown Steam Plant	1978 (#78002755)	Off WA 99 at King County Airport; 47°32′35″N 122°18′54″W	
87	Globe Building, Beebe Building and Hotel Cecil	Globe Building, Beebe Building and Hotel Cecil	April 29, 1982 (#82004235)	1001-1023 1st Ave. 47°36′19″N 122°20′08″W	
88	J. S. Graham Store	J. S. Graham Store	December 7, 1989 (#89002094)	119 Pine St. 47°36′36″N 122°20′19″W	
89	Grand Pacific Hotel	Grand Pacific Hotel	May 13, 1982 (#82004236)	1115-1117 1st Ave. 47°36′21″N 122°20′10″W	Originally known as the Starr Block
90	Guiry and Schillestad Building	Guiry and Schillestad Building	August 28, 1985 (#85001941)	2101-2111 1st Ave. 47°36′44″N 122°20′35″W	
91	Harvard-Belmont District	Harvard-Belmont District	May 13, 1982 (#82004237)	Bellevue Pl., Broadway, Boylston and Harvard Aves. 47°37′43″N 122°19′19″W	
92	Hawthorne Square	Hawthorne Square	August 14, 2012 (#08001301)	4800 Fremont Ave. N. 47°39′50″N 122°20′57″W	Seattle Apartment Buildings, 1900-1957 Multiple Property Submission (MPS)
93	Highland Apartments	Highland Apartments	December 7, 2018 (#100003254)	931 11th Ave. E 47°37′40″N 122°19′05″W	
94	Samuel Hill House	Samuel Hill House	May 3, 1976 (#76001887)	814 E. Highland Dr. 47°37′51″N 122°19′14″W	
95	Hoge Building	Hoge Building	April 14, 1983 (#83003339)	705 2nd Ave. 47°36′12″N 122°19′56″W	
96	Holyoke Building	Holyoke Building	June 3, 1976 (#76001888)	1018-1022 1st Ave. 47°36′20″N 122°20′05″W	
97	Home of the Good Shepherd	Home of the Good Shepherd	May 23, 1978 (#78002753)	Sunnyside, N. and 50th St. 47°39′51″N 122°19′51″W	
98	Hotel Sorrento	Hotel Sorrento	September 20, 2021 (#100006936)	900 Madison St. 47°36′31″N 122°19′36″W	
99	Hull Building	Hull Building	January 27, 1983 (#83003340)	2401-2405 1st Ave. 47°36′51″N 122°20′49″W	
100	Samuel Hyde House	Samuel Hyde House	April 12, 1982 (#82004238)	3726 E. Madison St. 47°37′55″N 122°17′01″W	
101	Immanuel Lutheran Church	Immanuel Lutheran Church	February 25, 1982 (#82004239)	1215 Thomas St. 47°37′15″N 122°19′51″W	
102	Interlake Public School	Interlake Public School	July 14, 1983 (#83003341)	4416 Wallingford Ave., N. 47°39′40″N 122°20′05″W	
103	Iron Pergola	Iron Pergola	August 26, 1971 (#71000875)	1st Ave. and Yesler Way; 47°36′07″N 122°19′58″W	
104	John N. Cobb (fisheries research vessel)	John N. Cobb (fisheries research vessel)	February 11, 2009 (#09000047)	7600 Sand Point Way NE. 47°41′16″N 122°15′34″W	
105	King Street Station	King Street Station	April 13, 1973 (#73001877)	3rd St., S. and S. King St. 47°35′56″N 122°19′46″W	
106	Knights of Columbus Hall - Council No. 676	Knights of Columbus Hall - Council No. 676	September 30, 2019 (#100004459)	722 E. Union St. 47°36′47″N 122°19′21″W	
107	Joseph Kraus House	Joseph Kraus House	February 25, 1982 (#82004240)	2812 Mt. Saint Helens Pl. 47°34′41″N 122°17′06″W	
108	Lake Washington Boulevard	Lake Washington Boulevard	May 8, 2017 (#100000989)	Connecting Montlake Boulevard to Seward Park through the Washington Park Arboretum; 47°36′34″N 122°16′59″W	
109	Leamington Hotel and Apartments	Leamington Hotel and Apartments	May 13, 1994 (#94000419)	317 Marion St. 47°36′19″N 122°19′52″W	
110	Eliza Ferry Leary House	Eliza Ferry Leary House	April 14, 1972 (#72001274)	1551 10th Ave., E. 47°38′02″N 122°19′08″W	
111	Hannah Lewis House	Hannah Lewis House	April 27, 2018 (#100002392)	2317 13th Avenue East; 47°38′24″N 122°18′58″W	
112	Liggett Building	Liggett Building	August 31, 2011 (#11000626)	1424 4th Ave. 47°36′36″N 122°20′10″W	
113	Lyon Building	Lyon Building	June 30, 1995 (#95000806)	607 Third Ave. 47°36′08″N 122°19′48″W	
114	MV Westward (wooden motor vessel)	MV Westward (wooden motor vessel)	April 12, 2007 (#07000304)	1010 Valley St. 47°37′38″N 122°19′18″W	
115	MV Vashon		April 29, 1982 (#82004241)	Pier 52; 47°36′09″N 122°20′50″W	Wrecked off of Prince of Wales Island (Alaska) in 1986.
116	Magnolia Public Library	Magnolia Public Library	May 11, 2006 (#15000453)	2801 34th Ave. W. 47°38′43″N 122°24′05″W	
117	George and Irene Matzen House	George and Irene Matzen House	August 26, 2019 (#100004329)	320 W Kinnear Place; 47°37′40″N 122°21′42″W	
118	Medical Dental Building	Medical Dental Building	May 11, 2006 (#06000371)	509 Olive Way; 47°36′53″N 122°20′13″W	
119	R. D. Merrill House	R. D. Merrill House	August 22, 1977 (#77001339)	919 Harvard Ave., E. 47°37′39″N 122°19′14″W	
120	Millionaire's Row Historic District	Millionaire's Row Historic District	January 28, 2021 (#100006062)	626-1021 14th Ave. East, 1409 East Aloha St., and 1409 East Prospect St. 47°37′37″N 122°18′53″W	
121	Montlake Bridge	Montlake Bridge	July 16, 1982 (#82004242)	Spans Lake Union Ship Canal; 47°38′51″N 122°18′13″W	part of the Historic Bridges and Tunnels in Washington TR
122	Montlake Historic District	Montlake Historic District	October 15, 2015 (#15000499)	Roughly bounded by Lake Washington Ship Canal, Interlaken Park, 15th Ave. E. & Washington Park Arboretum; 47°38′07″N 122°18′24″W	
123	Moore Theatre and Hotel	Moore Theatre and Hotel	August 30, 1974 (#74001958)	1932 2nd Ave. 47°36′43″N 122°20′23″W	
124	Mount Baker Park and Boulevard	Mount Baker Park and Boulevard	February 10, 2020 (#100004961)	Lake Park Dr. South & South Mount Baker Park Blvd. 47°34′52″N 122°17′17″W	
125	Mount Baker Park Historic District	Mount Baker Park Historic District	September 24, 2018 (#100002975)	Roughly bounded by 30th Ave. S, Lake Washington Blvd., 37th Ave. S, S College, S Court, S Hanford & S Byron Sts. 47°34′57″N 122°17′24″W	
126	Mount Baker Park Improvement Club Clubhouse	Mount Baker Park Improvement Club Clubhouse	December 13, 2016 (#16000855)	2811 Mount Rainier Dr., S. 47°34′40″N 122°17′15″W	
127	Mount Baker Ridge Tunnel	Mount Baker Ridge Tunnel	July 16, 1982 (#82004243)	East of WA 90; 47°35′25″N 122°17′14″W	part of the Historic Bridges and Tunnels in Washington TR
128	Mount Zion Baptist Church	Mount Zion Baptist Church	May 14, 2018 (#100002407)	1634 19th Ave. 47°36′59″N 122°18′27″W	
129	National Building	National Building	April 29, 1982 (#82004244)	1006-1024 Western Ave. 47°36′18″N 122°20′10″W	
130	Naval Air Station (NAS) Seattle	Naval Air Station (NAS) Seattle	July 2, 2010 (#09001218)	7400 Sand Point Way NE; 47°40′56″N 122°15′39″W	
131	Naval Military Hangar-University Shell House	Naval Military Hangar-University Shell House	July 1, 1975 (#75001856)	University of Washington campus 47°38′53″N 122°17′56″W	
132	Naval Reserve Armory	Naval Reserve Armory	July 8, 2009 (#09000506)	860 Terry Ave. N. 47°37′39″N 122°20′13″W	
133	New Richmond Hotel	New Richmond Hotel	July 12, 2011 (#11000426)	308 4th Ave. S. 47°35′59″N 122°19′43″W	Also known as the Downtowner Hotel and Addison on Fourth
134	New Washington Hotel	New Washington Hotel	September 28, 1989 (#89001607)	1902 Second Ave. 47°36′41″N 122°20′22″W	
135	Nihon Go Gakko	Nihon Go Gakko	June 23, 1982 (#82004245)	1414 S. Weller St. 47°35′53″N 122°18′38″W	
136	Nippon Kan	Nippon Kan	May 22, 1978 (#78002754)	622 S. Washington St. 47°36′05″N 122°19′26″W	
137	Northern Bank and Trust Building	Northern Bank and Trust Building	March 26, 2003 (#03000165)	1500 Fourth Ave. 47°36′38″N 122°20′06″W	
138	Northern Life Tower	Northern Life Tower	May 30, 1975 (#75001857)	1212 3rd Ave. 47°36′29″N 122°20′03″W	
139	Nuclear Reactor Building	Nuclear Reactor Building	July 24, 2009 (#08001158)	3785 Jefferson Rd. NE; 47°39′10″N 122°18′16″W	The Nuclear Reactor Building was demolished on July 19, 2016.
140	Old Georgetown City Hall	Old Georgetown City Hall	April 14, 1983 (#83003342)	6202 13th Ave., S. 47°32′52″N 122°18′53″W	
141	Old Public Safety Building	Old Public Safety Building	June 19, 1973 (#73001878)	4th Ave. and Terrace St. and 5th Ave. and Yesler Way; 47°36′08″N 122°19′36″W	
142	Olympic Hotel	Olympic Hotel	June 15, 1979 (#79002538)	1200-1220 4th Ave. 47°36′30″N 122°19′59″W	
143	A.L. Palmer Building	A.L. Palmer Building	January 23, 2008 (#07001457)	1000 1st. Ave. S. 47°35′39″N 122°20′02″W	
144	Panama Hotel	Panama Hotel	March 20, 2006 (#06000462)	605 South Main St. and 302 6th Ave. South; 47°36′00″N 122°19′34″W	
145	Paramount Theatre	Paramount Theatre	October 9, 1974 (#74001959)	901 Pine St. 47°36′49″N 122°19′48″W	
146	Park Department, Division of Playgrounds	Park Department, Division of Playgrounds	March 16, 1972 (#72001275)	301 Terry Ave. 47°36′15″N 122°19′14″W	
147	William Parsons House	William Parsons House	June 21, 1991 (#91000782)	2706 Harvard Ave. E. 47°38′42″N 122°19′14″W	
148	Phillips House	Phillips House	April 29, 1993 (#93000359)	711-713 E. Union St. 47°36′46″N 122°19′22″W	
149	Pike Place Public Market Historic District	Pike Place Public Market Historic District	March 13, 1970 (#70000644)	Bounded by Western Ave. to the west, Virginia St. to the north, 1st Ave. to the east, and the south wall of the Economy Market and Outlook Building to the south 47°36′37″N 122°20′25″W	
150	Pioneer Building, Pergola, and Totem Pole	Pioneer Building, Pergola, and Totem Pole	May 5, 1977 (#77001340)	5th Ave. and Yesler Way; 47°36′09″N 122°19′57″W	
151	Pioneer Hall	Pioneer Hall	June 5, 1970 (#70000645)	1642 43rd Ave., E. 47°38′05″N 122°16′34″W	
152	Pioneer Square-Skid Road District	Pioneer Square-Skid Road District	June 22, 1970 (#70000086)	Roughly bounded by the Viaduct, Railroad Ave. S., King St., 4th and 5th Aves., James and Columbia Sts. including the 500 block of 1st Ave. 47°36′03″N 122°19′56″W	Includes two increases to the size of the district.
153	Pirate (R-class sloop)	Pirate (R-class sloop)	August 15, 2000 (#00000968)	1010 Valley St. 47°37′37″N 122°20′09″W	
154	Queen Anne Club	Queen Anne Club	January 27, 1983 (#83003344)	1530 N. Queen Anne Ave. 47°38′01″N 122°21′20″W	
155	Queen Anne High School	Queen Anne High School	November 21, 1985 (#85002916)	201 Galer St. 47°37′54″N 122°21′03″W	
156	Queen Anne Post Office and Regional Headquarters	Queen Anne Post Office and Regional Headquarters	July 12, 2011 (#11000427)	415 1st Ave., N. 47°35′55″N 122°20′04″W	
157	Queen Anne Public School	Queen Anne Public School	July 30, 1975 (#75001858)	1401 5th Avenue West; 47°37′56″N 122°21′46″W	Converted to condos in 1984
158	Rainier Club	Rainier Club	April 22, 1976 (#76001889)	810 4th Ave. 47°36′22″N 122°19′51″W	
159	Ravenna-Cowen North Historic District	Ravenna-Cowen North Historic District	September 13, 2018 (#100002939)	Roughly bounded by 65th St., Ravenna Park, Ravenna Ravine & 12th Ave. 47°40′29″N 122°18′35″W	
160	Ravenna Park Bridge	Ravenna Park Bridge	July 16, 1982 (#82004246)	20th Ave., Spans Ravenna Park Ravine; 47°40′19″N 122°18′21″W	part of the Historic Bridges and Tunnels in Washington TR
161	Raymond-Ogden Mansion	Raymond-Ogden Mansion	June 15, 1979 (#79002539)	702 35th Ave. 47°36′30″N 122°17′13″W	
162	Rector Hotel	Rector Hotel	August 9, 2002 (#02000863)	619-621 Third Ave. 47°36′12″N 122°19′51″W	Now known as St. Charles Hotel building.
163	Redelsheimer-Ostrander House	Redelsheimer-Ostrander House	January 12, 1990 (#89002298)	200 40th Ave. E. 47°37′15″N 122°16′47″W	
164	Dr. José Rizal Park	Dr. José Rizal Park	May 19, 2025 (#100011849)	1007 12th Avenue South; 47°35′33″N 122°19′03″W	
165	Roanoke Park Historic District	Roanoke Park Historic District	July 30, 2009 (#09000578)	Bounded by Shelby St on the N, Roanoke St on the S, Harvard Ave on the W, 10th Ave on the E 47°38′42″N 122°19′15″W	
166	Judge James T. Ronald House	Judge James T. Ronald House	February 20, 1975 (#75001859)	421 30th St. 47°35′55″N 122°17′34″W	
167	SS San Mateo	SS San Mateo	April 7, 1971 (#71000876)	Seattle waterfront 47°35′55″N 122°30′44″W	
168	Schmitz Park Bridge	Schmitz Park Bridge	July 16, 1982 (#82004247)	Spans Schmitz Park Ravine; 47°34′38″N 122°24′08″W	part of the Historic Bridges and Tunnels in Washington TR
169	Schooner Martha	Schooner Martha	November 5, 2001 (#01001205)	1010 Valley St., Suite 100; 47°37′39″N 122°20′04″W	Martha Moved to Port Townsend; see http://www.schoonermartha.org/
170	Seattle Art Museum	Seattle Art Museum	July 20, 2016 (#16000474)	1400 E. Prospect St. 47°37′49″N 122°18′51″W	Now houses the Seattle Asian Art Museum.
171	Seattle Chinatown Historic District	Seattle Chinatown Historic District	November 6, 1986 (#86003153)	Roughly bounded by Main, Jackson, I-5, Waller, and Fifth; 47°35′56″N 122°19′25″W	
172	Seattle Public Library	Seattle Public Library	August 3, 1982 (#82004909)	4721 Rainier Ave. South; 47°33′36″N 122°17′09″W	part of the Carnegie Libraries of Washington TR
173	Seattle Public Library	Seattle Public Library	August 3, 1982 (#82004252)	731 N. 35th St. 47°39′04″N 122°20′49″W	part of the Carnegie Libraries of Washington TR
174	Seattle Public Library	Seattle Public Library	August 3, 1982 (#82004253)	7364 E. Green Lake Dr., N. 47°40′54″N 122°19′33″W	part of the Carnegie Libraries of Washington TR
175	Seattle Public Library	Seattle Public Library	August 3, 1982 (#82004250)	400 W. Garfield St. 47°38′02″N 122°21′41″W	part of the Carnegie Libraries of Washington TR
176	Seattle Public Library	Seattle Public Library	August 3, 1982 (#82004251)	5009 Roosevelt Way, NE; 47°39′55″N 122°18′59″W	part of the Carnegie Libraries of Washington TR
177	Seattle Public Library	Seattle Public Library	August 3, 1982 (#82004249)	2306 42nd Ave., SW; 47°34′58″N 122°23′01″W	part of the Carnegie Libraries of Washington TR
178	Seattle Yacht Club	Seattle Yacht Club	May 10, 2006 (#06000370)	1807 Hamlin St. 47°38′50″N 122°18′32″W	
179	Seattle, Chief of the Suquamish, Statue	Seattle, Chief of the Suquamish, Statue	April 19, 1984 (#84003502)	5th Ave., Denny Way, and Cedar St. 47°37′07″N 122°20′46″W	
180	Shafer Building	Shafer Building	December 13, 1995 (#95001445)	523 Pine St. 47°36′44″N 122°20′03″W	
181	Showboat Theatre	Showboat Theatre	April 25, 1986 (#86000970)	University of Washington, 1705 N.E. Pacific St. 47°38′58″N 122°18′38″W	Demolished April 1994.
182	Henry Owen Shuey House	Henry Owen Shuey House	December 5, 2002 (#02001487)	5218 16th Ave. NE; 47°40′03″N 122°18′33″W	
183	Sigma Kappa Mu Chapter House	Sigma Kappa Mu Chapter House	April 12, 2007 (#07000305)	4510 22nd Ave. NE; 47°39′42″N 122°18′16″W	
184	Skinner Building	Skinner Building	November 28, 1978 (#78002756)	1300-1334 5th Ave. 47°36′35″N 122°19′57″W	
185	Stimson-Green House	Stimson-Green House	May 4, 1976 (#76001890)	1204 Minor Ave. 47°36′43″N 122°19′26″W	
186	Stuart House and Gardens	Stuart House and Gardens	April 14, 1983 (#83003345)	619 W. Comstock St. 47°37′49″N 122°21′55″W	
187	Summit School	Summit School	October 4, 1979 (#79002540)	E. Union St. and Summit Ave. 47°36′49″N 122°19′28″W	
188	Supply Laundry Building	Supply Laundry Building	April 23, 2013 (#13000209)	1265 Republican St. 47°37′22″N 122°19′51″W	
189	Temple de Hirsch	Temple de Hirsch	January 5, 1984 (#84003506)	15th Ave. and E. Union St. 47°36′48″N 122°18′40″W	
190	Will H. Thompson House	Will H. Thompson House	November 29, 1979 (#79002541)	3119 S. Day St. 47°35′26″N 122°17′26″W	
191	Times Building	Times Building	January 27, 1983 (#83003346)	414 Olive Way; 47°36′47″N 122°20′12″W	
192	F/V Tordenskjold (West Coast Halibut Schooner)	F/V Tordenskjold (West Coast Halibut Schooner)	December 21, 2023 (#100009631)	860 Terry Avenue North (Lake Union Park Historic Ships Wharf); 47°37′40″N 122°20′10″W	
193	Triangle Hotel and Bar	Triangle Hotel and Bar	May 3, 1976 (#76001892)	551 1st Ave., S. 47°35′49″N 122°19′58″W	
194	Trinity Parish Church	Trinity Parish Church	September 26, 1991 (#91001440)	609 Eighth Ave. 47°36′19″N 122°19′31″W	
195	Turner-Koepf House	Turner-Koepf House	April 22, 1976 (#76001893)	2336 15th Ave., S. 47°35′01″N 122°18′43″W	
196	USCG-11 (united states coast guard patrol vessel)	USCG-11 (united states coast guard patrol vessel)	September 9, 2022 (#100008195)	1801 Fairview Ave. East; 47°38′09″N 122°19′39″W	
197	U.S. Courthouse	U.S. Courthouse	January 8, 1980 (#80004003)	1010 5th Ave. 47°36′26″N 122°19′48″W	
198	U.S. Immigrant Station and Assay Office	U.S. Immigrant Station and Assay Office	January 1, 1979 (#79002542)	815 Airport Way, S. 47°35′43″N 122°19′33″W	Now known as Inscape Arts.
199	U.S. Marine Hospital	U.S. Marine Hospital	December 21, 1979 (#79002543)	1131 14th Ave., S. 47°35′40″N 122°18′57″W	Now known as the Pacific Medical Center.
200	Union Stables	Union Stables	April 23, 2013 (#13000210)	2200 Western Ave. 47°36′44″N 122°20′46″W	
201	Union Station	Union Station	August 30, 1974 (#74001960)	4th, S. and S. Jackson Sts. 47°35′56″N 122°19′38″W	
202	United Shopping Tower	United Shopping Tower	August 18, 1980 (#80004004)	217 Pine St. 47°36′38″N 122°20′14″W	
203	U.S. Immigration Building	U.S. Immigration Building	September 14, 1987 (#87001524)	84 Union St. 47°36′28″N 122°20′20″W	
204	University Bridge	University Bridge	July 16, 1982 (#82004254)	Spans Lake Washington Ship Canal; 47°39′12″N 122°19′08″W	part of the Historic Bridges and Tunnels in Washington TR
205	University Heights School	University Heights School	December 7, 2010 (#10000995)	5031 University Way NE; 47°39′44″N 122°18′47″W	
206	University National Bank Building	University National Bank Building	September 9, 2021 (#100006904)	4500 University Way N.E. 47°39′41″N 122°18′47″W	
207	University of Washington Faculty Club	University of Washington Faculty Club	July 18, 2016 (#16000464)	4020 E. Stevens Way; 47°39′20″N 122°18′16″W	
208	Victorian Apartments	Victorian Apartments	December 18, 1990 (#90001864)	1234-1238 S. King St. 47°35′55″N 122°18′56″W	
209	Virginia V	Virginia V	April 24, 1973 (#73001875)	4250 21st Ave., W. 47°37′55″N 122°22′54″W	
210	William Volker Building	William Volker Building	October 13, 1983 (#83004236)	1000 Lenora St. 47°37′06″N 122°20′30″W	Now part of Cornish College of the Arts.
211	Volunteer Park	Volunteer Park	May 3, 1976 (#76001894)	Between E. Prospect and E. Galer Sts., and Federal and E. 15th Aves. 47°37′50″N 122°18′52″W	
212	Wagner Houseboat	Wagner Houseboat	February 19, 1982 (#82004255)	2770 Westlake Ave., N. 47°38′45″N 122°20′45″W	
213	Wallingford Fire and Police Station	Wallingford Fire and Police Station	January 27, 1983 (#83003347)	1629 N. 45th St. 47°39′42″N 122°20′09″W	
214	Wallingford-Meridian Streetcar Historic District	Wallingford-Meridian Streetcar Historic District	December 9, 2022 (#100008441)	Roughly bounded by North and NE 50th St., 5th Avenue NE, NE 45th and North 46th Sts., and Interlake Ave. North; 47°39′46″N 122°20′21″W	
215	Ward House	Ward House	March 16, 1972 (#72001277)	520 E. Denny Way; 47°36′48″N 122°19′39″W	
216	Washington Athletic Club	Washington Athletic Club	May 14, 2018 (#100002408)	1325 Sixth Ave. 47°36′35″N 122°20′00″W	
217	Washington Hall	Washington Hall	December 13, 2010 (#10001018)	153 14th Ave. 47°36′04″N 122°19′18″W	
218	Washington Street Public Boat Landing Facility	Washington Street Public Boat Landing Facility	June 10, 1974 (#74001961)	S. Washington St. west of Alaskan Way; 47°36′04″N 122°19′18″W	
219	James W. Jr. & Janie Washington Home & Studio	James W. Jr. & Janie Washington Home & Studio	May 29, 2025 (#100011848)	1816 26th Avenue; 47°37′06″N 122°17′55″W	
220	Wawona	Wawona	July 1, 1970 (#70000643)	Seattle Police Harbor Patrol Dock, foot of Densmore St. 47°38′43″N 122°20′21″W	
221	West Point Light Station	West Point Light Station	August 16, 1977 (#77001336)	West of Fort Lawton. 47°39′44″N 122°26′04″W	
222	White Center Fieldhouse and Caretaker Cottage	White Center Fieldhouse and Caretaker Cottage	July 21, 2015 (#15000455)	1321 SW. 102nd St. 47°30′43″N 122°21′08″W	
223	Wilke Farmhouse	Wilke Farmhouse	November 1, 1974 (#74001962)	1920 2nd Ave. North; 47°38′12″N 122°21′06″W	
224	Windham Apartments	Windham Apartments	August 2, 2006 (#06000669)	420 Blanchard St. 47°37′01″N 122°20′32″W	
225	Women's University Club of Seattle	Women's University Club of Seattle	July 10, 2009 (#09000507)	1105 6th Ave. 47°36′28″N 122°19′53″W	
226	Ye College Inn	Ye College Inn	February 25, 1982 (#82004256)	4000 University Way NE; 47°39′26″N 122°18′42″W	
227	YWCA Building-Seattle	YWCA Building-Seattle	December 29, 2006 (#06001215)	1118 Fifth Avenue; 47°36′28″N 122°19′58″W	
228	Zodiac (schooner)	Zodiac (schooner)	April 29, 1982 (#82004248)	Lake Union Dry Dock; 47°37′56″N 122°19′38″W	Home port is now in Bellingham, Washington.

== Former listings ==
	Name on the Register	Image	Date listed	Date removed	Location	Description
1	Adams School	Adams School	May 19, 1988 (#88000603)	July 16, 1990	2637 N.W. Sixty-second St.	Demolished in 1989 due to the building's susceptibility to earthquake damage.
2	Broadway High School	Broadway High School	July 11, 1974 (#74002297)	December 13, 1976	Broadway Ave. and E. Pine St.	Demolished in 1974.
3	Girls' Parental School		June 22, 1988 (#88000741)	July 16, 1990	6612 Sixty-fifth Ave., S.	
4	Lacey V. Murrow Floating Bridge	Lacey V. Murrow Floating Bridge	April 29, 1987 (#87000866)	March 11, 1991	Lake Washington	Sank in 1990. Rebuilt.

== See also ==
- List of Seattle landmarks
- List of National Historic Landmarks in Washington (state)
- National Register of Historic Places listings in King County, Washington
- National Register of Historic Places listings in Washington state
