= Dunn Gardens =

- U.S. National Register of Historic Places
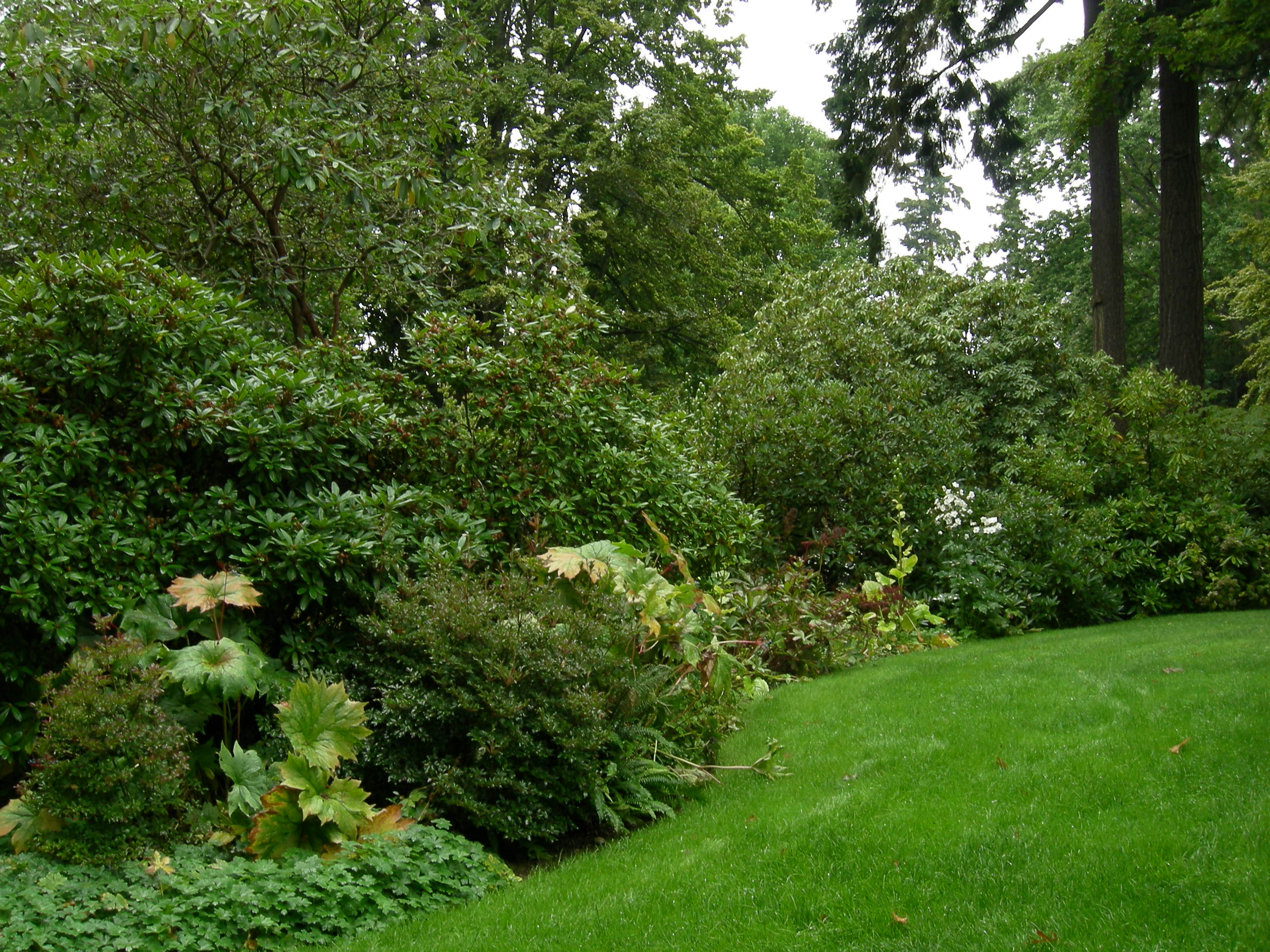
- Dunn Gardens in Seattle, Washington

- Location within Washington (state) Location within the United States
- Location: 13533 Northshire Rd. NW; Seattle, Washington
- Coordinates: 47.7275°N 122.363889°W
- Area: 7.5 acres (3.0 ha)
- Built: 1915–1916
- Architect: James Frederick Dawson for Olmsted Brothers
- Website: Dunn Gardens home page
- NRHP reference No.: 94001435
- Added to NRHP: December 15, 1994

Dunn Gardens in Seattle, Washington, is a privately owned 7.5-acre (3.0 ha) property composed of the remaining acreage of the estate of Arthur G. Dunn Sr., who bought the property in 1914 as a summer get-a-way for his family, and contracted the landscaping to the Olmsted Brothers. Upon his death, the property was inherited by his children. His son Edward B. Dunn provided for the care of his share of the estate in his will. A trust was created two years after his death to oversee the entire property. Dunn Gardens were listed on the National Register of Historic Places on December 15, 1994, and is open for special public events and docent-led guided tours April through July, and from September through October.

== Dunn and Agen background ==
In 1889, New York resident Arthur G. Dunn Sr. joined his boyhood friend Elton Ainsworth in the first Seattle fish cannery business that established a profitable customer base beyond the local region. John B. Agen was another New Yorker who relocated to Seattle and became wealthy through marketplace innovations that transformed the regional dairy industry. He made several real estate investments, including the Agen Warehouse, now listed on the National Register of Historic Places in Seattle.

== Development of the estate and gardens ==
Agen purchased 20-acre (8.1 ha) of land, south of The Highlands and west of Bitter Lake in 1911, not only for its vast abundance of Douglas firs, but also because he envisioned its potential for garden areas. When Dunn bought 10-acre (4.0 ha) of Agen's property for $7,000 in 1914, he was living in the affluent neighborhood of First Hill, Seattle with his wife Jeannette and five children, Arthur Jr., Edward Bernard (known as Edward B.), Maurice, Gertrude and Dorothy. Dunn planned to build a summer house for his family. The 7.5-acre (3.0 ha) that are today known as the Dunn Gardens are what remains of the original 10-acre (4.0 ha).

The Olmsted Brothers were contracted by Dunn and Agen to landscape their adjoining properties. The Massachusetts-based landscape architectural firm founded by John Charles Olmsted and Frederick Law Olmsted Jr. was well known in Seattle as the design architects of the city parks system. The Olmsted Brothers delegated the design project to employee James Frederick Dawson in 1915, while Carl Frelinghuysen Gould of the architectural firm of Bebb and Gould was contracted to design the Dunn and Agen residences. The landscaping was meant to complement the surrounding botanical features. Existing fir trees were kept, and Dunn requested that deciduous trees be added to the property. Numerous plan revisions for the Dunn house and landscaping were submitted between 1915 and 1916. The two firms worked conjointly to produce the most aesthetically pleasing habitation amid the botanical resources. Eastern side vegetation was left in its natural state. The ocean vista side was developed for a leisure lifestyle with tennis courts, a croquet lawn, vegetable gardens, a chicken house, gardener's cottage, automobile garage, and a flower garden.

== Oversight of the gardens ==
Agen died in 1920, leaving the bulk of this estate to his widow Florence. In 1940, Dunn built a cottage on his property for his daughter Dorothy. He died in 1945, bequeathing the property to four of his five children. The original summer house had become uninhabitable and was torn down shortly after Maurice built a new house for himself. In order to circumvent an eminent domain seizure of part of the property for the purposes of creating a school, 2.5-acre (1.0 ha) of the Dunn property and an unspecified acreage of the Agen property were sold to a developer in 1952, resulting in the development of the Northshire subdivision of Seattle. The remaining 7.5-acre (3.0 ha) of the Dunn property are now the gardens.

Edward B. and his sister Dorothy Bayley became the primary caretakers of the property after their father's death. When Edward B. converted the garage into a house for himself, he also began making enhancements to the surrounding landscape. A lifelong gardening enthusiast, he developed a woodland garden connected through winding trails, and filled it with blooming flora native the Pacific Northwest, in particular rhododendron. He was president of The Rhododendron Society and was so enthusiastic about the plant, that the society name a species after him. When he died in 1991, his will contained provisions for care of his share of the Dunn property. One week before his death, Ed walked the grounds with Gil Schieber an established public garden creator, hired under Streatfield, Gil was entrusted to preserve the treasures and begin public access. The E. B. Dunn Historic Garden Trust was established in 1993 to oversee the entire Dunn property.

In 1994, the property was added to the National Register of Historic Places listings in Seattle. Curators Glenn Withey and Charles Price became the curators in 1996. The gardens are accessible to the public April through July, and from September through October, either by docent-led guided tours or otherwise for numerous special public events hosted by the gardens. Among the past events have been the "Mallets in Wonderland: An Afternoon of Whimsical Croquet in the Gardens" with participants dressed as the White Rabbit, "King and Queen of Wonderland", and other characters from Alice's Adventures in Wonderland, lectures, musical events and tours of specific botanical features.
