= Richard A. Ballinger House =

Historic home in Seattle, Washington, US

- U.S. National Register of Historic Places
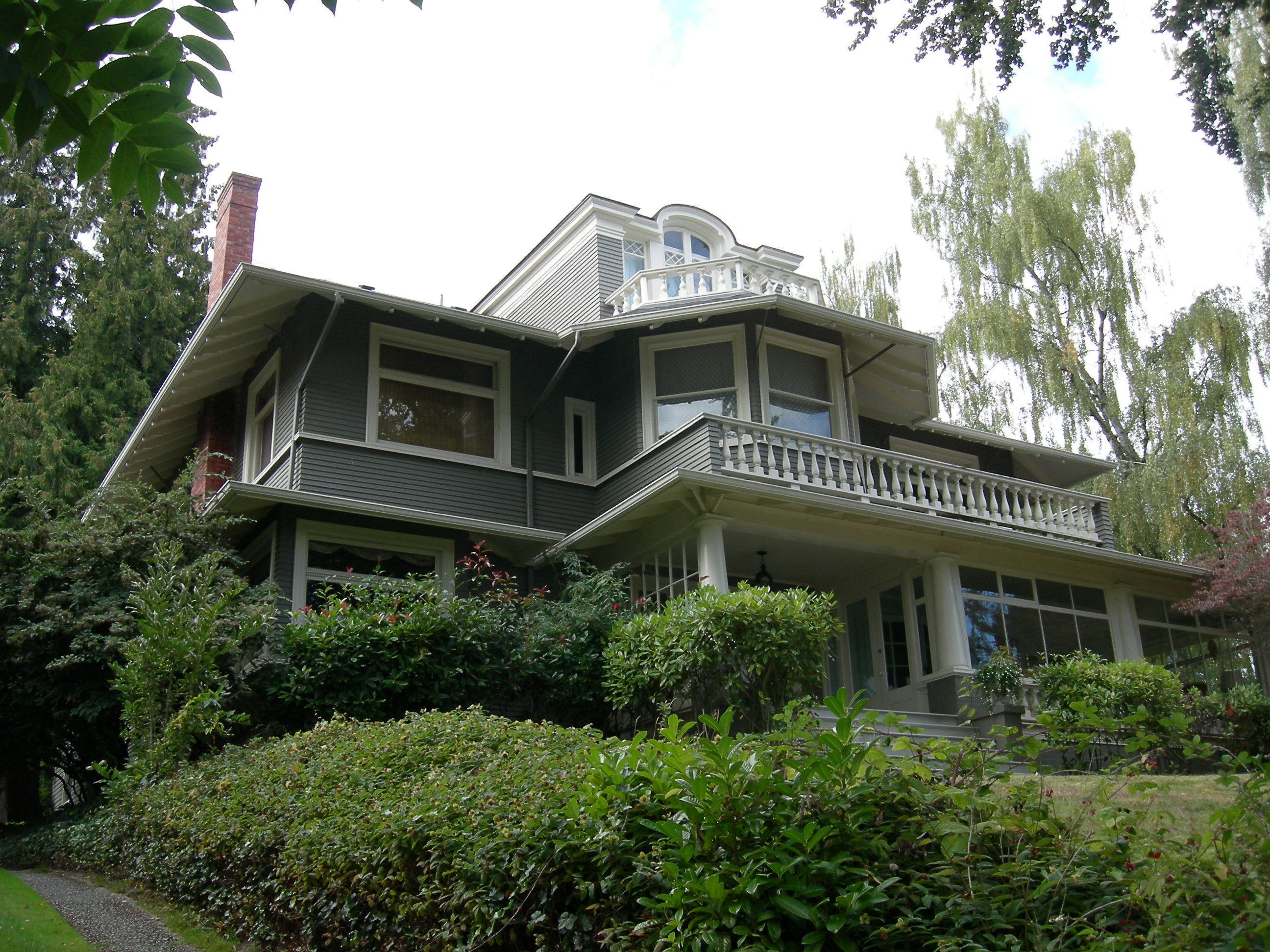
- Ballinger House on 39th Avenue

- Location within Washington (state) Location within the United States
- Location: 1733 39th Avenue, Seattle, Washington, U.S.
- Coordinates: 47°37′04″N 122°16′56″W
- Area: 60 ft (18 m) by 127 ft (39 m)
- Built: 1902; 124 years ago
- Architectural style: Colonial Revival
- NRHP reference No.: 76001886
- Added to NRHP: May 28, 1976

The Richard A. Ballinger House is a historic residence located in the Madrona neighborhood of Seattle, Washington. The house was listed on the National Register of Historic Places on March 26, 1979. The residence is a well-maintained example of 20th-century Colonial Revival architecture.

== History ==
The Richard A. Ballinger House was built for Frederick Crane Harper (1855–1936), a past state senator and founder of Harper Brick & Tile company and Harper Barge & Lighterage company. In 1906 he left Seattle to take a position as a Customs Collector. The house was then purchased by attorney Richard Achilles Ballinger (1858–1922), a former mayor of Seattle from 1904-1906, Commissioner of the U.S. General Land Office from 1907-1908, and U.S. Secretary of the Interior from 1909–1911 under president William Howard Taft.

The Ballinger House is situated on the corner of East Howell Street and 39th Avenue in the Madrona neighborhood of Seattle, on a lot measuring 60 ft (18 m) by 127 ft (39 m), boarding Lake Washington. The 2 1/2-and-one-half story cedar clapboard residence is 31 ft (9.4 m) by 43 ft (13 m) with a hipped roof and sits on a concrete basement. It has a partially enclosed wrap-around porch, bay windows on the second floor, and two brick chimneys. Construction of the Colonial Revival-style home began in 1902 and was completed in 1903.

After the death of Ballinger in 1922, his wife sold the property. It changed hands twice before the current owners acquired it in 1960.

== Historical significance ==
The Ballinger House is historically significant based on its example of Colonial Revival architecture, association with Richard A. Ballinger, and its location in the Madrona neighborhood. The residence was visited by President Taft in 1909. The Richard A. Ballinger House was officially listed the National Register of Historic Places (NRHP) on May 28, 1976.

== See also ==
- Harper, Washington
- Seattle Landmarks Preservation Board
- National Register of Historic Places listings in Seattle
