= Ballard-Howe House =

Historic home in Seattle, Washington, US

- U.S. National Register of Historic Places
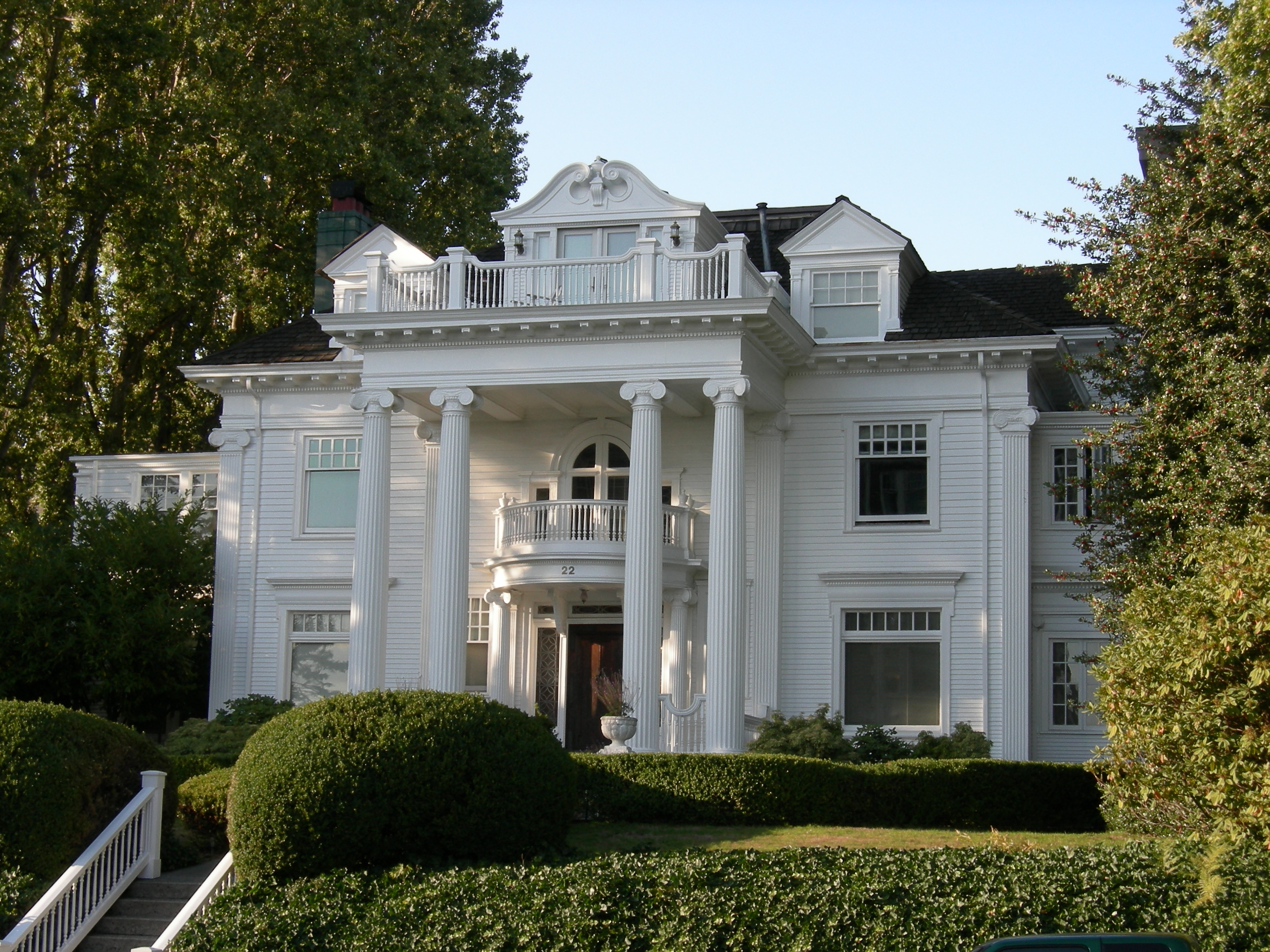
- Front view of Ballard-Howe House

- Location within Washington (state) Location within the United States
- Location: 22 W. Highland Drive, Seattle, Washington, U.S.
- Coordinates: 47°37′48″N 122°21′23″W
- Area: 13,870 square feet (1,289 m^{2})
- Built: 1900; 126 years ago
- Built by: Tomlinson and Windsor
- Architect: Emil De Neuf; August F Heide
- Architectural style: Colonial Revival
- NRHP reference No.: 79002536
- Added to NRHP: March 26, 1979

The Ballard-Howe House is a historic residence located in the neighborhood of Queen Anne in Seattle, Washington. The house was listed on the National Register of Historic Places on March 26, 1979. It was one of the first Colonial Revival-style homes built in the Seattle area that remains today.

== History ==
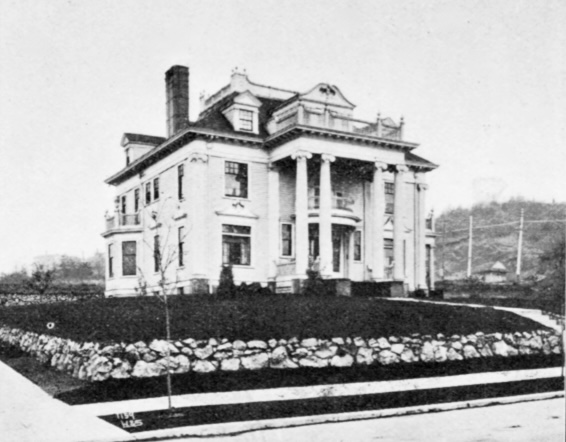
The Ballard Residence on Highland Drive, ca. 1903

The Ballard-Howe House was commissioned by Martin D. Ballard (1832–1907), a Seattle businessman. The residence was designed by architects Emil De Neuf and August F. Heide, and built by general contractors Tomlinson and Windsor in 1900 and completed in 1901. The house is located on Queen Anne Hill with views of the city and Elliott Bay. It is one of the first New England Colonial Revival-style homes built in the Seattle area and the last that still stands today. Ballard lived in the house until he died in 1907.

The 60 ft (18 m) by 55 ft (17 m) three-story 9,148 square feet (849.9 m^{2}) house sits on a brick foundation and occupies a 13,870 square feet (1,289 m^{2}) lot. The exterior of the house is clad in cedar clapboard siding. The front of the house is mainly unchanged with a semicircular front porch within a two-story entrance Portico. The original house contained a front living room and parlor, a dining area and kitchen, a library, and four bedrooms on the second floor. The third floor contains what was called a "ballroom."

In 1911, Ballard's wife sold the house to Judge George Donworth (1861–1947), a United States district judge of the United States District Court for the Western District of Washington. Donworth renovated the house, and later sold it to attorney James Blake Howe (1860–1930) in 1911. Due to the Great Depression, Howe's widow sold the house in 1932 to I. J. Trahan for less than what they paid for it. Trahan converted the residence into five rental apartments, which were designed by architect Herman A. Moldenhour (1880–1976). Rooms on each of the floors were converted into apartment units, and the kitchen and entrance were changed.

The residence was then sold in 1937 to Dr. Richard Perry who added more apartment space on the east and west sides of the building. The additions were designed by Seattle architect Joseph Simon Cote (1874–1957), who designed other homes in the area. In 1950, Perry sold the residence to C. B. Williams who later sold it to James H. and Alvina J. LaRue in 1958. In 1965, LaRue's widow sold the house to Sheldon Austin and his wife, who renovated the building. In 1975, the residence was sold to the current owners the Steven Sarich-Lotto family.

== Historical significance ==
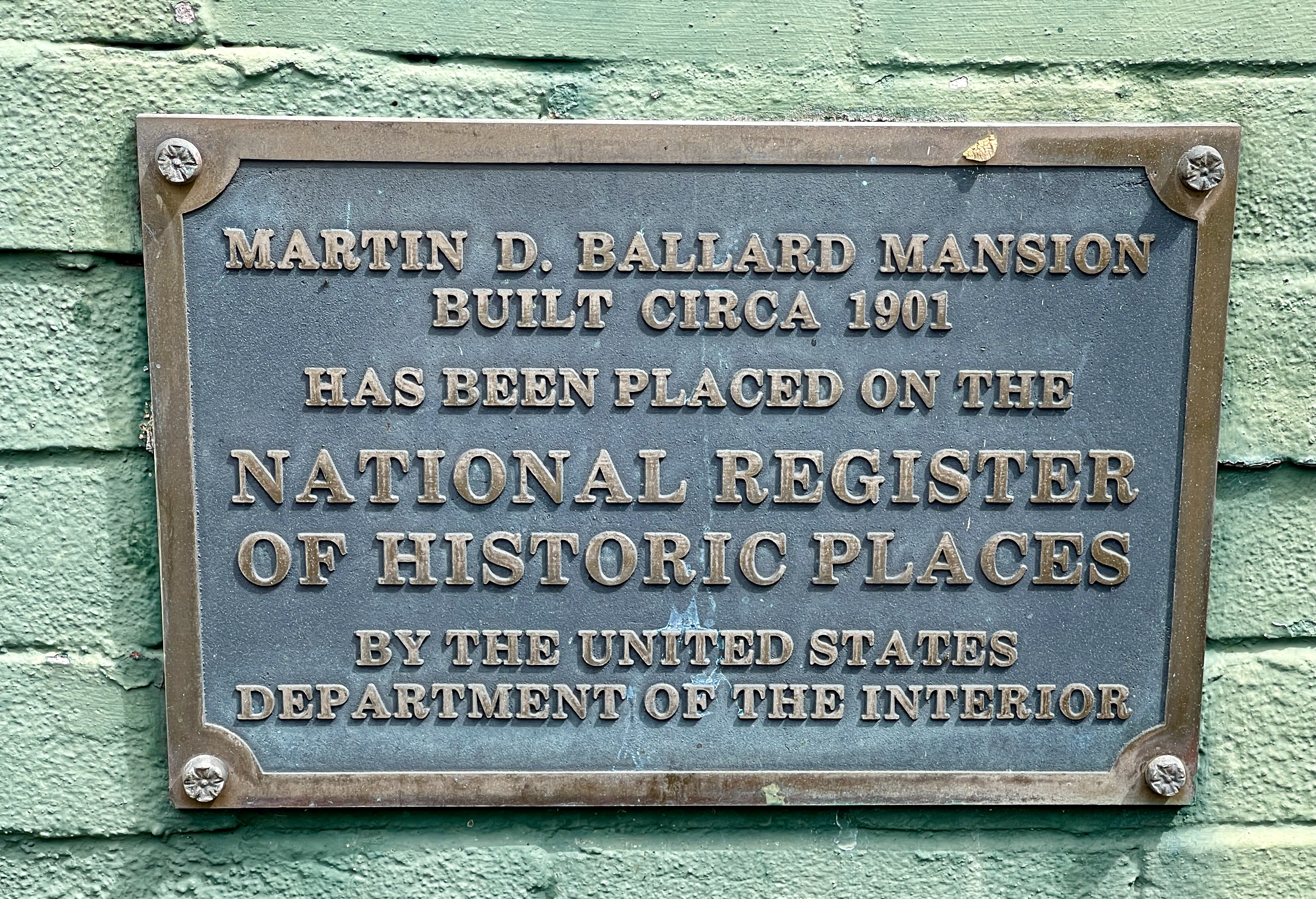
Martin D. Ballard Mansion National Register of Historic Places Plaque

On June 30, 1978, the city of Seattle Landmarks Preservation Board wrote a report on the Ballard-Howe House after a public hearing. They voted to approve designation of the residence as a Seattle Landmark based on its association with the cultural heritage of the community, as an example of Colonial Revival architecture, the work of architects Emil De Neuf and August F Heide, and its location in the Queen Anne neighborhood.

In February 1979, the Ballard-Howe House was nominated to be listed on the National Register of Historic Places (NRHP), and was officially listed the National Register on March 26, 1979.

== See also ==
- List of Seattle landmarks
- National Register of Historic Places listings in Seattle
