= Ford Motor Company Assembly Plant (Seattle) =

Coordinates: 47°33′30″N 122°20′25″W

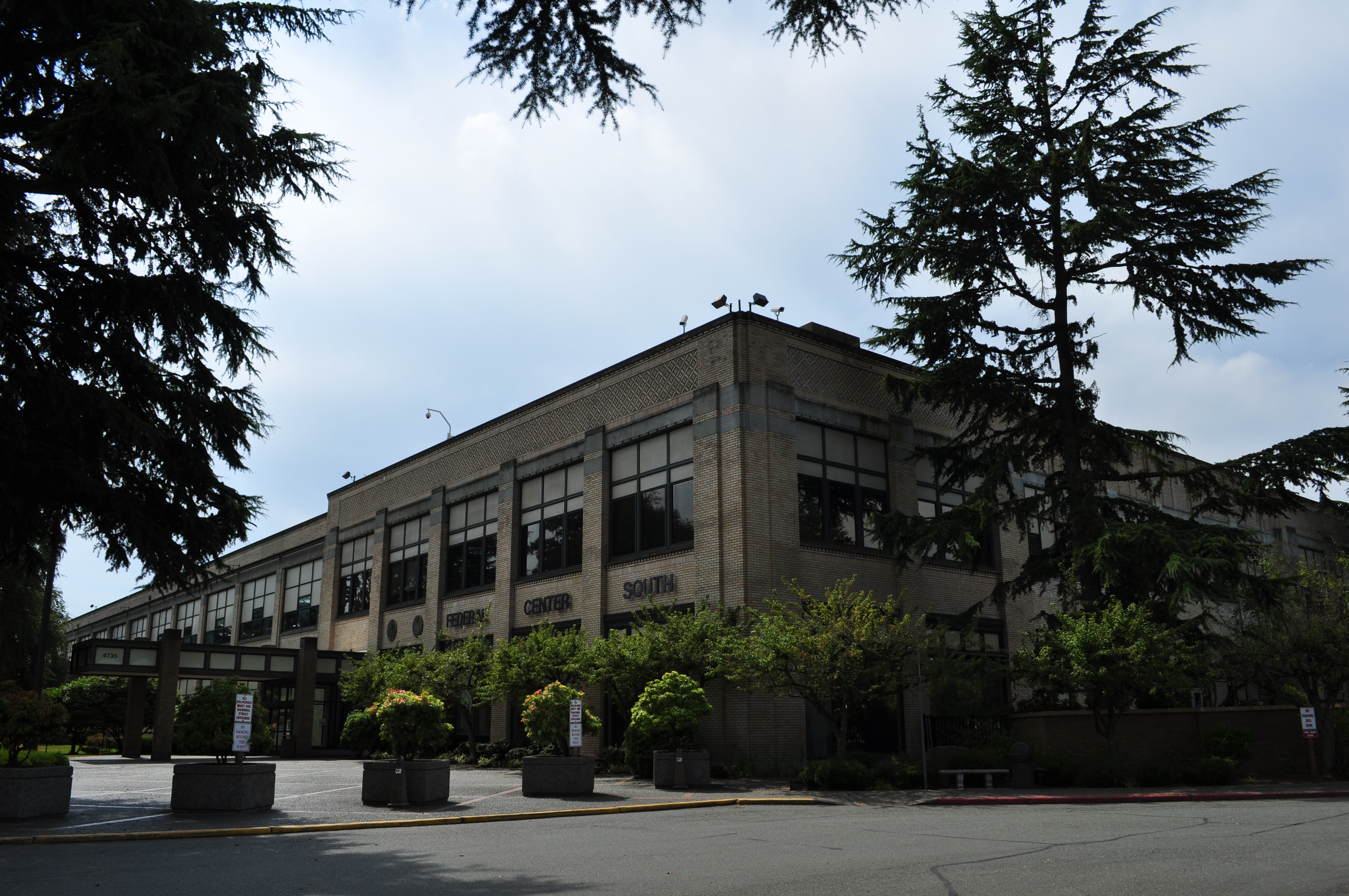
The building's exterior in 2012

The Ford Motor Company Assembly Plant is a building located at 4735 E. Marginal Way South in Seattle, Washington. Designed by Albert Kahn, it was added to the National Register of Historic Places on October 9, 2013. It is now part of the Federal Center South complex and is owned by the General Services Administration.

== History ==
The factory opened in May 1932 as a replacement for the original Seattle factory in South Lake Union, but closed in December of that year. It remained a Ford sales and service site through 1941.

As early as 1940, the U.S. Army occupied a portion of the facility which had become known as the "Seattle General Depot". The facility was sold to the US Government in 1942 for use as a staging site for supplies headed for the Pacific Front. The U.S. Army continued to use the facility until 1956, when the U.S. Air Force acquired control of the property and leased the facility to the Boeing Company. A year later, Boeing purchased the property. Known as the Boeing Airplane Company Missile Production Center, the facility provided support functions for several aerospace and defense related development programs, including the organizational and management facilities for the Minuteman-1 missile program, deployed in 1960, and the Minuteman-II missile program, deployed in 1969. The Boeing Aerospace Group also used the former Ford plant for several other development and manufacturing uses, such as developing aspects of the Lunar Orbiter Program, producing unstaffed spacecraft to photograph the moon in 1966–1967, the BOMARC defensive missile system, and hydrofoil boats. After 1970, Boeing phased out its operations at the former Ford plant, moving them to the Boeing Space Center in the city of Kent and the company's other Seattle plant complex. Owned by the General Services Administration since 1973, it is known as the "Federal Center South Complex", housing various government offices.

== See also ==
- National Register of Historic Places listings in Seattle, Washington
