= Wagner Houseboat =

Historic houseboat in Washington, United States

- U.S. National Register of Historic Places
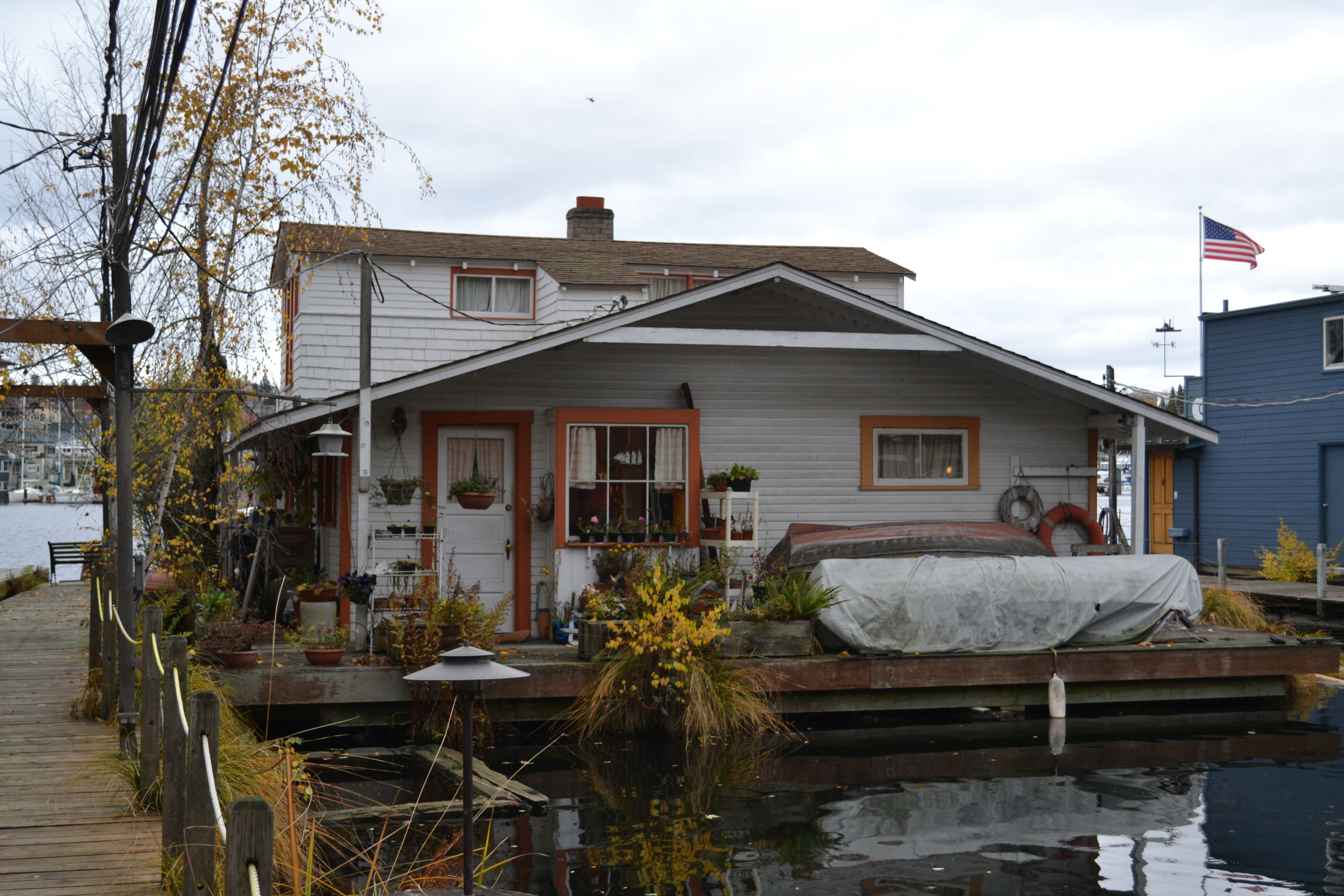
- The Wagner Houseboat (2011)

- Location within Washington (state) Location within the United States
- Location: 2770 Westlake Avenue, N. Seattle, Washington, U.S.
- Nearest city: Seattle, Washington
- Coordinates: 47°38′45″N 122°20′45″W
- Built: 1909
- Architectural style: Cottage style
- NRHP reference No.: 82004255
- Added to NRHP: February 19, 1982

The Wagner Houseboat, also known as The Old Boathouse, is a historic floating home in Seattle, Washington. It is located in Lake Union at 2770 Westlake Avenue, near the Aurora Bridge. Built in 1912, it is named after Richard Wagner, who bought it in the 1950s. Wagner and his wife Colleen later founded the Center for Wooden Boats, which was based out of their houseboat.

As one of Seattle's oldest houseboats, the Wagner Houseboat was listed on the National Register of Historic Places on February 19, 1982.

Today, the Wagner Boathouse commemorates the transition of South Lake Union from industrial use to a residential community. The houseboat is one of few remaining relics of the once-prominent floating resort communities on Lake Washington.

== History ==
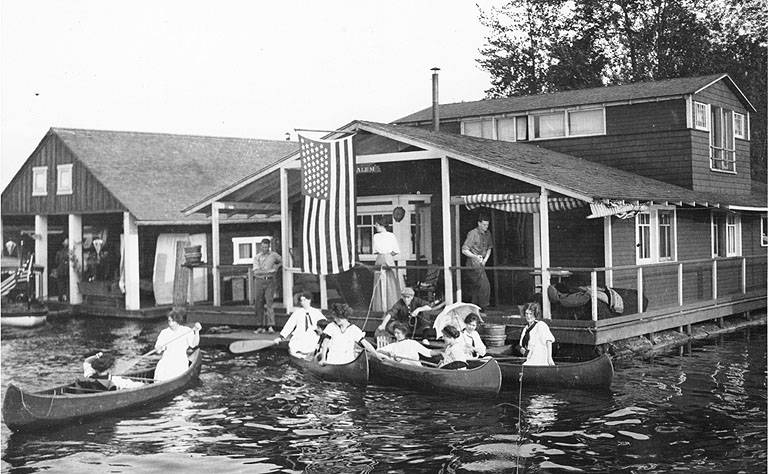
Houseboat on Lake Washington: 1912

The construction of houseboats and other floating structures became popular in the Pacific Northwest during the late 19th century, beginning as a cheap shelter for laborers in the lumber and fishing industries. The antisocial behavior of these floating home inhabitants quickly gave houseboats an unfavorable image due to the illegal activity that often took place on the water's edge. The construction of streetcars and cable cars to the Lake Washington waterfront caused houseboats to become associated with wealthier residents, who used them for social gatherings. During the height of their popularity, approximately 4,000 houseboats rested on the waterways in and around Seattle, however those numbers declined to nearly 500 during the 1950s.

The Wagner Houseboat was built in 1912 and originally docked near Madison Park. In 1938, after installing sewer lines along the shores of the lake, the city of Seattle required houseboats on Lake Washington to be connected to sewer lines. The requirement to add expensive sewer lines caused a mass migration of houseboats from Lake Washington to Lake Union, where there was no sewer requirement until 1967. In 1938, the Wagner Houseboat was towed from Lake Washington to its current location on Lake Union.

=== Wagner's Ownership ===
In the late 1950s, during a summer internship, Dick Wagner "fell in love with Seattle". At the time, he was an architecture student in New York City where his love for building design flourished. He would walk the streets of New York and admire the historic design of the local architecture. Dick preferred to learn through hands-on experience rather than from a textbook and classroom setting. Upon graduating from both Yale and Columbia, Dick returned to Seattle with a passion to turn Seattle into a national treasure and destination location for tourists. Dick's impression on the waterfront communities of Seattle will be felt forever. He had a passion for teaching others to sail regardless of economic or cultural ability, which led to the creation of the Center for Wooden Boats. His mission was to make sailing accessible to the public and to teach them sailing through hands of experience. Dick died at his home on April 20, 2017.

== Center for Wooden Boats ==
The Wagner Houseboat was the birthplace of the Center for Wooden Boats. In the late 1950s, Dick and Colleen Wagner began collecting and restoring old wooden boats; storing the collection behind their home. Then, using their collection of small restored wooden boats, the couple decided to create a non-profit boat rental center out of their home by hanging a sign that says, "The Old Boathouse" on the dock in front of their houseboat. The Old Boathouse officially opened as a non-profit on February 1, 1968. After this, the Center for Wooden Boats museum was born. Eventually, friends of the Wagner's began spending time at their home helping them restore these old wooden boats. This group of friends continued to grow both in numbers and in their devotion to preserving the history of wooden boats. They became so committed that they’d end up staying late night after night helping the couple with their restoration process and joining in the effort of the mission created by Dick and Colleen.

Once the couple realized the strong devotion of others in the community, it became apparent to the couple that this group of volunteers could support a nonprofit organization guided by their mission. Therefore, on February 3, 1976, Dick and Colleen decided to begin plans to open the Center for Wooden Boats as a way to maintain the history of sailing and wooden boats. This mission also aimed to get anyone and everyone, no matter their physical ability or financial ability, out on the water and given the chance to learn to sail. When the Center for Wooden Boats was officially created, operations were moved out of the Wagner Houseboat and into an official Center for Wooden Boats nonprofit location.

The Center for Wooden Boats (CWB) then grew into a large and committed group of volunteers. As a result, other nonprofit leaders around the country have focused on how CWB could build such a devoted community and have tried to model their success. Currently, close to 75,000 people visit CWB annually to engage in the various maritime actives they provide.

== Design ==
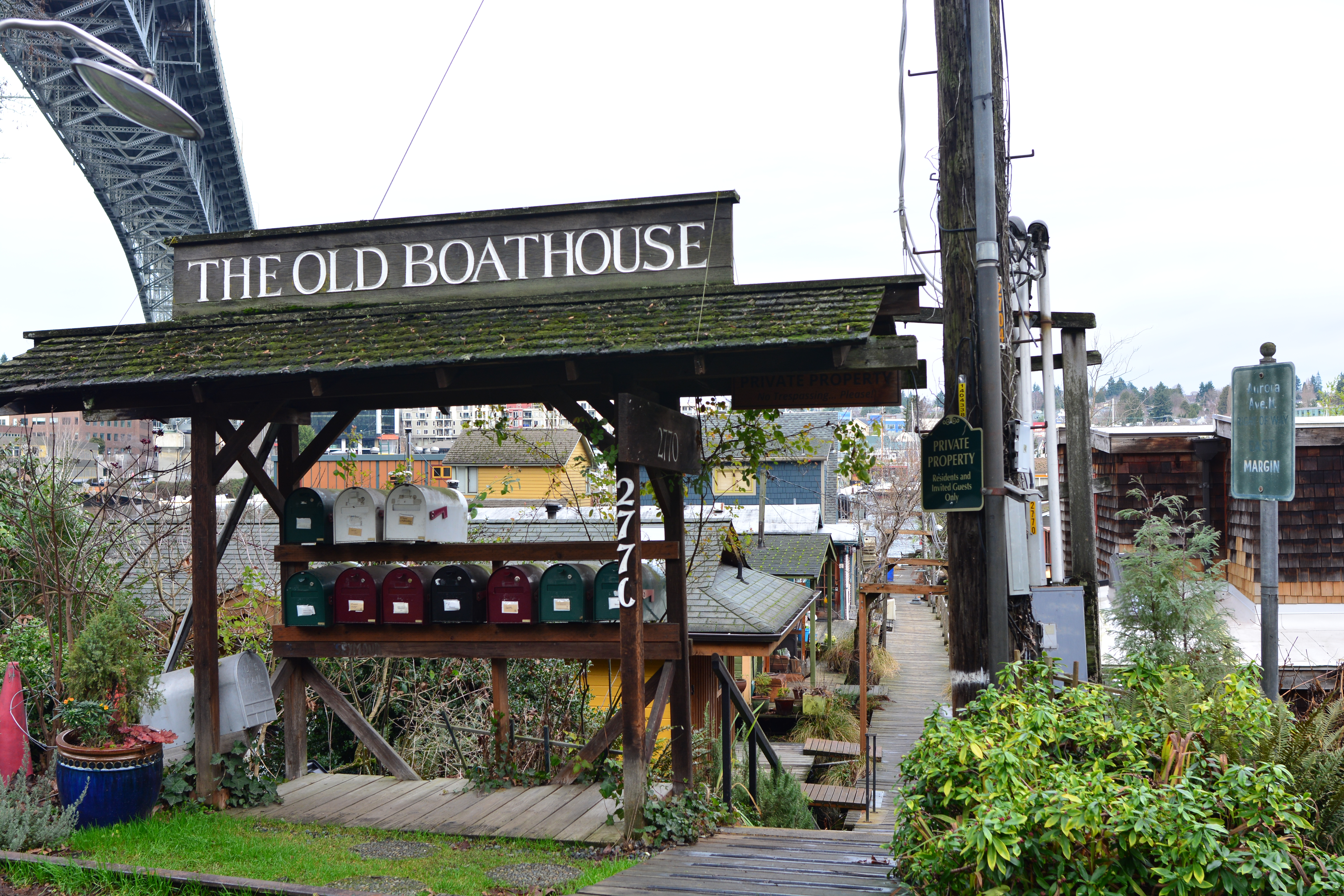
This photo depicts the dock that the Wagner Houseboat (also known as "The Old Boathouse") is located off of.

The Wagner Houseboat was built as a summer home on Lake Washington near Madison Park. It was designed in the "Cottage Style" and constructed from locally sourced wood; it reflects historic building techniques of early houseboat design.

Another advantage to the Wagner Houseboat construction is the fact that, due to any undesired circumstances, the home can simply be moved to another location along the water. The Wagner Houseboat was forced to relocate in 1938.

This feature is becoming increasingly desirable because of the rising sea levels and increased flooding across the globe. If this home was attached to solid ground rather than floating, simply moving the structure from one location to another would have been impossible. This feature of a houseboat construction helps us understand the environmental advantage of floating homes because without its unique floating construction, the inhabitants of the Wagner Houseboat would have had to abandon their home and construct another one in their new location. In a houseboat construction, there is no need to commit to an exact geological location, therefore one can maintain peace of mind knowing they can detach their home and move to a preferred location if needed.

== See also ==
- National Register of Historic Places listings in Seattle
