= Knights of Columbus Hall (Seattle) =

Historic building in Seattle, Washington, U.S.

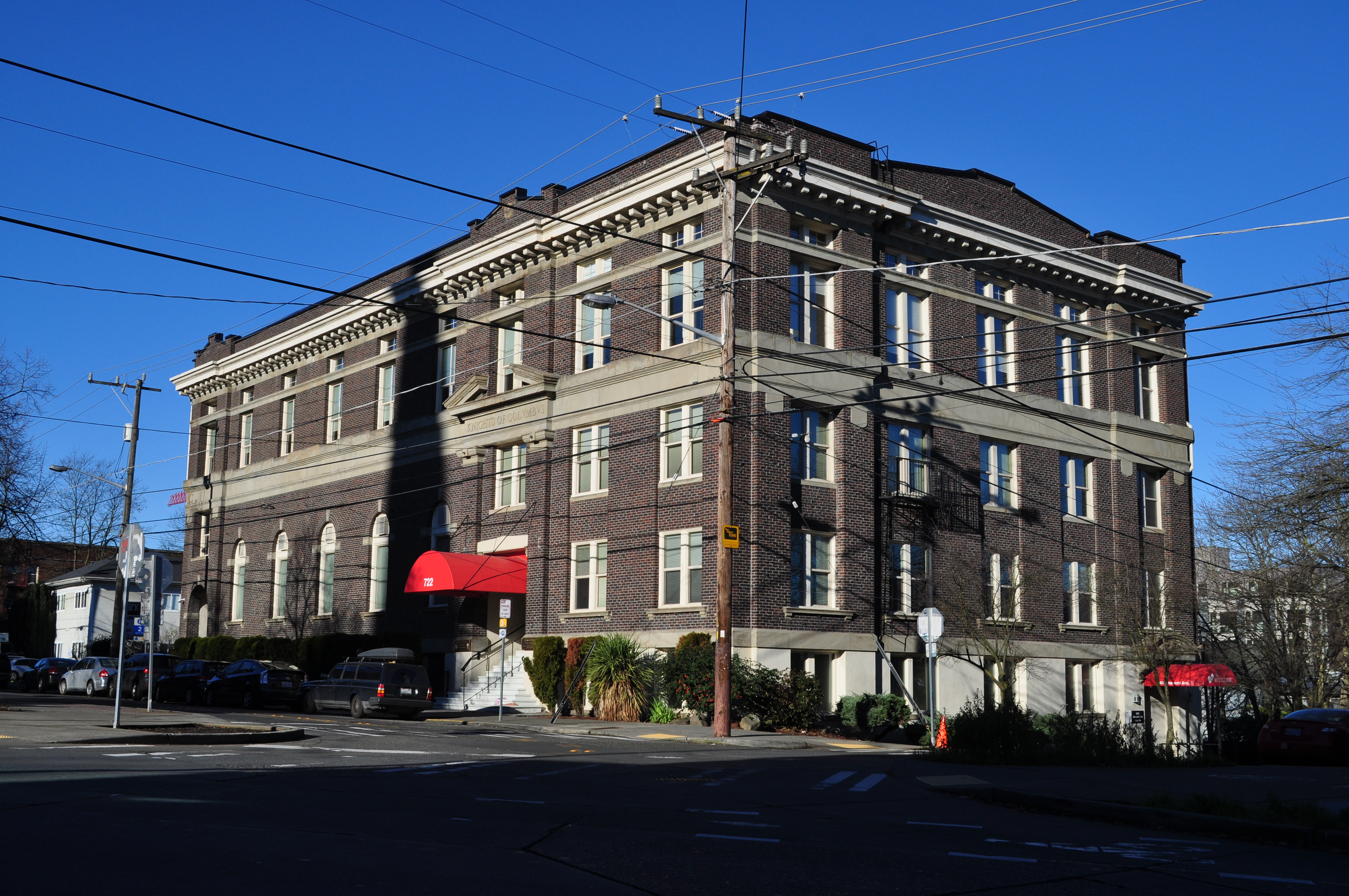
- The building's exterior in 2016
- Interactive map of the Knights of Columbus Hall area

General information
- Location: Seattle, Washington, United States
- Coordinates: 47°36′47″N 122°19′21″W
- Completed: 1912

Design and construction
- Architect: F.W. Bohne

Knights of Columbus Hall is an historic building at 722 East Union Street in Seattle, in the U.S. state of Washington.

== See also ==
- List of Seattle landmarks
- National Register of Historic Places listings in Seattle
