= Colman Automotive Building =

Building in Seattle, Washington, U.S.

- U.S. National Register of Historic Places
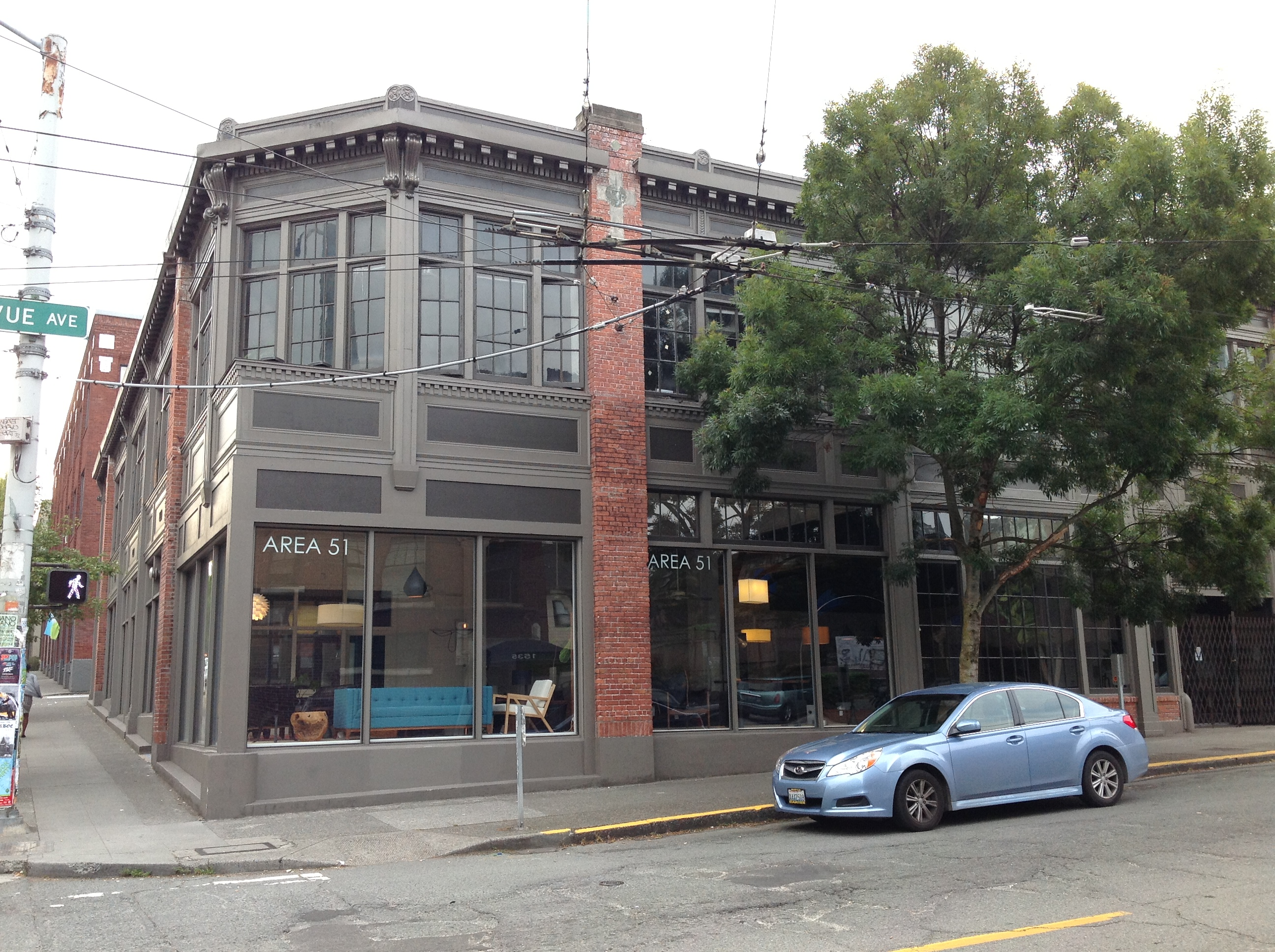
- The building's exterior in 2013

- Location within Washington (state)
- Location: 401 E. Pine St., Seattle, Washington
- Coordinates: 47°36′54″N 122°19′35″W
- Area: less than one acre
- Built: 1916
- Built by: Pederson, Hans
- Architect: Webster & Ford
- Architectural style: Early Commercial
- NRHP reference No.: 13000017
- Added to NRHP: February 13, 2013

The Colman Automotive Building is a building located at 401 E. Pine Street in Seattle, Washington. It was added to the National Register of Historic Places in 2013.

== Description and history ==
The building was designed by Seattle architects Webster & Ford and built during 1915-16 and is about 107 by 92 feet (33 m × 28 m) in plan.

It was used as a car dealership and also for car repair. In 1917 it included a dealership for Stanley Steamer cars and one for United Motors (distributors for Reo, Dart, Cole and Roamer Motor Cars, Indiana, Reo & Duplex Motor Trucks).

It was deemed notable as "one of the last surviving buildings from the early period of Seattle's Pike-Pine "Auto Row" district that has not been significantly altered."

It also served as a gas station by 1937, having a drive-through gas pump area in its northwest corner at East Pine Street and Bellevue Avenue.

== See also ==
- National Register of Historic Places listings in Seattle, Washington
