= Pioneer Hall (Seattle) =

Historic building in Seattle, Washington, U.S.

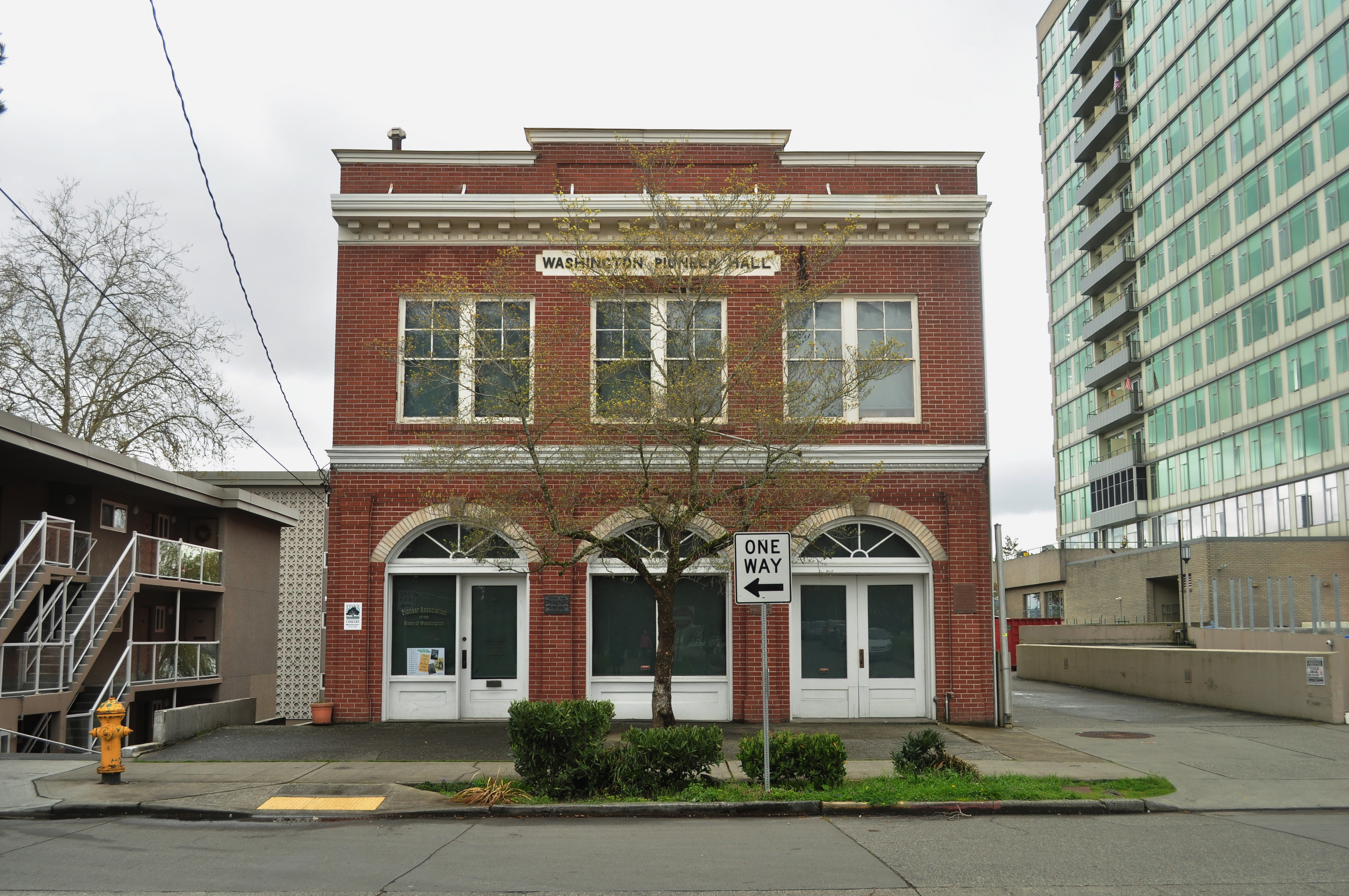
- The building's exterior in 2019
- Interactive map of the Pioneer Hall area

General information
- Coordinates: 47°38′4.5″N 122°16′36.5″W

Pioneer Hall is an historic building in the Madison Park neighborhood of Seattle, in the U.S. state of Washington. The building is listed on the National Register of Historic Places.

The building was erected in 1910 on the western shore of Lake Washington. Before being donated to the museum, the land was previously owned by Judge John J. McGilvra and his wife. Sarah Loretta Denny, a member of David Denny's family, donated $20,000 in funding conditional on the use of the hall to memorialize the early pioneer families.

== See also ==
- National Register of Historic Places listings in Seattle
