= Fire Station No. 25 (Seattle) =

- U.S. National Register of Historic Places
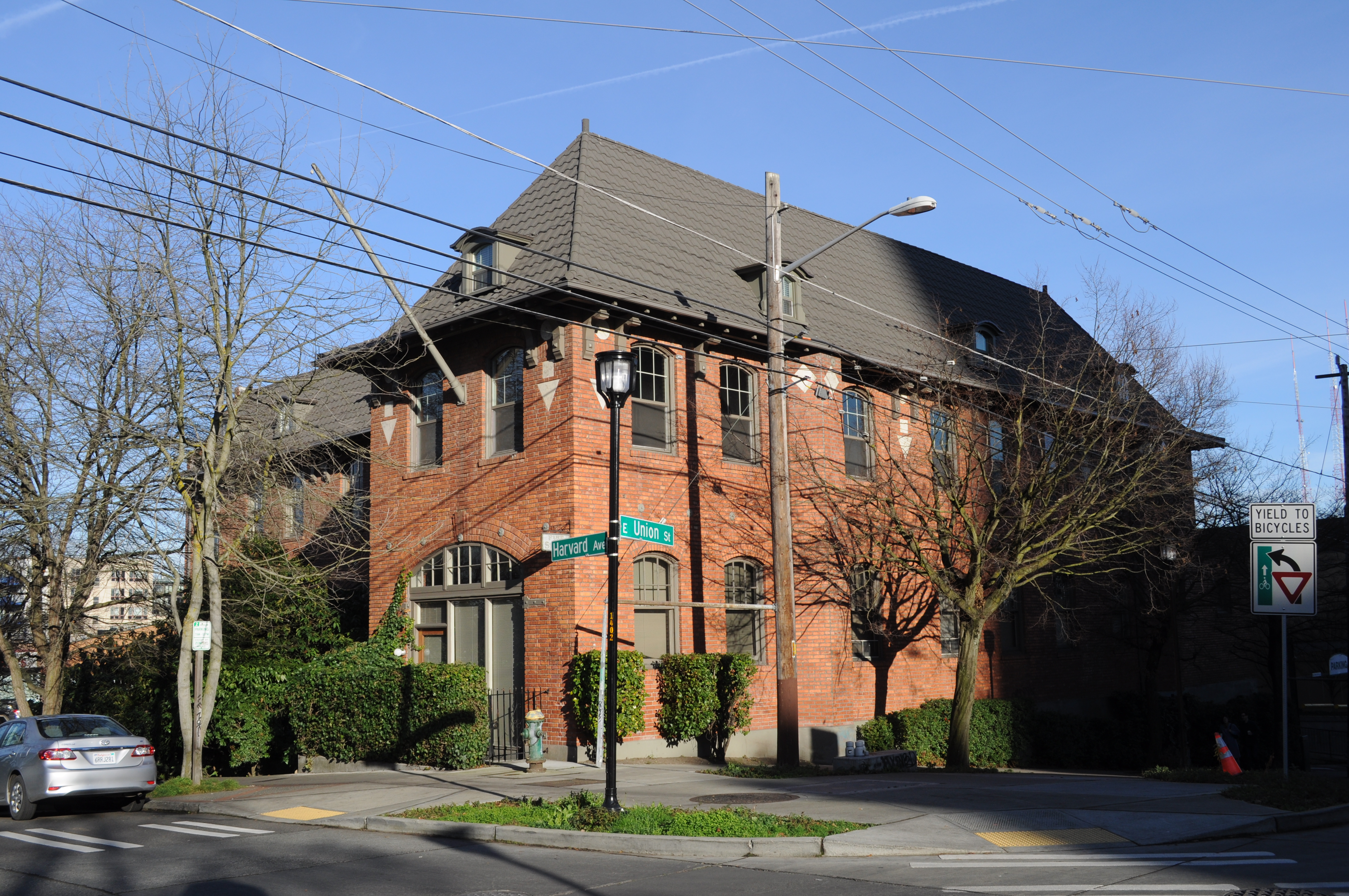
- Fire Station No. 25, 2011

- Location within Downtown Seattle Location within Washington (state) Location within the United States
- Location: 1400 Harvard Ave., Seattle, Washington
- Coordinates: 47°36′49″N 122°19′15″W
- Area: 0.5 acres (0.20 ha)
- Built: 1909
- Architect: Sommerville & Coe
- NRHP reference No.: 72001273
- Added to NRHP: April 14, 1972

Fire Station No. 25 is a former fire station located near the borders of the Capitol Hill and First Hill neighborhoods of Seattle, Washington listed on the National Register of Historic Places. It is now a condominium apartment building.

== See also ==
- List of landmarks in Seattle
- List of National Historic Landmarks in Washington (state)
- National Register of Historic Places listings in Seattle
