= Seattle Public Library University Branch =

Library building in Seattle, Washington, U.S.

Coordinates: 47°39′55″N 122°19′5″W

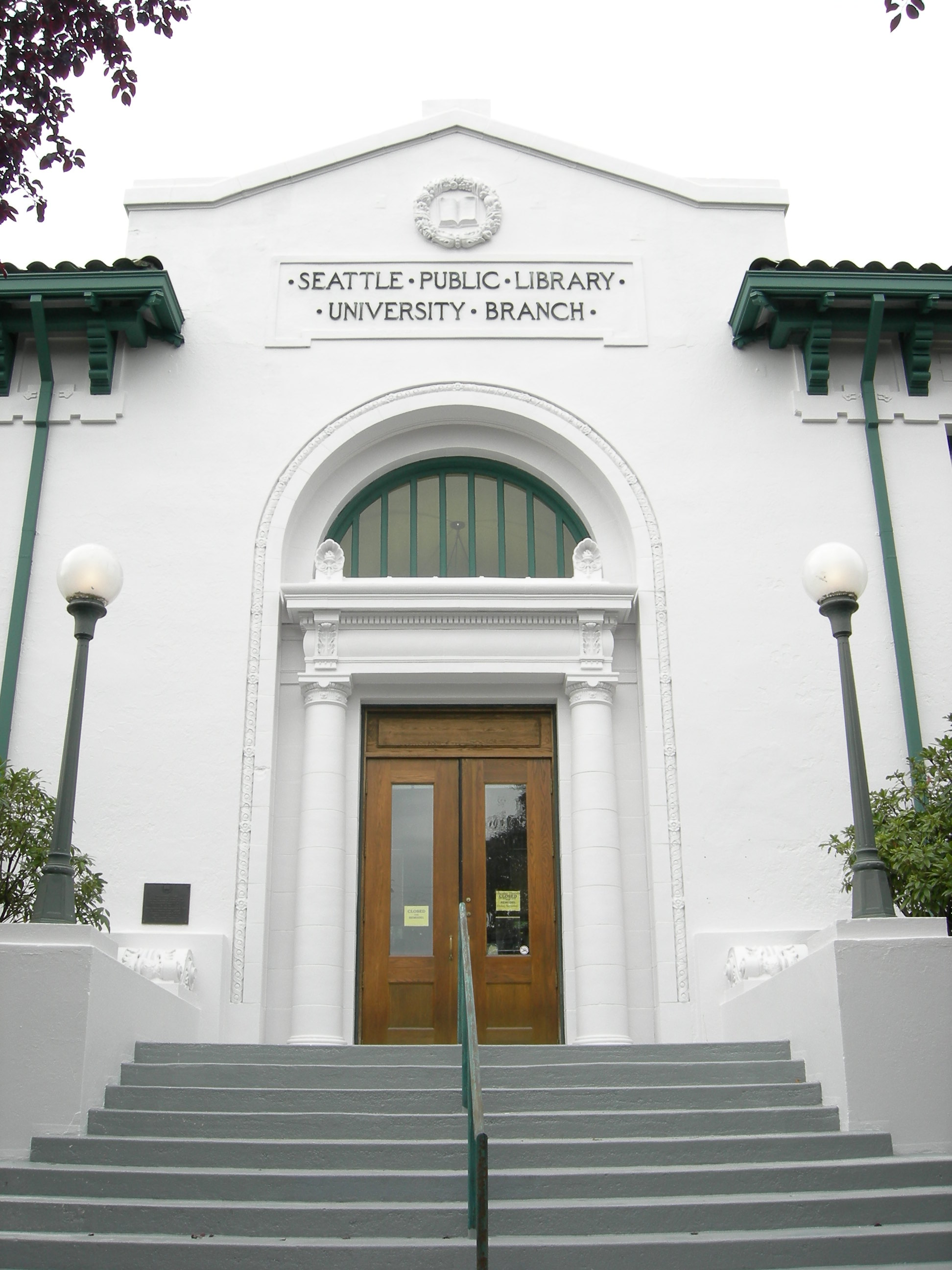
- Location: 5009 Roosevelt Way NE, Seattle, United States
- Established: 1910

The University Branch of Seattle Public Library is located at 5009 Roosevelt Way NE in Seattle, Washington, United States. It is one of the city's oldest library branches.

== See also ==
- National Register of Historic Places listings in Seattle
