= Ballard Avenue Historic District =

Historic district in Washington, United States

Coordinates: 47°40′N 122°23′W

- U.S. National Register of Historic Places
- U.S. Historic district
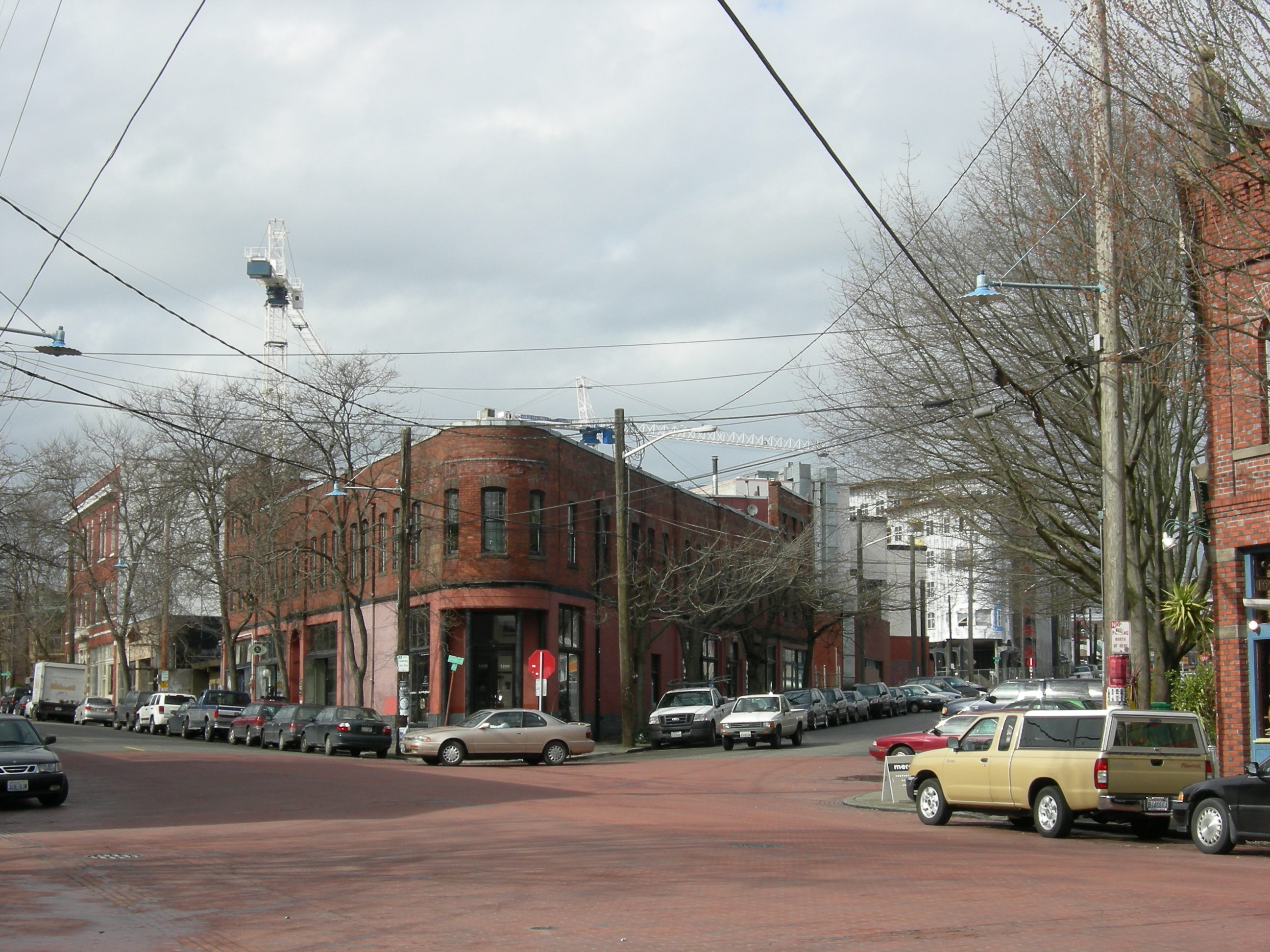
- The Ballard Avenue Historic District

- Location within Washington (state) Location within the United States
- Location: Ballard, Seattle, Washington
- Nearest city: Seattle, Washington
- Built: 1890-
- Architect: Victor W. Voorhees, Henderson Ryan and others
- NRHP reference No.: 76001885
- Added to NRHP: July 1, 1976

The Ballard Avenue Historic District is a section of downtown Ballard in Seattle, Washington state, US, that was listed on the National Register of Historic Places in 1976 (ID #76001885). The district consists of Ballard Avenue N.W. between N.W. Market Street and N.W. Dock Place, and is located near to and along Salmon Bay. After initial work by the Ballard Avenue Association and the city of Seattle's Urban Conservation Division, Seattle mayor Wes Uhlman signed the ordinances that led to the national recognition of the area. The neighborhood of Ballard is known for a large historic population and presence of immigrants from Sweden; King Gustaf of Sweden read the proclamation inducting the district to the historical registry in 1976, and dedicated the new bell tower at Ballard's Marvin's Garden Park, which housed the original bell from Ballard's old city hall. The historic markers that can be seen on 26 of the buildings were created and erected by the Ballard Historical Society.

All the commercial buildings in the historic district face towards Ballard Avenue. Other locations in Ballard that are listed on the National Register of Historic Places include the old Ballard Carnegie Library on N.W. Market Street, the Ballard Bridge, Fire Station No. 18, the Hiram M. Chittenden Locks, and the Lake Washington Ship Canal.
