= Calhoun Hotel =

- U.S. National Register of Historic Places
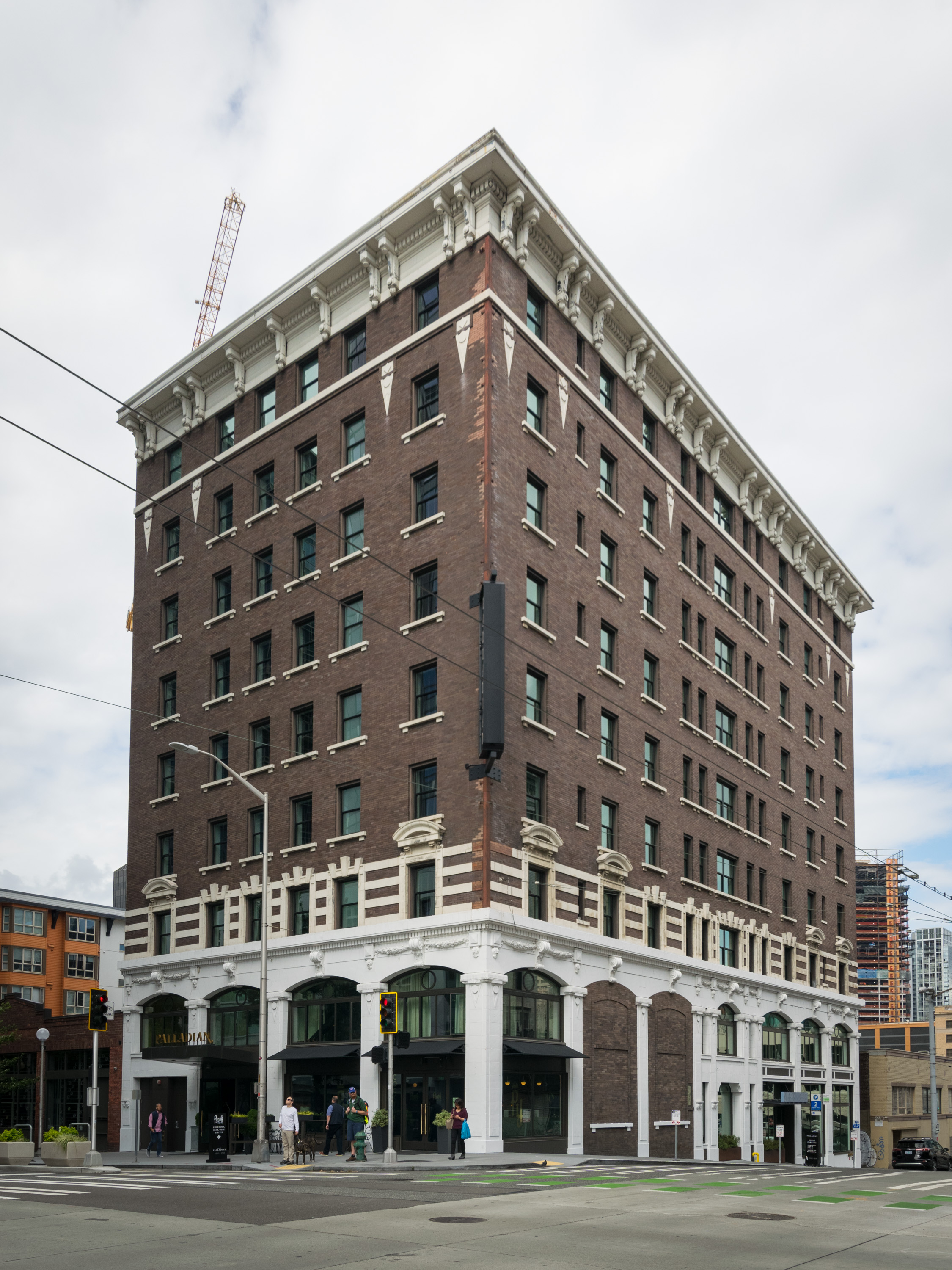
- Calhoun Hotel in 2018

- Location within Downtown Seattle
- Location: 2000 2nd Ave. Seattle, Washington
- Coordinates: 47°36′43″N 122°20′30″W
- Built: 1909
- Architect: William P. White
- Architectural style: Beaux Arts
- NRHP reference No.: 13000208
- Added to NRHP: 2013-04-23

The Calhoun Hotel, later known as the Palladian Apartments and currently the Kimpton Palladian Hotel is a historic hotel building located in downtown Seattle, Washington. Constructed in 1909, The building was built on the recently regraded northeast corner of Second Avenue and Virginia Streets by Scott Calhoun (1874-1952), a well known attorney and Seattle's Corporation Counsel who helped form the Port of Seattle. He commissioned prominent local Architect W. P. White to design an eight-story hotel building, containing 153 rooms on the upper floors and retail at ground level. It was the first building to be completed on the site of the Denny Regrade. It was listed on the National Register of Historic Places on April 23, 2013. Converted to apartments by the 1980s, In 2014 it was restored back into a hotel and is currently run by the Kimpton Hotels & Restaurants brand as the Kimpton Palladian Hotel.

== History ==
Scott Calhoun was born in Port Townsend, Washington, in 1874, one of nine children to Dr. & Mrs. George Villars Calhoun, who came to Washington State in 1865 from New Brunswick, Canada via Maine. The family first settled in Port Angeles to take charge of the Marine Hospital, which George soon relocated back to Port Townsend, where it and the customs house had been forcibly removed from several years before. The family moved to Seattle in 1876 where George opened a private practice in Pioneer Square. In 1879 the family relocated again to La Conner where they all remained until returning to a very different Seattle in 1896.

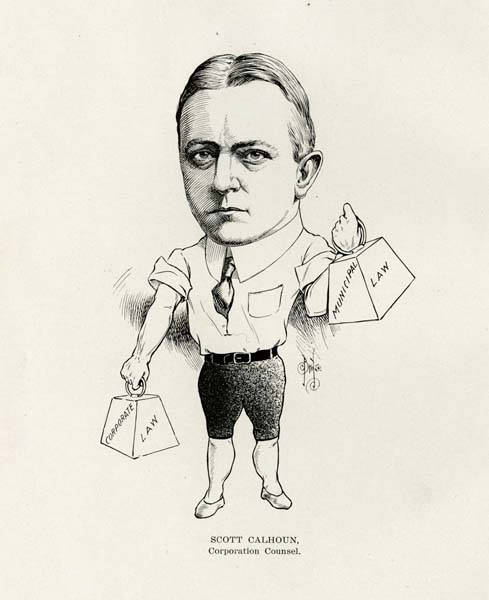
Scott Calhoun, 1906

Meanwhile, the young Scott Calhoun had gone to California to study law at the new Stanford University where he was among the first class to graduate in 1892. He would spend the next few years going back and forth between Seattle and San Francisco, establishing a law office in the Starr-Boyd Building on First Avenue. Spurred on by accounts of the Klondike Gold Rush from his brother, Scott returned to Seattle for good and soon began acquiring real estate in the city as well as pursuing an attorney position in city government. He was appointed City Tax Attorney in 1904 and by 1905 was named city Corporation Counsel where he proved himself as an influential and popular public speaker. In this position he became involved in many of the ordinances surrounding the multiple regrading and rezoning projects happening around the city at the time, affecting thousands of properties in the city, including his own.

In 1909 Calhoun commissioned noted local architect William P. White to design an 8-story, $150,000 hotel for his property at the Northeast corner of 2nd Avenue and Virginia Street, in an area recently leveled by the Denny Regrade and poised to become the new heart of Seattle's commercial core. White's design was for a restrained Beaux Arts building composed of dark red brick, trimmed with white terra cotta and crowned by a projecting metal cornice. A building permit was issued in May 1909 and construction began immediately by contractor Sherman G. Combs. The McClintic-Marshall Construction Company under the direction of engineer C.F. Boyce was in charge of fabricating the hotel's 375-ton steel frame. The Denny-Renton Clay and Coal Company provided the building's external cladding. With construction wrapping up by early 1910, Calhoun's building was the first new building completed in the Denny Regrade neighborhood. Despite the building's completion, the hotel itself didn't open until October 1910 under lease to Lillie B. Wisner, previously the manager of the Hotel Stander. The new hotel boasted 153 rooms for short-term and long-term guests with hardwood finish throughout and tiled bathrooms.

Within a month of opening, Calhoun sold the hotel to the Interlaken Land Company for $265,000 as well as $160,000 worth of lots in the company's new subdivision near today's Interlaken Park, which he turned around and sold for quick profit. By 1912, management of the hotel was taken over by veteran caterer Joseph Guerrieri, who overhauled the cafe, turning the hotel into a social destination for guest speakers, tea parties, masquerade dances and book clubs. The hotel remained a popular gathering place through a succession of managers throughout the 1910s and 1920s.

In 1928 part of the mezzanine level in the lobby was remodeled into a suite of studios for radio Station KVL which sent out its first broadcast on June 22 with a dedication address by governor Roland H. Hartley.

By the 1980s the Hotel was exclusively apartments and in 1984 it was bought by Palladian Associates, who changed the name to the Palladian Apartments, apparently inspired by the Palladian windows on the building's mezzanine level. In 2014 the current owners undertook an entire restoration and conversion of the building back into a hotel, though keeping the Palladian name. The 97-room Palladian Hotel is currently run by the Kimpton Hotels & Restaurants brand.

== See also ==
- National Register of Historic Places listings in Seattle
