= Shafer Building =

Building in Seattle, Washington, U.S.

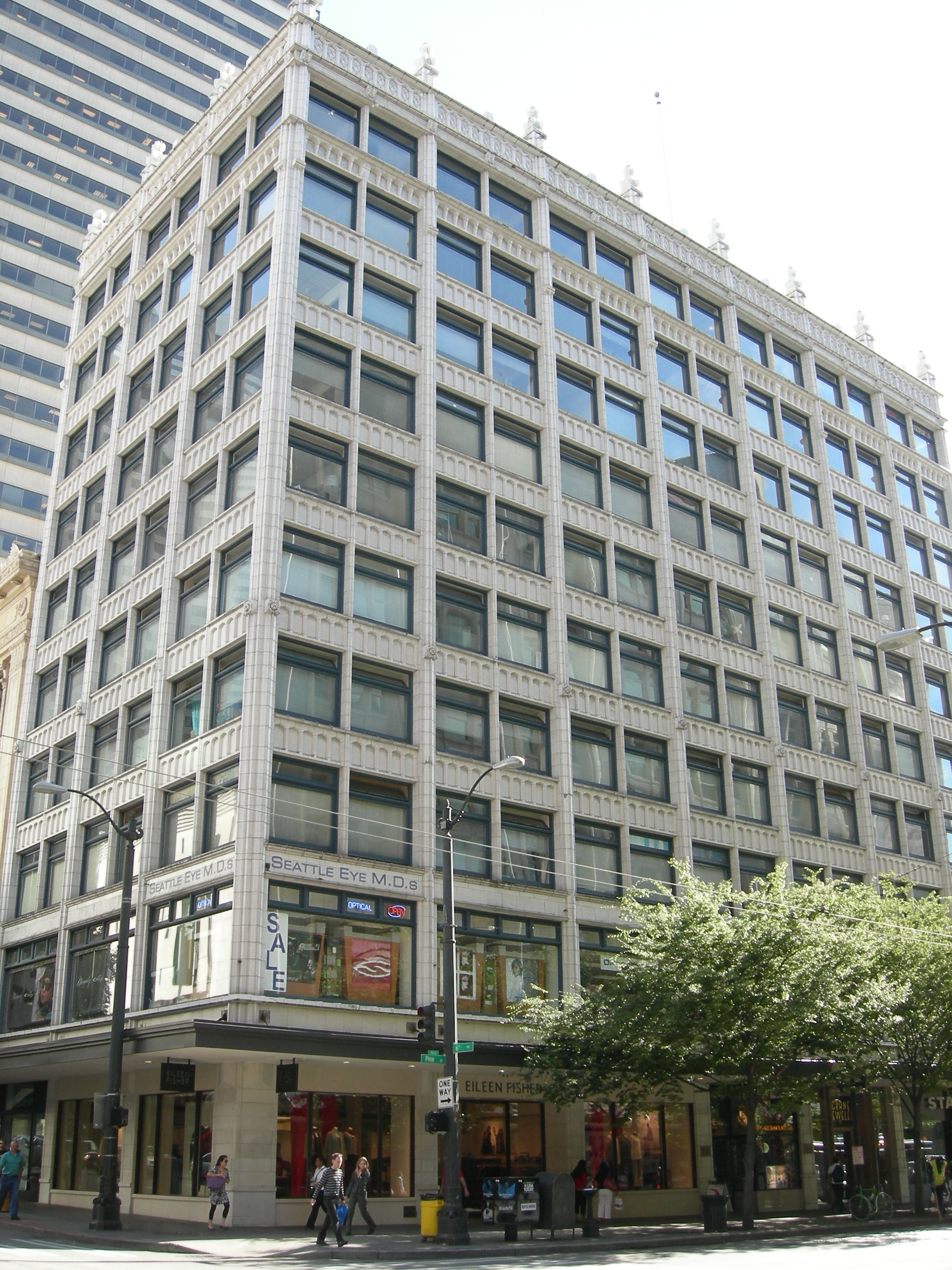
- The building's exterior in 2007
- Interactive map of the Shafer Building area

General information
- Location: Seattle, Washington, United States
- Coordinates: 47°36′43″N 122°20′8″W

The Shafer Building, also known as the Sixth and Pine Building, is a historic building in downtown Seattle, in the U.S. state of Washington. The structure is listed on the National Register of Historic Places.

== See also ==
- National Register of Historic Places listings in Seattle
