= Fremont Building =

Building in Seattle, Washington, U.S.

- U.S. National Register of Historic Places
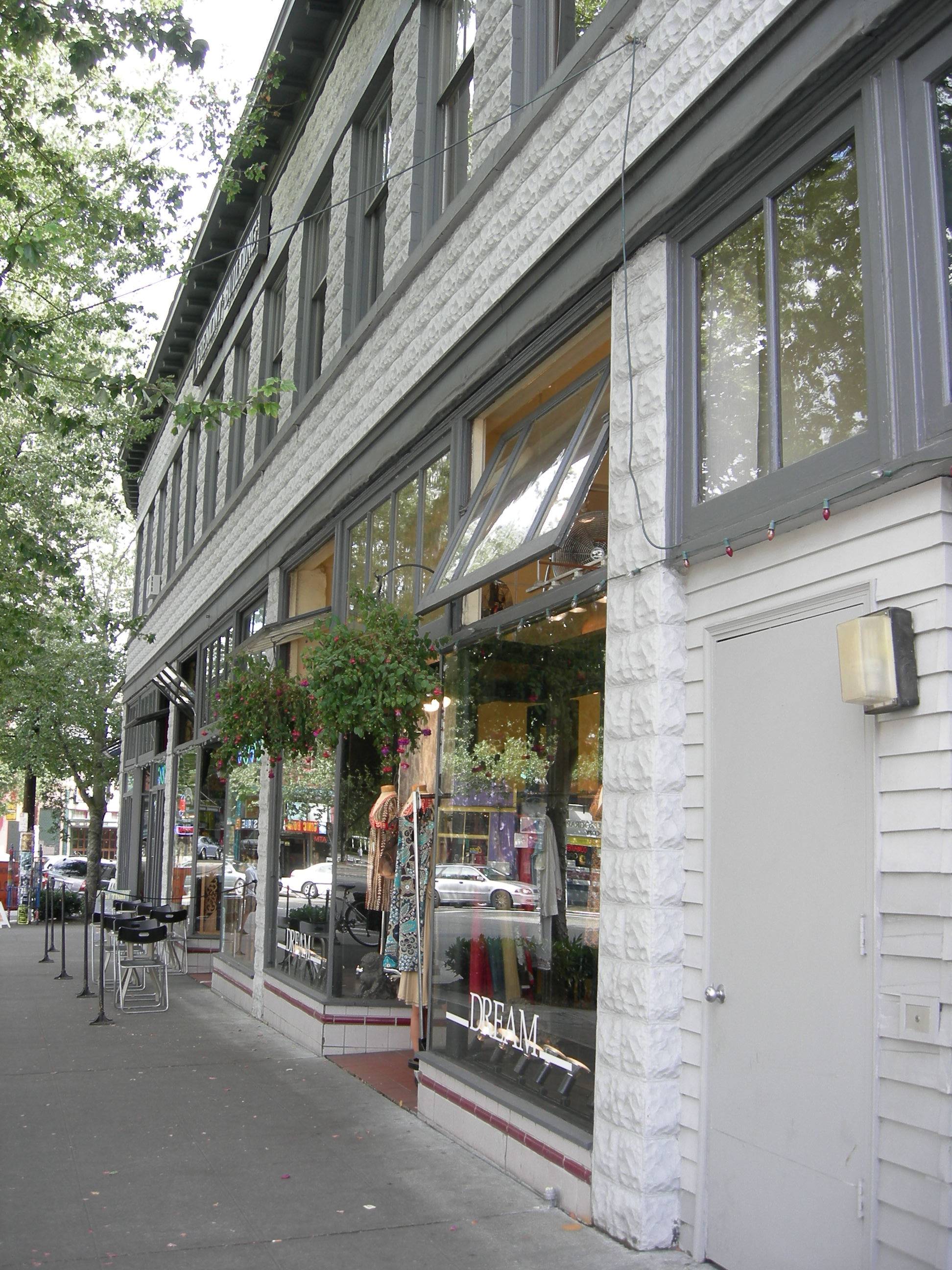
- Building exterior in 2007
- Location: Seattle, Washington, U.S.
- Coordinates: 47°39′0.96″N 122°21′0.23″W
- Built: 1911
- Architectural style: Revival
- NRHP reference No.: 92001587
- Added to NRHP: November 12, 1992

The Fremont Building, also known as the Remsberg Building, is a historic commercial building located at 3419 Fremont Avenue North in Seattle, Washington. The two-story building, built in the late 19th and 20th century Revival style, was completed in 1911 and added to the National Register of Historic Places on November 12, 1992. Originally built as a hotel with office space and ground floor retail, the building currently houses offices and retail including an antique mall in the basement.

== History ==
The building's original owner was lawyer-turned-superior court judge and pioneer Fremont resident Charles E. Remsberg (1864-1945). He was one of the most vocal supporters of the Lake Washington Ship canal and as well as serving as Port Commissioner would later help establish the Fremont State Bank directly across the street. In 1901 he built the first Fremont Hotel, a two story wood frame building, at the southwest corner of Fremont Avenue and N 35th Street, then known as Blewett Street. In June 1903 a fire started on the block, destroying several buildings and severely damaging the hotel, at that time occupied on the ground floor by the Smart & Ainslie print shop and Peterson's paint shop & fruit stand. Pennell & Co.'s new and used furniture store, occupying a detached 2-story building to the south also owned by Remsberg, received heavy damage as well. The building was quickly rebuilt in much the same way it was. An annex would be added to the West side of the building in 1907, adding 50 hotel rooms.

In 1911, plans were made by the city to build a new street (Fremont Place) connecting Fremont Avenue and N 36th Street that would bisect the block between 35th and 36th Street and give traffic a more gradual curve on their way to and from Ballard. Remsberg's property was in the path of the new street and he would lose most of his corner building. In May of that year he commissioned architects Josenhans & Allan to largely rebuild the Fremont hotel to maximize the remaining land. While still essentially a wood-frame building, the street facade would be clad in concrete blocks with a pressed tin cornice, giving the building a more permanent appearance. The $20,000 building contained 6 store rooms on the ground floor and office space above. The Fremont Hotel would continue to occupy the 1907 annex as well as a wing behind the office building containing 36 rooms total.

The building remained under Remsberg's ownership until November 1918 when it was sold at auction by the Fremont State Bank. The building today retains most of its original architecture, even down to the original wood frame storefront windows. The 1907 annex has since been reduced to a single floor but retains the original Beaux-Arts style architrave entrance, once the main entrance to the hotel.

== See also ==
- National Register of Historic Places listings in Seattle, Washington
