= James Frederick Dawson =

American landscape architect

James Frederick Dawson (1874–1941) was an American landscape architect. His father, Jackson Thornton Dawson, was superintendent of the Arnold Arboretum, and Dawson himself was actually born in the arboretum. Dawson graduated from Harvard University in 1896 and joined the Olmsted Brothers landscape design firm, where he led many significant commissions. He became a full partner in 1922.
