= Suen King and Sue Fong Eng House =

- U.S. National Register of Historic Places
- The Suen King and Sue Fong End House in 2026
- Location: 611 8th Avenue South, Seattle, Washington
- Built: 1937
- Part of: Wing Luke Museum
- NRHP reference No.: 100013175
- Added to NRHP: June 22, 2026

The Suen King and Sue Fong End House, also known as the Eng Family Homestead, is a single story home listed on the National Register of Historic Places.

It was built in 1937 by Suen King and Sue Fong Eng, and put in the name of their American-born son to get around the 1882 Chinese Exclusion Act, which barred Chinese born immigrants from owning property. The property was bought by the Wing Luke Museum in 2021 for restoration.
