= U.S. Immigrant Station and Assay Office =

- U.S. National Register of Historic Places
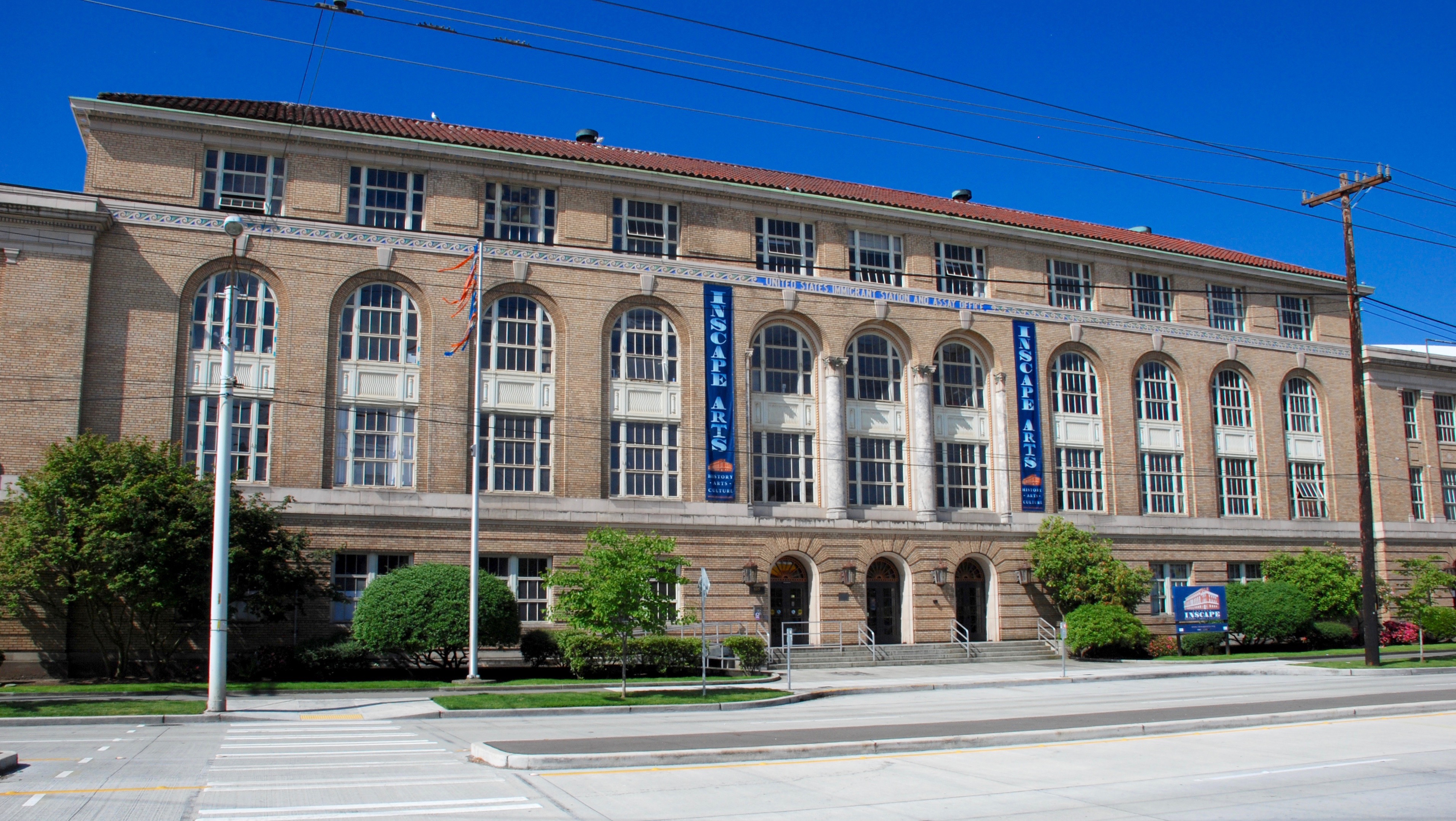
- US Immigrant Station and Assay Office Seattle, now Inscape, in 2014.

- Location within Washington (state) Location within the United States
- Location: 815 Airport Way, S., Seattle, Washington
- Coordinates: 47°35′42.5″N 122°19′37.4″W
- Area: 1.2 acres (0.49 ha)
- Built: 1929
- Architectural style: Neo-Classic
- NRHP reference No.: 79002542
- Added to NRHP: January 1, 1979

The U.S. Immigrant Station and Assay Office Seattle is a four-story neoclassical style building located at 815 Airport Way South in Seattle, Washington. It opened in 1932 as an immigration detention and processing station and assay office. It is now known as Inscape Arts, and houses approximately 125 artists, craftspeople, studios, non-profit organizations, and a Shakespearean theater company.

In its early life, the building was used mostly to enforce the Chinese Exclusion Act. The top floor housed assay operations until 1955. The building closed as an immigration and detention center in 2004, when the Northwest Detention Center opened in Tacoma. It was sold to investors in 2008 for $4.4 million, and reopened as Inscape Arts in 2010 after renovations.

The Wing Luke Museum’s permanent exhibition Voices of the Immigration Station includes placards and other interpretive material throughout the building.
