= Alaska Trade Building =

- U.S. National Register of Historic Places
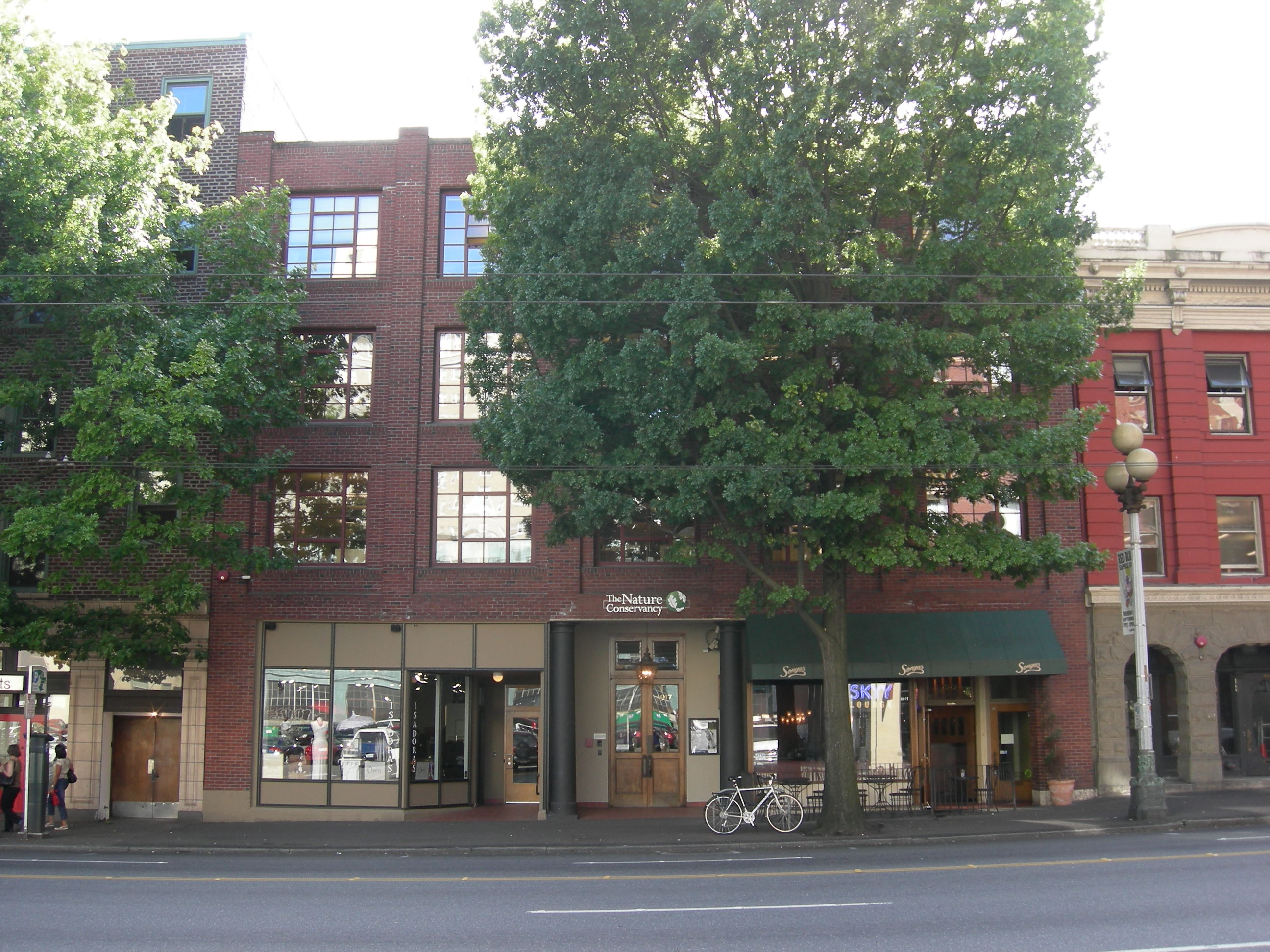

- Location within Downtown Seattle
- Location: Seattle, Washington
- Coordinates: 47°36′37.57″N 122°20′31.67″W
- Built: 1909
- Architect: John O. Taft
- Architectural style: Industrial
- NRHP reference No.: 71000871
- Added to NRHP: May 6, 1971

The Alaska Trade Building, also known as the Union Record Building and the Steele Building, is a historic building in Seattle, Washington located on First Avenue near the Pike Place Market. Built in 1909, it was one of the first reinforced steel, concrete and brick buildings in the area and was advertised as being completely fireproof. The building is historically associated with the country's only Union-owned daily newspaper, The Seattle Union Record and is listed on the National Register of Historic Places. The Butterworth Building, another National Register property, neighbors it to the north.

== History ==
The Alaska Trade Building was built by brick & tile manufacturer James H. Steele in 1909, replacing a two-story wooden building known as the 'Rose Block' that pre-dated the Great Seattle fire. Steele commissioned architect John O. Taft whose original plans published in the Seattle Times in March 1909 called for an eight-story hotel building trimmed in Granite and Terra cotta that would cost $135,000 and be built in 2 phases. Ultimately only the first four floors were ever built; what was completed was largely unadorned and besides the configuration of the windows and the 2 doric columns flanking the ground floor entrance the building bore no resemblance to the original plans. In late 1910, the unfinished building was purchased from Steele for $150,000 by Portland, Oregon developers J.O. Storey and Thomas Lavake, who converted the building into open loft space. It was briefly known as the Storey Building during this time before reverting back to the Steele Building. The building was purchased by the Central Labor Council and the local Trade Union in 1915.

The Seattle Union Record was established as a weekly paper in 1910 by the Central Labor Council. The council's secretary, E.B. "Harry" Ault, became editor in 1912 and would expand the paper to a daily in 1918. Under Ault's leadership, the paper grew from a circulation of 3,000 to 50,000 to over 112,000 in 1919. Seeking larger quarters, the paper was moved into the Alaska Trade Building in 1921.

When Dave Beck took control of the Central Labor Council, he sold the paper to Ault in 1924. The paper ceased publication in 1928 but would see a brief resurrection during the Seattle Times and Seattle Post-Intelligencer strikes in 2000.

The building's third floor is currently home to the office of Ecotope, Inc.
