= Fire Station No. 18 (Seattle) =

- U.S. National Register of Historic Places
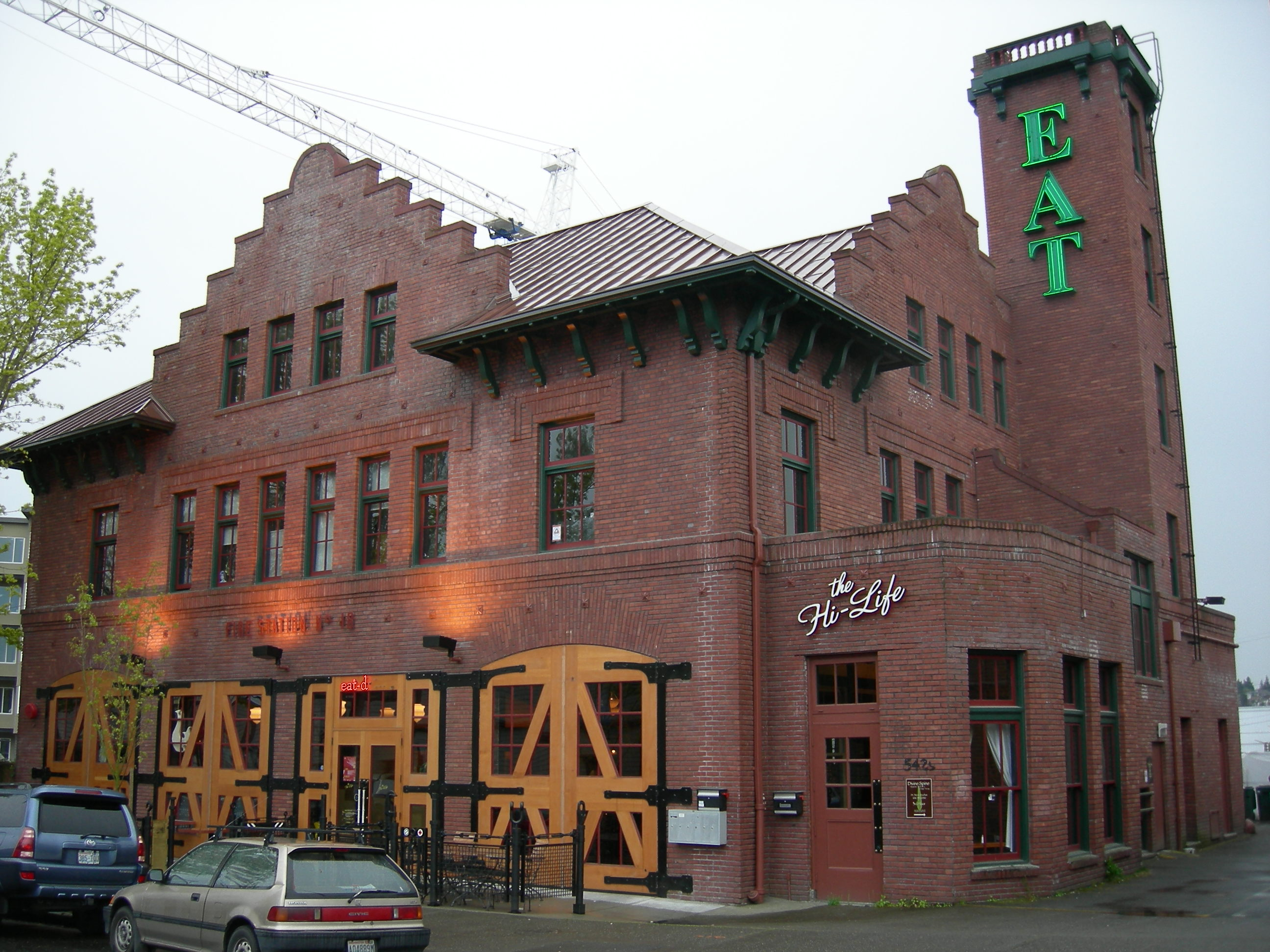
- Ballard Firehouse, 2007

- Location within Washington (state)
- Location: 5427 Russell Ave., NW, Seattle, Washington
- Coordinates: 47°40′7″N 122°22′54″W
- Area: less than one acre
- Built: 1911
- Architect: Bebb & Mendel
- NRHP reference No.: 73001876
- Added to NRHP: June 19, 1973

Fire Station No. 18 (also known as the Ballard Firehouse) was a fire station located in the Ballard neighborhood of Seattle, Washington listed on the National Register of Historic Places. Since 2024, it has been occupied by Fuego Restaurant and Lounge, a Latin American restaurant and nightclub.

== See also ==
- List of landmarks in Seattle
- List of National Historic Landmarks in Washington (state)
- National Register of Historic Places listings in Seattle
