= List of Seattle landmarks =

The Seattle Landmarks Preservation Board, part of the Department of Neighborhoods of the city of Seattle, Washington, United States, designates city landmarks. According to the department's official website, the following are designated landmarks; the list should be complete as of September 7, 2021.

All designated landmarks are added to chapter 25.32 of the Seattle municipal code and are approved via legislative action from the Seattle City Council.

See also list of designated Historic Districts.

== Seattle landmarks ==
Name	Location	Image	Date listed	Description
1101 East Pike Street	1101 E. Pike Street; 47.61392°N 122.31791°W		July 15, 2020	Built in 1916 for the Seattle Automobile Company, one of Seattle's first car dealers.
1411 Fourth Avenue Building	1411 Fourth Avenue	More images	October 23, 1989(114771)	
1411 Boylston Avenue	1411 Boylston Avenue		February 19, 2025	
1st Avenue Groups/Waterfront Center	multiple addresses		February 19, 1981	Also known as "First Avenue Groups". The city's documentation of the extent of this Landmark designation is a bit unclear with respect to two out of seven original buildings. The Department of Neighborhoods alphabetical listing does not entirely agree with the original landmark designation LPB-49/81.
777 Thomas Street	777 Thomas Street	More images	June 15, 2014 (124501)	Designed by prolific Seattle architect George W. Stoddard and built in 1931 as an Art Deco auto repair shop.
Admiral's House	2001 W. Garfield Street	More images	March 11, 2013 (124135)	
Admiral Theater	2343 California Avenue S.W. 47°34′54″N 122°23′12″W	More images	December 13, 1993 (116972)	
Ainsworth & Dunn Warehouse	2815 Elliott Avenue		July 1, 2019 (125853)	Two-story brick warehouse. (The ground floor was later retrofitted for use as an Old Spaghetti Factory restaurant, in operation from 1970 to 2016.)
Alexander Hall	315 West Bertona Street	More images	February 18, 2014 (124424)	Part of Seattle Pacific University and the first building built on the campus.
American Can Company Building	2601 Elliott Avenue	More images	December 17, 2025	Completed in 1924 and located in Belltown, the structure is noted for its reinforced concrete construction and historical significance to Seattle's early fishing industry.
American Meter and Appliance	1001 Westlake Ave N		May 3, 2017	
Anhalt Apartment Building	1005 E. Roy Street	more images	December 24, 1979 (108731)	
Anhalt Apartment Building	1014 E. Roy Street		May 14, 1979 (108227)	
Anhalt Apartment Building	1600 E. John Street		July 22, 2013 (124236)	
Anhalt Hall	711 NE 43rd Street		November 19, 2018 (125674)	
Ankeny-Gowey House	912 2nd Avenue. W	More images	June 13, 2011 (123625)	
Arboretum Aqueduct	Lake Washington Boulevard E. at E. Foster Island Road; 47°38′33″N 122°17′52″W	More images	December 13, 1976 (106070)	
Arctic Building	306 Cherry Street; 47°36′13″N 122°19′55″W	More images	December 13, 1993 (116969)	
Avon Apartments / Capitol Crest Apartments	1831-35 Broadway Avenue			
B. F. Day School	3921 Linden Avenue N.	More images		
Ballard Carnegie Library	2026 NW Market Street; 47°40′8″N 122°23′0″W	More images	July 22, 2013 (124227)	
Ballard/Howe House	22 W. Highland Drive	More images	May 14, 1979 (108226)	
Bank of America Building / Seattle First National Bank Building	566 Denny Way		January 12, 2023 (126749)	
Bank of California Building / Puget Sound Bank	815 2nd Avenue; 47°36′15″N 122°20′4″W			
Barksdale House	13226 42nd Avenue		August 5, 2013 (124244)	
Barnes Building	2320 First Avenue	More images	October 23, 1978 (107754)	
Baroness Apartments	1005 Spring Street	More images	November 30, 2010 (123487)	
Battelle Talaris	4000 NE 41st Street	More images		
Beacon Hill First Baptist Church	1607 S. Forest Street		December 28, 1981 (110349)	
Beebe Building	1013 First Avenue	More images		Part of "1st Avenue Groups/Waterfront Center".
Bell Building	2326 First Avenue	More images	October 23, 1978 (107753)	
Belltown Cottages	2512, 2512A & 2516 Elliot Avenue	More images	July 14, 2003 (121220)	
Belroy Apartments	703 Bellevue Avenue E.	More images	April 9, 2012 (123857)	
Ben Bridge Jewelers Street Clock	409 Pike Street	More images		
Benton's Jewelers Street Clock	3216 N.E. 45th Street	More images		
Bethany Presbyterian Church (Seattle, Washington)	1818 Queen Anne Avenue N.	More images	April 21, 1986 (112801)	
Black Manufacturing Building	1130 Rainier Avenue S.		September 8, 1987 (113601)	
Black Property	1319 12th Ave S.	More images	December 28, 1981 (110353)	
Blackford Hall	1200 Terry Avenue	More images		Part of Virginia Mason Medical Center
Bleitz Funeral Home	316 Florentia St.		(126017)	
Bloss House	4055 SW Holgate St.		February 10, 2020; March 26, 2012 (123846)	
Bon Marché	300 Pine Street	More images	October 16, 1989 (114772)	
Bon Marché Stables	2315 Western Ave		June 4, 2009 (122995)	
Bordeaux House	806 14th Avenue E	More images		
Boren Investment Company Warehouse	334 Boren Ave N.	More images	June 13, 2014 (124494)	
Bowen/Huston Bungalow	715 W. Prospect Street	More images	September 10, 1984 (111887)	
Bower/Bystrom House	1022 Summit Avenue E.		May 14, 1979 (108214)	
Boyer/Lambert House	1617 Boyer Avenue E.		February 22, 1983 (111021)	
Brace/Moriarty House	170 Prospect Street		December 22, 1980 (109586)	
Brasa Building / Metropolitan Printing Press	2107 Third Ave.		September 5, 2014 (124550)	
Brehm Brothers Houses	219 & 221 36th Avenue E.		December 24, 1979 (108734)	
Bressi Garage	226 First Ave N	Upload image	April 17, 2018 (125643)	
Bricklayers Building	318 Fairview Ave N	Upload image		
Brill Trolley			August 21, 1978 (107621)	
Broad Street Substation	319 6th Ave N		(125783)	
Brooklyn Building	1222 2nd Avenue		September 29, 1986 (113088)	
Bryant Elementary School	3311 N.E. 60th Street	More images	September 16, 2002 (120916)	
Burwell House	709 14th Avenue E.	More images	April 16, 2025	
C.H. Black House & Gardens	615 W. Lee Street		April 16, 1990 (115036)	
California Avenue Substation (now Dakota Place Park)	4304 S.W. Dakota Street	More images	June 13, 2011 (123624)	
Camlin Hotel	1619 9th Avenue	More images	January 6, 1999 (119470)	Designed in the Jacobethan style of architecture and opened on October 31, 1926, this hotel derives its name from the building's developers, Adolph Linden and Edmund Campbell.
Campbell Building	4554 California Ave SW			
Canterbury Court	4225 Brooklyn Avenue NE			
Capitol Hill United Methodist Church; Also known as First Methodist Protestant Church of Seattle	128 16th Avenue E.	More images		
Carmack House	1522 E. Jefferson			Demolished April 28, 2015
Caroline Horton House	627 14th Avenue E			Caroline Horton House Landmark Nomination
Cassel Crag Apartments	1218 Terry Avenue	More images		
Castle Apartments	2132 2nd Ave			
Cayton Revels House	518 14th Ave E	More images		
Carroll's Jewelers Street Clock	1427 4th Avenue	More images		Now at MOHAI, South Lake Union.
Cedar Park Elementary School	13224 37th Ave NE			
Center for Wooden Boats floating buildings	1010 Valley Street	More images		
Central Building	810 Third Ave			
Century Square Street Clock	1529 4th Avenue			
Century 21 Coliseum / Climate Pledge Arena	305 Harrison St	more images		Also known for many years as the KeyArena
Chamber of Commerce Building	215 Columbia Street.	More images		
Central Waterfront Piers		More images		Often grouped as one landmark, this is actually five separate landmarks, each with its own ordinance designating it as such
Central Waterfront Piers	Pier 54 - 1001 Alaskan Way	More images	April 13, 2012 (123859)	
Central Waterfront Piers	Pier 55 - 1101 Alaskan Way	More images	April 13, 2012 (123860)	
Central Waterfront Piers	Pier 56 - 1201 Alaskan Way	More images	April 13, 2012 (123858)	
Central Waterfront Piers	Pier 57 - 1301 Alaskan Way	More images	April 13, 2012 (123861)	
Central Waterfront Piers	Pier 59 - 1415 Alaskan Way	More images	April 13, 2012 (123862)	
Charles Bussell House (Eastman/Jacobsen)	1630 36th Avenue			
Charles P. Dose House	2121 31st Ave S	More images		
Cheasty Boulevard South		More images		
Chelsea Apartment Building; Originally Chelsea Family Hotel	620 W. Olympic Place	More images		
Chiarelli-Dore House	843 NE 100th Street	More images		
Chinese Community Bulletin Board	511 7th Avenue S.			
Church of the Blessed Sacrament and Rectory	5041 9th Avenue N.E.	More images	April 16, 1980 (109732)	Catholic parish, run by Dominican friars
Cleveland High School	5511 15th Avenue S.	More images		
Coca-Cola Bottling Plant	1313 E. Columbia St.			
Coliseum Theater	N.E. corner of 5th Avenue & Pike Street	More images		
Coleman Building	94-96 Spring Street	More images		Part of "1st Avenue Groups/Waterfront Center". Façade incorporated into the Watermark Tower.
Colman Building	801-821 First Avenue	More images		
Colman School	2300 S Massachusetts St	More images	(122950)	
Colonnade Hotel/Gatewood Apartments	107 Pine St	More images		
Colonial Hotel	1119 First Avenue	More images		Part of "1st Avenue Groups/Waterfront Center".
Community Psychiatric / Bush Roed & Hitchings Office	2009 Minor Ave E			
Considine House	802 16th Avenue	More images		
Concord Elementary School	723 S. Concord Street	More images		
Cooper House	225-227 14th Avenue E.			
Cooper School	4408 Delridge Way S.W.	More images		
Cotterill House	2501 Westview Drive W.			
Cowen Park Bridge	15th Avenue N.E. between Cowen Place N.E. and N.E. 62nd Street	More images		
Crescent-Hamm Building	4302 SW Alaska St	More images	March 22, 2018 (125522)	
Daniel Bagley School	7821 Stone Ave N			
Daniel Webster School	3014 NW 67th St	More images		Later Nordic Heritage Museum
Dearborn House	1117 Minor Avenue	More images		
Decatur Building	1521 6th Avenue	More images		
De la Mar Apartment Building	115 W. Olympic Place	More images		
Denny's Restaurant / Manning's Cafeteria (Demolished)	N.W. Market Street & 15th Avenue N.W.			
Dexter Horton Building	710 2nd Avenue	More images		
Donahoe Building / Bergman Luggage	1901 - 1911 3rd Avenue			
Douglass–Truth Library	2300 E. Yesler Way	More images		
Doyle Building / J.S. Graham Store	119 Pine Street	More images		
Dr. Annie Russell House	5721 8th Avenue NE			
Drake House	6414 22nd Avenue N.W.			
Dunlap Elementary School	8621 48th Avenue S.			
Duwamish Railroad Bridge	Railroad lines south of the Spokane Street Bridge over Duwamish Waterway	More images		
E.C. Hughes School	7740 34th Ave SW	More images		
Eagles Temple Building/ACT Theater	1416 7th Avenue	More images		
East Pine Substation	1501 23rd Ave			
East Republican Street Stairway	Between Melrose Avenue E. and Bellevue Avenue E.			
Eastern Hotel	506 1/2 Maynard Avenue S.			
Egan House	1500 Lakeview Blvd.	More images		
Eitel Building	1501 2nd Avenue	More images		
El Monterey	4204 11th Avenue NE	More images		
El Rio Apartments	1922–1928 9th Avenue	More images		
Eldridge Tire Company Building	1519 Broadway	More images		
Ellsworth Storey Historic Cottages Group	1706–1816 Lake Washington Boulevard S. and 1725–1729 36th Avenue S.	More images		
Ellsworth Storey Houses	260 and 270 Dorffel Drive E.	More images		
Emerson Elementary School	9709 S. 60th Street	More images		
Epiphany Chapel	3719 E. Denny Way	More images		
Exchange Building	821 2nd Avenue	More images		
Excursion Boat Virginia V	860 Terry Ave N	More images	March 14, 1977 (106278)	
Fairmount Park School	3800 SW Findlay Street	More images		
Fashioncraft Building/Recovery Cafe	2022 Boren Avenue			
Fauntleroy Community Church and YMCA	9260 California Avenue S.W.	More images		
Federal Reserve Bank of San Francisco	1015 2nd Avenue	More images		
Fir Lodge / Alki Homestead Restaurant	2727 61st Avenue S.W.	More images		
Fire Station #2	2318 4th Avenue	More images		
Fire Station #3 (Old Firehouse #3)	301 Terry Avenue	More images		
Fire Station #5	925 Alaskan Way	More images		
Fire Station #6	101 23rd Avenue	More images		
Fire Station #13	3601 Beacon Avenue S.	More images		
Fire Station #14	3224 4th Avenue S.	More images		
Fire Station #16	6846 Oswego Place N.E.	More images		
Fire Station #17	1010 N.E. 50th Street	More images		
Fire Station #18 (Old Firehouse #18)	5427 Russell Avenue N.W.	More images		
Fire Station #23 (Old Firehouse #23)	722 18th Avenue S.	More images		
Fire Station #25 (Old Firehouse #25)	1400 Harvard Avenue	More images		
Fire Station #33	10235 62nd Avenue S.		December 21, 1976	
Fire Station #37	7302 34th Avenue S.W.	More images		
Fire Station #38	5503 33rd Avenue N.E.	More images		
Fire Station #41	2416 34th Avenue W.	More images		
Fireboat Duwamish		More images		
First African Methodist Episcopal Church	1522 14th Avenue	More images	August 20, 1980	Its founding in 1885 established the first black mission in Seattle.
First Avenue Groups / Waterfront Center	1001–1123 First Avenue, 94-96 Spring Street, and 1006–1024 Western Avenue	More images		
First Church of Christ Scientist	1519 E. Denny Way	More images	January 17, 1977	The structure is noted for its neo-classic design, interior details, and superior craftsmanship.
First Covenant Church	1500 Bellevue Ave	More images		
First United Methodist Church	811 5th Ave	More images		
Fischer Studio Building	1519 Third Avenue			
Fisher-Howell House	2819 Franklin Avenue E.			
Fitch/Nutt House	4401 Phinney Avenue N.			
Flatiron Building, also known as Triangle Hotel and Bar	551 First Avenue S.	More images		
Ford Assembly Plant Building	1155 Valley Street	More images		
Fort Lawton Chapel	3801 W. Government Way			
Fort Lawton Landmark District: Administrative Building, Band and Barracks, Civil Employees' Quarters, Guard House, Post Exchange and Gymnasium Building, Quartermaster's Stable	3801 W. Government Way	More images		
Fourteenth Avenue West Group	2000–2016 14th Avenue W.	More images		
Frances Skinner Edris Nurses Home	2120 1st Ave N		December 20, 2018 (125744)	Landmark nomination
Franklin Apartments	2302 4th Ave			
Franklin High School	3013 S. Mt. Baker Boulevard	More images		
Frederick & Nelson Building (now Nordstrom)	500-524 Pine Street	More images		
Freeway Park	700 Seneca Street	More images	May 2022	
Fremont Bridge	4th Avenue N. and Fremont Avenue N. over Lake Washington Ship Canal	More images		
Fremont Hotel	3421-3429 Fremont Avenue N.	More images		
Fremont Library	1731 N. 35th Street	More images		
Fremont Trolley Barn / Red Hook Ale Brewery	3400 Phinney Avenue N.			
Galbraith House / Seattle Mental Health	1729 17th Avenue			
Garfield High School	400 23rd Avenue	More images		
Gas Works Park		More images		
Gaslight Inn	1727 15th Avenue	More images		
Gatewood School	4320 S.W. Myrtle Street	More images		
George Washington Memorial Bridge / Aurora Bridge	Aurora Avenue N. over Lake Washington Ship Canal	More images		
Georgetown City Hall	6202 13th Avenue S.	More images		
Georgetown Steam Plant Pump Station	7551 8th Avenue South	More images		(on Duwamish River)
Georgetown Steam Plant	6511 Ellis Avenue S.	More images		
German House	613 9th Avenue	More images		formerly United States Assay Office
Gibbs House	1000 Warren Avenue N.			
Globe Building	1005 First Avenue	More images		Part of "1st Avenue Groups/Waterfront Center".
Golden Gardens Bath House	8001 Seaview Avenue N.W.	More images		
Good Shepherd Center	4647 Sunnyside Avenue N.	More images		
Grand Pacific Hotel	1115 First Avenue	More images		Part of "1st Avenue Groups/Waterfront Center".
Great American Food and Beverage Co. Street Clock	3119 Eastlake Avenue E.			Great American Food and Beverage Co. became Lake Union Cafe and has been strictly a catering venue for at least a decade. Clock was knocked over by a truck some time after 2006.
Great Northern Building	1404 4th Avenue	More images		
Green Lake Library	7364 E. Greenlake Drive N.			
Greenwood Jewelers Street Clock	129 N. 85th Street	More images		
Griffin Building	2005 Fifth Ave			
Guiry Hotel	2101–2105 1/2 First Avenue			
Hainsworth / Gordon House	2657 37th Avenue S.W.		March 11, 1981 (109734)	
Hamilton Middle School	1610 N 41st St			
Handschy / Kistler House	2433 9th Avenue W.			
Harborview Medical Center (Center Wing of East Hospital)	325 Ninth Avenue	More images		
Harvard Mansion	2706 Harvard Avenue E.			
Hat n' Boots	6910 E. Marginal Way S. (now moved to Oxbow Park)	More images		
Hay School	2100 4th Avenue N.			
Hebrew Academy / Old Forest Ridge Convent and Site	1617 Interlaken Drive E.	More images		
Hiawatha Playfield	2700 California Avenue S.W.	More images		
Highland Apartments	931 11th Ave E	More images	December 13, 2019 (126016)	
Hillcrest Apartment Building	1616 E. Howell Street	More images		
Hoge Building	705 2nd Avenue	More images		
Holyoke Building	107 Spring Street	More images		
Hong Kong and Shanghai Banking Co. Street Clock	720 2nd Avenue			Was at 703 3rd Avenue when it was landmarked.
Horace Mann School (Seattle)	2410 E Cherry Street			
Horiuchi Mural	Seattle Center	More images		
Hotel Cecil	1021 First Avenue	More images		Part of "1st Avenue Groups/Waterfront Center".
Hotel Elliott / Hahn Building	103 Pike Street			
Hull Building	2401–2405 First Avenue	More images		
Immaculate Conception Church	820 18th Avenue; 47.610049°N 122.30875°W	More images	January 10, 1977 (106142)	Built in 1904, the oldest extant Catholic church in Seattle; nomination drafted 1973.
Immanuel Lutheran Church	1215 Thomas Street	More images		
Ingraham High School	1819 N 135th St	More Images		
Italianate Victorian Pair	208 and 210 13th Avenue South			
J.W. Bullock House	1220 10th Ave E	More images	September 16, 2016 (125127)	
James W. Washington, Jr. Home and Studio	1816 26th Avenue			
Japanese Language School, also known as Nihon Go Gakko	1414 S. Weller Street	More images		
Jensen Block	601-611 Eastlake Avenue E.			
John B. Allen School	6532 Phinney Avenue N.			
Josephinum / New Washington Hotel	1902 2nd Avenue	More images		
Joshua Green Building	1425 4th Avenue	More images		
Judge Ronald House	421 30th Ave S	More images		
Kelly-Springfield Motor Truck Co. Building	1525 11th Avenue			
The Kenney (a.k.a. Kenney Seaview Building)	7125 Fauntleroy Way SW			
Kinnear Park	988 W. Olympic Place	More images		
Knights of Columbus Hall	700-722 East Union Street	More images		
Kobe Bell	Seattle Center	More images		
Kraus / Andersson House	2812 South Mount St. Helens Place	More images		
Kubota Gardens	9727 Renton Avenue S.	More images		
L'Amourita Apartment Building	2901–2917 Franklin Avenue E.			
La Quinta	1710 E. Denny Way	More images		
Lacey V. Murrow Memorial Bridge and East Portals of the Mount Baker Tunnels		Tunnel images Bridge images		
Lake City Library	12501 28th Avenue N.E.			
Lake Court Apartments	(2012 43rd Ave E	More images	December 18, 2024	
Lake City School	2611 NE 125th St.	More images		
Lake Union Steam Plant and Hydro House	1179 Eastlake Avenue E.	More images		
Lake Washington Bicycle Path	E. Interlaken Boulevard between Delmar Drive E. and 24th Avenue E.	More images		
Langston Hughes Cultural Arts Center	104 17th Avenue S.	More images		
Latona Hotel (Ace Hotel)	2419–2423 First Avenue			
Latona School	401 N.E. 42nd Street	More images		
1935 Building, Laurelhurst Community Center	4554 N.E. 41st Street	More images		
Leamington/Pacific Hotel and Apartments	317 Marion Street	More images		
Leona / Park Ridge Apartments	916 Queen Anne Avenue N.			
Liggett / Fourth and Pike Building	1424 Fourth Avenue	More images		
Lightship Relief / Swiftsure	Historic Ships Wharf, 860 Terry Avenue N.	More images		Under restoration since 2008; oldest U.S. lightship afloat and last with its original steam propulsion machinery
Lincoln High School	4400 Interlake Ave N	More images		
Lincoln Park / Lincoln Reservoir and Bobby Morris Playfield (now Cal Anderson Park)	1000 E. Pine Street	More images		
liq'ted (Licton) Springs Park	9536 Ashworth Ave. N, Seattle, WA 98103	More images	2019	
Lloyd Building	601 Stewart Street			
Log House Museum Building	3003 61st Avenue S.W.	More images		
Louisa Building	5220 20th Avenue N.W.			
Loyal Heights School	2501 NW 80th Street			
Lyon Building	607 3rd Avenue			
MV Malibu				
MV Thea Foss				
Madison Middle School	3429 45th Avenue S.W.	More images		
Magnolia Library	2801 34th Avenue W.			
Magnolia School	2418 28th Ave W			
Mama's Mexican Kitchen Building	2234 2nd Ave			Demolished late December 2024-early January 2025
Mann Building	1411 3rd Avenue			
Martha Washington School	6612 65th Avenue South			
Maryland Apartments	626 13th Avenue E.	More images		
McFee / Klockzien House	524 W. Highland Drive			
McGilvra School	1617 38th Avenue E	More images		
McGraw Square/Place	5th Avenue & Westlake Avenue	More images		
Medical Dental Building	509 Olive Way	More images		
Memorial Wall of Memorial Stadium	Seattle Center			
MGM Building	2331 Second Avenue			
Montlake Bridge and Montlake Cut	Montlake Boulevard E. between N.E. Pacific Street and E. Shelby Street	More images		
Montlake Community Center	1618 E. Calhoun Street			
Montlake School	2409 22nd Avenue E	More images		
Moore Mansion	811 14th Avenue E.			
Moore Theatre and Hotel Building	1932 2nd Avenue	More images		
Most Worshipful Prince Hall Grand Lodge	306 24th Ave S 47.60020°N 122.30084°W			Built in 1925. Originally "Rainier Masonic Temple".
Mount Baker Community Club Clubhouse	2815 Mount Rainier Dr S	More images	June 17, 2019 (125837)	
Mount Baker Presbyterian Church	3201 Hunter Boulevard S	More images		
Mount Zion Baptist Church	1634 Reverend Dr. S. McKinney Ave	More images	June 6, 2018 (125591)	
Myers Music Street Clock	Columbia City			Was at 1206 1st Avenue when it was landmarked.
Myron Ogden House	702 35th Avenue	More images		
North Queen Anne Drive Bridge	Over Wolf Creek Canyon	More images		
National Building	1018 Western Ave	More images		Part of "1st Avenue Groups/Waterfront Center".
Nathan Eckstein Junior High School	3003 N.E. 75th Street	More images		
Naval Reserve Armory	800 Terry Ave. N.	More images		
National Cash Register Building	1923 Fifth Avenue			
Nathan Eckstein Junior High School	3003 NE 75th St	More images		
Nelson/Steinbrueck House	2622 Franklin Avenue E.			
Neptune Building and Neptune Theatre	1303 NE 45th Street	More images		
New Age Christian Church	1763 N.W. 62nd Street	More images		
New Pacific Apartment Building	2600–2604 First Avenue			
New Richmond Laundry	224 Pontius Avenue N.	More images		
Nickel Apartments / Villa Camini	1205 NE 42nd Street		September 25, 2020 (126171)	
North East Library	6801 35th Avenue N.E.			
Norton Building	801 Second Avenue	More images		
Northwest Rooms and International Fountain Pavilion	Seattle Center			
Norvell House	3306 N.W. 71st Street	More images		
Old Broadway School (including Broadway Performance Hall of Seattle Central College)	Block bounded by Broadway, East Pine Street, Harvard Avenue and East Olive Street	More images		
Old Main Street School	307 6th Avenue S.			
Old Norway Hall	2015 Boren Avenue			
Olympic Tower (originally United Shopping Tower)	217 Pine Street	More images		
Olympic Warehouse and Cold Storage Building, also known as Agen Warehouse	1203–1207 Western Avenue	More images		
P-I Globe	1101 Elliott Avenue W.	More images		Globe-shaped neon sign, built in 1948 to advertise the Seattle Post-Intelligencer newspaper. Designated by the Landmarks Preservation Board in 2012.
P. P. Ferry House / Old Deanery of St. Mark's Cathedral	1531 10th Avenue E.	More images		
Pacific McKay and Ford McKay (demolished)	601-615 Westlake Avenue N.	More images		
Pacific Medical Center/U.S. Marine Hospital	1200 12th Avenue S.	More images		
Pacific Net & Twine Building	51 University Street			
Pacific Science Center	200 2nd Avenue N./Seattle Center	More images		
Pacific Telephone & Telegraph Garfield Exchange	1529 4th Ave W		December 8, 2016 (125214)	Landmark nomination Queen Anne Historical Society page
Palladian Apartments a.k.a. Calhoun Hotel	2000 Second Avenue	More images		
Panama Hotel	605 S. Main St	More images	January 17, 2022	
Pantages House	803 E. Denny Way			
Paramount Theater Building	901 Pine Street	More images		
Parker-Fersen House	1409 E Prospect Street			
Parsons House	618 W. Highland Drive			
Parsons Gardens, a.k.a. Parsons Memorial Garden	West of 618 W. Highland Drive	More images		
Pioneer Sand and Gravel Company Building	901 Harrison Street		April 14, 2016 (125022)	
Providence Hospital 1910 Building	528 – 17th Avenue	More images		
Puget Sound Power and Light Co. Utilities Building	800 Aloha Street	More images		
Queen Anne Boulevard	Certain streets on Queen Anne Hill (shown in red in image at right)	More images		
Queen Anne High School	215 Galer Street	More images		
Queen Anne Library	400 W. Garfield Street	More images		
Stewart House	10455 Maplewood Place SW			
Queen Anne Water Tank#1	1410 First Avenue N.	More images		
Querio House	Listed at 9326 7th Avenue S., now at 9364 7th Avenue S.			
Rainier Club	810 4th Avenue	More images		
Rainier Cold Storage & Ice / Seattle Brewing & Malting Company Building	6000-6004 Airport Way S.	More images		
Ramsing House	540 N.E. 80th Street			
RKO Distributing Company Building	2312-16 2nd Avenue			
Rohrer House	122 37th Ave. E.			
Roosevelt High School	1410 N.E. 66th Street	More images		
Rosen House	9017 Loyal Avenue N.W.			
Roy Vue Apartments	615 Bellevue Ave East	More images	August 21, 2020 (126146)	
Salmon Bay Bridge (Burlington Northern Bridge No. 4)	Railroad lines over Lake Washington Ship Canal in Ballard	More images		
Samuel Hyde House	3726 E. Madison Street	More images		
San Mateo Steam Ferry	Pier 37/39		March 14, 1977 (106273)	Sold to marina owner in British Columbia circa 1995; since sunk in Fraser River and partially demolished.
San Remo Apartment Building	606 E. Thomas Street			
Sand Point Naval Air Station Historic District	Magnuson Park	More images		
Satterlee House	4866 Beach Drive S.W.			
Schillestad Building	2111 First Avenue			
Schoenfeld Building	1012 1st Avenue			Also known as Standard Building.
Schooner Wawona	Historic Ships Wharf, 860 Terry Avenue N.	More images		Archaeologically documented and deconstructed 2009.
Schmitz Park Bridge	Admiral Way over Schmitz Park Ravine	More images		
Seaboard Building (formerly Northern Bank and Trust Building)	1506 Westlake Avenue	More images		
Statue of Chief Seattle / Seattle, Chief of Suquamish Statue	Tilikum Place; at intersection of 5th Avenue, Denny Way, and Cedar Street	More images		
Seattle Asian Art Museum at Volunteer Park	1400 E. Prospect Street	More images		
Seattle Betsuin Buddhist Temple	1427 S Main St.	More images	December 27, 1976	
Seattle Center House / a.k.a. The Armory	305 Harrison Street	More images		
Seattle Center Playhouse and Exhibition Hall	Seattle Center	Images		
Seattle Empire Laundry	2301 Western Avenue / 66 Bell Street			
Seattle First Baptist Church	1121 Harvard Avenue	More images		
Seattle Japanese Garden	1075 Lake Washington Blvd E	More images		
Seattle Labor Temple	2800 First Avenue	More images		
Seattle Monorail		More images		
Seattle National Bank Building (United Way)	720 Second Avenue			
Seattle Times Building	1120 John Street	More images	March 11, 1996 (118046)	Demolished in 2016.
Seattle Tower	1212 3rd Avenue	More images		
Seattle Yacht Club	1807 E. Hamlin Street	More images		
Securities Building	1907 Third Avenue	More images		
Seventh Church of Christ Scientist	2555 8th Avenue W	More images		
Seward Park Inn / Seward Park Annex	5900 Lake Washington Boulevard S.			
Seward School	2515 Boylston Avenue E.	More images		
Shafer Building / Sixth and Pine Building	515 Pine Street	More images		
Shannon and Wilson Office Building	3652-3670 Woodland Park Ave N	more images	July 20, 2018 (125623)	NBBJ-designed former headquarters of Shannon & Wilson
Sheridan Apartments	2011 Fifth Ave			
Shuey House (a.k.a. Henry Owen Shuey House)	5218 16th Avenue N.E.			
Sigma Kappa Mu	4510 22nd Avenue N.E.	More images		
Sixth Church of Christ Scientist	2656 42nd Avenue SW	More images		
Smith Tower	506 2nd Avenue	More images		
Snagboat W.T. Preston	Now on dry land in Anacortes, Washington	More images		
Sorrento Hotel	900 Madison Street	More images		
Space Needle	219 4th Avenue N.	More images		
St. James Cathedral, Rectory and Site	9th Avenue and Marion Street	More images		
St. Joseph's Church	732 18th Avenue	More images		
St Nicholas Russian Orthodox Cathedral	1714 13th Avenue	More images		
St. Nicholas/Lakeside School	1501 10th Avenue E.			
St. Spiridon Russian Orthodox Cathedral	400 Yale Avenue N.	More images		
Steinhart Theriault & Anderson Building	1264 Eastlake Avenue E.	More images	June 15, 2022	
Stevens School	1242 18th Avenue E.			
Stimson-Green Mansion	1204 Minor Avenue	More images		
Stuart/Balcom House	619 W. Comstock Street	More images		Designed by architect Abraham H. Albertson
Summit School / Northwest School	1415 Summit Avenue	More images		
Sunset Telephone & Telegraph/Queen Anne Masonic Temple	1608 4th Avenue W		December 13, 2019 (126017)	
Supply Laundry Building	1265 Republican Street	More images		
Swedish Club	1932 1st Avenue	More images	April 2, 2021 (126303)	
Temple De Hirsch Old Sanctuary	1500 Union Street	More images		Mostly demolished 1993; only part of the façade remains
Terminal Sales Building	1920 Dexter Avenue N.	More images		
Terminal Sales Annex	1931 2nd Avenue	More images		
Terry Avenue Building	320 Terry Avenue N.			
The Fairfax	1508 10th Avenue E			
The Showbox	1426 1st Avenue			
The Theodora	6559 35th Ave NE	More images		
Thompson/LaTurner House	3119 S. Day Street			
Times Square Building	414 Olive Way	More images		
Tolliver Temple	1915 E Fir Street	More images	June 21, 2023	Originally Sephardic Bikur Holim synagogue
Town Hall Seattle (former Fourth Church of Christ, Scientist)	1119 Eighth Avenue	More images		
Treat House (a.k.a. Harry Whitney Treat House)	1 W. Highland Drive			
Trinity Parish Episcopal Church	609 8th Avenue	More images		
Troy Laundry Building	311-329 Fairview Avenue N.	More images		Mostly demolished in 2015; only part of the façade remains
Tugboat Arthur Foss	Historic Ships Wharf, 860 Terry Avenue N.	More images		World's oldest wooden tugboat; Washington State Heritage Flagship
Turner-Koepf House / Beacon Hill Garden House	2336 15th Avenue South	More images		
Twenty-Third Avenue Houses Group	812-828 23rd Avenue		January 3, 1980 (108732)	
20th Avenue NE Bridge / Ravenna Park Bridge	1830 NE 58th St.	More images	October 8, 1976	A pedestrian and cycling bridge designed by architect Frank Melvin Johnson noted for its three pin arch steel construction.
U.S. Immigration Building	84 Union Street	More images		
Union Stables	2200 Western Ave	More images		
University Heights Elementary School	5031 University Way N.E.	More images		
University Library	5009 Roosevelt Way N.E.	More images		
University Methodist Episcopal Church and Parsonage	4142 Brooklyn Avenue N.E.	More images		
University National Bank	4502 University Way NE	More images		
University Presbyterian Church "Inn"	4555 16th Avenue N.E.			
UW Canoe House/ASUW Shell House/US Naval Training Hangar	3655 Walla Walla Rd NE	More images	December 20, 2018 (125742)	
UW Eagleson Hall	3902 E. Stevens Way NE		March 5, 2020 (126050)	Official address is misleading: the building is actually at the southwest corner of NE 42nd Street and 15th Avenue NE.
UW Faculty Club	4020 E. Stevens Way NE	More images		Now University of Washington Club
UW Engineering Annex / AYPE Foundry	3900 E. Stevens Way NE		August 21, 2020 (126153)	
UW Parrington Hall	4105 Memorial Way NE	More images	June 17, 2019 (125838)	
Van Asselt School	7201 Beacon Avenue South			
Van Vorst Building	413-421 Boren Avenue N.	More images		
Victorian House	1414 S. Washington Street			
Victorian Row Apartment Building	1236–1238 S. King Street			
Villa Costella	348 West Olympic Place	More images		
Volunteer Park		More images		
Volunteer Park Conservatory	1400 E. Galer Street	More images	July 16, 2010 (123344)	
Volunteer Park Grounds	1400 E Prospect Street	More images	December 8, 2016 (125215)	
Volunteer Park Water Tower	1400 E. Prospect Street	More images		
Wagner Floating Home	2700 Westlake Avenue N, Unit 10			
Wallingford Center / Interlake School	4416 Wallingford Avenue N./1815 N. 45th Street	More images		
Wallingford Fire and Police Station	1629 N. 45th Street	More images		
Ward House	520 E. Denny Way	More images		
Washington Athletic Club	1325 6th Avenue	More images		
Washington Hall	14th Avenue and Fir Street	More images		
Wayne Apartments	2214–2224 Second Avenue			After a fire in June 2022, the Wayne Apartments were demolished in late August 2022.
West Earth Co. Street Clock	406 Dexter Avenue N.	More images		Clock was dismantled February 2015 and shipped to Essence of Time, Lockport, New York for overhaul and restoration. It is intended to be reinstalled when construction of a new building on this corner is completed.
West Queen Anne Elementary School	515 W. Galer Street	More images		
West Queen Anne Walls	8th Place W. between W. Galer Street and W. Highland Drive	More images		
West Seattle High School	4075 S.W. Stevens Street	More images		
West Seattle Library	2306 42nd Avenue S.W.	More images		
White Motor Company Building	1021 E. Pine Street			
William Tell Hotel	2327 Second Ave.			
Wilson-Pacific School (Woodrow Wilson Jr. High School)	1330 N 90th St			
Wilsonian Apartments	4700-4720 University Way N.E.			
Windham Apartments	420 Blanchard Street			
Wintonia Hotel	1431 Minor Avenue	More images		
Women's University Club of Seattle	1105 Sixth Avenue			
Woodin House	5801 Corson Avenue South			a.k.a. Dr. Scott and Imogene Woodin House
Yesler Houses (H. L. Yesler's First Addition, Block 32, Lots 12, 13 & 14)	103, 107 and 109 23rd Avenue			
Yesler Terrace Steam Plant	120 8th Avenue			
YMCA Central Branch: South Building	909 4th Avenue	More images		
YWCA Building	1118 Fifth Avenue	More images		

Sources for list:

== See also ==
- National Register of Historic Places listings in Seattle
