= List of places of worship in Seattle =

This is a list of places of worship in Seattle, Washington:

== Churches and cathedrals ==
- Blessed Sacrament Church (Seattle)
- Fifth Church of Christ, Scientist (Seattle, Washington)
- First Church of Christ, Scientist (Seattle, Washington)
- First Methodist Protestant Church of Seattle
- Grace Gospel Chapel
- Immanuel Lutheran Church (Seattle, Washington)
- North American Martyrs Catholic Church
- Plymouth Church Seattle
- St. Demetrios Greek Orthodox Church (Seattle)
- St. James Cathedral (Seattle)
- St. Joseph's Church (Seattle)
- St. Mark's Episcopal Cathedral, Seattle
- Saint Spiridon Orthodox Cathedral
- Seventh Church of Christ, Scientist (Seattle, Washington)
- Sixth Church of Christ, Scientist (Seattle, Washington)
- Trinity Episcopal Parish Church (Seattle)
- University Presbyterian Church (Seattle, Washington)
- University Unitarian Church

== Other ==
- Bikur Cholim Machzikay Hadath
- Dai Bai Zan Cho Bo Zen Ji
- Temple De Hirsch Sinai
- Ohaveth Sholum Congregation
- Seattle Betsuin Buddhist Temple
- Sephardic Bikur Holim Congregation
