= Parsons Gardens Park =

Park in Seattle, Washington, U.S.

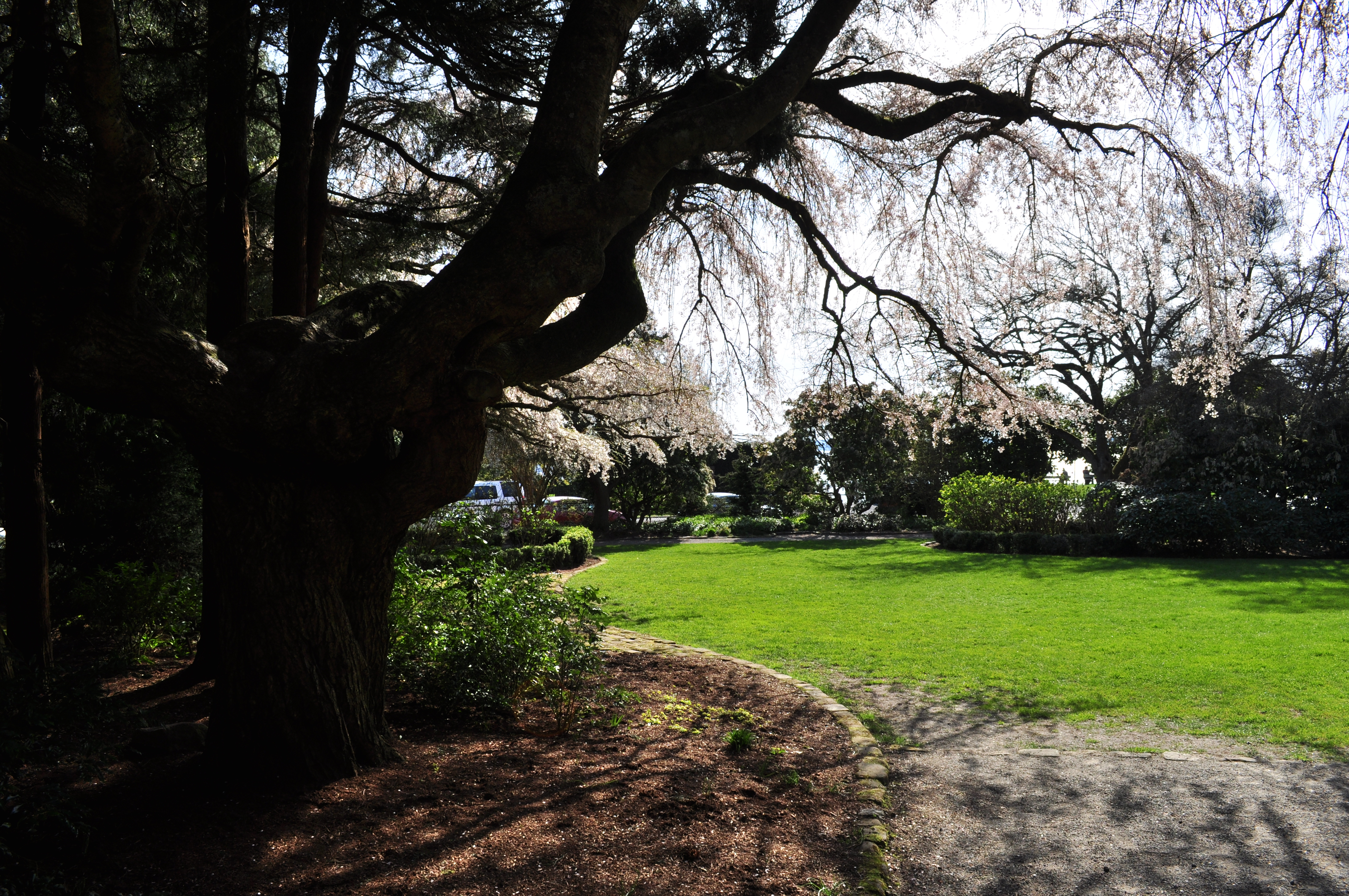
- Interactive map of Parsons Gardens Park
- Type: Urban Park
- Location: Seattle, Washington
- Coordinates: 47°37′47″N 122°21′58″W
- Area: 0.4 acres (0.16 ha)
- Established: 1905; 121 years ago
- Operator: Seattle Parks and Recreation

Seattle Landmark

Parsons Gardens Park (also called Parsons Memorial Garden) is a 0.4-acre (0.16 ha) city park in the Queen Anne neighborhood of Seattle, Washington. It was called by Fodor's a "a prim urban oasis", and by another guide a "secret garden for non-tourists". The park sits at one end of West Highland Drive, across the street from Betty Bowen Viewpoint and not far from better-known Kerry Park.

According to the city Parks Department and city guides by Lonely Planet and others, the location is popular for summer weddings.

The park is a designated City of Seattle landmark.

The location was previously the private garden of the home of Reginald and Maude Parsons since 1905. In 1956 their children donated the property to the city.
