= Carroll's Jewelers Street Clock =

Clock in Seattle, Washington, U.S.

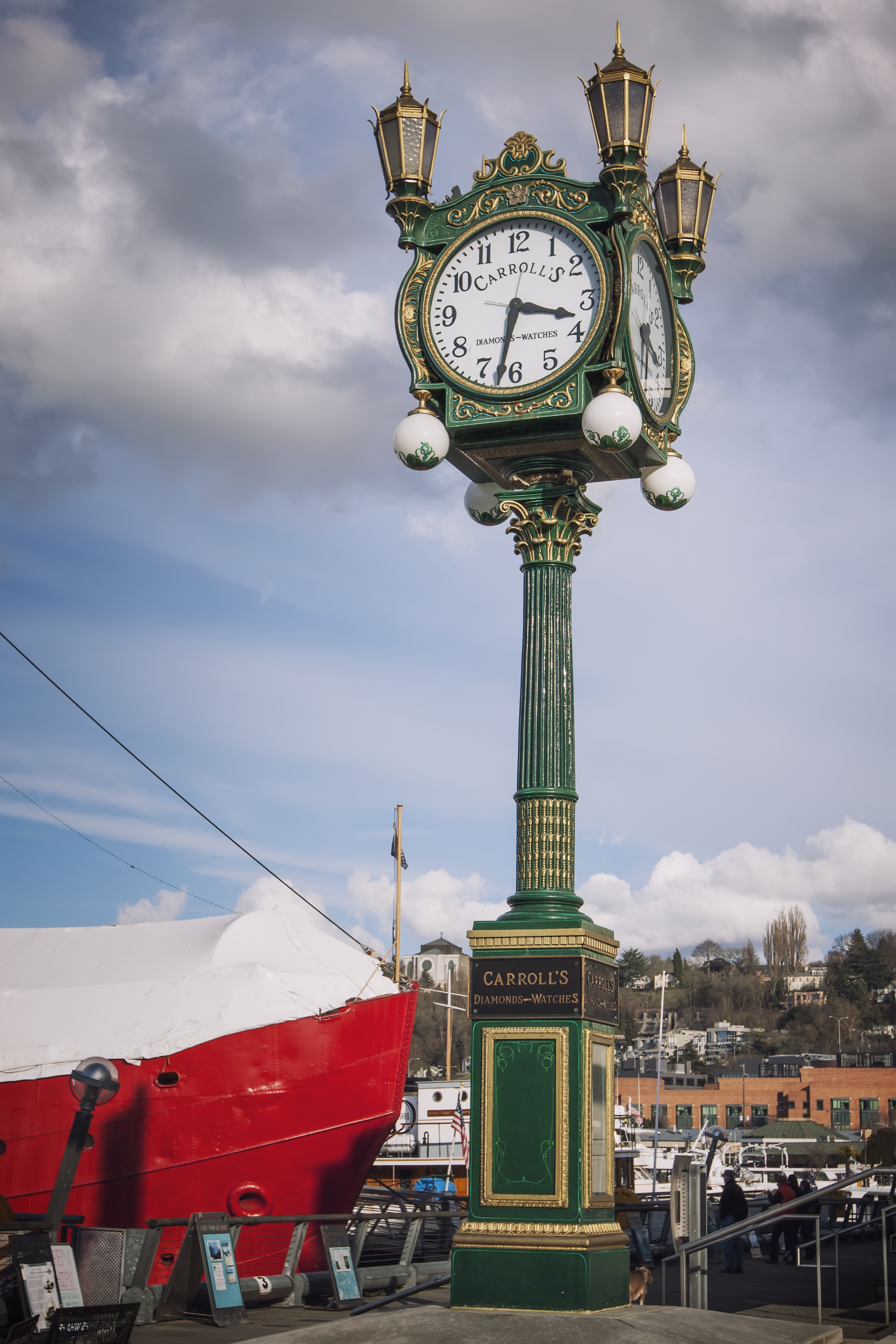
- The clock in South Lake Union in 2016
- Location: Seattle, Washington, U.S.
- Interactive map of Carroll's Jewelers Street Clock
- Coordinates: 47°37′40″N 122°20′13″W

The Carroll's Jewelers Street Clock is a clock installed outside Seattle's Museum of History & Industry, in the U.S. state of Washington. It has been designated a city landmark.

== See also ==
- List of Seattle landmarks
