= Norton Building =

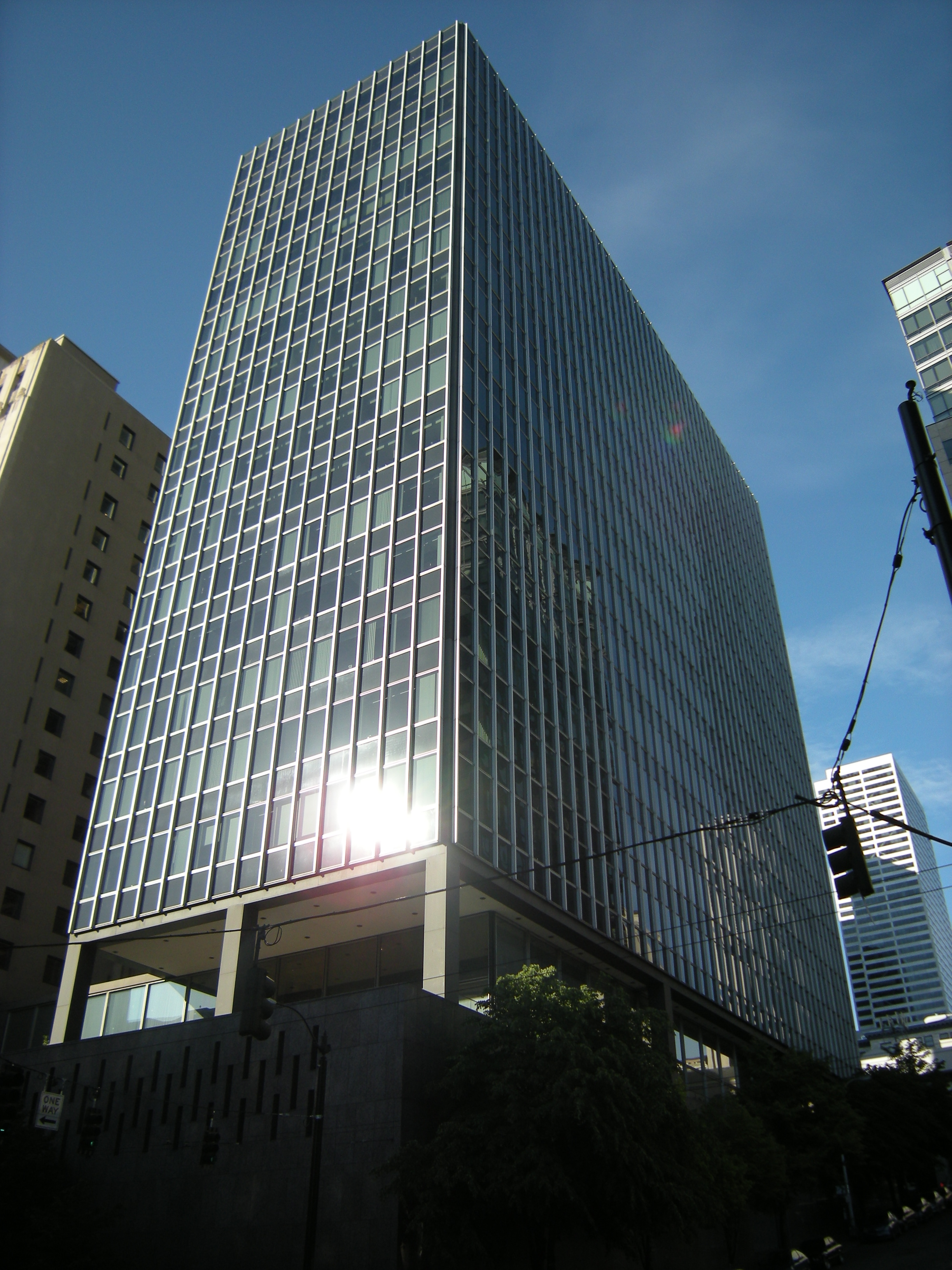

- Location within Downtown Seattle

General information
- Status: Completed
- Type: Office
- Location: 801 2nd Ave; Seattle, Washington, 98104
- Coordinates: 47.604°N 122.335°W
- Opened: October 30, 1959
- Cost: $12 million
- Owner: Hines Norton Seattle LLC

Technical details
- Floor count: 17 (excluding 4 story base)

Design and construction
- Architects: Bindon & Wright, Skidmore, Owings & Merrill

Seattle Landmark
- Designated: April 6, 2009

The Norton Building is a post-World War II office building in the International Style, located in Seattle, Washington, United States. Built on a sloping lot with the foundation of a large granite base, the building rises 17 stories above the city.

It is notable as one of the first post-World War II private office buildings in the city and among the first in the country to use pre-stressed concrete construction. Furthermore, its Modernism contrasts with the neighboring Exchange Building which is in the Art Deco style.

The Norton Building was constructed on the site of the Haller Building, which was built in 1889 and was demolished in 1957. The new tower opened on October 30, 1959. The Norton Building was designated as a city landmark by the Seattle City Council in 2009.

== Tenants ==
The Norton Building has housed multiple tenants including LMN Architects, the Puget Sound Business Journal, and Pacific Northern Airlines. The building's 17th floor was also home to the member-only Harbor Club, which peaked at 1,000 members in the 1990s and closed on December 31, 2015. The building has sweeping views of the city and Puget Sound region.
