= Schoenfeld Building (Seattle) =

- Seattle Landmark
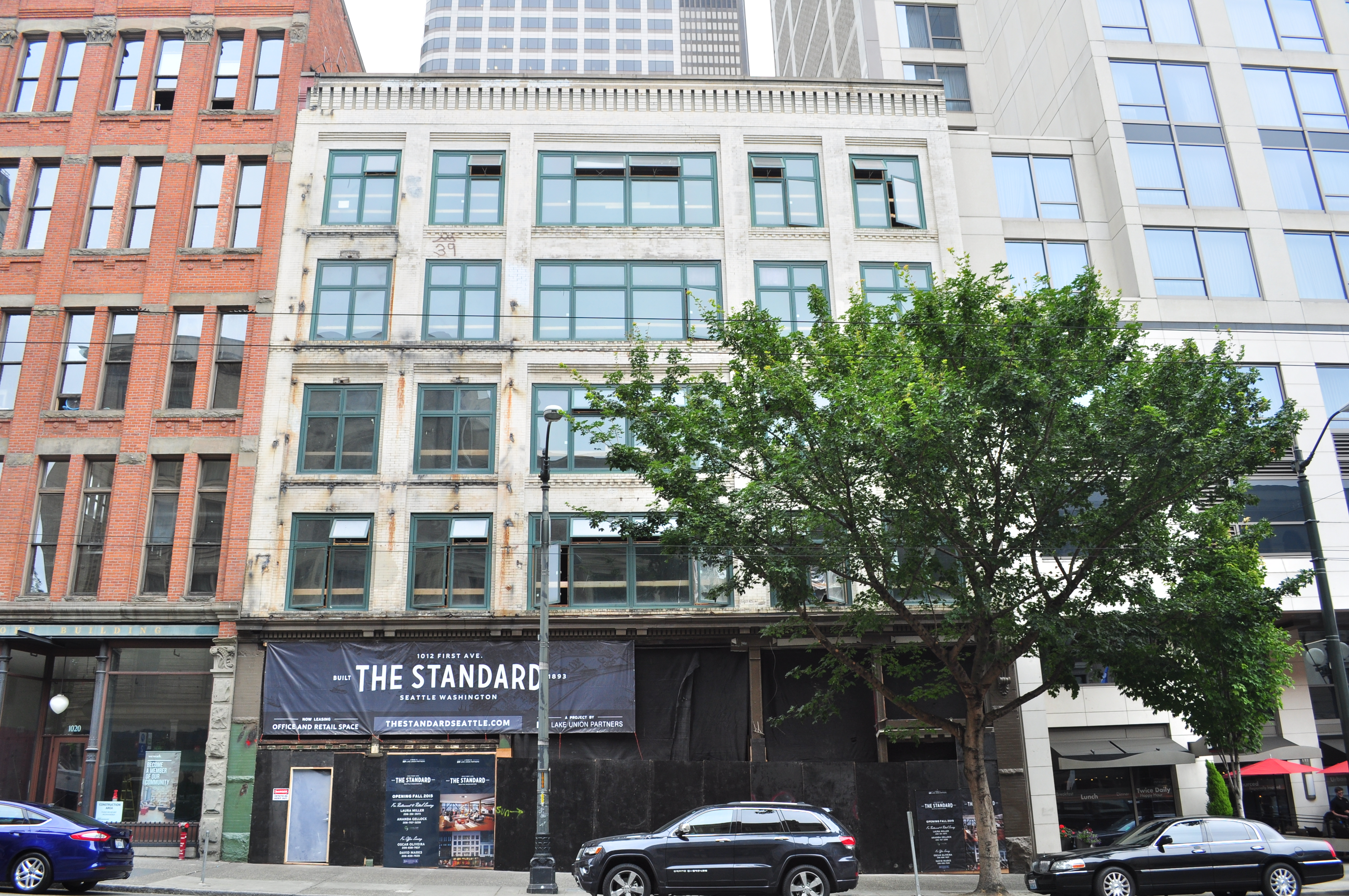
- The Standard Building, July 2015

- Location within Downtown Seattle
- Location: 1012–1016 1st Ave., Seattle, Washington
- Coordinates: 47°36′19.52″N 122°20′11.20″W
- Built: 1891 & 1899
- Architect: Boone & Wilcox (1891); Thompson & Thompson (1899)
- Architectural style: Chicago School
- Designated SEATL: November 19, 2014

The Schoenfeld Building, also known as the Standard Block, the Struve Building and the Meves Building, is a historic commercial building located at 1012 1st Avenue in downtown Seattle, Washington. Originally built in 1891 by land, real estate and interurban railway developer Fred E. Sander, it has been used throughout its history for retail, light manufacturing, and office space. It was expanded and remodeled to its current appearance in the late 1890s by one of its most notable tenants, Louis Schoenfeld, to house his rapidly expanding Standard Furniture Company which in less than a decade would outgrow this and a now-demolished neighboring building and result in the construction of the Broadacres Building at 2nd and Pine streets in 1907.

Owned from 1896 onward by the Struve family and later restaurateur A.J. Meves, for the entire second half of the 20th century the building was owned by the Polishuk family, pawnbrokers who operated Central Loan, the pawn shop seen in the 1974 John Wayne film McQ, for many years. The building was sold to the Wehl family after Nettie Polishuk's death in 2000 and they began gradually modernizing the building. Central Loan continued to operate into the late 2000s, and its closure was seen as the end of an era in a quickly gentrifying city.

Designated a Seattle City landmark in 2014 as the Schoenfeld Building but officially known as The Standard, the building underwent a complete renovation and seismic retrofit in 2015. A 6th floor penthouse, not visible from the street, was added among other upgrades for prospective office tenants and the building remains fully occupied to the current day.

== History ==
=== Fred Sander and the Struves ===
Prior to the Great Seattle Fire, the lot at 1012 to 1016 First Avenue was occupied only by a small house set back towards the alley. Originally the home of pioneer John Ross, it dated to the 1860s. By the late 1880s the business district was beginning to overtake Seattle's original residential area and the rest of the block along First avenue had been filled with low-rise wooden commercial buildings. Shortly before the fire, work would begin on the massive Holyoke Building directly to the north, the excavation pit of which would prevent the fire from spreading further north. More brick buildings would rise to replace the commercial buildings burnt to the south including the 3-story Griffith Block and 2-story Maddocks Building, among the first to be completed in the aftermath.

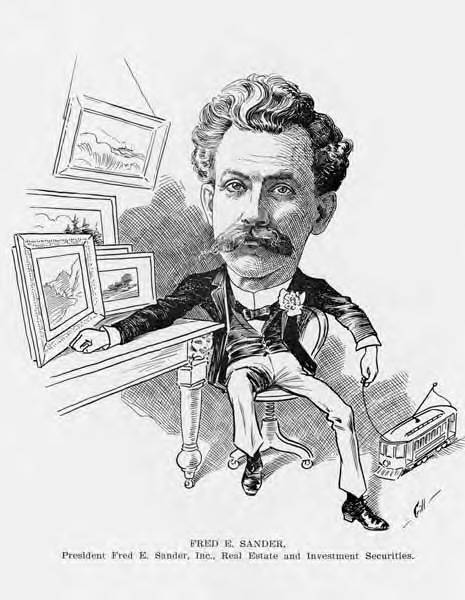
Caricature of Fred E. Sander, 1906

Soon after the fire the lot was purchased by realtor Fred Everett Sander, who initially put it up for sale, where it sat unsold for over a year before he decided to improve the property himself. Sander, a native of Mississippi and a well respected businessman in Seattle since the late 1870s, was responsible for building Seattle's first cable car line in 1887 and would later be instrumental in securing the right of way for the interurban lines to both Tacoma and Everett operated by the Puget Sound Electric Railway. In March 1891 Sander commissioned architects Boone & Wilcox to design an impressive 5-story stone-clad building that would cost $50,000 but these plans were soon scaled way back. A building permit was issued to Sander on June 3, 1891, for a simple 3-story brick building to cost only $15,000.

The Sander Building was completed in less than 2 months and was ready for occupancy by August 1. It was initially divided into two spaces spanning all 3 floors, with the John Schram stove and tinware company occupying numbers 1012-14 and the Washington Rubber Company located at number 1016. The latter would move out after only a year, soon to be replaced by the Scoones & Co. auction house and later the Barnes furniture store.

In July 1896 Sander, still trying to recover from heavy losses incurred by the Panic of 1893, lost his building to foreclosure when he failed to fulfill a $20,000 promissory note made to the German Savings and Loan Society of San Francisco in October 1891. They would acquire the building for $34,414.10 to cover the judgement against Fred and his wife Nellie. The loan society's local agent was prominent attorney and ex-mayor Henry G. Struve, who happened to be a partner in the law firm handling the sheriff's sale of Sander's other foreclosed properties. He would assume ownership of the building where it would remain in his family for over 30 years, with his son Frederick Karl Struve taking over ownership after Henry's death in 1905.

=== Louis Schoenfeld ===
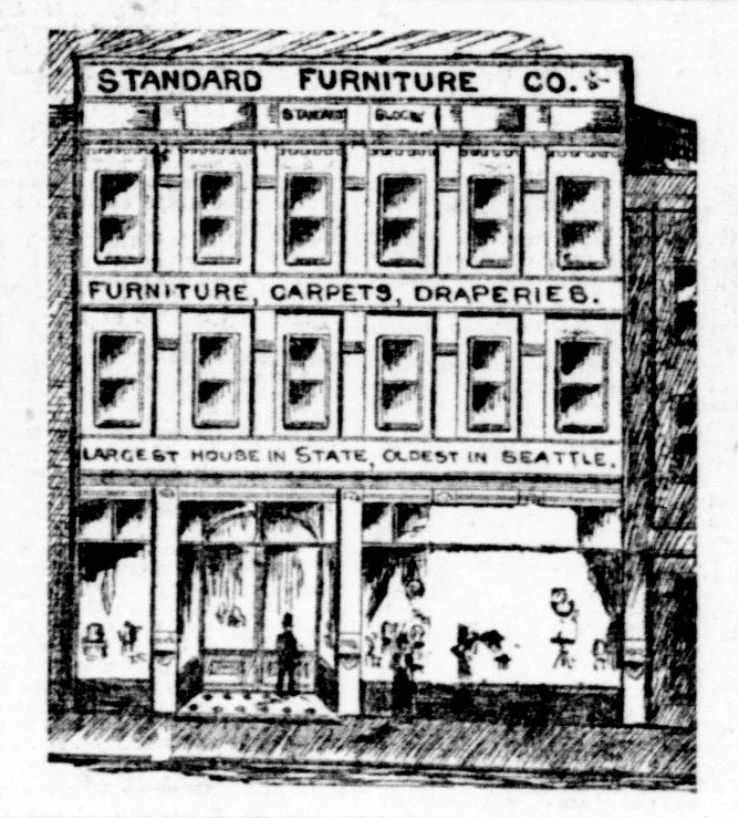
A rudimentary depiction of the building's original appearance, used in advertising from 1897 to 1899

Louis Schoenfeld arrived in Seattle by steamer in 1887 from San Diego, carrying with him the name and physical signage from his business in that city, the Standard Furniture Company, which he had begun in 1864 in Virginia City, Nevada. He placed the sign on his new shop in a small false-front building at Second and Yesler, before moving into a storefront in the recently expanded Occidental Hotel in 1888. He would lose all but a single set of furniture to the great fire but his supply chain remained intact, and from a temporary store located in a tent, he quickly gained a place among Seattle's leading merchants.

After spending most of the 1890s between temporary quarters on Western Avenue and the basement of the New York Block on Second Avenue, Schoenfeld leased the Sander Building from Struve in 1896 with plans to occupy the entire 20,000 square foot space. He had the red brick façade painted a bright white and the name officially changed to the Standard Block. The new store opened in February 1897 touting itself as the largest furniture store in Washington state.

The business expanded so rapidly that in 1899 the building underwent a reconstruction that added two additional floors and replaced the upper facade with one of cream-colored brick and larger windows to let more light into the show rooms. The father and son team of Thompson & Thompson, then recent arrivals from Salt Lake City, were the architects of this reconstruction. Three years later the adjacent Griffith Block, then owned by Frank Wadsworth, underwent a similar reconstruction by the same architects and the Standard Furniture Company would expand into that building's upper floors in early 1903. Six archways were punched through the walls between the two buildings, under the direction of architect Emil De Neuf.

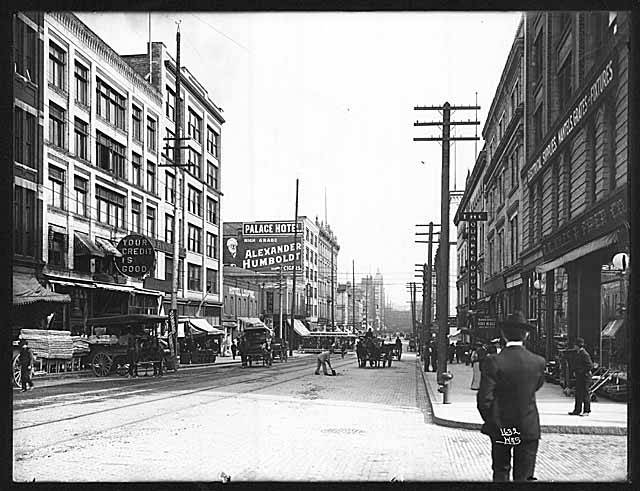
First Avenue in the mid-1900s

The 1900s were Seattle's and Schoenfeld's most prosperous decade, which saw him opening branch stores with his sons in Bellingham and Tacoma and before long he was again looking to expand the Seattle store in a single new building designed specifically for his needs, which was completed uptown at Second and Pine Streets in 1908. They were fully moved out of their old building by the end of March.

=== The Meves, the Polishuks and Central Loan ===
With the departure of Standard Furniture imminent in October 1907, Frederick Karl Struve, trustee of the Struve Estate, proposed converting the building into a 120-room hotel; architect Julian F. Everett was commissioned to design two additional floors for the building, but these plans were never carried forward. Instead the building was partitioned into 3 ground floor retail spaces with lofts above, which became home to office space, storage rooms and manufacturing firms. Over the years the ground floor was occupied by various used furniture dealers, sporting goods stores (including an early location of Warshal's) and a motion picture theater, the Crown.

In 1926 the building was purchased from the Struve family as an investment by August J. Meves, proprietor of Meves Cafeteria, one of Seattle's most popular eateries of the era. The neighboring Wadsworth Building would be purchased by Meves' brother Henry the following year and both buildings would become known as the Meves Buildings. In 1931 the building was acquired by Puget Sound Savings & Loan and eventually the entire block including both Meves buildings would be purchased by the Central Seattle Building Corporation, a holding company for several major local developers who proposed replacing the entire block with a massive skyscraper designed by John Graham, Sr.

The top floor of the Meves building, then occupied by the Northwest Awning Company and storage space for the Schneider art gallery was gutted by a mysterious fire on January 20, 1933, that caused $40,000 in damage and injured several firemen. Because the building to the south was also known as the Meves Building, there was initial confusion as to which businesses were actually affected. While the building's roof caved in and most floors received smoke and water damage, it was not a complete loss and was quickly rebuilt.

With plans for a mega-block skyscraper put on hold by the Great Depression and finally abandoned, the Central Seattle Building Corporation sold the building in 1945 to pawnbrokers Irman and Nettie Polishuk. Irman had opened his first pawn shop, OK Loan, in Pioneer Square in 1923 and moved his business to 1016 First Avenue in the 1950s, merging with the Central sporting goods store, opened by his in-laws shortly after World War II selling army surplus goods. The store was later renamed Central Loan and Gun Exchange and became one of the most well known in Seattle, even being used as a filming location for the 1974 John Wayne film McQ. During this period there were at least 27 pawn shops on First Avenue alone as well as numerous taverns and X-rated stores downtown, patronized by transients, dock workers and the residents of the cheap hotels that once lined the avenue.

=== The Standard in the 21st Century ===
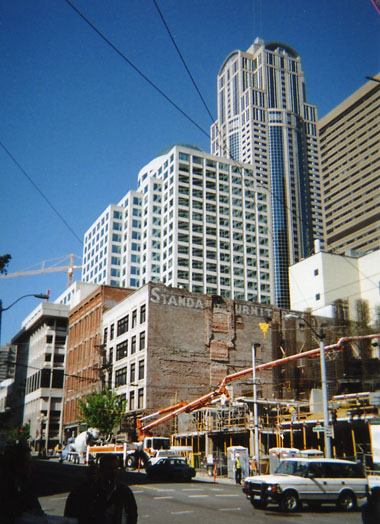
The Standard Building in 2005 with the recent demolition of its neighbors revealing the Standard Furniture ghost sign and filled in arches.

The Polishuks retired in the mid-1970s, selling Central Loan to Gerson Goldman. The shop was run by him and later his son Alan and continued to have strong business into the late 1990s. After the death of Nettie Polishuk in 2000, the building was sold to the Wehl family, who began plans to refurbish it for office space. The neighboring buildings, including Warshal's and the other Meves Building to the south were demolished in 2004 for the Madison Tower Condominium, leaving Central Loan and an adjacent adult video store among the last seedy businesses left along First Avenue. During demolition a ghost sign for Standard Furniture hidden for over 100 years was revealed along the building's roofline. With luxury condos and hotels taking over the neighborhood and seeing their core clientele dying off or being pushed out by gentrification, Central Loan closed its doors in 2007.

The building was sold in June 2014 for $4,312,500.00 to the MWIC 1012 Seattle LLC, who after nominating it for city landmark status that November, would over the next several years completely refurbish the building inside and out, including removal of the fire escape and repainting of the building's façade, seismic retrofitting of all floors and the construction of a penthouse on the rooftop level. They would also revive 'The Standard' as the building's official name. MWIC 1012 would sell the building in July 2017 for $15,510,000.00 to Kar Standard LLC, who continue to maintain the building as office space. The ground floor is currently occupied by a hair salon.

== See also ==
- List of landmarks in Seattle
