= Cheasty Boulevard South =

Route in Seattle, Washington, US

Coordinates: 47°34′06″N 122°17′58″W

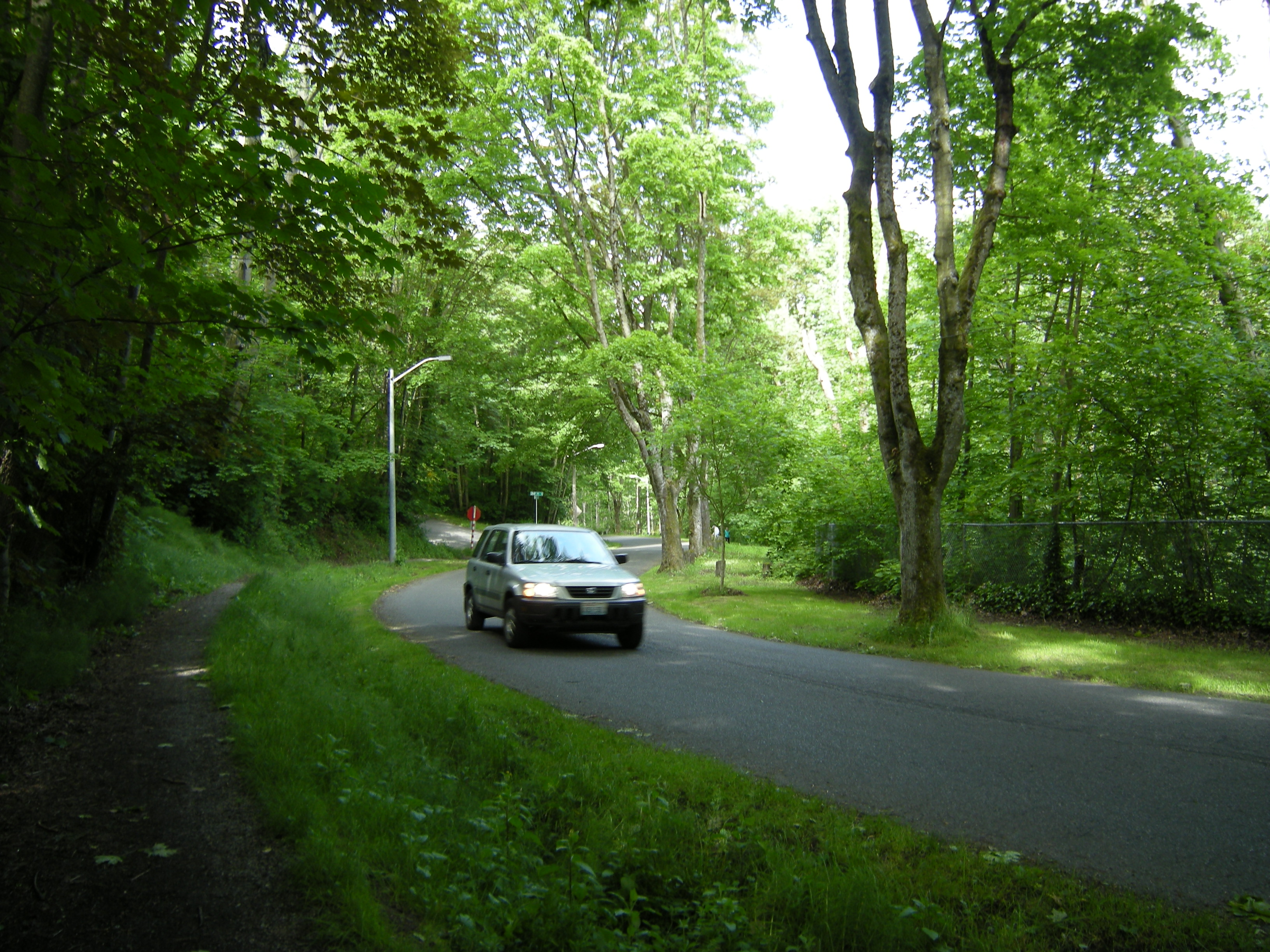
- Former name(s): Jefferson Boulevard
- Maintained by: City of Seattle
- Length: 1.3 mi (2.1 km)

Construction
- Construction start: 1903
- Completion: 1910

Seattle Landmark
- Designated: January 15, 2003

Cheasty Boulevard South is a 1.3-mile (2.1 km) route along the eastern edge of Seattle, Washington's Beacon Hill neighborhood. It was declared a City of Seattle landmark on January 15, 2003. Designed in 1903 as part of Seattle's Olmsted parks system, the property was acquired in 1910. Originally named Jefferson Boulevard (after Jefferson Park), it was renamed in 1914 after E.C. Cheasty of the Parks Board, a former commissioner of the Seattle Police Department and the Alaska–Yukon–Pacific Exposition.
