= Arboretum Sewer Trestle =

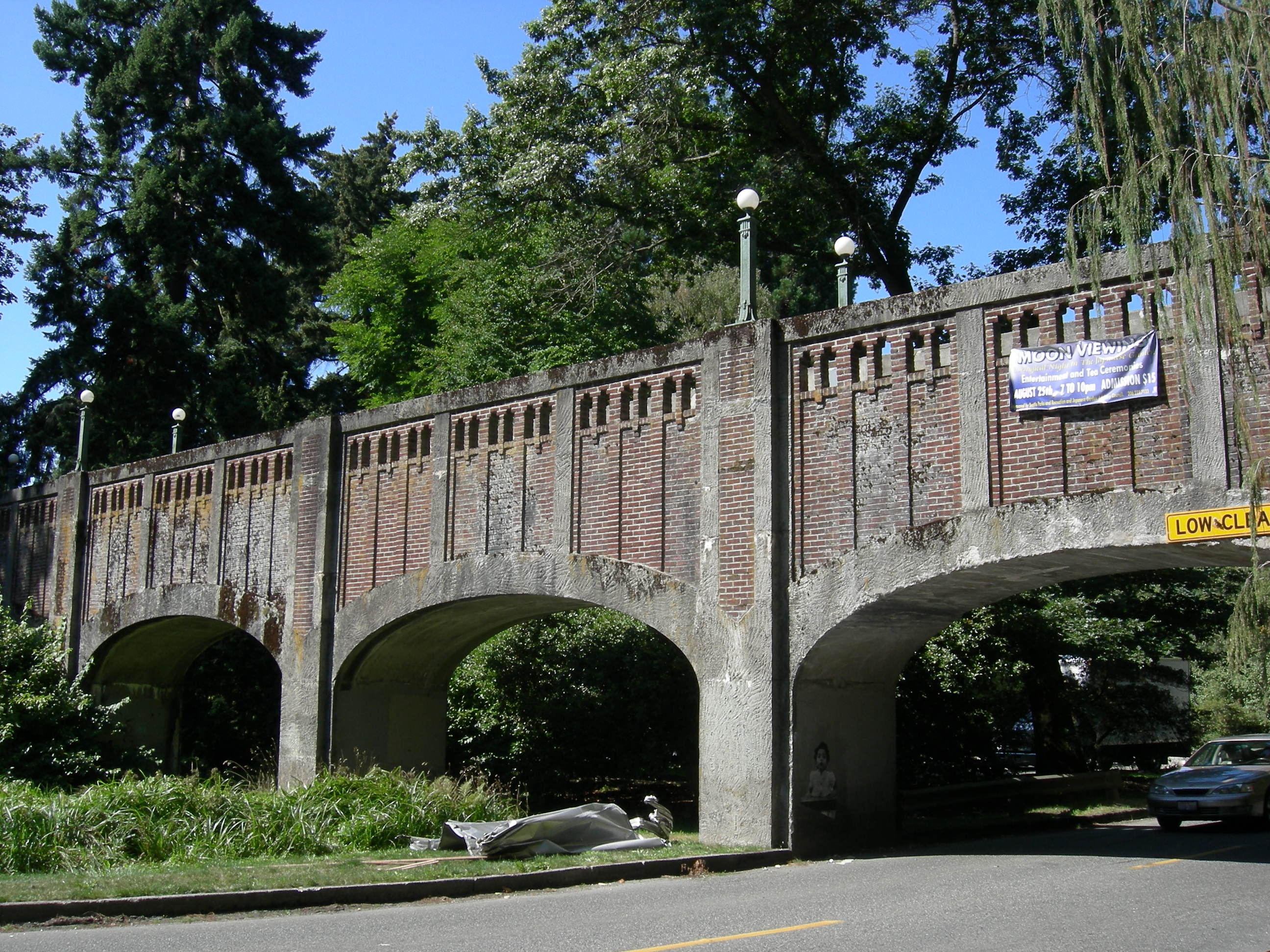
- Coordinates: 47.6395°N 122.2969°W
- Carries: Pedestrians
- Crosses: Lake Washington Boulevard
- Locale: Washington Park Arboretum
- Other name: Arboretum Aqueduct
- Owner: City of Seattle

Characteristics
- Material: Concrete, brick (façade),
- Trough construction: Steel
- Total length: 180 feet (55 m)
- Height: 23 feet (7.0 m)
- Traversable?: Yes
- No. of spans: 6
- Piers in water: 0
- Clearance below: 9 feet 6 inches (2.90 m)

History
- Architect: Wilcox & Sayward
- Construction end: 1910
- Opened: 1911

Statistics
- Toll: None
- Arboretum Sewer Trestle
- U.S. National Register of Historic Places
- Seattle Landmark
- Location: Seattle, Washington
- Built: 1911
- MPS: Historic Bridges/Tunnels in Washington State TR
- NRHP reference No.: 82004229
- SEATL No.: 106070

Significant dates
- Added to NRHP: July 16, 1982
- Designated SEATL: December 21, 1976

Location
- Interactive map of Arboretum Sewer Trestle

The Arboretum Sewer Trestle (also known as Arboretum Aqueduct, Arboretum Aqueduct and Sewer Trestle, or Wilcox Footbridge) is a historic multiarched concrete-and-brick trestle and footbridge in the Washington Park Arboretum in Seattle, Washington. It was listed on the National Register of Historic Places (NRHP) in 1982 (ID #82004229). It also has city landmark status, with ID #106070. As observed in a letter to the City Engineering Department in 1912, "The bridge is not an 'apurtenance of the sewer.' It is a piece of ornamental bridge architecture designed elaborately and is a very much greater thing than the sewer itself, in every way."

== Accident ==
On April 16, 2008, a charter bus carrying the Garfield High School girls softball team crashed into the trestle, injuring a number of passengers and shearing off the bus's roof.
