= Hahn Building (Seattle) =

Building in Seattle, Washington, U.S.

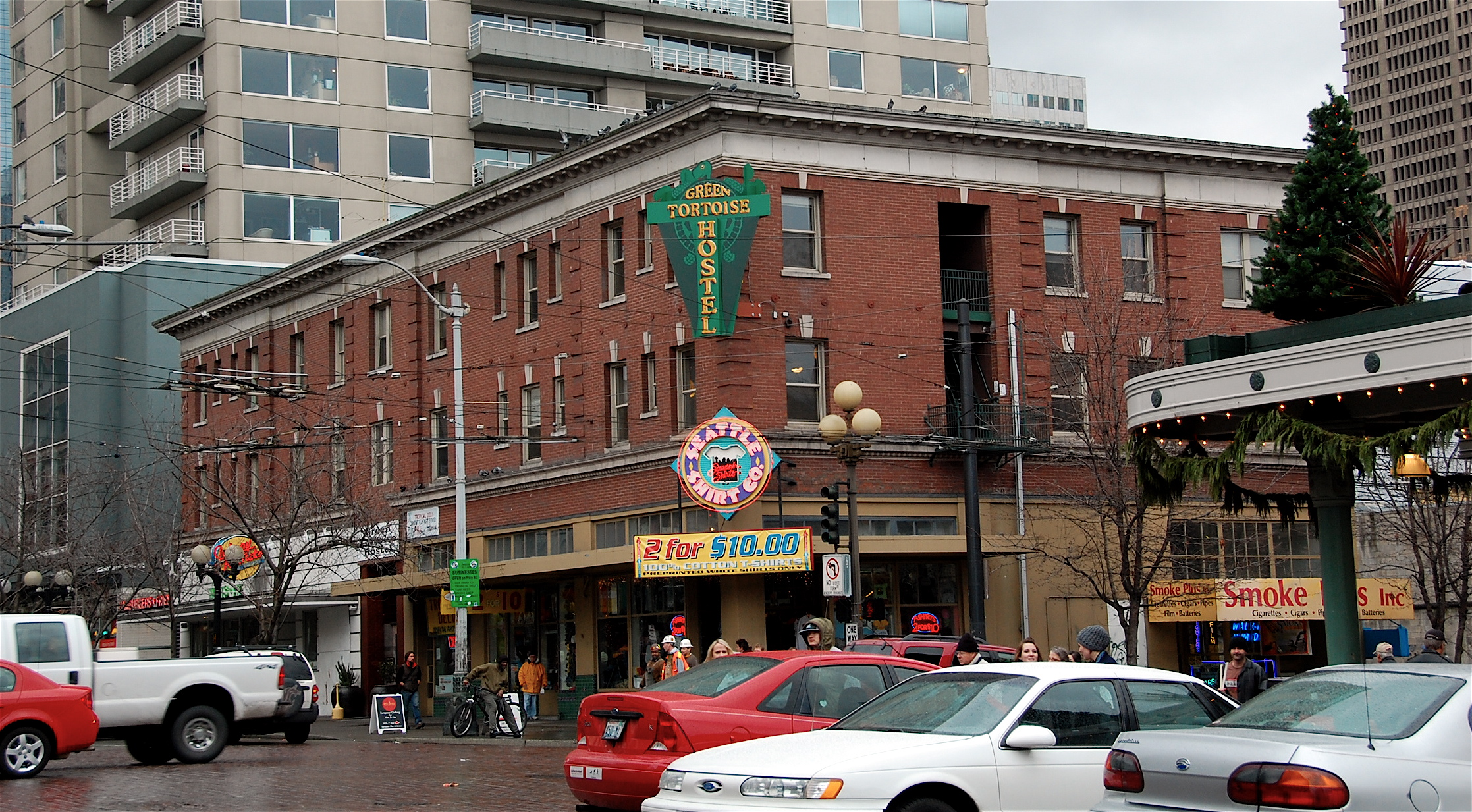
- The building's exterior in 2007
- Interactive map of the Hahn Building area

General information
- Location: Seattle, Washington, United States
- Coordinates: 47°36′32″N 122°20′22.5″W

The Hahn Building (formerly Hotel Elliott) is a historic building at the intersection of Pike Street and 1st Avenue (103 Pike Street) in Seattle, in the U.S. state of Washington. The structure has been designated a city landmark. It currently houses Green Tortoise Hostel.

== See also ==
- List of Seattle landmarks
