= Norvell House =

House in Seattle, Washington, U.S.

Coordinates: 47.6804°N 122.4001°W

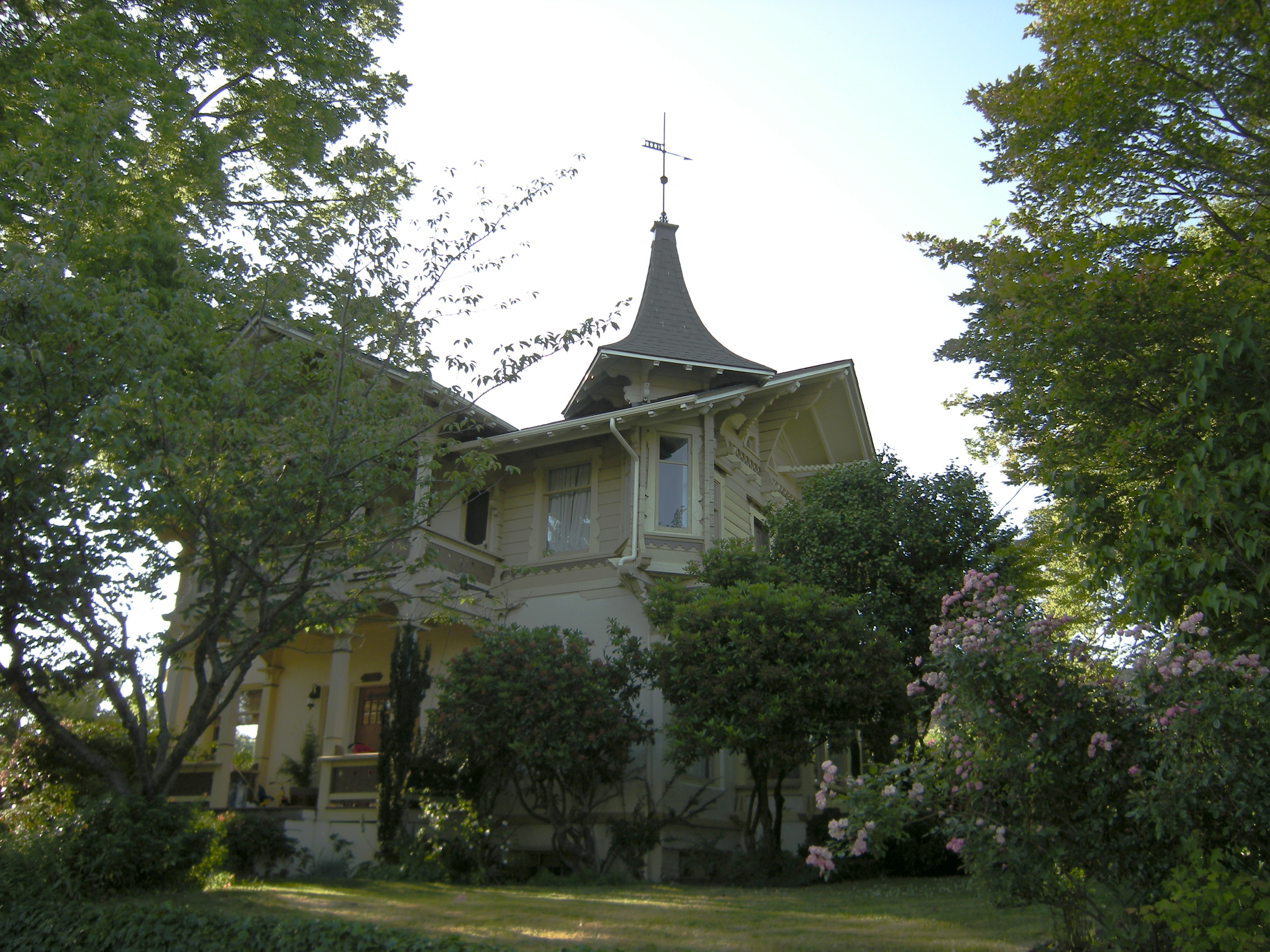
The Norvell House

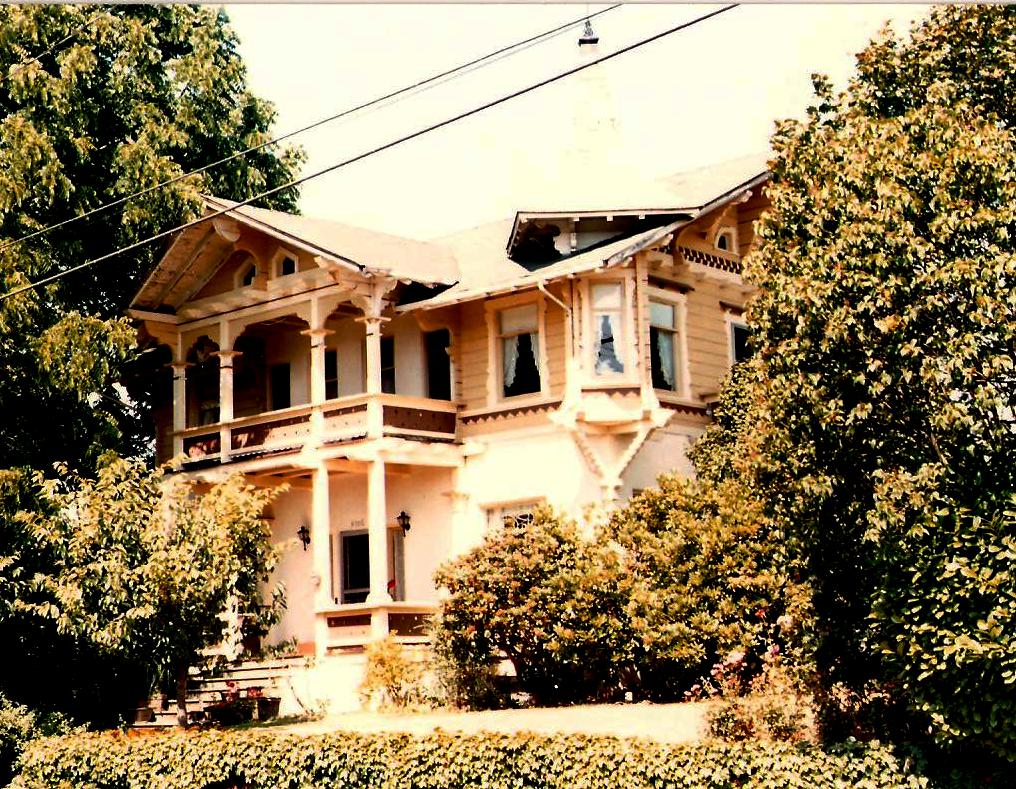
c.1985

Designated a Seattle, Washington Landmark, the Norvell House was built in 1908 and is a late example of the Swiss chalet style of Architecture. Located in the community of Ballard, in the vicinity of Sunset Hill, it sits on its original-sized lot with impressive heritage trees and retains its flanking carriage house.

== Architectural style ==
The house combines elements of vernacular architecture and eclecticism. The generous interior woodwork and fir floors indicate the importance of the local lumber industry. The interior, however, also contains many design influences from the early twentieth century, such as classical revival columns, American Craftsman-style trim and moldings along with beveled and stained glass windows, while the exterior is loaded with ornate brackets, turrets and balconies. The house contains fanciful elements in addition to large overhanging eaves: a flared cupola resting on the front roof somewhat resembles the Zytglogge clock tower in Bern, Switzerland.

As the Norvell House is located in a community extensively settled by Norwegians, it has been suggested the architectural style of the home was influenced by the fashionable late nineteenth century style in Norway, where the Swiss Chalet style evolved into a distinctive variation known as the "Viking" or Dragon Style" . In Norway there had been a revival of interest in the preservation of the historic Stave churches which characteristically include curves, carvings, fancy-cut balustrades and shingles in their design, and many Norwegians began to include these details in their newly built homes, hotels and other commercial buildings. The Norvell House however lacks any of these purely Norwegian motifs, and so it is categorized as a local example of the Swiss Chalet revival style.

== History ==
The house is now more than a century old. It was originally built in 1908 for the manager of the Stimson Lumber Mill using fir timber from the sawmill in Ballard, but takes its name from the owners who occupied the house for the longest period of time, James and Hazel Norvell. They purchased it in 1949, a time when it was considered by many postwar families to be out-of-date, but valuing its style, chose to retain most of its original features unchanged. James Norvell died in 1986 and Hazel remained in the house until her death in 2005.

The house was designated a Seattle Landmark on May 14, 1979.

In March of 2012 a local contractor who in 2010 had restored another Seattle Landmark home was hired to help select paint colors,repair, and repaint the Norvell House.

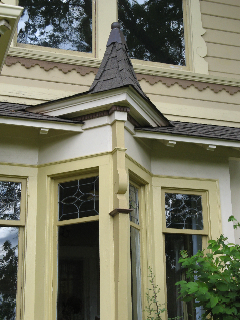
Exterior shot of windows

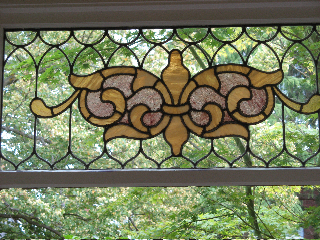
A stained glass panel

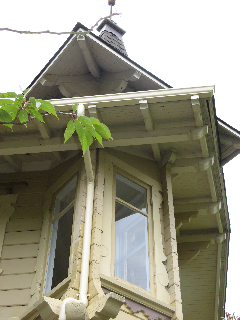
Overhanging eaves

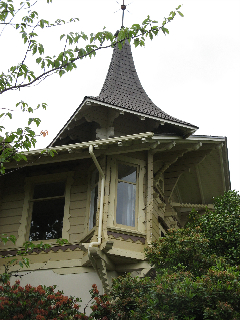
Cupola
