= Sanctuary at Admiral =

Historic church building in Washington, US

Coordinates: 47°34′46″N 122°23′06″W

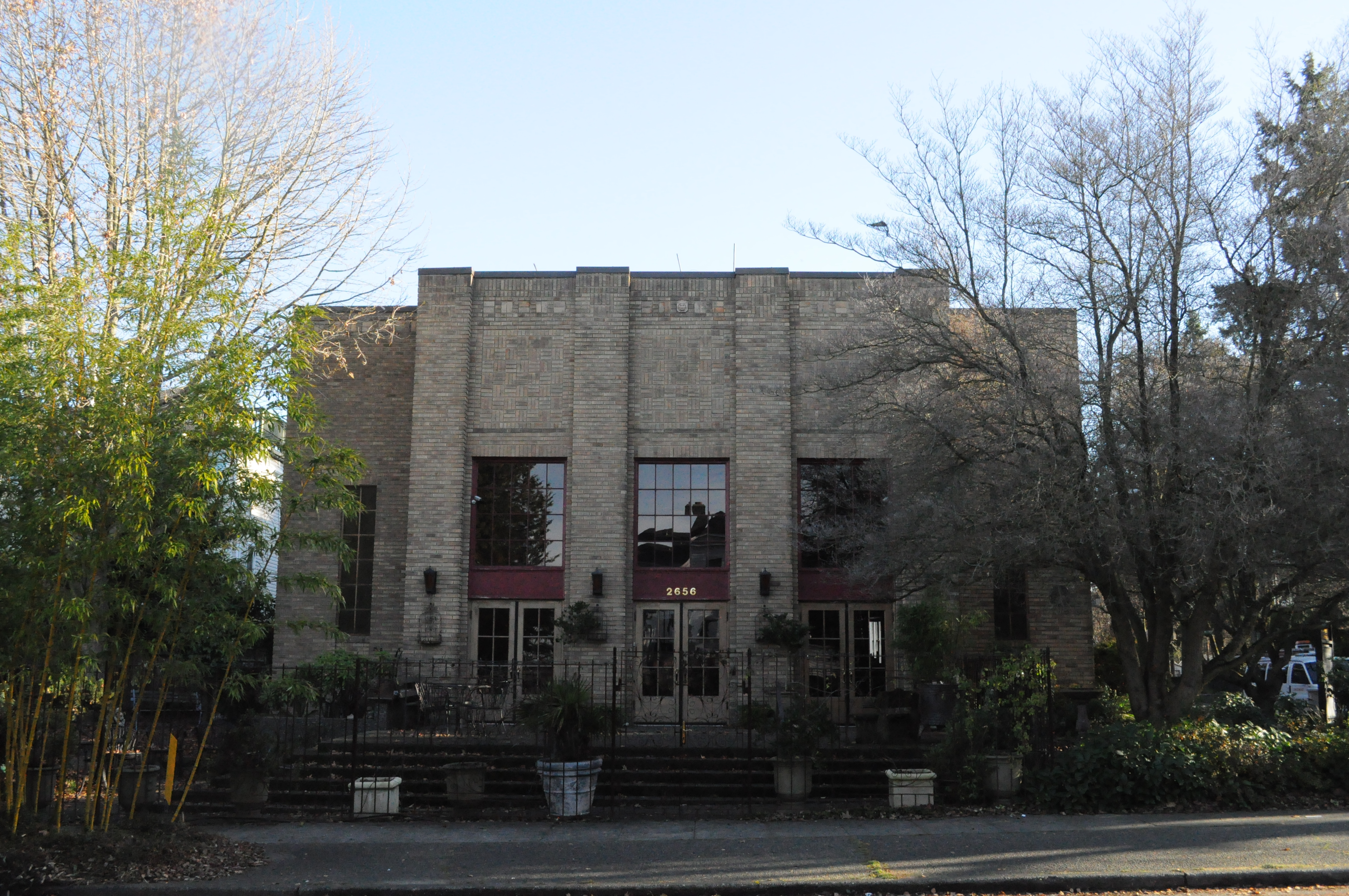

General information
- Architectural style: Art Deco
- Location: United States
- Completed: 1929
- Client: Sixth Church of Christ, Scientist, Seattle

Design and construction
- Architect: Gerald C. Field

Seattle Landmark
- Designated: May 14, 2010

Sanctuary at Admiral, also known as Sixth Church of Christ, Scientist, is an historic church edifice which has been converted to a venue for weddings and banquets and is located at 2656 42nd Avenue, Southwest, in the Admiral District of West Seattle in Seattle, Washington.

== History ==
Built in 1929 by contractor Neil McDonald, Sixth Church of Christ, Scientist was designed by Seattle architect Gerald C. Field in the Art Deco style of architecture. Sixth Church, which had been meeting in homes and then in rented spaces since 1913 and had been incorporated in 1919, voted to build their own edifice in February 1929. They laid the cornerstone on October 9, 1929, and finished the building in December. In the latter part of the 20th century membership declined, so in 2002, the congregation decided to sell its building and merge with Fourteenth Church of Christ, Scientist, Seattle. The building is listed as a Seattle Landmark.

The building is now the Sanctuary at Admiral and is a venue for weddings and banquets.
