= The Wayne and The Waldorf Apartments =

- U.S. National Register of Historic Places
- New York State Register of Historic Places
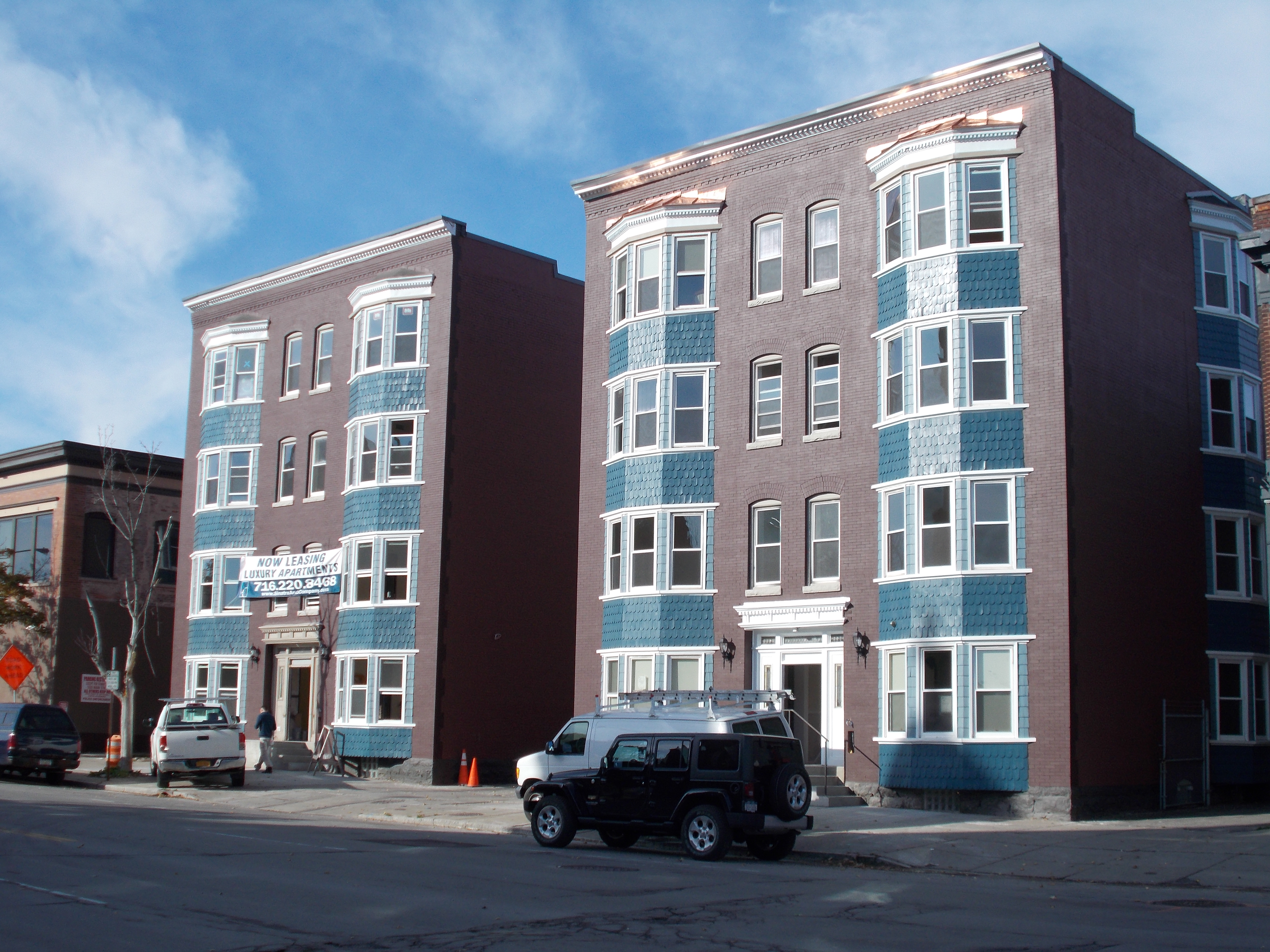
- The Wayne and The Waldorf Apartments, October 2014

- Location within New York Location within the United States
- Location: 1106 Main St., Buffalo, New York
- Coordinates: 42°54′20″N 78°52′30″W
- Area: .53 acres (0.21 ha)
- Built: c. 1897
- Architect: William H. Archer
- Architectural style: Colonial Revival
- NRHP reference No.: 14000912
- NYSRHP No.: 02940.001280, 02940.001281

Significant dates
- Added to NRHP: November 12, 2014
- Designated NYSRHP: September 17, 2014

The Wayne and The Waldorf Apartments are two historic apartment buildings located in downtown Buffalo, Erie County, New York. They were built about 1897, and are twin four-story, three-bay, painted brick buildings with modest Colonial Revival style detailing. Each building houses four apartment suites, or “flats” per floor for a total of 16 apartment units. The buildings are situated along Waldorf Place, a small private lane running between the two. The buildings have been renovated.

It was listed on the National Register of Historic Places in 2014.
