= SS San Mateo =

- U.S. National Register of Historic Places
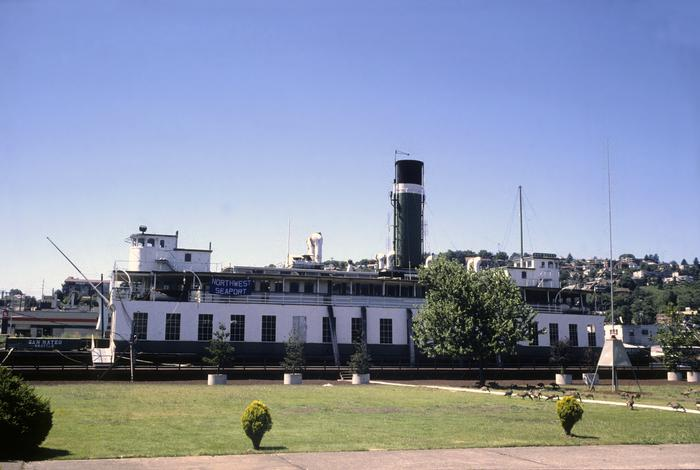
- 1975, docked at Lake Union, Seattle
- Location: Seattle waterfront, Seattle, Washington
- Area: less than one acre
- Built: 1922
- NRHP reference No.: 71000876
- Added to NRHP: April 7, 1971

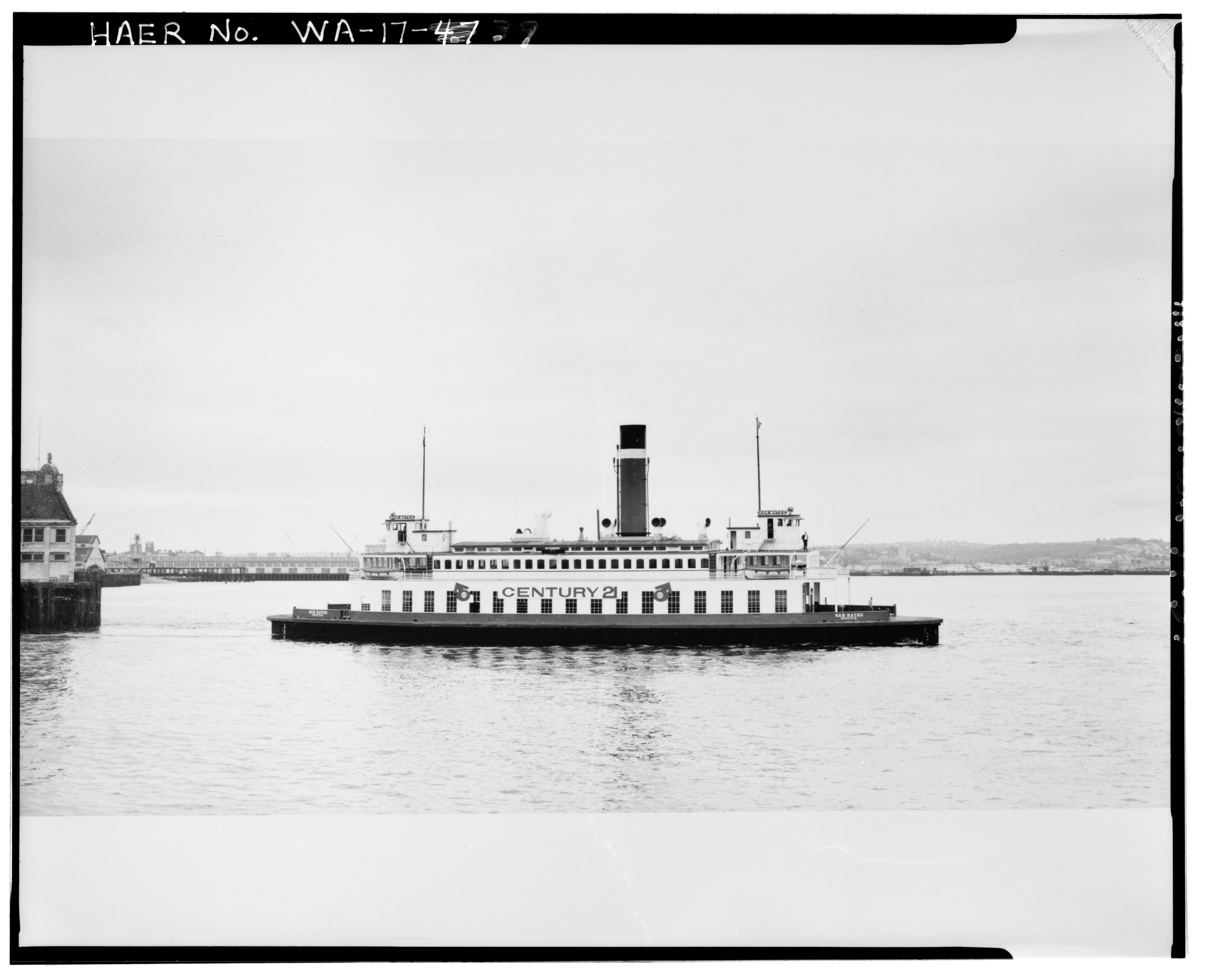
1964 photo

SS San Mateo was a steamship ferry operating on the west coast of the United States. Launched in 1922, she served until 1940 in San Francisco Bay, operated by the Southern Pacific Golden Gate Ferries. In 1941 she was acquired by the Puget Sound Navigation Company, and then operated on Puget Sound until its retirement in 1969. At the time of her retirement she was the last operating vehicular steam ferry in the United States. After attempts to restore her for display in a Seattle waterfront park, she was acquired by a Canadian businessman and towed in 1992 to the Fraser River in British Columbia. The vessel became part of a small collection of derelict ferries. There she was partially scrapped; portions of her hulk are still visible in the river, and readily apparent on satellite photos, as of 2021. A photo at the dock in July 2021 shows her hulk partially or fully aground, and leaning toward the former BC Ferries Sidney-class ferry MV Queen of Sidney.

The ship was listed on the National Register of Historic Places in 1971.
