= St. Joseph's Church (Seattle) =

Catholic Church in Seattle, Washington, U.S.

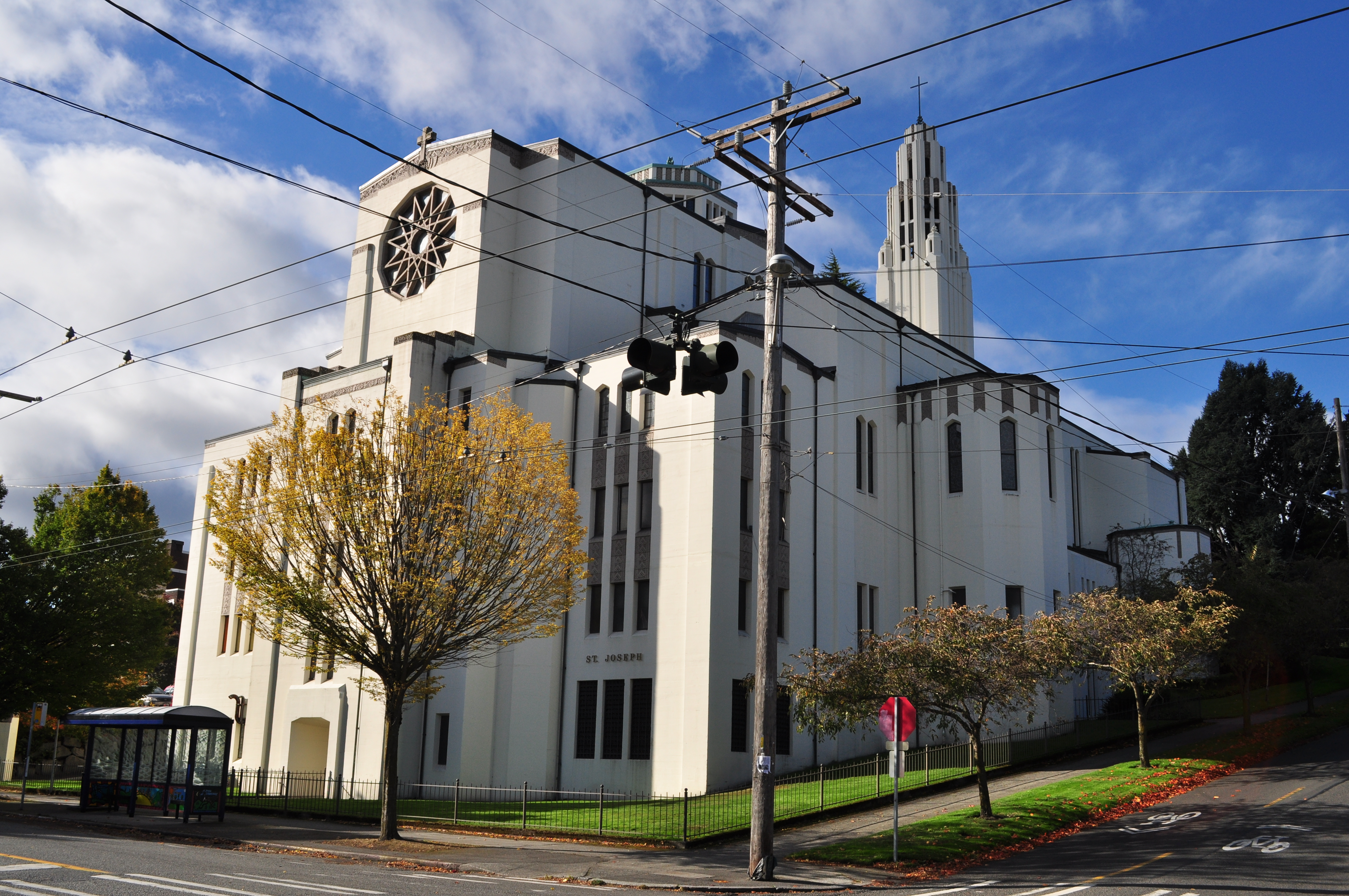
- The church's exterior, 2012
- St. Joseph's Church
- 47.626124°N 122.308152°W
- Location: 732 18th Ave E Seattle, Washington
- Denomination: Catholic
- Religious order: Society of Jesus
- Website: Official website

History
- Dedicated: April 21, 1907

Architecture
- Heritage designation: Seattle Landmark
- Designated: March 31, 1980
- Architect: A.H. Albertson
- Architectural type: Art deco
- Years built: 1930

Administration
- Archdiocese: Seattle
- Deanery: South Seattle

St. Joseph's Church is a Catholic church in the Capitol Hill neighborhood of Seattle, in the U.S. state of Washington. It is part of St. Joseph's Parish, within the Archdiocese of Seattle and is a ministry of the West Province of the Society of Jesus (Jesuits). It has been designated a city landmark by the Seattle Landmarks Preservation Board.

== History ==
St. Joseph's Parish was established in 1907. Early parishioners were predominantly working-class second generation Irish Americans. In the 1920s, a new church building, a granite-faced Gothic church was planned but scaled back due to the Great Depression. The current building was built in 1930. The church removed its statues in 1965 in the spirit of Vatican II and developed an increasingly social justice oriented character.

St. Patrick's Parish in Portage Bay was merged into St. Joseph's in 2022. In 2024, as part of the Archdiocesan "Partners in the Gospel" merge plan, St. Joseph's was partnered with St. Therese Parish in Madrona. The parishes intend to merge by the end of the 2020s.

=== LGBTQ ministry ===
Under the leadership of Archbishop Raymond Hunthausen, priests in Seattle have historically been accepting of lesbian and gay Catholics. St. Joseph's Parish is located in Seattle's gay neighborhood and has been at the center of this support. In 1983, Hunthausen hosted a DignityUSA conference at nearby St. James Cathedral. Dignity is a group that advocates for change in the Catholic Church's stance on homosexuality. Throughout the 1980s and 1990s, St. Joseph's Church hosted the Seattle chapter of Dignity and celebrated a weekly LGBTQ mass. This ended in 2001 due to pressure from the archdiocese. Although Dignity is no longer active in the parish, St. Joseph's has an active LGBTQ ministry, aiming to provide an inclusive and supportive community for LGBTQ parishioners and the neighborhood.
