= Victorian Apartments =

- U.S. National Register of Historic Places
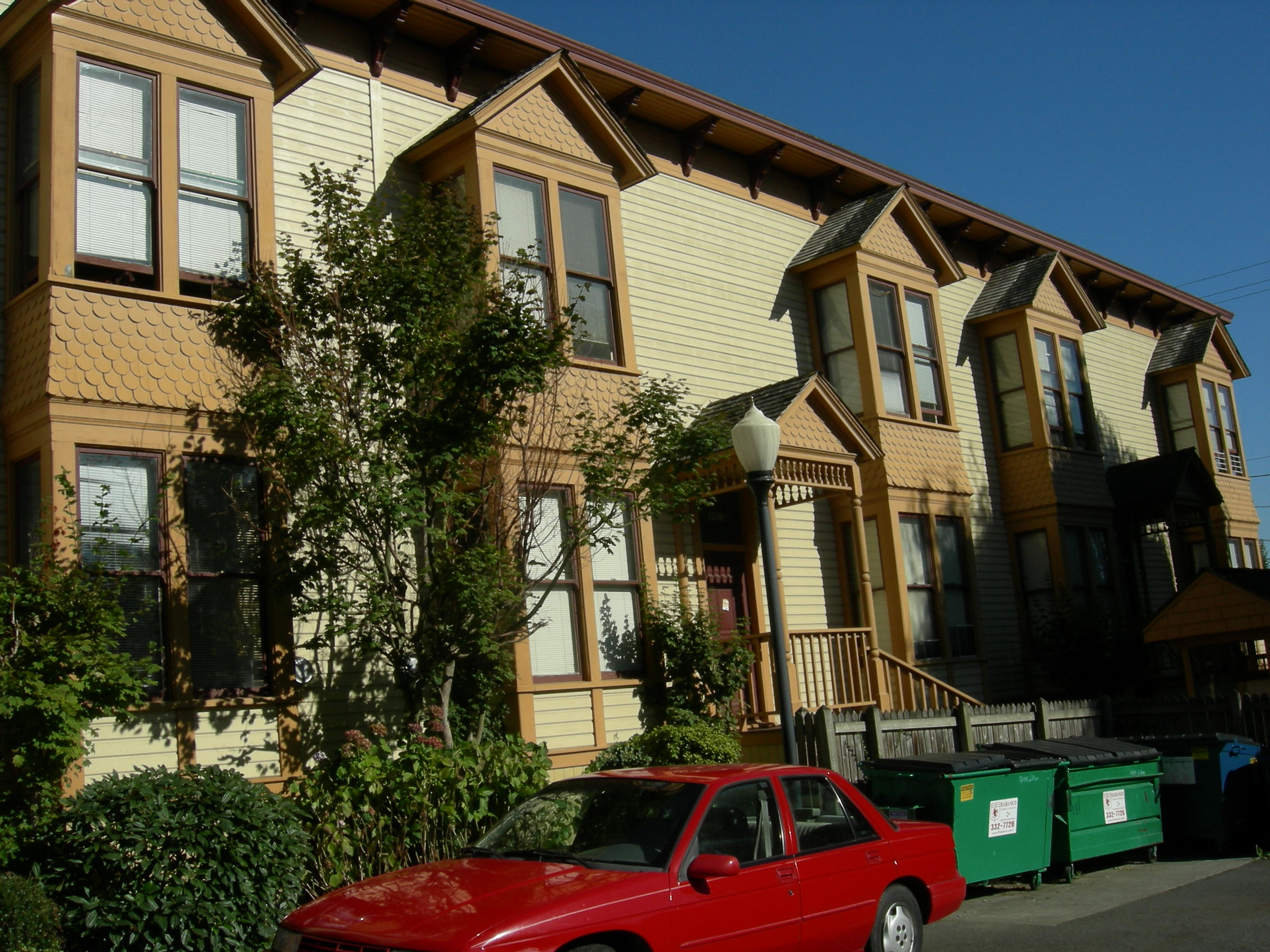
- Looking southeast

- Location within Downtown Seattle
- Location: 1234-1238 S. King St., Seattle, Washington
- Coordinates: 47.5986°N 122.3156°W
- Area: less than one acre
- Built: 1891
- Architectural style: Late Victorian, Vernacular Victorian
- NRHP reference No.: 90001864
- Added to NRHP: December 18, 1990

The Victorian Apartments, now called the Victorian Row Apartments, is a historic apartment building located at 1234-1238 S. King Street, Seattle, Washington. It was listed on the National Register of Historic Places in 1990.

== History ==
The building was constructed in 1891 at the corner of South 10th Avenue (then called 12th street) and Weller Street. It featured a Late Victorian style, and provided accommodation for families in the residential area around the Pioneer Square business district. Seattle was then in a period of rapid growth as its population increased from 10,000 in the mid 1880s to 42,000 by 1890.

A major regrading project was begun in 1907 in the Jackson Street area. The intent was to flatten the streets to improve access to the downtown district, in some cases reducing the street gradients from 15 percent to 5 percent. Most of the buildings in the area were demolished, but a few were relocated to just outside the regrade area, as was the Victorian Apartments building in 1908.

Originally unnamed, the building became known as the Victorian Apartments because of its uncommon design for the area, and in 1979 became a designated City of Seattle Landmark under the name Victorian Row Apartments. It was added to the National Register of Historic places on December 18, 1990 as Seattle's only remaining unaltered pre-1900 structure of its type.

== Architecture ==
The building is a modest rendering of the Late Victorian style, but was more distinguished than some other low and mid range accommodations in the area. The building is rectangular, approximately 60 feet by 113 feet, two stories high.

Only the west facade adds flair to the structure, where six square two-story windows and three porches project out from the wall, each topped by a gable roof with fish scale shinglework. The porches feature spindlework friezes and turned posts.

== Restoration ==
The building had deteriorated by the 1980s. In 1990, Historic Seattle, a preservation and development agency, with the help of federal tax credits, rehabilitated the building to create 14 units of affordable housing. The property was owned and operated by Historic Seattle and managed by Bellwether Housing until November 24, 2025, when the Seattle Chinatown International District Preservation and Development Authority (SCIDpda) took over ownership and management.
