= The Sanctuary (Seattle) =

Former church in Seattle, Washington, U.S.

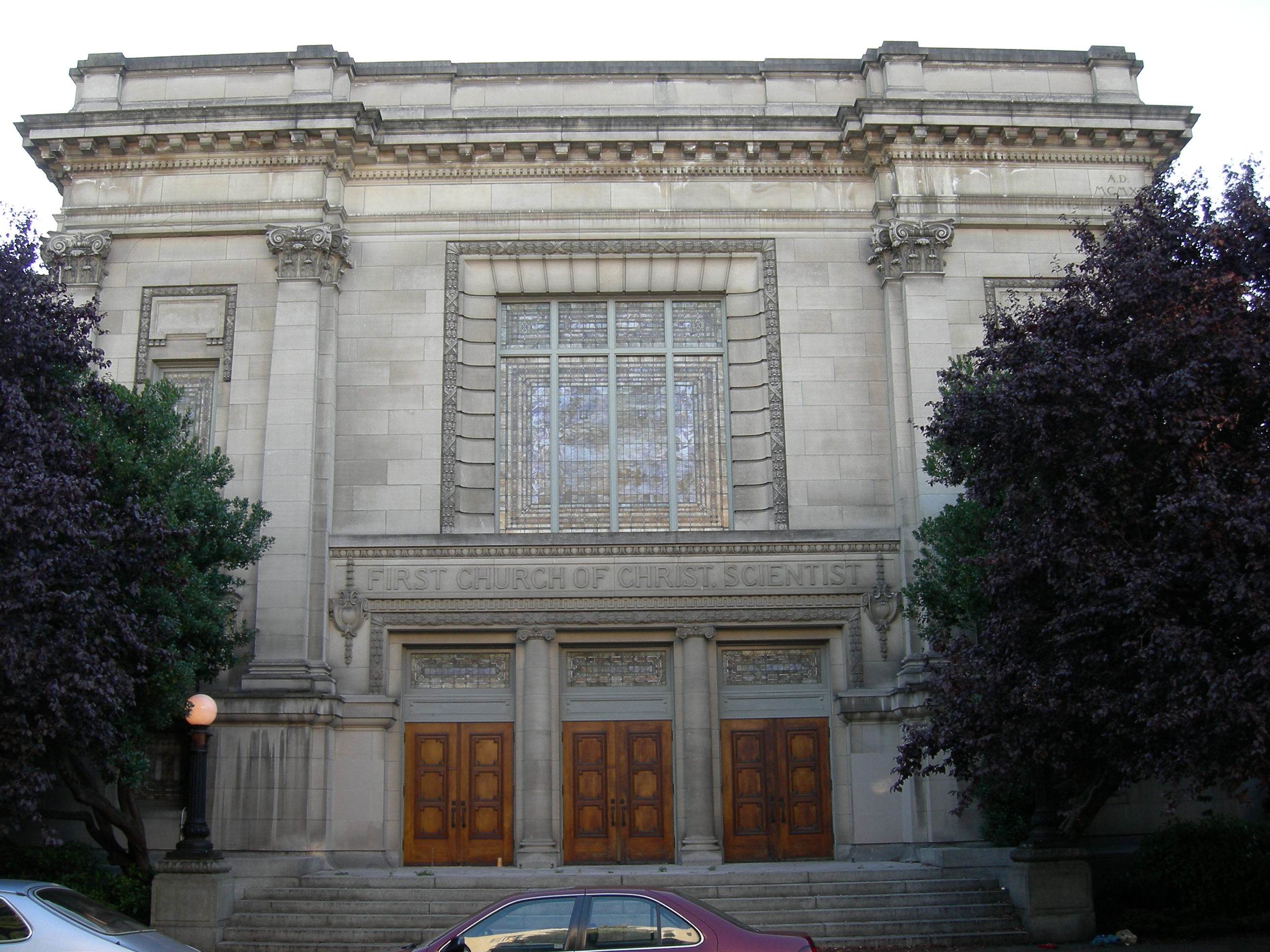
- 16th Avenue facade
- Interactive map of the The Sanctuary area

General information
- Architectural style: Classical Revival
- Location: United States
- Coordinates: 47°37′06″N 122°18′42″W
- Construction started: 1906
- Completed: 1909?
- Client: First Church of Christ, Scientist

Design and construction
- Architects: Bebb & Mendel

The Sanctuary is a townhouse project located at 1519 East Denny Way / 1841 16th Avenue on the corner of East Denny Way and 16th Avenue in the Capitol Hill neighborhood of Seattle, Washington. It was created out of an historic church building known as First Church of Christ, Scientist, Seattle.

== History ==
Designed in the Classical Revival style, the church was built of Bedford limestone. Construction began around 1906. Established in August 1896, the congregation of First Church first held services in various rented buildings or halls until building its first church edifice on the corner of 6th Avenue and Marion Street. This was completed in time for its first service on Easter Sunday, April 7, 1901. This was soon outgrown and in November 1906 a contract was signed to purchase the Denny Way property. In August 1908, services began in a temporary wooden structure that was built on the completed foundation of the new church.

On January 17, 1977, the building was declared a City of Seattle historic landmark. In 2006 the congregation made the decision to move to the South Lake Union neighborhood to be in a more active urban location; the building on East Denny Way was sold to a developer who has since converted it into townhouse project called The Sanctuary. First Church of Christ, Scientist, Seattle, now holds services at 900 Thomas Street and is still an active branch of the Christian Science Mother Church.

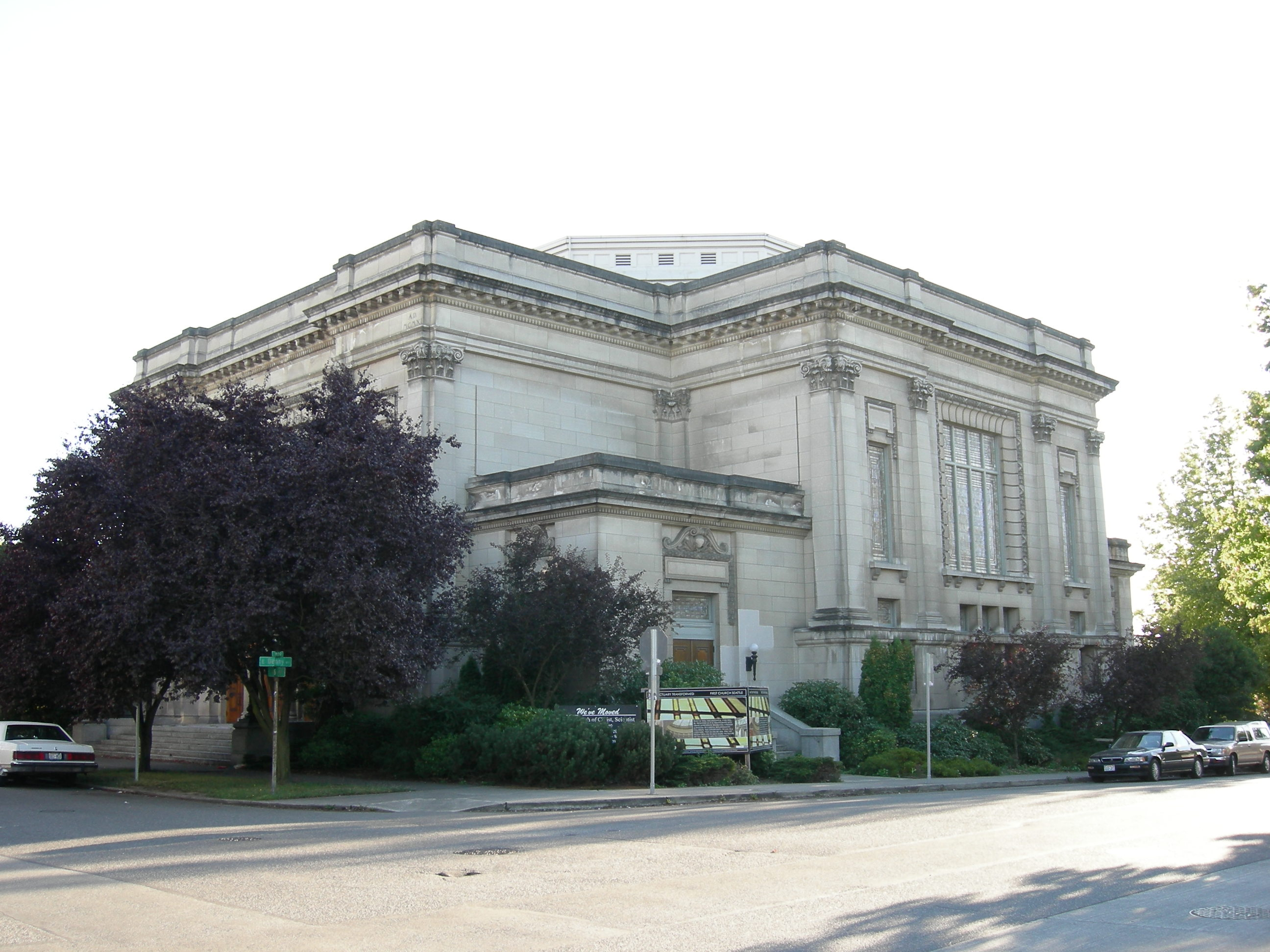
The Denny Way entrance
