= Queen Anne Boulevard =

Boulevard in Seattle, Washington, U.S.

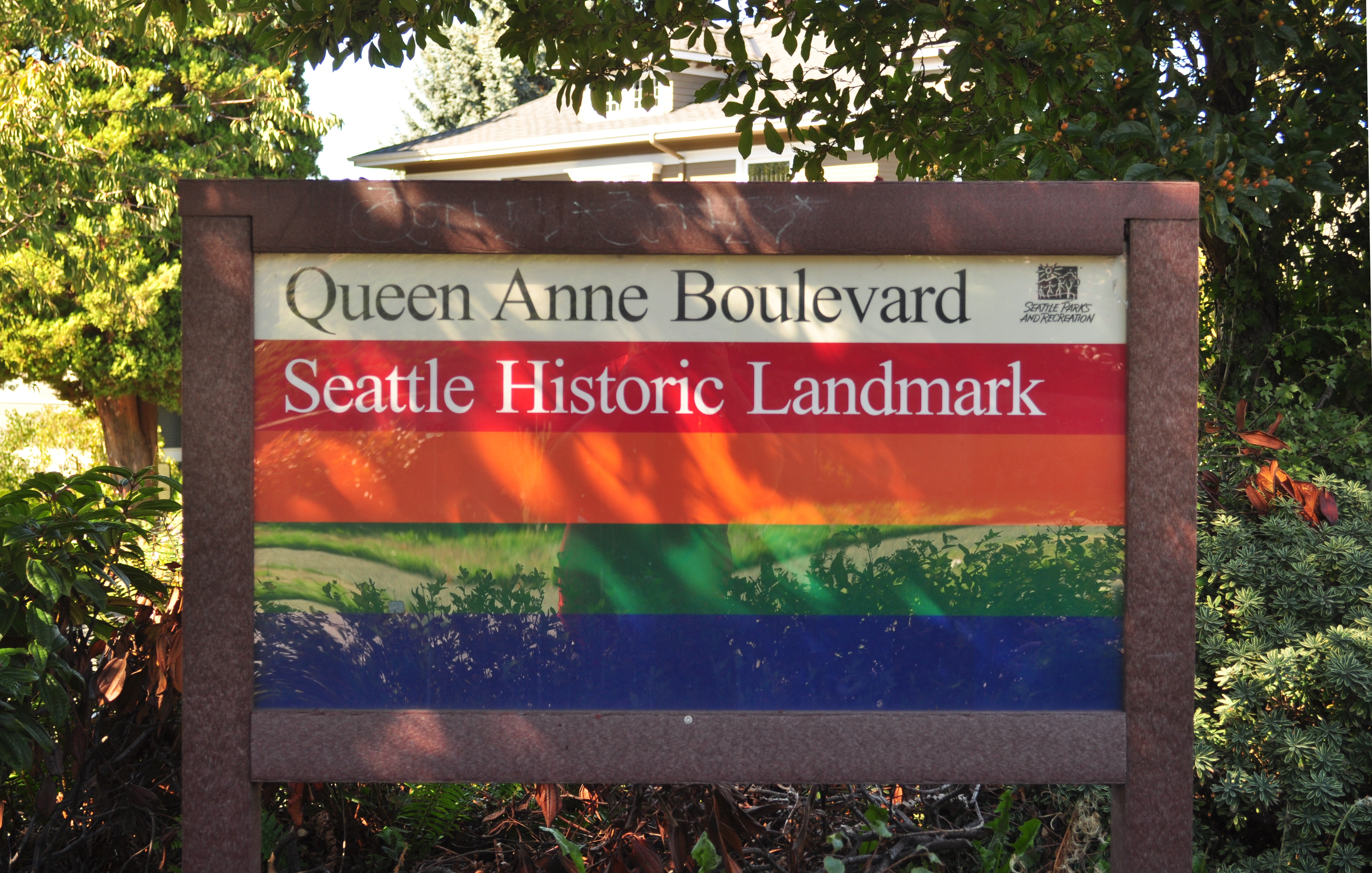
- Department of Parks & Recreation sign for Queen Anne Boulevard, Seattle, Washington, U.S.
- Interactive map of Queen Anne Boulevard
- Length: 6.0 km (3.7 mi)
- Coordinates: 47°37′46″N 122°21′19″W

Construction
- Commissioned: 1907
- Construction start: 1911
- Completion: 1916

Queen Anne Boulevard is a 6.0-kilometre (3.7 mi) loop atop Seattle, Washington's Queen Anne Hill. It is a City of Seattle landmark. Authorized in 1907 and built from 1911 to 1916, it incorporates parts of 5th, 7th, 8th and 10th Avenues West; Bigelow Avenue North; West Blaine, McGraw, Wheeler, Fulton and Raye Streets; Smith, McGraw, and Wheeler Streets; West Highland Drive; and West McGraw and McGraw Places.

== History ==
By 1906, the southern portions of Queen Anne Hill were already well connected to downtown Seattle by streetcar routes, but portions of the hill remained relatively inaccessible. The local community club approached the Parks Board to propose a scenic route ringing the hill. The Park Board was not initially enthused. The proposed route was not part of the then recently developed "Olmsted Plan" for Boulevards and Parkways, and the proposed route along standard city streets did not seem to offer the 150-foot (46 m) width that had been established as a standard for boulevards, to allow park-like landscaping.

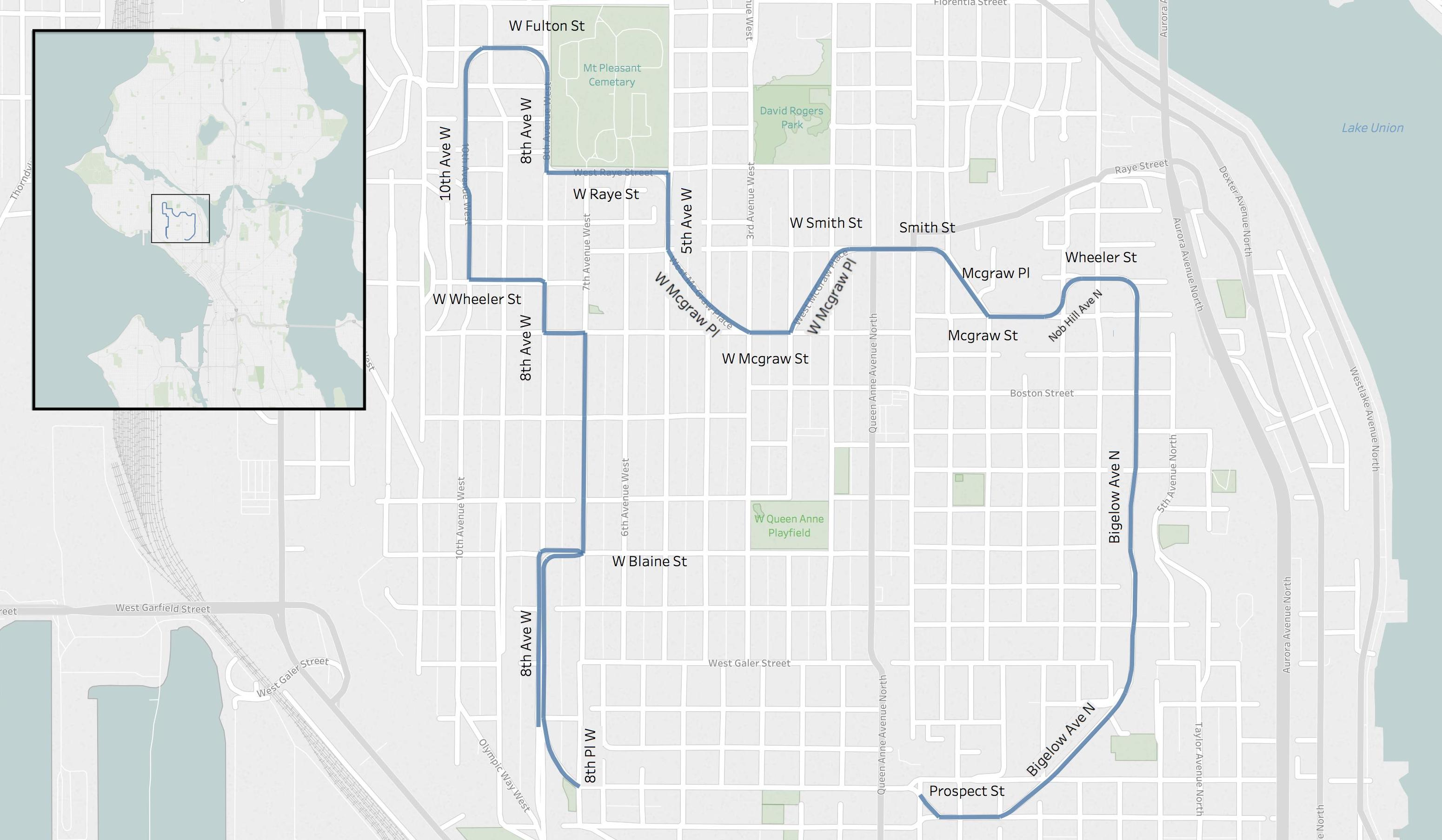
Route of Queen Anne Boulevard in blue

On the other hand, nearly the entire route offered spectacular views. A deal was struck: the community would agree to pay for the private property that would have to be obtained to widen the streets (including land that would need to be filled or excavated); City Engineer R. H. Thomson would be responsible for contracts and would deal with any necessary regrading of cross streets; the boulevard would eventually be transferred to the jurisdiction of the Park Department, which would landscape and surface the street. A 1907 ordinance authorized this plan and in 1908 it was incorporated into the Olmsted Plan, but in 1910 the project was still mired in lawsuits over land condemnation.

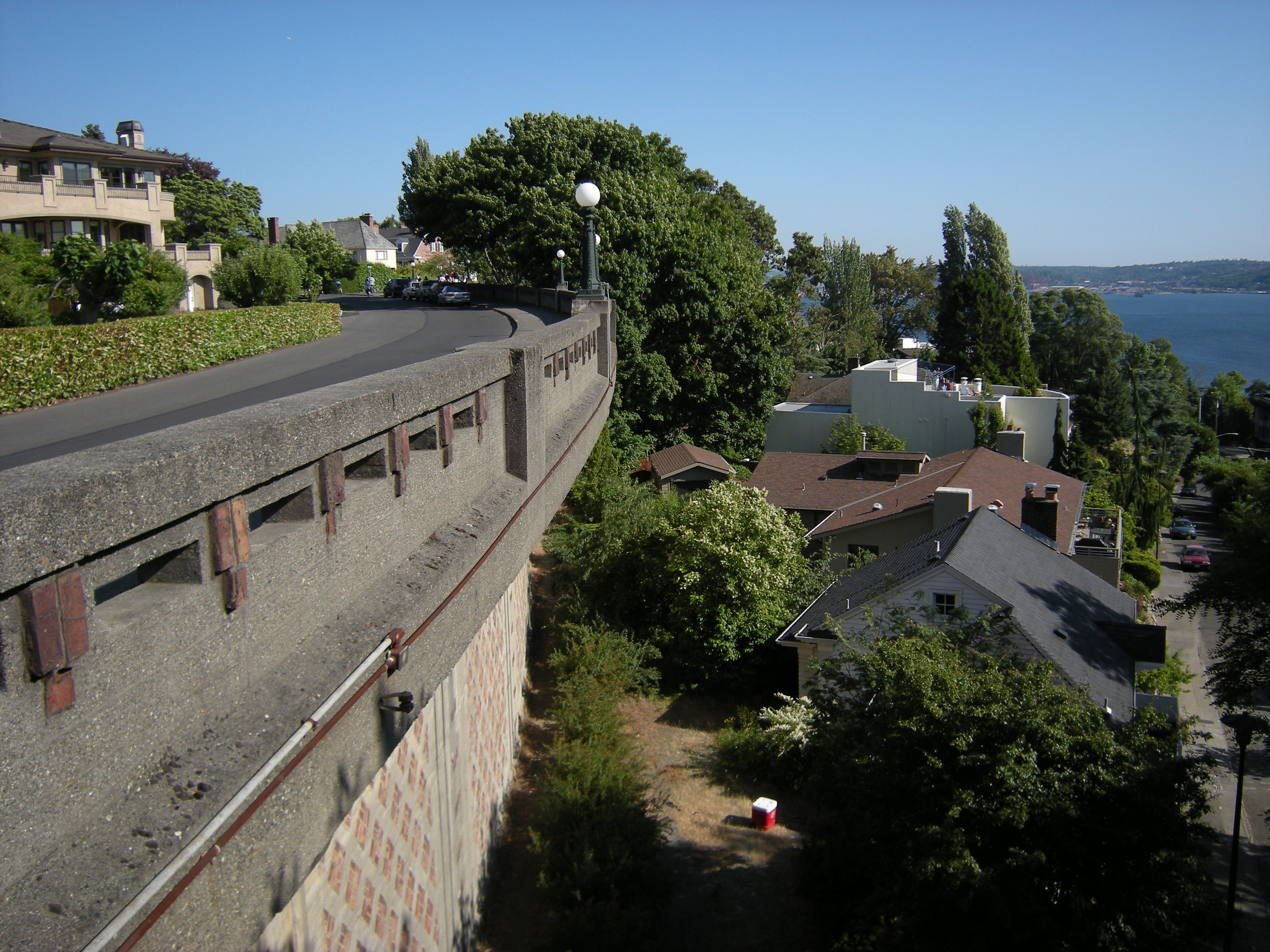
Part of Queen Anne Boulevard can be seen here, running just inside the West Queen Anne walls

The transfer to the Park Department occurred in 1911; work finally began, and was completed in 1916. Maples, sycamores, oaks, elms, cottonwoods, chestnuts and other trees were planted along the route. This combination of roadway and park, vistas and improved transportation to privately owned land, was not a complete success. New construction impeded many of the views (as did the trees); tree roots attacked sewer lines; sidewalks heaved up to irregular angles as trees outgrew parking strips and shaded houses and yards more than was generally considered desirable. The Parks Department did approve some tree removals, always at the expense of the adjacent landowner.

In 1942 the roads (but not the landscaping) were transferred from Parks to the City Engineer's office. A 1952 proposal by the City Engineer and the Planning Commission to revert the route to "standard" street status was turned down by the City Council.

== Current Use ==
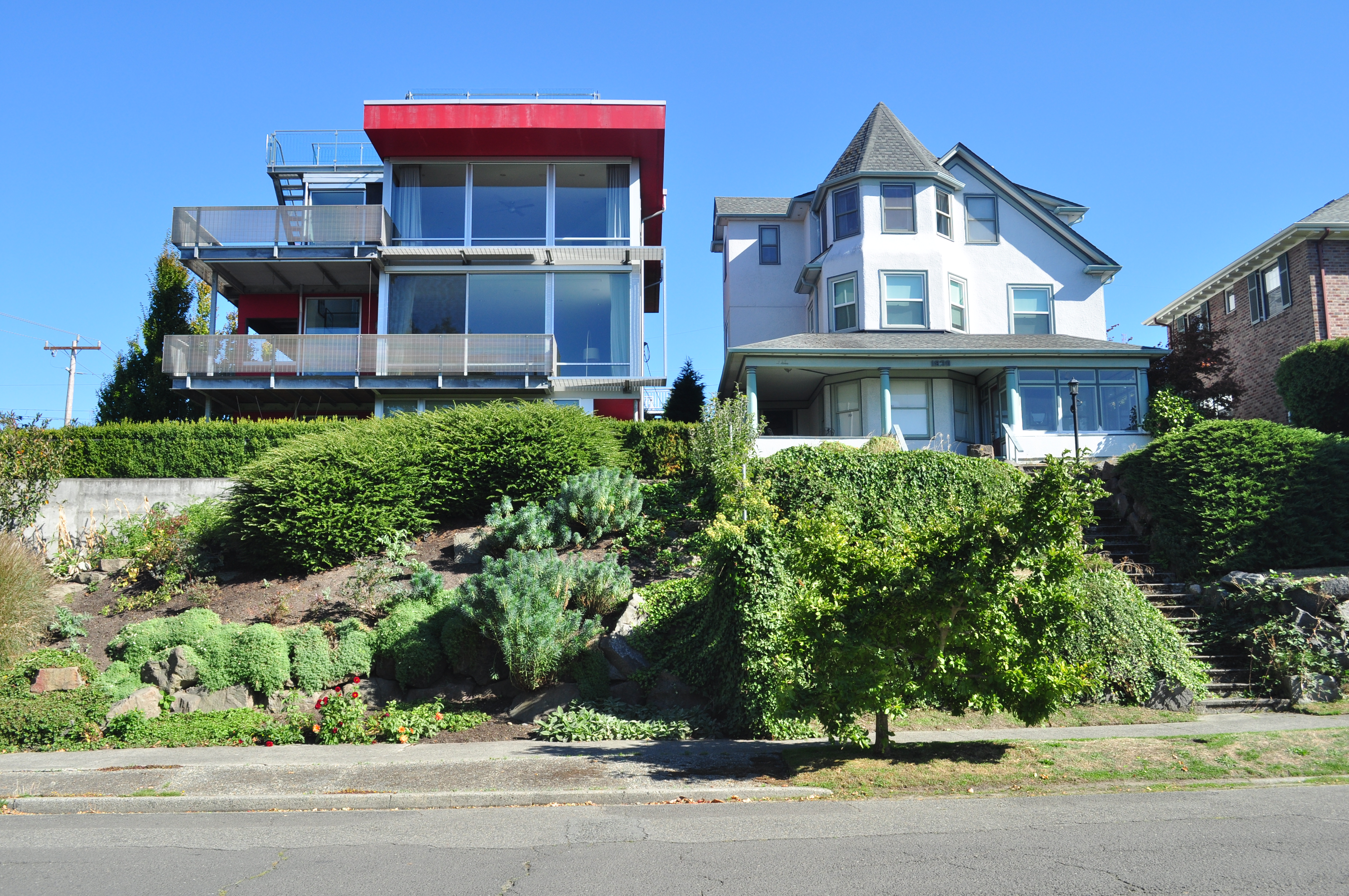
Houses on 7th Avenue West along Queen Anne Boulevard offer a contrast of old and new.

Parks and Engineering continue each to have responsibilities relative to the boulevard, resulting in occasional inter-departmental squabbling. Nonetheless, the boulevard continues to be recognized as a vital part of the Queen Anne neighborhood, "The Crown of Queen Anne", an "urban trail and needed recreational amenity … appreciated by many Queen Anners and visitors for a diverse variety of uses" both for "automobile access to Upper Queen Anne neighborhoods" and as "a recreational and aesthetic amenity… used at all hours… The Boulevard offers shade in the summer, beautiful autumn color in the fall, and an open and sunny landscaped path in the winter."

Every July beginning in 1986, the Queen Anne Helpline, a neighborhood social services agency, has sponsored the Crown of Queen Anne fun run on the boulevard. The race runs clockwise, starting near the Mt Pleasant Cemetery and finishing at Coe Elementary School.

As of 2008 recent, current, and proposed improvements for the boulevard include improving sidewalks and making sure that there is a sidewalk on at least one side of the boulevard throughout its length, adding signage that will indicate the boulevard route, creating "friendly" crossings where the boulevard intersects other major roads, better managing trees and other plants, adding "period sensitive and pedestrian scale" lighting to improve safety while still retaining the boulevard's historic character, removing encroachments, and better enforcing parking laws.

== Route ==
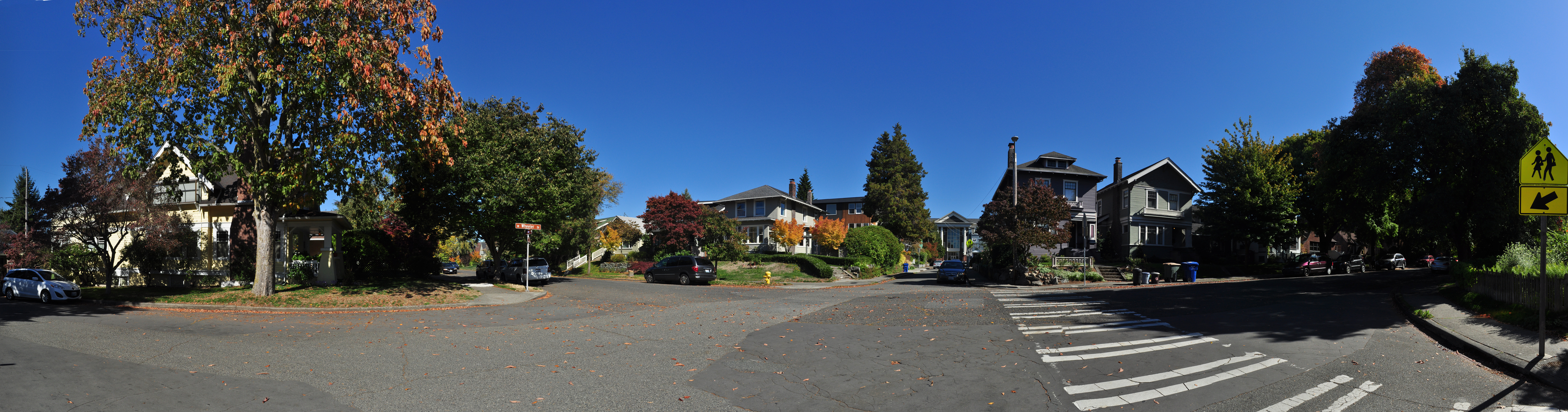
One of the many turns of Queen Anne Boulevard, here from W Wheeler Street (at left) to 8th Ave W (at right). The roughly 270° panorama here is looking slightly north of east; the Coe School can be seen cutting off W Wheeler Street slightly right of center.

The 1907 city ordinance establishing the boulevard describes it as "extending from Prospect Street between Warren Avenue and Second Avenue North, in a northeasterly direction, to an intersection with Galer Street near Bigelow Avenue; thence northerly following the general direction of Bigelow Avenue as nearly as the contours of the ground will permit, to Wheeler Street; thence westerly to Nob Hill Avenue; thence southerly to McGraw Street; thence westerly to Second Avenue North; thence northwesterly to Smith Street, west of Warren Avenue; thence westerly along Smith Street to a point east of First Avenue West; thence southerly to McGraw Street and Second Avenue West; thence westerly to Third Avenue West; thence northwesterly to Fifth Avenue West and Smith Street; thence northerly to Ray Street; thence westerly to Eighth Avenue West; thence northerly to West Armour Street; thence northwesterly to West Fulton Street; thence westerly to Ninth Avenue West; thence southwesterly to Tenth Avenue West and West Armour Street; thence southerly to West Wheeler Street; thence easterly to Eighth Avenue West; thence southerly to McGraw Street; thence easterly to Seventh Avenue West; thence southerly to Blaine Street; thence westerly to Eighth Avenue West; thence southerly to West Lee Street; thence southeasterly to West Highland Drive and Seventh Avenue West…" West Highland Drive itself completes this as a loop.
