= Danish Brotherhood in America Headquarters =

Historic building in Omaha, Nebraska

- Danish Brotherhood in America National Headquarters Building
- U.S. National Register of Historic Places
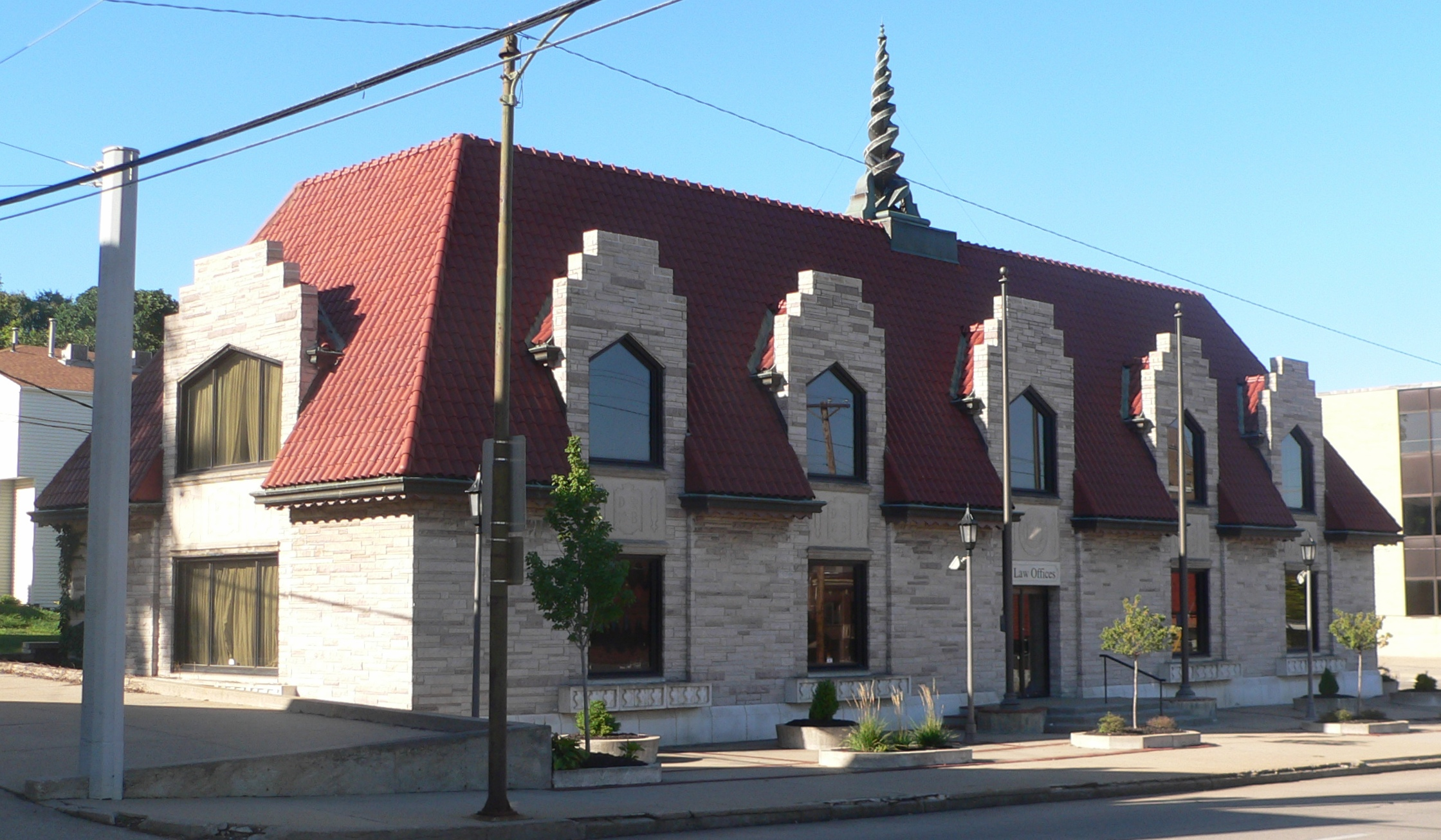
- The front of the building in 2016

- Location within Nebraska Location within the United States
- Location: 3717 Harney St., Omaha, Nebraska 68131
- Coordinates: 41.257052540718696°N 95.96862452047102°W
- Built: 1966
- Architect: Edward Sessinghaus
- Architectural style: Postmodern, National Romantic style
- NRHP reference No.: 16000480
- Added to NRHP: July 22, 2016

The Danish Brotherhood in America Headquarters is a building located in the Midtown neighborhood of Omaha, Nebraska, and listed on the National Register of Historic Places. The Danish Brotherhood in America was an ethnic fraternal organization and insurance company.

== History ==
The Danish residents of Omaha established the benevolent society in 1882. In 1966, the group had the office building built as the headquarters for their life insurance program.

In 2014, the group sold the building just before their insurance division merged with Woodmen of the World to form the Assured Life Association. Attorney Mike Goodman, with a partner owned the building from 1994 to 2015. Dundee Bank bought the building in 2015 for the loan processing center and renovated the building. In 2016, the National Register of Historic Places listed the building based on the distinctive architecture.

== Architecture ==
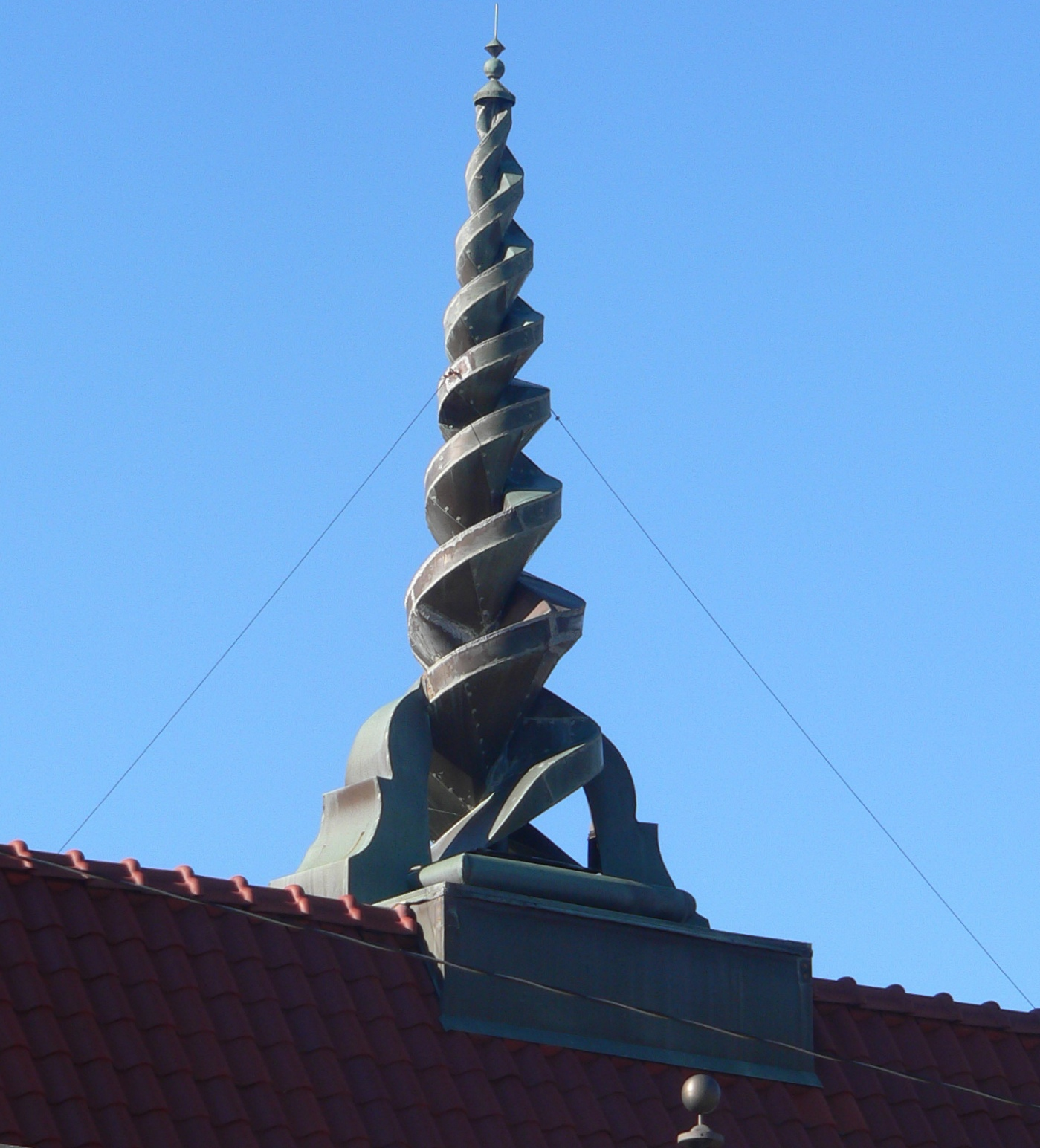
The spire evoking dragon tails

The organization hired Omaha architect Edward Sessinghaus to design the two-story structure, based on his extensive experience designing distinctive buildings, such as the Sokol Auditorium. By this point he was semi-retired, so Teig & Johnson was the architect's firm of record. He used a postmodern interpretation of the National Romantic style to emphasize the group's Scandinavian heritage.

The exterior has a hipped roof made of red terra cotta tiles and ashlar stone walls with a water table encircling the base of the building. Five bays are created by stepped parapet style dormer windows. There are carved stones with the organization's crest over the front door and a stylized "DB" between the windows.

The most prominent feature on the exterior of building is a green screw-shaped spire on the roof. The copper feature is inspired by the Børsen building, a 17th-century stock exchange in Copenhagen, Denmark, where a more elaborate spire is meant to represent intertwined dragon tails.

The interior includes a main boardroom with wood-paneled walls and ceiling with intricately carved moldings. The foyer has a terrazzo floor with Tennessee marble walls and a mirrored ceiling.

== See also ==
- Columbia Hall (Dannebrog, Nebraska)
- Washington Hall (Seattle)
- National Register of Historic Places listings in Douglas County, Nebraska
