= On the Boards =

US non-profit organisation

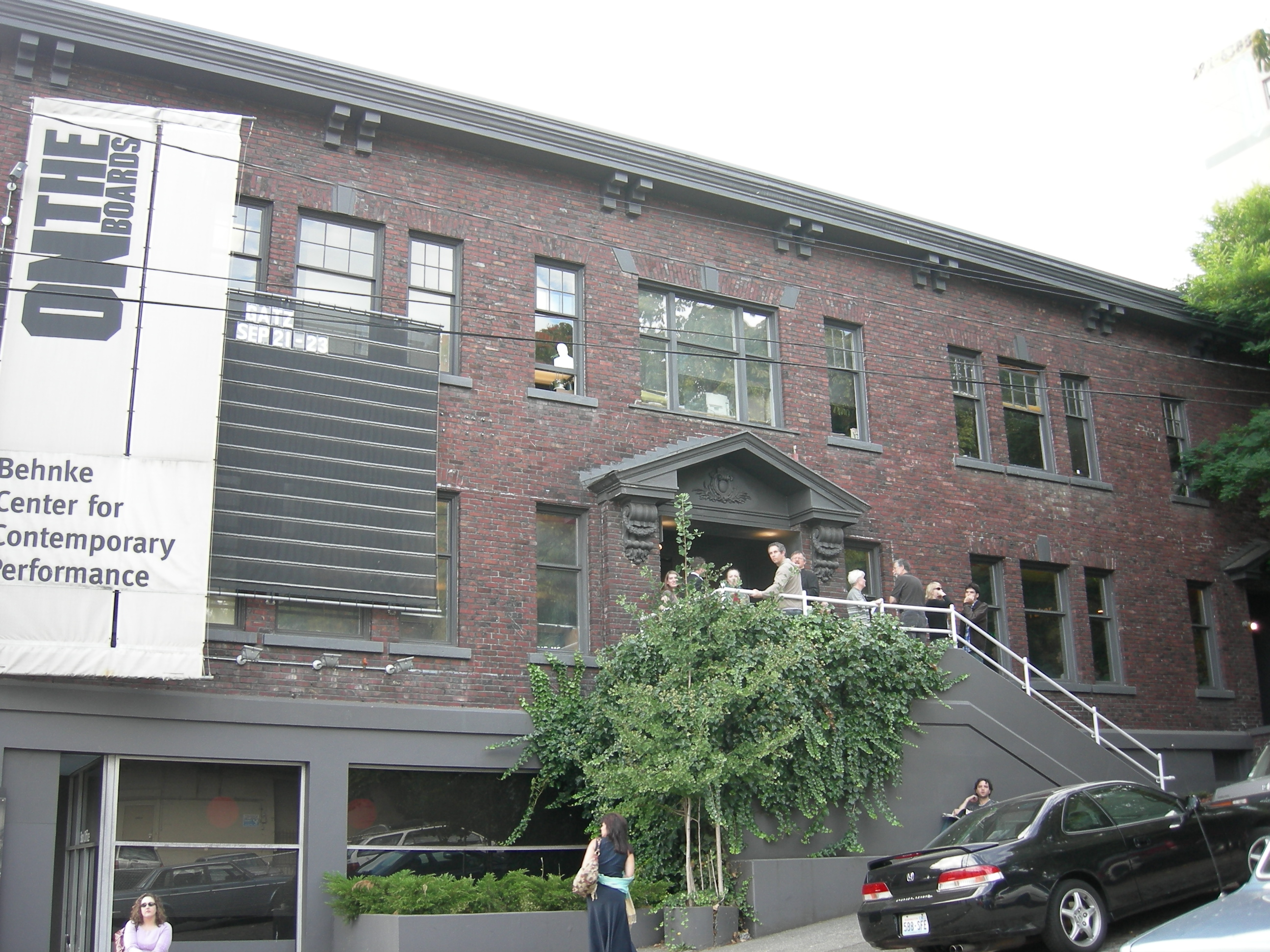
- On The Boards/Behnke Center for Contemporary Performance, 2007
- Formation: 1978
- Type: Performing arts
- Location: Seattle, Washington, U.S.
- Website: ontheboards.org

On the Boards (OtB) is a non-profit contemporary performing arts organization in Seattle, Washington, founded in 1978. Originally located at Washington Hall in the Central District, the organization moved in 1998 to their current location in Uptown. They present more than 40 distinct shows annually, amounting to over 100 performance nights each year in 2 theater spaces.

== Venues ==
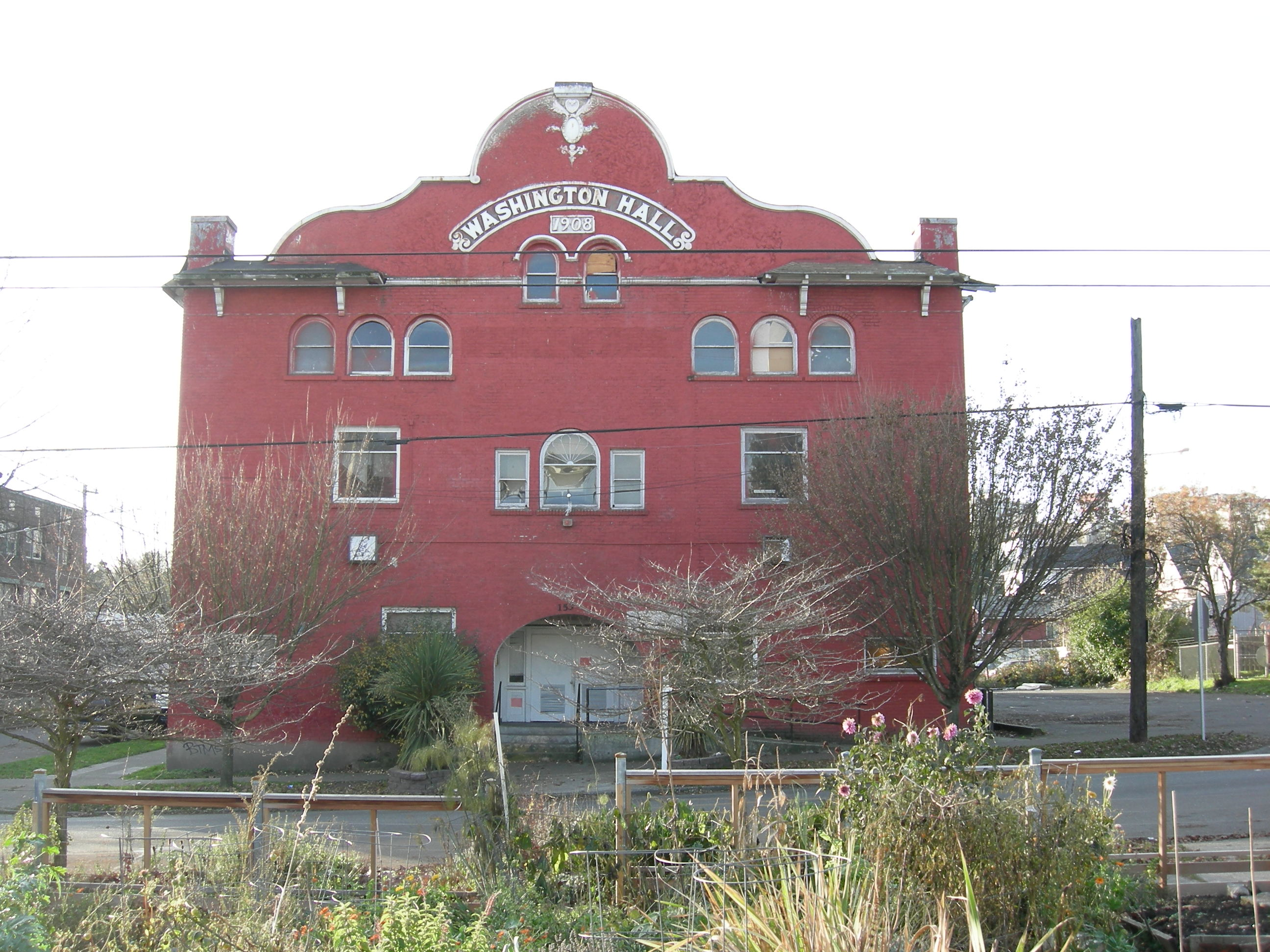
Washington Hall (2007).

On the Boards began its existence renting the upstairs theater space at Washington Hall from the Sons of Haiti. Washington Hall is a 1908 building whose history prior to OtB included appearances by W. E. B. Du Bois and Martin Luther King Jr. and performances by the likes of Count Basie and Mahalia Jackson. In this space, OtB presented such visiting performers as Eiko and Koma, Ping Chong, Meredith Monk, and Spaulding Gray, as well as early work by local choreographers including Mark Morris and Pat Graney, both of whom went on to gain national and international acclaim. As of 2008, the building is in poor shape and quite likely facing demolition.

In 1998, OtB moved to its current location. Built in 1912, the building was originally known as Redding Hall, then later as Queen Anne Hall. It had been the long-time home of A Contemporary Theater (ACT), who were moving to a downtown home at Kreielsheimer Place / Eagles Auditorium. OtB had the space remodeled into the 300-seat Merrill Wright Mainstage Theater and an 84-seat Studio Theater. The building is now known as On The Boards/Behnke Center for Contemporary Performance.

== Performances presented ==
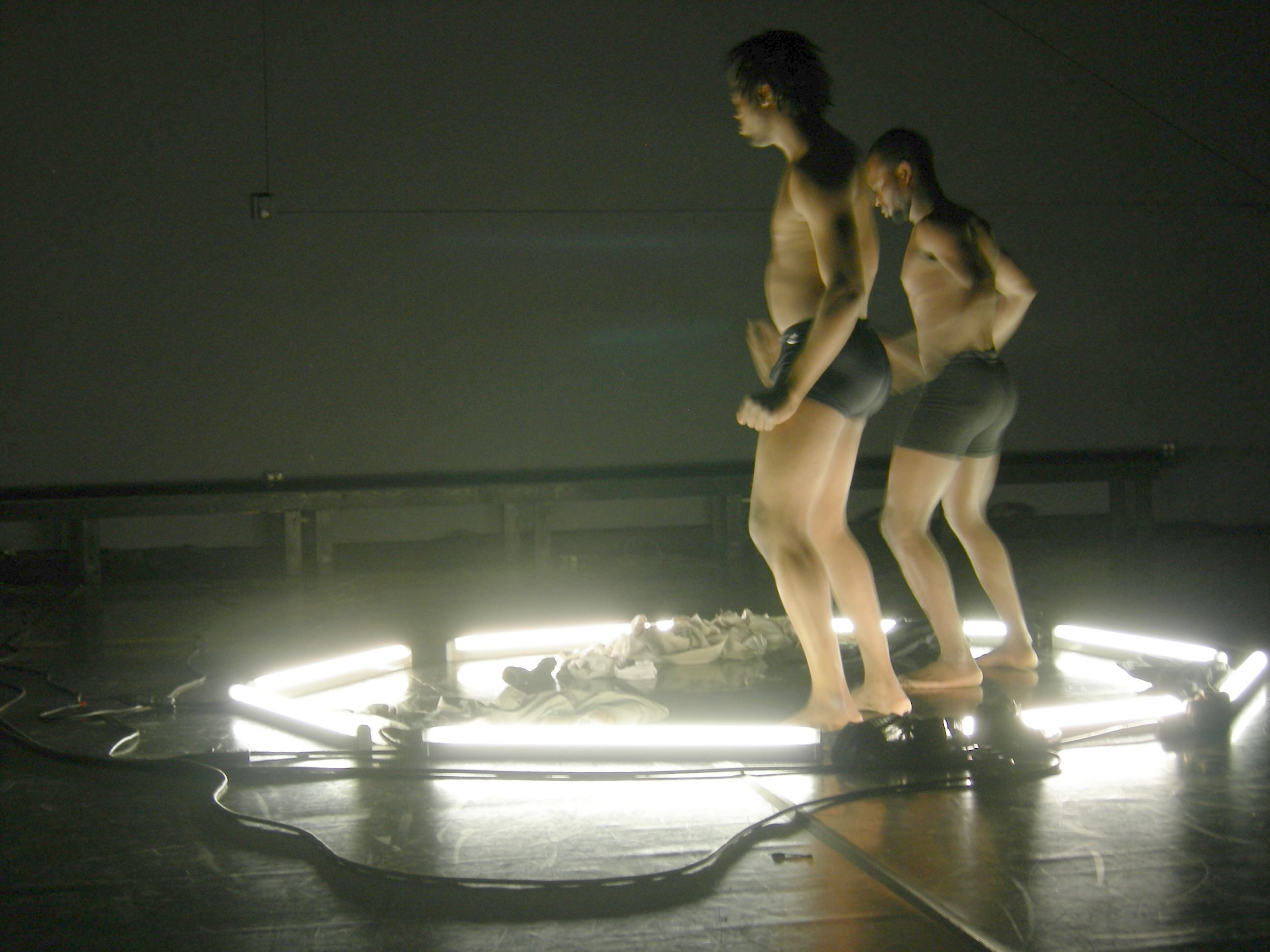
Congolese dance theater troupe Studios Kabako with the participation of dancer/choreographer Faustin Linyekula at OtB in November 2007.

As of 2008, OtB's performances are divided into several program series. The Inter/National Series presents artists from around the world; the Northwest Series focuses more locally in the Pacific Northwest; 12 Minutes Max is a monthly performance-lab/showcase of short new works and works-in-progress; and the Northwest New Works Festival is an annual 2-week festival of world premiere contemporary performances by Northwest-based artists and ensembles.

Besides the artists mentioned above, other national and international performers and acts who have appeared at OtB include Bill T. Jones, The Wooster Group, dumb type, Needcompany, Sankai Juku, and Anne Teresa de Keersmaeker, as well as such Seattle-area performers and acts as 33 Fainting Spells, Sarah Rudinoff, Maureen Whiting Company, Seattle Chamber Players, Allen Johnson, locust, "Awesome", and Washington Ensemble Theater.

In 2010, On the Boards launched a video streaming service, OntheBoards.tv for high-quality recordings of contemporary performance works.
