= Columbia Hall (Dannebrog, Nebraska) =

- U.S. National Register of Historic Places
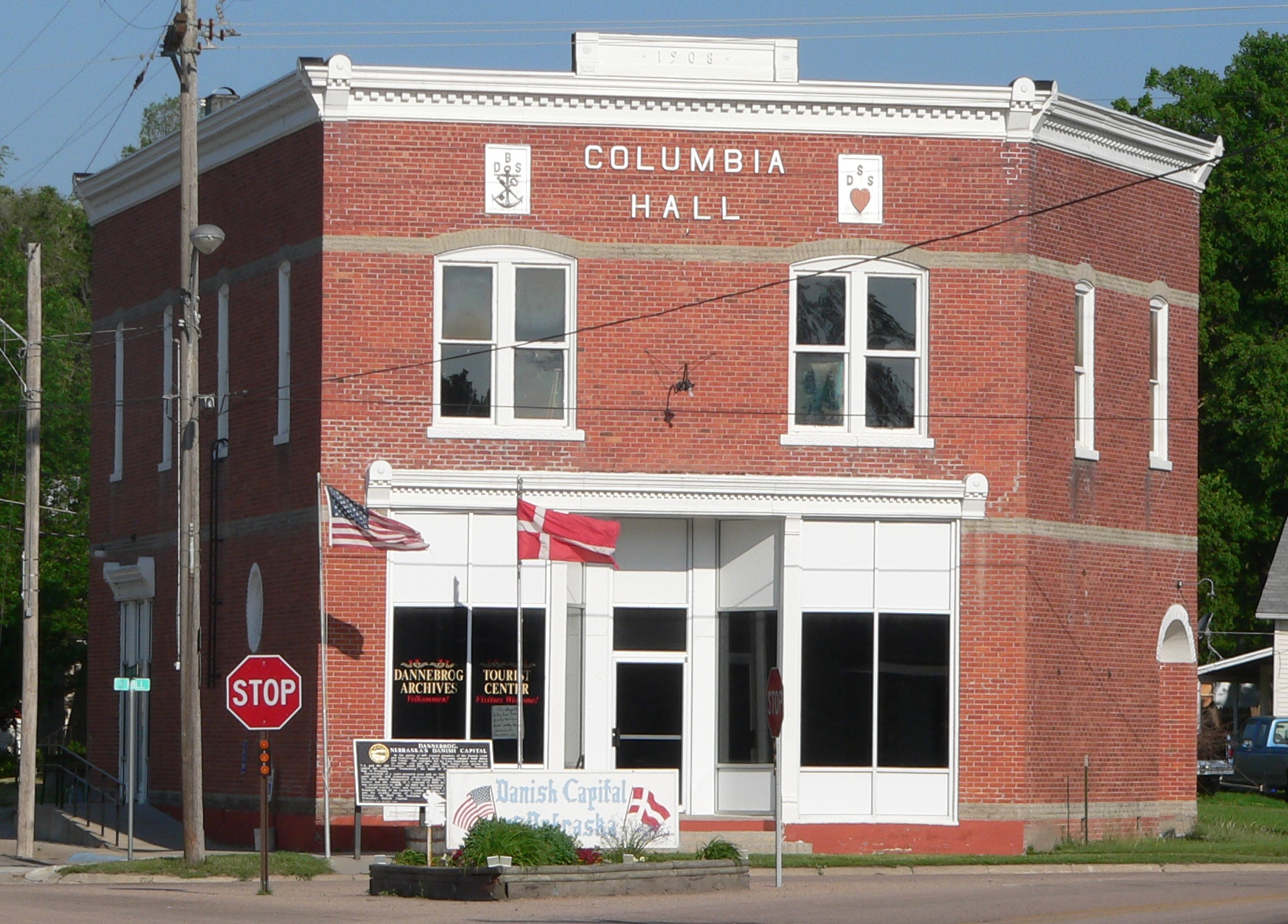

- Location within Nebraska Location within the United States
- Location: Jct. of NE 58 and W. Roger Welsch Ave., Dannebrog, Nebraska, United States
- Coordinates: 41°07′06″N 98°32′50″W
- Built: 1908
- NRHP reference No.: 05000724
- Added to NRHP: July 22, 2005

Columbia Hall, also known as NEHBS #HW04-056, is an historic building located in Dannebrog, Nebraska, United States that was built in 1908. It was listed on the National Register of Historic Places on July 22, 2005. The building was built by the Danish Brotherhood in America to serve as a meeting hall for the Danish community and the building currently serves as a tourist center and hosts an archive on Danish American history.

== See also ==
- Washington Hall (Seattle)
- Danish Brotherhood in America Headquarters
