= OntheBoards.tv =

Live performance video streaming service

- Website type: Video streaming service
- Owner: On the Boards
- Revenue: Profit-sharing with artists
- Website: www.ontheboards.tv
- Registration: Optional (Pay-per-view, download, or subscription)
- Launched: January 2010
- Current status: Active

OntheBoards.tv is an online streaming video service for contemporary performance, theater, and dance. Launched in 2010, the platform records and distributes recordings with pay-per-view, video download, and video streaming options.

== History ==
On the Boards is a theater in Seattle with high-definition video recording capabilities. Their online video streaming service, OntheBoards.tv, provides pay-per-view screenings of international theater and dance performances. The service launched in January 2010 as a three-year pilot with funds from the Wallace Foundation and DanceUSA as an alternative to low-quality theater recordings shot from the back of the house and rarely distributed. OntheBoards.tv offers rental prices and annual subscriptions. Artists receive a share of the profits.

By early 2010, the service had seven works. One production, The Shipment by Young Jean Lee, was filmed at On the Boards' Seattle theater with four high-definition cameras and an audio technician, and its video edited, with the playwright's input, by a Seattle production company. Other artists on the platform include Ralph Lemon and Tanja Liedtke, and other venues that have filmed performances include Performance Space New York, the Portland Institute for Contemporary Art, and the Fusebox Festival.

The recordings are shot from points of view around the theater to make film adaptations of live experience rather than a documentation point of view. The production of such recordings tends to be too expensive to be accessible to contemporary performing artists, leaving little opportunity for preservation or distribution beyond a limited run, even as performances can take months to develop and provide minimal compensation or recognition.

The service sought to provide an archival medium for performance and market share for the arts in response to other video streaming services without performance. OntheBoards.tv's artistic director said that the act of recording and sharing is a way of asserting cultural importance, and while he deems live theater a "paramount" experience, was interested in exploring live art in the mediated experience of video streaming. The service also had self-reflexive impact on performance, as one company changed its work in response to viewing the recording and another artist noted how recordings tended to make a definitive version of a performance when part of the medium is the variation from each show's performers and audience. The service also introduced issues of copyright, misappropriation, business models, and sharing clips out of context.

A 2014 review in The New York Times found the video streaming quality to be uneven, and preferred to pay for and watch the show's single-download version. As of 2017, more than 100 universities and viewers across 157 countries had used the service.
