= Springwell Danish Cemetery =

Historic cemetery in Douglas County, Nebraska, US

- Location within Nebraska
- 41°18′41″N 96°00′36″W
- Location: Omaha, Nebraska

History
- Built: 1889

Omaha Landmark
- Designated: April 2, 1996

The Springwell Danish Cemetery is located at 6326 Hartman Avenue in North Omaha, Nebraska. First used in 1868, this cemetery was formally established in 1889 by Danish immigrants. It was designated an Omaha Landmark in 1996.

== About ==
The Springwell Danish Cemetery was established on a 10-acre (40,000 m^{2}) tract of land northwest outside of Omaha. Visitors would travel through Benson to the end of the streetcar line, and then walk to the cemetery.

The oldest grave in the cemetery belongs to Lars Jocumsen, and is marked by an obelisk that dates from 1868. Jocumsen was a farmer in the area. Among the notable Omaha Danes buried at Springwell Cemetery is Col. Sophus Neble.

== See also ==
- Danes in Omaha, Nebraska
- List of cemeteries in Omaha
- Landmarks in Omaha, Nebraska
