= Old Georgetown City Hall =

- U.S. National Register of Historic Places
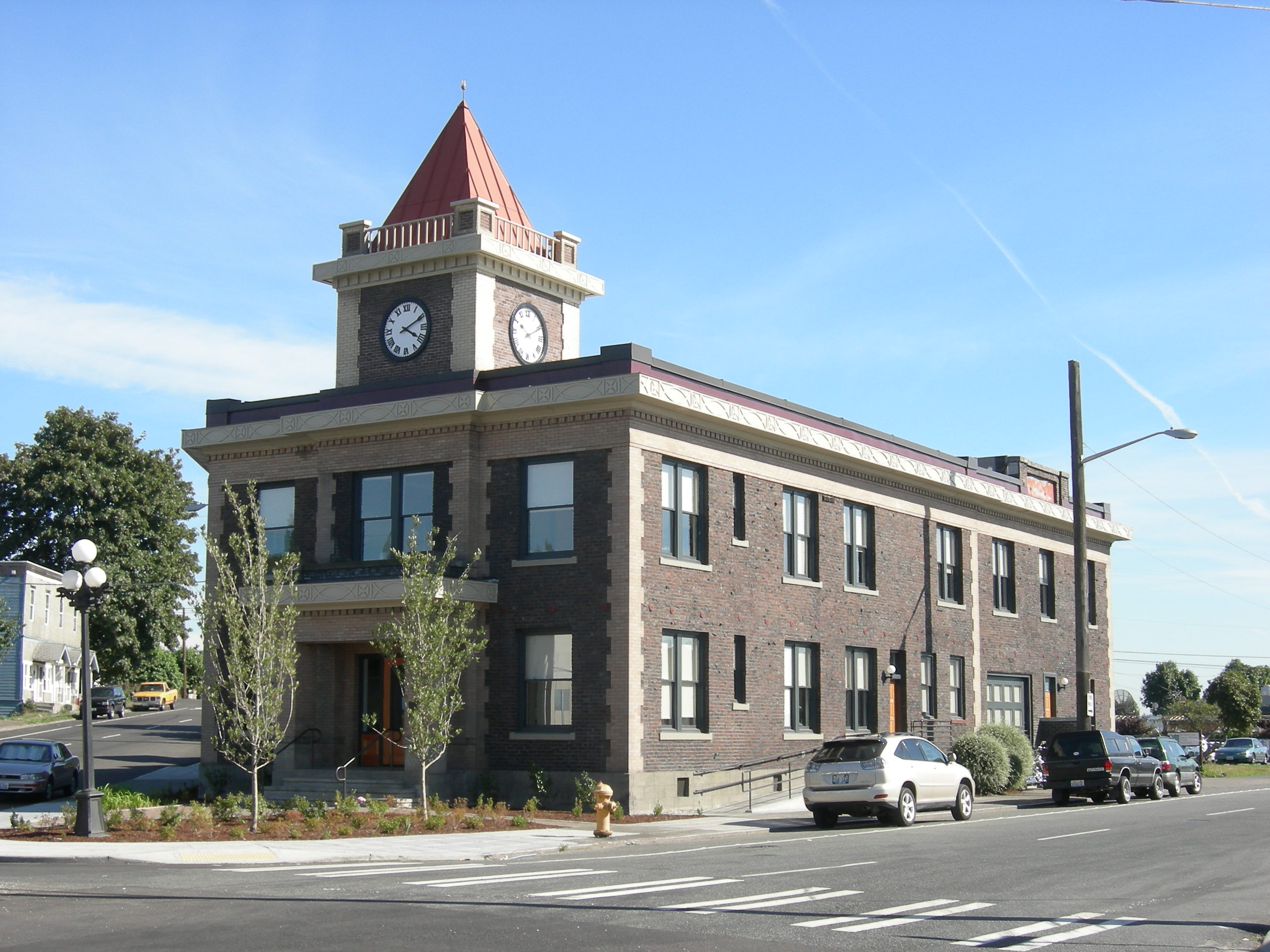
- Old city hall building in 2007

- Location within Washington (state)
- Location: 6202 13th Ave., S., Seattle, Washington
- Coordinates: 47°32′52″N 122°18′53″W
- Area: less than one acre
- Built: 1909
- Architect: Voorhees, V. W.
- NRHP reference No.: 83003342
- Added to NRHP: April 14, 1983

The Old Georgetown City Hall, also known as Georgetown Police Station, is a two-story brick construction building designed by Victor W. Voorhees in the Georgetown neighborhood of Seattle, Washington that was built in 1909.

It was designed to include a police court, a jail, fire department, council chambers, and offices for mayor, engineer, and treasurer. It was to be the first building in Georgetown with hot and cold running water. Georgetown was annexed into Seattle in 1910.

It was listed on the National Register of Historic Places in 1983.

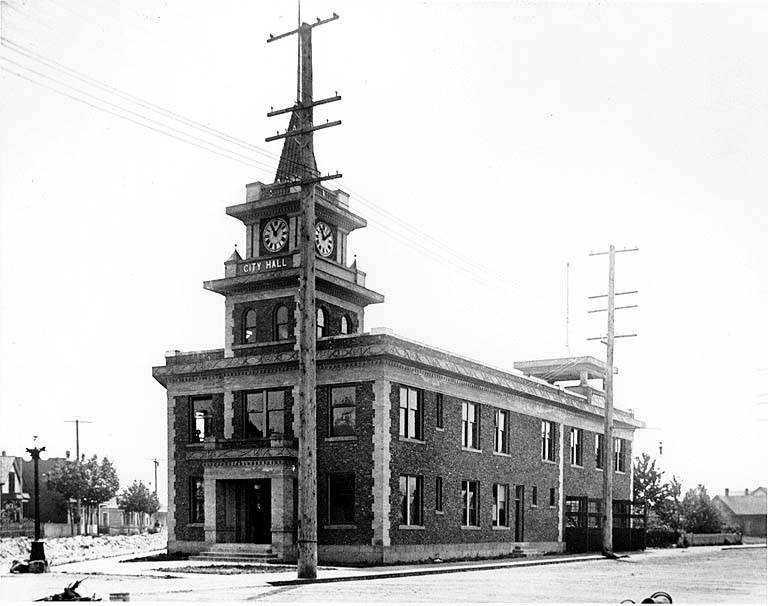
City Hall circa 1910

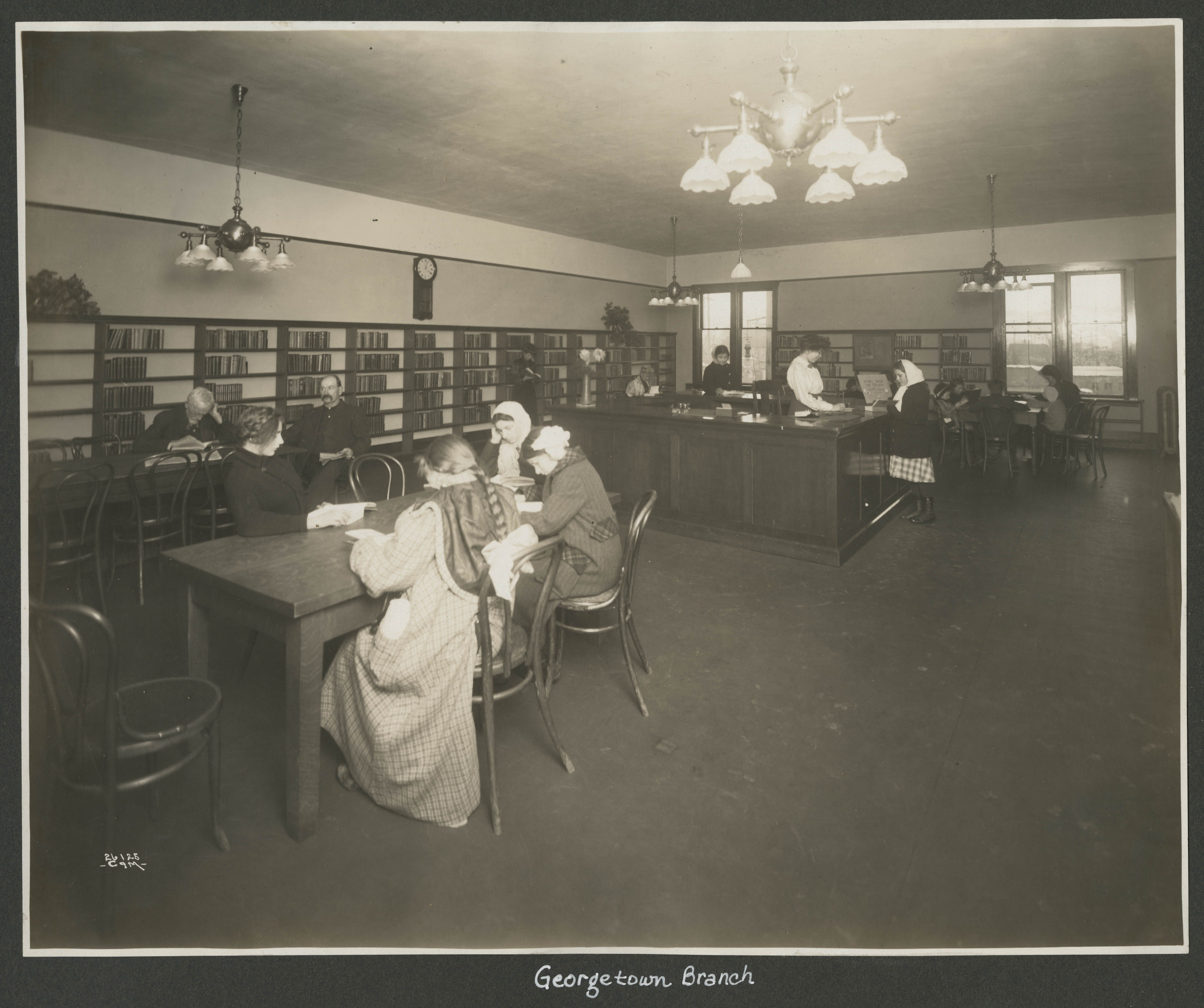
Georgetown Library in the city hall building in 1912
