= Roger Welsch =

American author and folklorist (1936–2022)

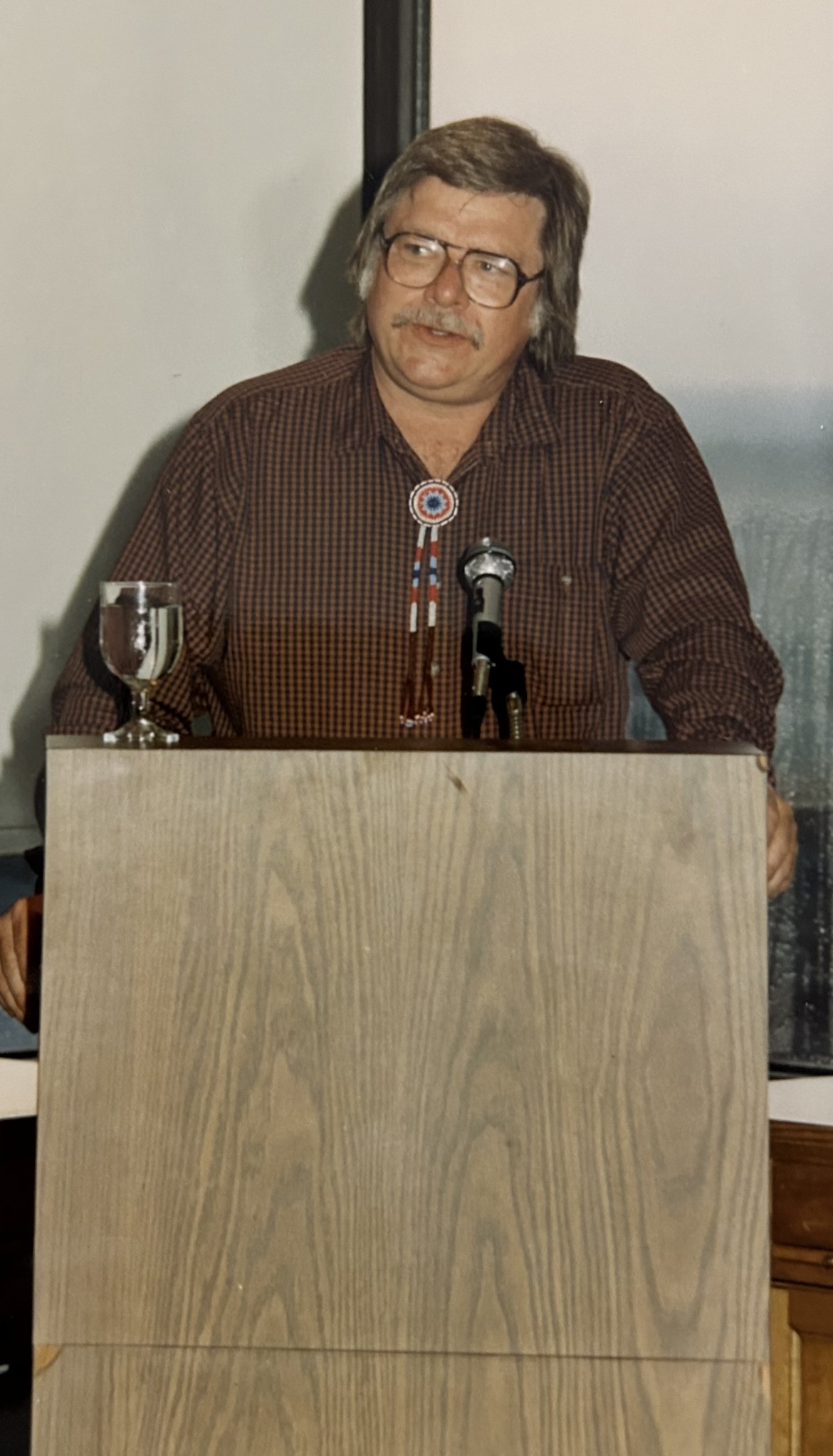
- Welsch in the 1990s
- Born: November 6, 1936; Lincoln, Nebraska, U.S.
- Died: September 30, 2022 (aged 85) near Dannebrog, Nebraska, U.S.
- Occupations: Author, folklorist, humorist, television personality, activist
- Spouses: Marilyn Henry (m. 1958; div. 1975) Linda Welsch (m. 1980)
- Children: 4

Roger Lee Welsch (November 6, 1936 – September 30, 2022) was an American author, humorist, folklorist, and news correspondent best known for his work on CBS News Sunday Morning. Born in Lincoln, Nebraska, Welsch was the only child of Christian Welsch and Bertha (Flach) Welsch. He later settled outside Dannebrog, Nebraska.

Welsch earned both his bachelor's degree (1958) and master's degree (1960) in German from the University of Nebraska and pursued further studies in folklore at the University of Colorado and Indiana University. His academic career included teaching English and Anthropology at Nebraska Wesleyan University, Dana College, and the University of Nebraska.

In the 1970s and 1980s, Welsch appeared on Charles Kuralt's “On the Road” segments for CBS News. From 1988 to 2001, he became a familiar face as the presenter of “Postcards from Nebraska” on CBS News Sunday Morning, sharing stories that celebrated rural life and Midwestern culture. Beyond television, Welsch authored numerous books and articles and contributed to several documentaries, cementing his reputation as a leading voice in American folklore.

His contributions earned him recognition, including the Henry Fonda Award from the State of Nebraska Travel and Tourism Division in 2005.

In 2007, Roger and Linda Welsch returned their 60 acres (24 ha) of land along the Loup River near Dannebrog to its original owners, the Pawnees, inspiring other local White land-owners to make similar exchanges. He became an honorary member of the Pawnee, Omaha, and Oglala nations.

Welsch died on September 30, 2022, at the age of 85, after entering hospice for kidney failure.

== Works ==
- Why I'm an Only Child and Other Slightly Naughty Plains Folktales. Nebraska Press, 2016.
- The Reluctant Pilgrim: A Skeptic’s Journey into Native Mysteries. Nebraska, 2015.
- My Nebraska: The Good, the Bad, and the Husker. Nebraska, 2011.
- Weed 'em and Reap. Falcon, 2006.
- From Tinkering to Torquing: A Beginner's Guide to Tractors and Tools. MBI Publishing Company, 2005.
- A Life with Dogs. Motorbooks International, 2004.
- Everything I Know About Women, I Learned From My Tractor, MBI Publishing Company, 2002, 2003
- Old Tractors Never Die: Roger's Guide to the Care and Feeding of Ancient Iron. Voyageur Press, 2001.
- Postcards from Nebraska: The Stories Behind the Stories as Seen on CBS News "Sunday Morning". J&L Lee Company, 2000.
- Love, Sex, and Tractors. Motorbooks International, 2000.
- Diggin' in and Piggin' Out: The Truth About Food and Men. New York: HarperCollins, 1997.
- Busted Tractors and Rusty Knuckles: Norwegian Torque Wrench Techniques and Other Fine Points of Tractor Restoration. Motorbooks International, 1997.
- Old Tractors and the Men Who Love Them: How to Keep Your Tractors Happy and Your Family Running. Motorbooks International, 1995.
- Uncle Smoke Stories: Four Fires in the Big Belly Lodge of the Nehawka. New York: Knopf, 1994.
- Touching the Fire: Buffalo Dancers, the Sky Bundle, and Other Tales. New York: Fawcett, 1993.
- Liar's Too: Liar's Corner — The Saga Continues: Another Two and a Half Years of Laughter from the Nebraska Farmer's Liar's Corner. Lincoln: J&L Lee Company, 1993.
- You Know You're a Nebraskan. Lincoln: J&L Lee Company, 1991.
- Sod Walls. Lincoln: J&L Lee Company, 1991.
- It's Not the End of the World But You Can See It From Here. New York: Ballantine, 1990.
- Mister, You Got Yourself a Horse: Tales of Old-Time Horse Trading. Lincoln: University of Nebraska Press, 1987.
- Shingling the Fog and Other Plains Lies. Lincoln: University of Nebraska Press, 1986.
- Catfish at the Pump: Humor and the Frontier. with Linda K. Welsch. Lincoln: U of Nebraska P, 1986.
- Inside Lincoln: (The Things They Never Tell You!). Lincoln: Plains Heritage, 1984.
- A Treasury of Nebraska Pioneer Folklore. Lincoln: University of Nebraska Press, 1984.
- Cather's Kitchens: Foodways in Literature and Life. With Linda K. Welsch. Lincoln: University of Nebraska Press, 1983.
- Omaha Tribal Myths and Tricksters Tales. Swallow Press, 1981.
- Tall-Tale Postcards: A Pictorial History. Oak Tree Publications, 1976.
- A Treasury of Nebraska Pioneer Folklore. Nebraska Press, 1966.

== Articles ==
Welsch has been published in a variety of publications, including Esquire, Natural History, Successful Farming, and elsewhere.

== Recordings ==
- The Prairie: Pistol to Plow. Lincoln, NE: Media Productions, 1986.
- Omaha Indian Music. (liner notes) American Folklife Center, 1985.
- Sweet Nebraska Land. Folkways Records, 1965.

== Awards ==
- "Henry Fonda Award", Nebraska Travel and Tourism Division, 2005.
- "Man of the Year In Service to Nebraska Agriculture", 1996.
- "Mari Sandoz Award" from the Nebraska Library Association.
- "President's Award for creative young faculty", Nebraska Wesleyan University, 1967.
