= Danish people in Omaha, Nebraska =

The Danish people in Omaha, Nebraska, were a predominant ethnic group in the city in the 1920s, and were notable for that compared to other cities across the United States. Omaha, as well as its neighbor, Council Bluffs, had "major colonies of Danes for many years."

== History ==
According to the definitive 1882 History of the State of Nebraska, the first Danes in Nebraska arrived at Florence with the Mormons in the 1840s.

A Danish language newspaper called Den Danske Pioneer was founded in Omaha in 1872. 75 percent of its subscribers were Danish farmers in the United States. In 1882, the Danish Brotherhood in America, a fraternity, was founded in Omaha. In 2010, it counts about 8,000 members.

== Legacy ==
A legacy of the continued influence of Danes in Omaha is the Danish Vennelyst Park, a private facility owned and operated by the Danish American Society of Omaha. The park held Denmark's Constitution Day celebrations annually for many decades. In 2016, the former Danish Brotherhood in America National Headquarters at 3717 Harney Street was listed on the National Register of Historic Places.

As Danes assimilated into American culture throughout the 20th century, many of their institutions faded and closed. The Trinity Norwegian-Danish Lutheran Church was organized in 1895 and was located on T Street near 28th in South Omaha. It was dissolved in 1914. In 2010, the Dana College, founded by the Danes of Omaha in neighboring Blair, Nebraska, closed as well.

The Springwell Danish Cemetery is located in North Omaha. First used in 1868, this cemetery was formally commissioned in 1889 by local Danes. It was designated an Omaha Landmark in 1996.

== See also ==
- Danish American
- History of Omaha, Nebraska
- Culture in Omaha, Nebraska
- Springwell Danish Cemetery
- Danish Brotherhood in America Headquarters
