= Victor W. Voorhees =

- Born: Victor W. Voorhees, Jr. May 4, 1876; Cambria, Wisconsin
- Died: August 10, 1970 (aged 94); Minneapolis, Minnesota
- Occupation: Architect
- Parent(s): Violetta Voorhees; Victor W. Voorhees, Sr.
- Buildings: Washington Hall of Danish Brotherhood Building

Victor W. Voorhees (1876–1970) was an American architect most active in Seattle, Washington. He is credited with the design of over 110 building projects. Considered one of the Northwest's finest designer of garages, he was responsible for a large number of automobile related buildings built on Capitol Hill in the 1910s and 1920s, Seattle's original auto row. His residential plan book, Western Home Builder, which went through six editions between 1907 and 1911, provided templates for popular local house designs like the Seattle box.

== Life ==
Voorhees was born in Cambria, Wisconsin on May 4, 1876. After working as a real estate and loan agent in Minneapolis, he moved to Ballard, Washington in 1904 and founded his first architectural firm, Fisher & Voorhees, and later Voorhees & Palmer, with Lewis W. Palmer, in the Eitel Building in downtown Seattle in 1905, both of which would only last a few months. He practiced architecture in Seattle as principle in his own firm from 1905 to 1941, and was listed as a practicing architect in Seattle's city directory until 1957.

== Projects ==
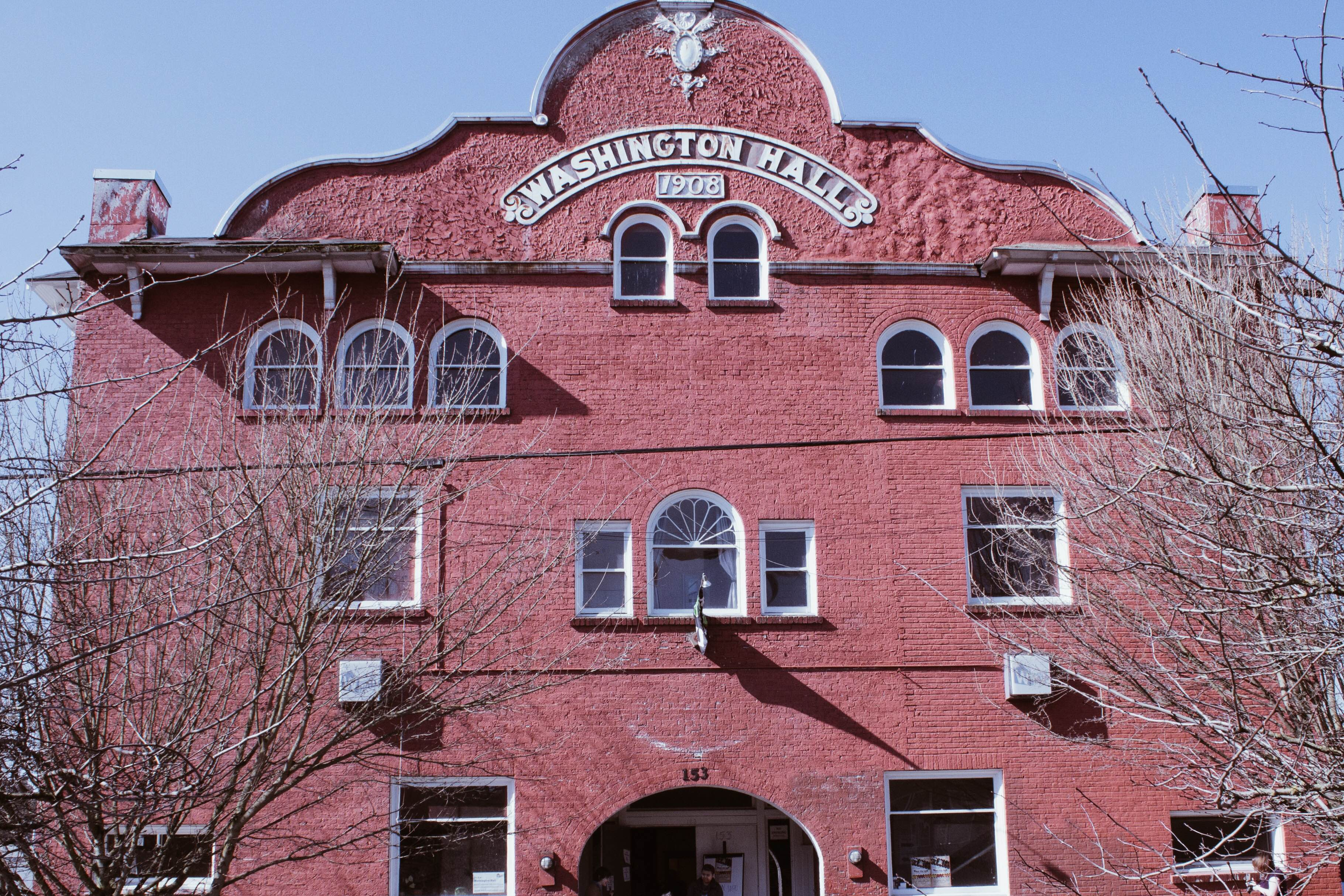
Washington Hall (1908), formerly the Danish Brotherhood Society Hall, in March 2013.

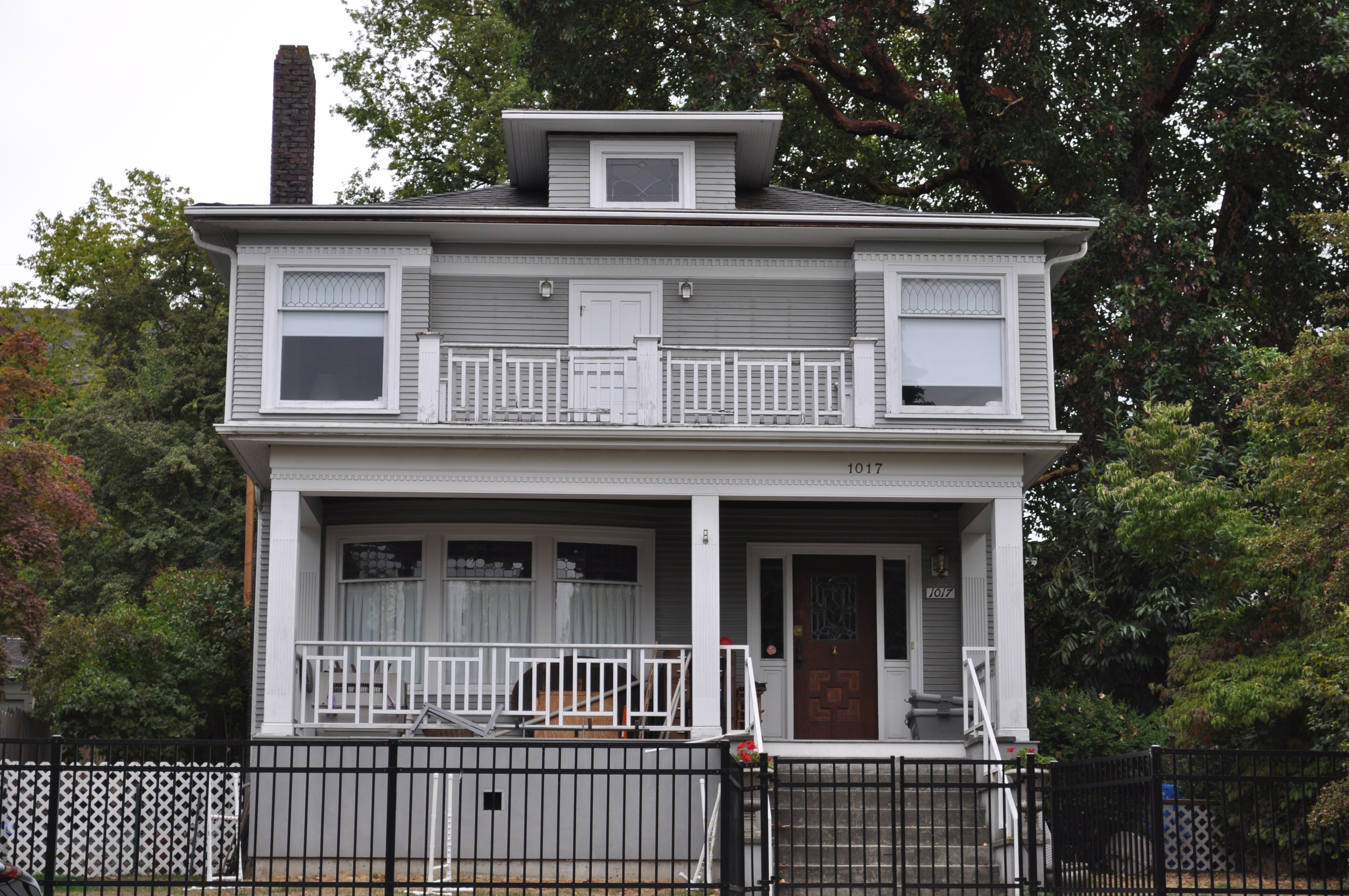
A Seattle box house, based on Voorhees' plan from Western Home Builder

Voorhees designed both commercial and residential buildings, including private homes, apartment buildings, automotive show rooms, banks, movie theaters, and hotels. Several of his designs have been recognized as local and national historic landmarks, including:

- the Washington Hall (Seattle, Washington), a City of Seattle Landmark
- Old Georgetown City Hall, 6202 13th Ave., S., Seattle, Washington, listed on the National Register of Historic Places

While mostly specializing in low-rise commercial and residential buildings beyond Seattle's commercial core, among his last high-profile projects were a trio of skyscrapers for Joseph Vance, including the Lloyd Building (1926), Vance Hotel (1926) and the Joseph Vance Building (1929).
