= Seattle box =

Local variant of the American Foursquare architectural style

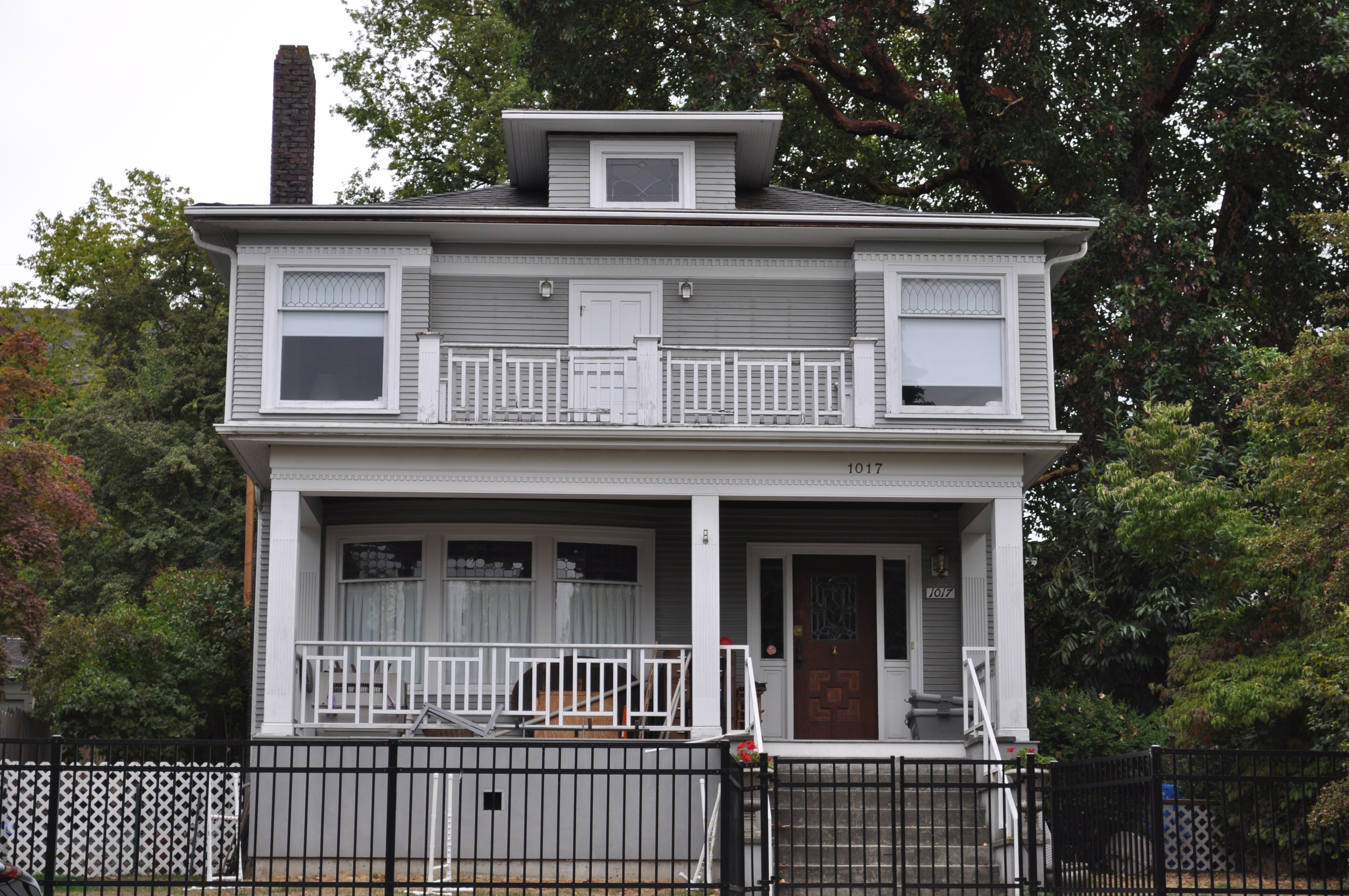
A Seattle box in Capitol Hill, Seattle with a second story balcony above the inset porch

Seattle box is a regional style of residential architecture that was popular in Seattle, Washington and elsewhere in the Pacific Northwest in the early 1900s.

== Exterior features ==
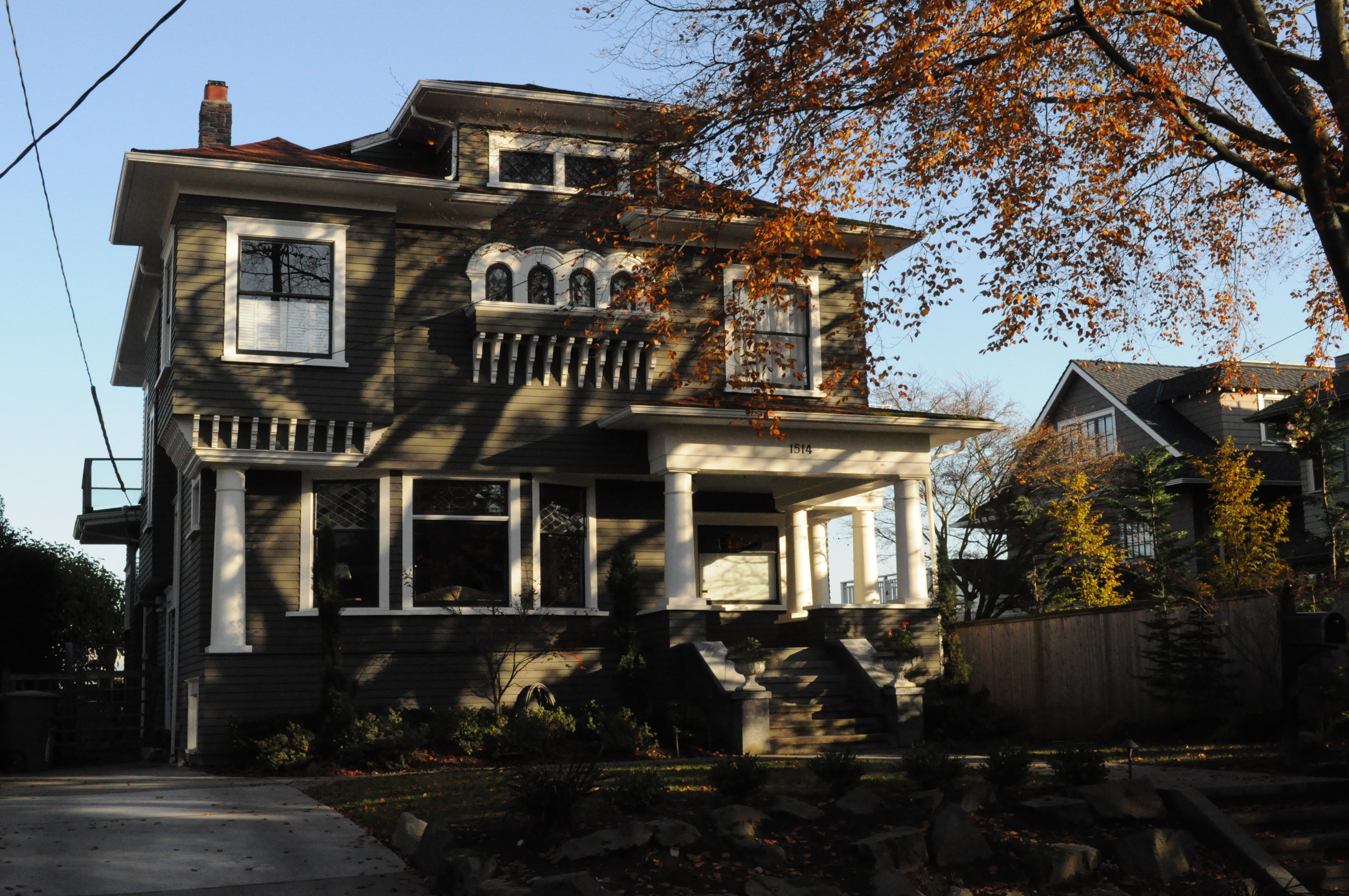
A Seattle box with prominent second floor brackets and ornamental windows in Seattle's Queen Anne neighborhood.

The Seattle box is a local variant of the Classic box or foursquare house. Seattle box houses are two or two-and-one-half story single family homes with four main rooms (generally a kitchen, dining room, living room, and entrance hall) on the first floor and four bedrooms on the second floor. One of the defining features of Seattle box houses are extended bay windows on the second floor corners of the facade, often with prominent ornamental brackets. Other distinctive exterior features include low angle hipped roofs and prominent dormer windows in the center of the facade on the second or third (half) story. The entry is usually located on the left or right side of first floor, rather than the center, under a covered porch that is usually inset and supported by stout, blocky columns.

The design of Seattle box houses reflect many of the architectural styles popular in the early 20th century, especially Arts and Crafts and the Prairie style; however, some incorporate elements of Tudor, Victorian and Mission architectural styles.

== Interior features ==
Like other foursquare house plans, Seattle box houses typically have eight main rooms on two floors: a living room, entry hall, dining room and kitchen downstairs, and four bedrooms upstairs. The upstairs bedrooms at the front of the house feature sitting benches in front of the bay windows.

== History ==
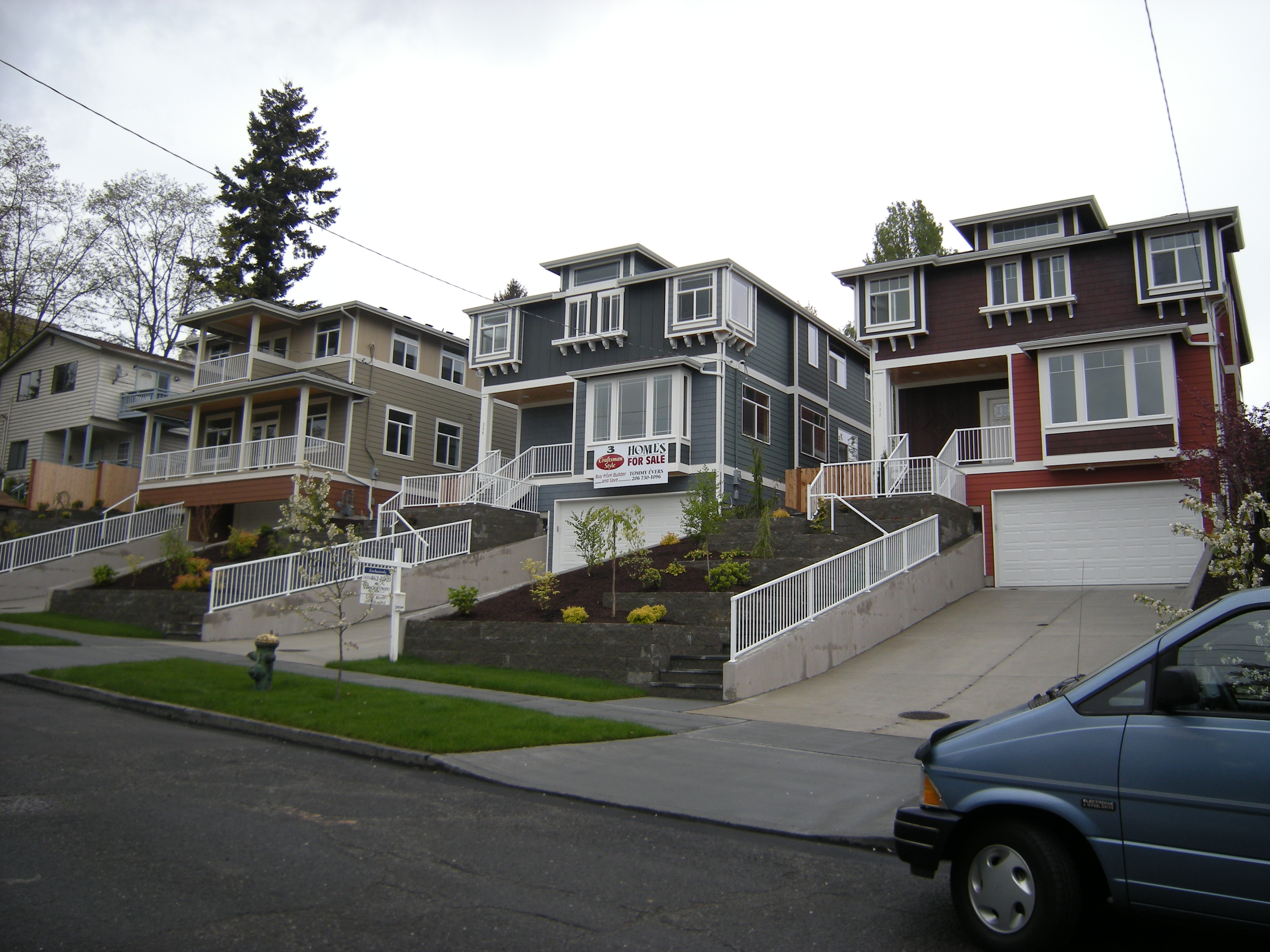
Craftsman revival homes built in 2005 in Seattle's Central District incorporating several architectural elements of the classic Seattle box.

Seattle box houses were built from the early 20th century until the 1940s. The basic plan for the Seattle box was first described in architect Victor W. Voorhees's plan book Western Home Builder (1907) as simply "Design No. 91". This design proved popular with builders, home-buyers and other architects in Seattle's rapidly growing residential neighborhoods and streetcar suburbs, to the extent that some blocks of Seattle's Capitol Hill neighborhood developed around 1910 were built almost entirely according to this plan.

Houses were also built according to the Seattle box plan, by Voorhees and others, in Pacific Northwest cities such as Vancouver, British Columbia, Bellingham, Washington and Portland, Oregon. Many Seattle box houses are listed as historical landmarks in their local municipalities.

In the early 21st century, elements of the classic Seattle box plan were revived in new home developments in Seattle's Central District.

== See also ==
- Architecture of Seattle
- American Foursquare
- American Craftsman
