= Danish Brotherhood in America =

Danish-American fraternal society

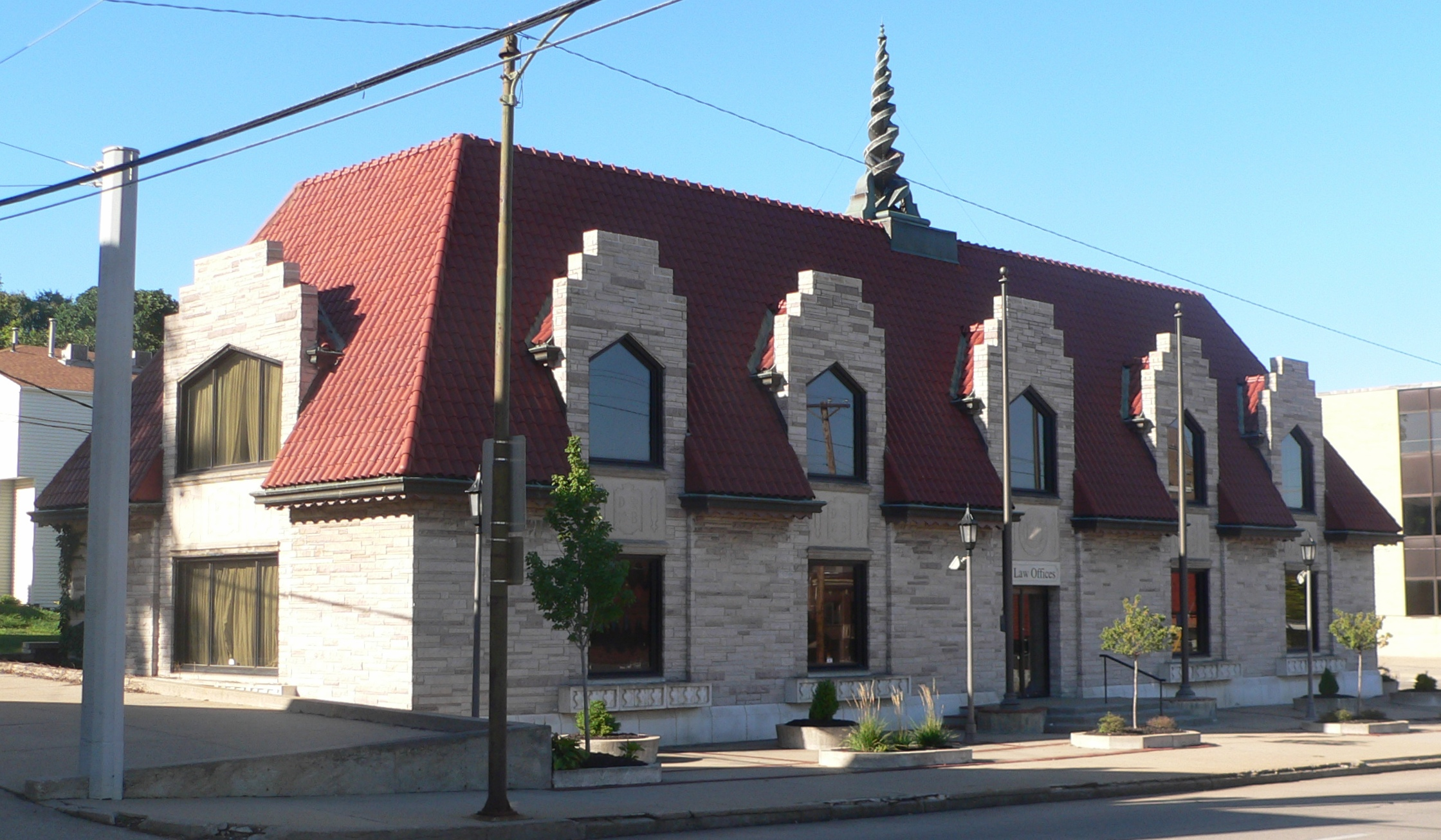
- Headquarters building, Nebraska in 2016
- Established: 1882; 144 years ago
- Founded at: Omaha, Nebraska, United States
- Type: Mutual aid society
- Region served: United States
- Website: danishbrotherhood.org danishbrotherhood.us danishsisterhood.org

Danish Brotherhood in America, also known as the Danish Brotherhood Society, is an American fraternal organization that was founded in 1882 in Omaha, Nebraska, for the Danish community. It had about 8,000 members in 2010. A period report said of the Danish Brotherhood, "This is by far the strongest and most influential secular organization about the Danes in America."

== History ==
In 1881, Mark Hansen formed the Danish Arms Brothers, a group of Danish veterans who had fought in the American Civil War or the Danish-Prussian War, in Omaha, Nebraska. Other societies sprang up in Illinois, Iowa and Wisconsin. In January 1882, five of these societies met in a convention in Omaha and decided to form an ethnic fraternal order that would offer benefits to its members as well as preserving Danish culture and traditions. The order grew steadily; at the end of its first year of existence it had six lodges and 200 members. By 1889, it had 883 members and in 1891, 2,000 in 41 lodges. In 1897, it was reported to have 10,000 members in Massachusetts, Connecticut, New York, Michigan, Illinois, Wisconsin, Minnesota, Iowa, South Dakota, Kansas, Nebraska, California and Washington. In 1923, the Brotherhood had 283 lodges in at least 15 states with 19,176 members. By 1925, the Danish Brotherhood in America had 21,000 members. In 1979, it was back down to 10,000 members in 150 lodges.

The Supreme President of the Brotherhood as of 1923 was Soren Iversen of New Haven, Connecticut.

In 1960, the Brotherhood began a scholarship program.

The organization merged into Woodmen of the World and/or Assured Life Association in August 1995.

Most of the records of the Danish Brotherhood in the United States and Canada are located at the Danish American Archive and Library in Blair, Nebraska, USA. These consist of membership lists by location with information of potential use by genealogists.

== Organization ==
The Brotherhoods local chapters were called "Lodges" and regional groups were called "Districts". The quadrennial national convention was the highest authority. Omaha remained the headquarters of the organization through at least 1979.

The DBA also had a youth auxiliary, the Young Vikings. In addition to fraternal benefits members of this group competed to attend a summer jamboree.

== Insurance and benefits ==
At a convention in Milwaukee in September 1919, the Brotherhood unanimously agreed to a new benefits plan that would put the organization on a 100% solvent basis. Under the new system each policy would be charged with its deficiency which could be paid up all at once or at the death of the policyholder.

== Notable buildings ==
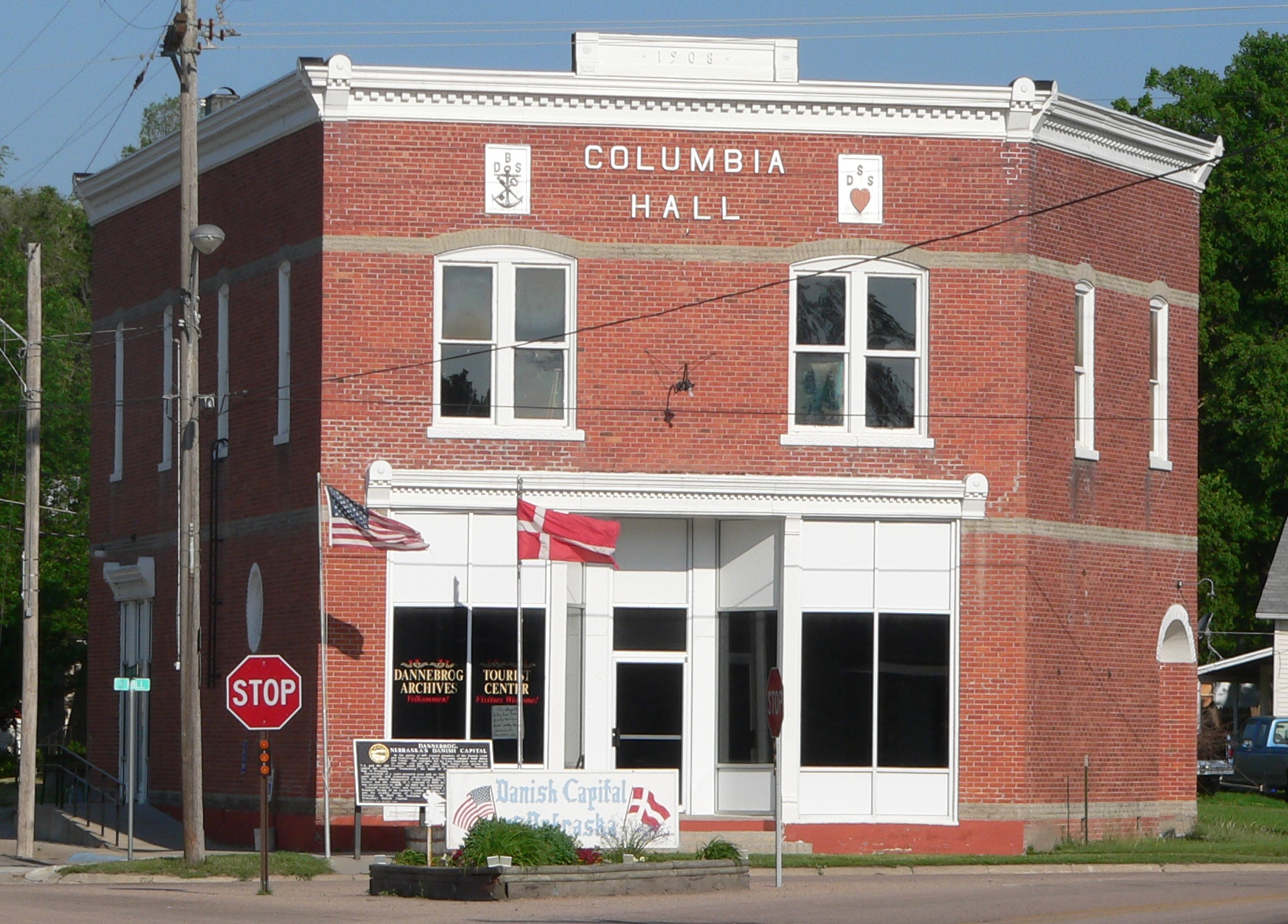
Columbia Hall, in Dannebrog, Nebraska

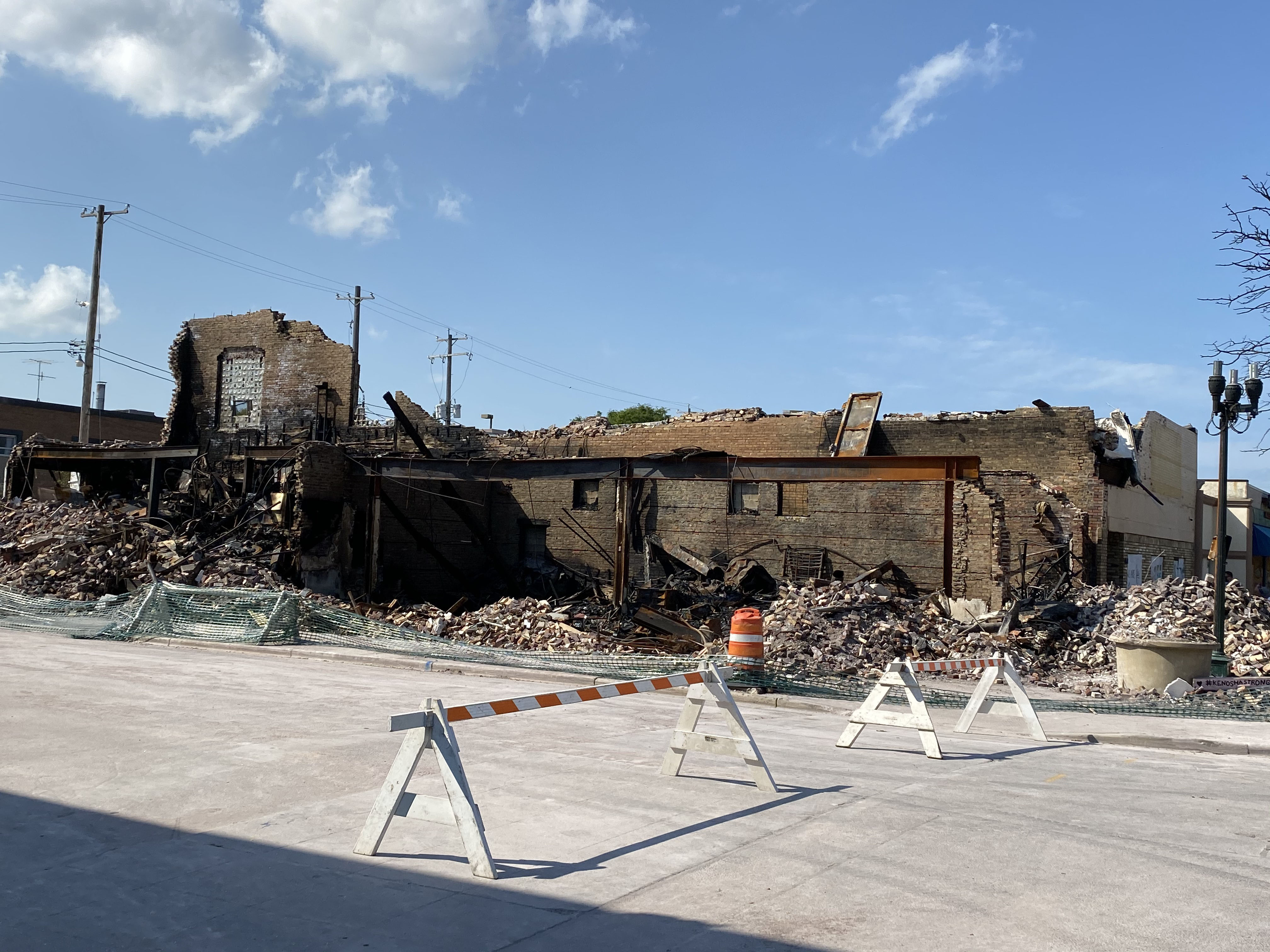
Kenosha building after riots.

Notable buildings of the group include:

- Omaha National Bank Building was the Brotherhoods headquarters as 1924.
- Washington Hall (Seattle, Washington), built in 1908, renovated in 2010
- Columbia Hall, in Dannebrog, Nebraska, also built in 1908
- Danish Brotherhood Hall, Lodge #227, Detroit, Michigan, built 1915 but vacant as of 2021.
- Danish Brotherhood in America National Headquarters Building, 3717 Harney Street in Omaha was listed on the National Register of Historic Places. It was built in 1966.

The brotherhood building in Kenosha, Wisconsin, was burned during the riots in 2020.

== See also ==
- Danes in Omaha, Nebraska
- Danes Hall
- Den Danske Pioneer
