= Pat Graney =

American activist and choreographer

Pat Graney is an American activist and choreographer, based in Seattle, Washington. She founded the Pat Graney Dance Company in 1991, and continues to serve as its artistic director and executive director.

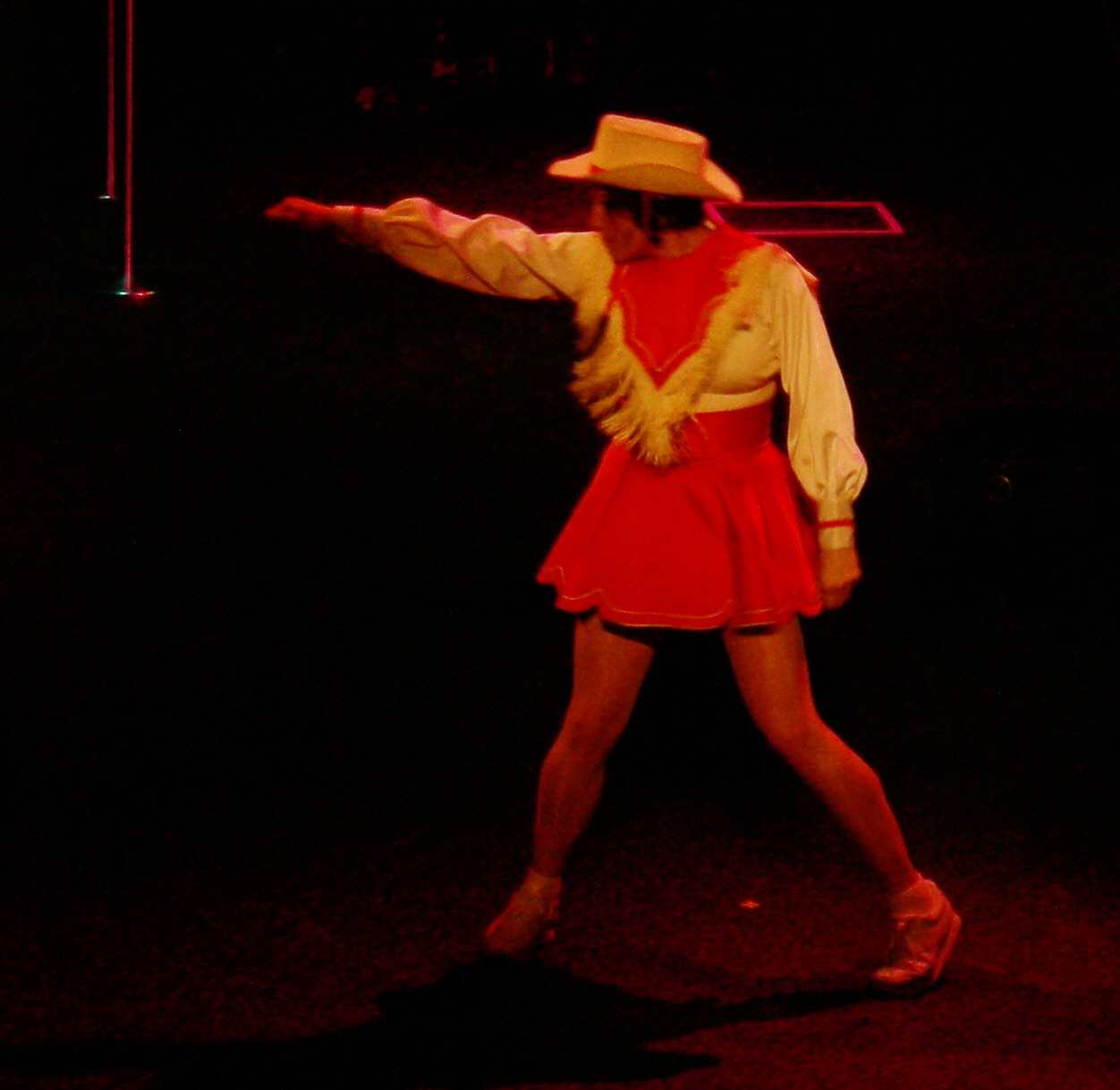
Kara O'Toole dancing in an excerpt from Graney's Jesus Loves the Little Cowgirls as part of a celebration of the 100th anniversary of Seattle's Moore Theatre.

== Childhood and education ==
Born in Chicago, IL, she moved to St. Augustine, FL with her mother and three siblings to be closer to extended family after the passing of her father in an accident. In St. Augustine her mother ran a book shop and antique shop in the ground floor of their house, exposing Graney to a world of literature that would greatly influence her creative work. Graney moved with her mother and siblings as well to Mechanicsville, Virginia and Philadelphia, Pennsylvania due to her mother getting remarried. She left home before completing high school, but was able to graduate through night classes back in St. Augustine, while living alone and supporting both herself and her younger brother. She went on to attend various colleges around the country, including Tallahassee Community College (Tallahassee, Florida) and The Evergreen State College (Olympia, Washington), before finishing at the University of Arizona. In Arizona, she studied extensively with John M. Wilson at the School of Dance, and received a BFA in 1979, at which time she moved to Seattle.

== Activism ==
A feminist activist as well as a choreographer, Graney has worked with teens in the Seattle school system who have been identified as having been trafficked.

=== Keeping the Faith – The Prison Project ===
In 1992, Graney began a non-religious arts-based educational residency program Keeping the Faith – The Prison Project, intended to enrich the lives of incarcerated women and girls. As of 2013, the program works mainly with the Mission Creek Corrections Center for Women in Belfair, Washington, but has made artistic interventions in places as diverse as Japan, Ireland, and Germany. The program introduces writing poetry, collaboratively creating dance pieces, visual arts and sign language. It is one of the nation's longest-running prison arts programs.

== Choreography ==
The Doris Duke Charitable Foundation describes her work as "featur[ing] a diverse set of movement vocabularies that range from ballet to gymnastics to martial arts; explorations of female identity and power; and rich visuals." Seattle's On the Boards writes that "she often explores female identity and power, taking movement inspiration from ballet to gymnastics to martial arts to slapstick."

Graney's 2004 piece The Vivian Girls was based on the drawings and stories of Henry Darger; her Faith Triptych, consisting of Faith (1991), Sleep (1995), and Tattoo (2001), was presented in 2010 at On the Boards.

House of the Mind explored Alzheimer's through Graney's experience with her mother's loss of memory.

Graney created Girl Gods in 2015 to explore the rage of women and girls in the face of social pressure and mistreatment. It draws from work by Judy Chicago and Ana Mendieta.

== Awards ==
Graney has received the Alpert Award in the Arts (2008), a USA Fellowship (2008) a Doris Duke Award (2013). In 1995, she won a Guggenheim Fellowship in Choreography.
