= Dannebrog, Nebraska =

- Village
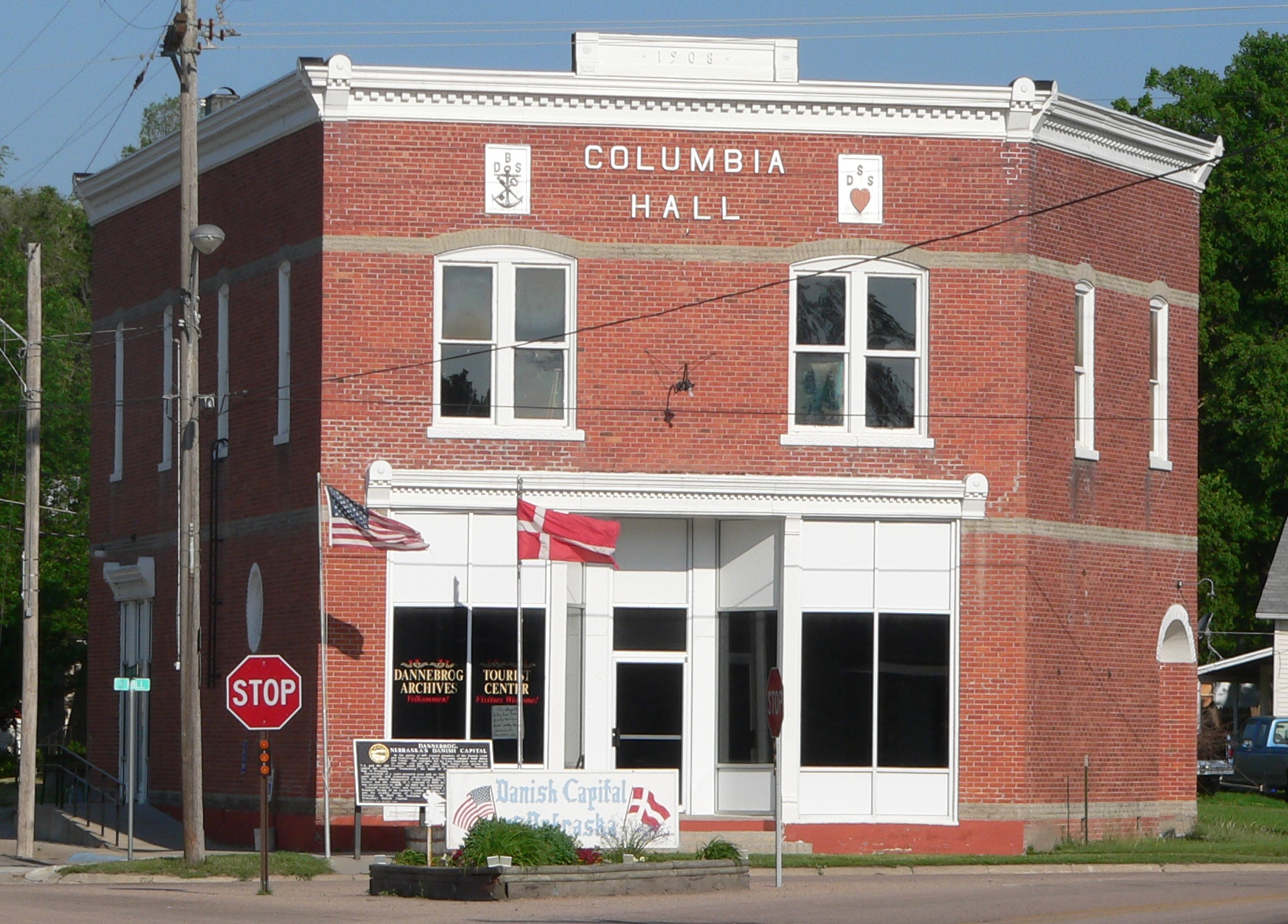
- Columbia Hall was built in 1908 by the Danish Brotherhood in America. It is now the Dannebrog Archives and Tourist Center.

- Flag
- Motto: "The Danish Capital Of Nebraska"
- Location of Dannebrog, Nebraska
- Coordinates: 41°07′07″N 98°32′45″W
- Country: United States
- State: Nebraska
- County: Howard

Area
  - Total: 0.36 sq mi (0.94 km^{2})
  - Land: 0.36 sq mi (0.94 km^{2})
  - Water: 0 sq mi (0.00 km^{2})
- Elevation: 1,860 ft (570 m)

Population (2020)
  - Total: 273
  - Density: 748.2/sq mi (288.89/km^{2})
- Time zone: UTC-6 (Central (CST))
  - Summer (DST): UTC-5 (CDT)
- ZIP code: 68831
- Area code: 308
- FIPS code: 31-12140
- GNIS feature ID: 2398679
- Website: www.dannebrognebraska.org

Dannebrog is a village in Howard County, Nebraska, United States. It is part of the Grand Island, Nebraska Micropolitan Statistical Area. As of the 2020 census, Dannebrog had a population of 273. The town became well known for being routinely featured on the CBS Sunday Morning segments by resident Roger Welsch.

== History ==
The first settlement at Dannebrog was made in 1871 by a colony of Danes from Milwaukee, Wisconsin. The word "Dannebrog" is the Danish name for the flag of Denmark.

The railroad was extended to Dannebrog in 1886.

=== Historic sites ===
Columbia Hall is a historic building of the Danish Brotherhood in America.

== Geography ==
According to the United States Census Bureau, the village has a total area of 0.37 square miles (0.96 km^{2}), all land.

== Demographics ==
Historical population
Census	Pop.	Note	%±
1880	53		—
1890	280		428.3%
1900	301		7.5%
1910	380		26.2%
1920	436		14.7%
1930	427		−2.1%
1940	379		−11.2%
1950	318		−16.1%
1960	277		−12.9%
1970	384		38.6%
1980	356		−7.3%
1990	324		−9.0%
2000	352		8.6%
2010	303		−13.9%
2020	273		−9.9%
U.S. Decennial Census

=== 2010 census ===
As of the census of 2010, there were 303 people, 129 households, and 77 families residing in the village. The population density was 818.9 inhabitants per square mile (316.2/km^{2}). There were 156 housing units at an average density of 421.6 per square mile (162.8/km^{2}). The racial makeup of the village was 91.7% White, 1.7% Native American, 1.7% Asian, 0.7% Pacific Islander, 0.7% from other races, and 3.6% from two or more races. Hispanic or Latino of any race were 5.0% of the population.

There were 129 households, of which 28.7% had children under the age of 18 living with them, 46.5% were married couples living together, 10.1% had a female householder with no husband present, 3.1% had a male householder with no wife present, and 40.3% were non-families. 34.1% of all households were made up of individuals, and 17.1% had someone living alone who was 65 years of age or older. The average household size was 2.35 and the average family size was 3.05.

The median age in the village was 42.5 years. 28.1% of residents were under the age of 18; 3.3% were between the ages of 18 and 24; 21.9% were from 25 to 44; 32.1% were from 45 to 64; and 14.9% were 65 years of age or older. The gender makeup of the village was 52.5% male and 47.5% female.

=== 2000 census ===
As of the census of 2000, there were 352 people, 136 households, and 96 families residing in the village. The population density was 987.2 inhabitants per square mile (381.2/km^{2}). There were 152 housing units at an average density of 426.3 per square mile (164.6/km^{2}). The racial makeup of the village was 97.44% White, 0.57% African American, 0.28% Native American, 0.28% Pacific Islander, 0.28% from other races, and 1.14% from two or more races. Hispanic or Latino of any race were 2.27% of the population.

There were 136 households, out of which 27.9% had children under the age of 18 living with them, 53.7% were married couples living together, 12.5% had a female householder with no husband present, and 29.4% were non-families. 25.0% of all households were made up of individuals, and 12.5% had someone living alone who was 65 years of age or older. The average household size was 2.59 and the average family size was 2.98.

In the village, the population was spread out, with 27.0% under the age of 18, 6.8% from 18 to 24, 24.7% from 25 to 44, 25.0% from 45 to 64, and 16.5% who were 65 years of age or older. The median age was 39 years. For every 100 females, there were 92.3 males. For every 100 females age 18 and over, there were 91.8 males.

As of 2000 the median income for a household in the village was $28,125, and the median income for a family was $31,250. Males had a median income of $21,818 versus $21,875 for females. The per capita income for the village was $12,913. About 9.7% of families and 14.0% of the population were below the poverty line, including 13.9% of those under age 18 and 14.5% of those age 65 or over.

== Notable people ==
- Ken Jacobsen, Washington State Senator
- Roger Welsch, correspondent, CBS News Sunday Morning
