= Sons of Haiti =

Haitian-American fraternal organization

The Sons of Haiti (French: Fils d’Haïti) is (or was; it is unclear whether the organization still exists) a Haitian-American clandestine Masonic Grand Lodge and fraternal organization with headquarters in Renton, Washington.

At its height, the organization had sub-chapters in Arizona, Colorado, Georgia, Illinois, Maryland, New York, New Jersey, Ohio, Oregon, Texas and Washington. The group also had jurisdiction over the King James Grand Lodge of Oregon AF&AM.

== History ==
African American Freemasonry originated in the early nineteenth century, at a time when it was extremely rare for African-Americans to be admitted into mainstream (predominantly white) Masonic Lodges in the United States (a state of affairs that only began to change in the late twentieth century). African-American Freemasonry has been somewhat chaotic, prone to disharmony and schisms. Today, it is common for multiple, rival, African-American Grand Lodges to exist in the same State, each declaring the others illegitimate and irregular. The Prince Hall Masonic Lodges are the only recognized masonic bodies internationally as true Masonic lodges which was created for African American men.The Sons of Haiti are an irregular clandestine body that was formally founded in 1962 after a preceding period when the organization was involved with lawsuits against other African American Masonic organizations in Washington. Following its founding, the organization was recognized by the Grand Lodges of Haiti, The Grande Loge de France, and a Mexican Grand Lodge. Prince Hall Freemasonry's Phylaxis Society describes the Sons of Haiti as "bogus" for not having descended from African Lodge Number 459 or the United Grand Lodges of England, Ireland, or Scotland. Sons of Haiti are not considered a legitimate body of Freemasonry by any regular Masonic body.

The Supreme Council of the Sons of Haiti Lodge is/was located in Renton, Washington. The Renton City Council "recognized August 11, 2010 as Sons of Haiti Supreme Council Day".

Before moving to Renton, the Supreme Council operated out of Washington Hall in Seattle, which they purchased in 1973. They rented the auditorium to various community groups, which used the rented space for concerts and other public gatherings. The building was sold in 2009 to Historic Seattle for $1.5 million.

The organization has held annual Supreme Council planning and session events from 1983 to 2006 in locations ranging from Oakland, California to Nassau in the Bahamas.

== Community involvement and charity ==
The Sons of Haiti acted as a volunteer group at the city of Portland, Oregon's 24th annual "Keep Alive The Dream" tribute to Reverend Martin Luther King Jr. in 2009.

Charitable entities associated with Sons of Haiti include:

- Sons of Haiti Manor Housing Association, 153 14th Ave, Seattle, Washington, founded in 1995, a registered nonprofit
- Sons of Haiti Senior Housing Association, same address and founding date, also a registered nonprofit
