= Assured Life Association =

Fraternal benefit society

Assured Life Association, formerly Woodmen of the World and/or Assured Life Association, having officially changed its name to on January 1, 2015, is a fraternal benefit society based in Denver, Colorado, whose beginnings can be traced to the same founder as Modern Woodmen of America and Woodmen of the World in 1890. Today, Assured Life Association is not affiliated with either organization. Aside from offering insurance benefits the organization is a non-profit Life Insurer organized to give back revenues to its member customers through direct benefits such as college scholarships and summer camp grants for youth and through discounts on other products and services. The Society also has a member-directed matching charitable giving program. Four national community service projects are promoted among Society member customers each year.

== History ==
The Modern Woodmen had been formed in 1883 by Joseph Root, but by 1890 the group was rent by factional disputes. Out of this conflict emerged two new organizations, the Woodmen of the World based in Omaha, Nebraska, and a "neighbor" organization Pacific Jurisdiction of the Woodmen of the World which originally included California, Oregon, Washington, Idaho, Nevada, Utah, Montana and Wyoming. Colorado later joined when the majority of the members of the MWA there voted to join the new group. The group was incorporated under Colorado law on January 20, 1891, and its first headquarters was at the McPhee Building in Denver.

The Jurisdiction remained as an affiliate to the Omaha-based Woodmen until 1916. It set its own rates and collected its own assessments. The only connections with the Omaha group were the names and rituals, for the privilege of using which the Jurisdiction paid a 5 cent per member assessment to the Omaha Woodmen after Jan. 1, 1893. At the 12th Regular Meeting of the Head Camp Session in July 1916, the Denver-based group decided to amend its articles of incorporation to drop the "Pacific Jurisdiction" part of its name and adopted resolutions severing ties to the Omaha group and adopted its own rituals.

On January 1, 2015, the Society changed its name to Assured Life Association, dropping all use of the name Woodmen of the World.

=== Mergers and expansion ===
In the 1960s, the Woodmen entered into agreements with or absorbed a number of smaller insurance agencies. This process began in 1960 when they launched a partnership with the Fireman's Fund Insurance Company to offer discounted sickness, hospitalization and accident premiums to its members than if they had purchased the insurance directly. On December 1, 1962, the Woodmen absorbed the Christian Mutual Benevolent Association. This necessitated a change of name from the Denver group, as they were not licensed to sell insurance where the merged group was active and was prohibited from entering the state under its original name, prompting the first usage of the name Assured Life Association for those areas. This began a trend of expansion for the group, as they had previously been limited to the above-mentioned nine Pacific Western states. In 1965, the organization was granted a license to operate in Oklahoma and by 1990 it was active in 24 states—California, Oregon, Washington, Idaho, Nevada, Utah, Colorado, Wyoming and Montana—under its original name and Hawaii, Arizona, New Mexico, Texas, Oklahoma, Kansas, Nebraska, the Dakotas, Iowa, Missouri, Arkansas, Louisiana, Mississippi and Florida as the Assured Life Association. As of 2024, Assured Life Association is licensed to do business in 37 states.

Other groups that have merged into Assured Life Association have included the Pike's Peak Mutual Benefit Association, which joined on December 30, 1965, Supreme Camp of American Woodmen in April 1994 and the Danish Brotherhood in America in August 1995.

=== Supreme Camp of American Woodmen ===
The Supreme Camp of American Woodmen was founded as another version of the Woodmen order in 1901. By 1910, its leadership was "taken over by black men" and became the de facto African American version of the Woodmen of the World. The Supreme Camp kept much the same rituals and terminology of the other Woodmen groups. Local units were called "Camps," with "Subordinate Camps" and the Supreme Camp at the national level. By the 1950s, the organization had 50,000 "Neighbors", as members of the group were called. In 1970 the Supreme Camp entered into an agreement with the Denver-based Woodmen of the World, with the latter agreeing to provide "benefit and certificate administration services." This arrangement continued for a while until a change in the Denver Woodmen's computer service made it too expensive for the Supreme Camp to use its services. The Supreme Camp was in difficult financial straits, being asked to vacate its headquarters office space in Denver. Working with the Colorado Insurance Commissioner, it merged with the Woodmen on April 21, 1994.

== Organization ==
Local lodges of the Woodmen were called "Camps" and the national structure is called the "Head Camp". There were 72 Camps in 1979. There is also a junior division.

== Membership ==
Women were admitted to membership in 1928. New members are admitted on a ball ballot. In 1979 there were 31,000 members. The Denver Woodmen reported 20,000 members in 1990 and 22,000 in 1994.

== Ritual ==
Like most fraternal benefit societies, the Woodmen had a ritual, though the usual altar in the middle of the lodge room is replaced by a tree stump. The ritual attempts to teach the four cardinal virtues of the order: hospitality, service, loyalty and protection.

== Benefits and philanthropy ==
The Woodmen sponsor a number of recreational and social activities, including dinners, dances, bingo parties, picnics and athletic events, as well as assisting its members when they need material and financial help. They have also awarded scholarships, supported Korean and Vietnamese refugees and donated equipment to hospitals.
