= Washington Hall (Seattle) =

Historic building in Seattle, Washington, U.S.

- U.S. National Register of Historic Places
- Seattle Landmark
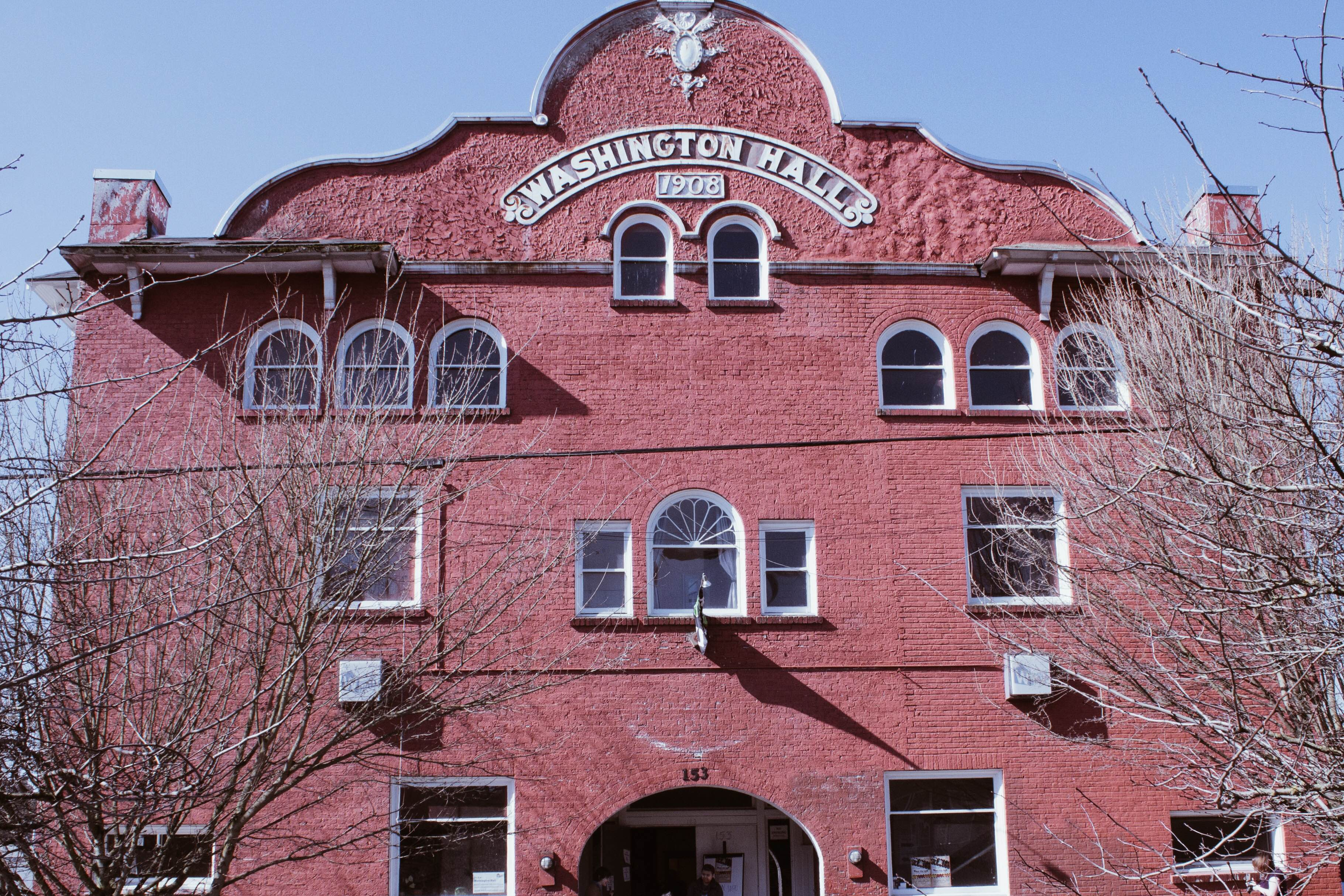
- Front of the building (east façade) in 2013

- Location within Downtown Seattle
- Location: 153 14th Avenue, at E. Fir Street, Seattle, Washington
- Coordinates: 47°36′10.22″N 122°18′52.7″W
- Built: 1908
- Architect: Victor W. Voorhees
- Architectural style: Mission Revival and Spanish Colonial Revival
- NRHP reference No.: 10001018

Significant dates
- Added to NRHP: December 13, 2010
- Designated SEATL: July 16, 2010

Washington Hall is a historic building and a registered city landmark in Seattle, Washington, that is listed on the National Register of Historic Places. It was originally built as a community center by the Danish Brotherhood in America, a fraternal organization, with meeting halls and one-room apartments for new immigrants. In 1973, the building was sold to the Sons of Haiti (an African-American Masonic group) who leased the space to various tenants. It was purchased in 2009 by Historic Seattle and was renovated and re-opened in 2010 as an events and performance space.

== Description ==
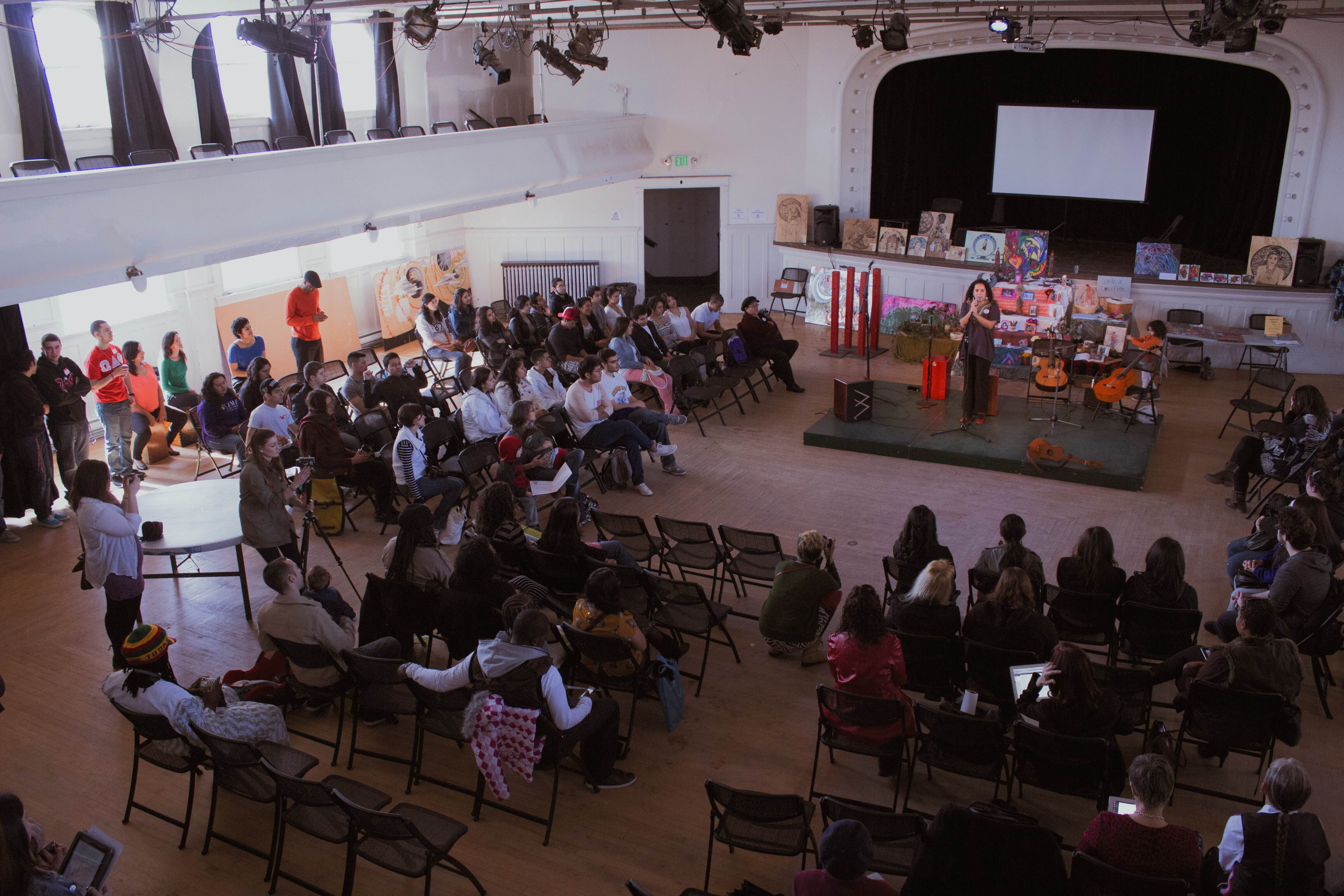
Interior of Washington Hall during the March 2013 Women Who Rock un-conference

The building is a three-story, double wood-frame structure with a brick veneer skin. The design is an eclectic mix of Mission Revival and commercial styles.

== History ==
Designed to house the needs of its growing fraternal lodge, the hall was commissioned to be built in 1907 by the Danish Brotherhood in America. The original floor plan was designed by local Seattle architect Victor W. Voorhees, with the intent to provide boarding facilities for new Danish immigrants to Seattle, along with meeting and social spaces for members, and a dance hall and performing arts venue to provide outside income. Throughout its history, it has sheltered immigrants from Denmark, Mexico, Puerto Rico and Brazil. Marcus Garvey and W.E.B. Du Bois have spoken at Washington Hall, and artists like Duke Ellington, Jimi Hendrix and Billie Holiday performed on the upstairs stage. It served as the original home of On the Boards, a presenter of contemporary performance, now located in Lower Queen Anne, a nearby neighborhood."

Washington Hall's original purpose was as a meeting hall for the Danish Brotherhood in America, Seattle Lodge #29, and in the 1970s was purchased by the Sons of Haiti (an African-American Masonic group) who "continued to use the first floor rooms for their organization and rent out the second floor as performance space."

== Renovations ==
The Sons of Haiti completed various renovations; however, by 2007, the building was in poor condition and prospects for preserving the building seemed dim. It was purchased in 2009 by Historic Seattle. The first phase of the building's restoration was completed in 2010, with an additional three phases scheduled over several years. Major architectural and contractor contributors to the project included Ron Wright and Associates/Architects PS, Coughlin Porter Lundgren, and Lydig Construction. After all four phases were complete, the building reopened to the public in May 2016.

The building was subsequently designated a Seattle city landmark, and in 2010 a $90,000 grant was secured for its renovation. In December 2010, it was added to the National Register of Historic Places.

== See also ==
- List of Danish Brotherhood in America buildings
- List of Masonic buildings
