= List of Art Deco architecture in Washington (state) =

This is a list of buildings that are examples of the Art Deco architectural style in Washington, United States.

== Bremerton ==
- Admiral Theater, Bremerton, 1942
- Pacific Planetarium (former Fire Station No. 1), Bremerton, 1939
- Roxy Theater, Bremerton, 1941
- Valentinetti Puppet Museum (former Seattle-First National Bank)

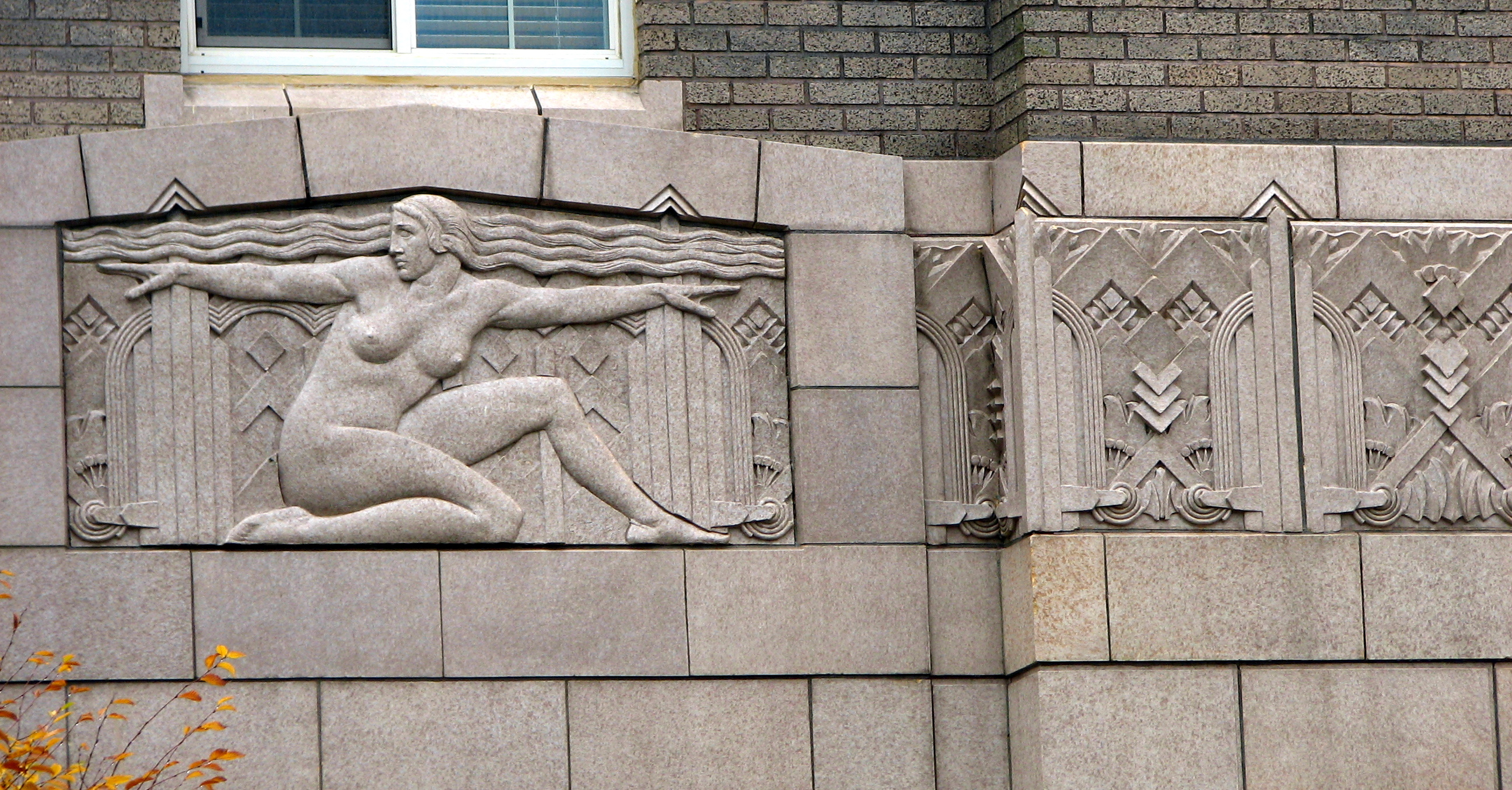
Pacific Telephone and Telegraph Building, Longview,

== Longview ==
- Big Four Furniture Building (former Lumberman's Bank), Longview, 1934
- Pacific Telephone and Telegraph Building, Longview, 1928
- Stageworks Theatre, Longview, 1941

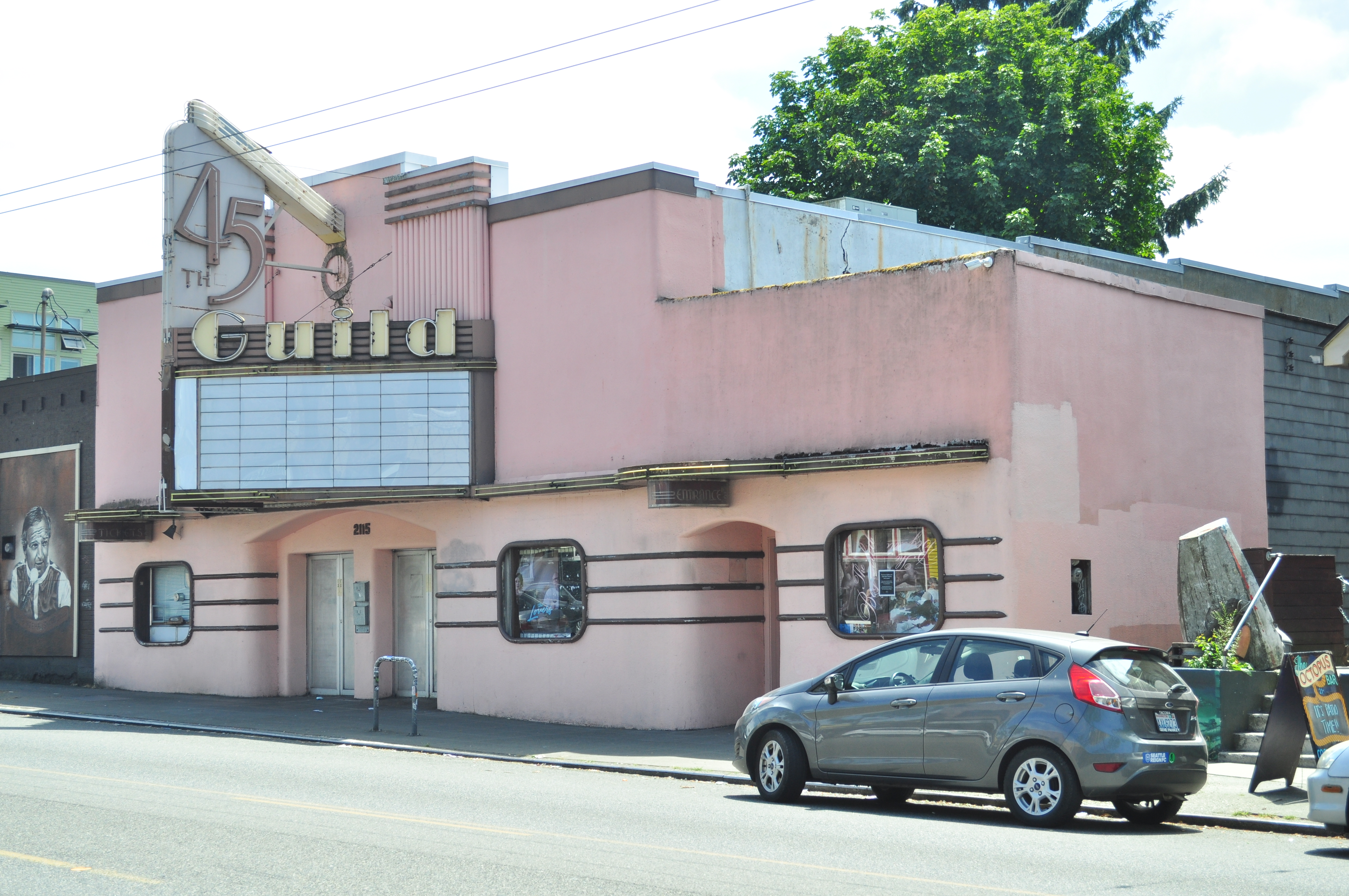
Guild 45th Theater, Seattle, demolished 2024

== Seattle ==
- 1411 4th Avenue Building, Seattle, 1928
- Admiral Theater, Seattle, 1919, 1942
- Exchange Building, Seattle, 1929
- Federal Office Building, Seattle, 1932
- Fire Station No. 6, Seattle (now replaced by newer station)
- Fire Station No. 41, Magnolia Neighborhood, Seattle, 1936
- Hartford Building (now a coffee shop), Seattle
- Jewel Box Theatre, Seattle, 1932
- Macy's (former Bon Marché), Seattle, 1929
- Naval Reserve Armory, Seattle, 1942
- Pacific Tower, Seattle, 1932
- Sanctuary at Admiral, Seattle, 1929
- Schmitz Park Bridge, Seattle, 1936
- Seattle Asian Art Museum, Seattle, 1933
- Seattle Tower (former Northern Life Tower), Seattle, 1927
- SIFF Cinema Uptown (former Uptown Theatre), Seattle, 1926 and 1940s
- United Shopping Tower, Seattle, 1929
- Varsity Theatre, Seattle, 1921
- Washington Athletic Club, Seattle, 1930

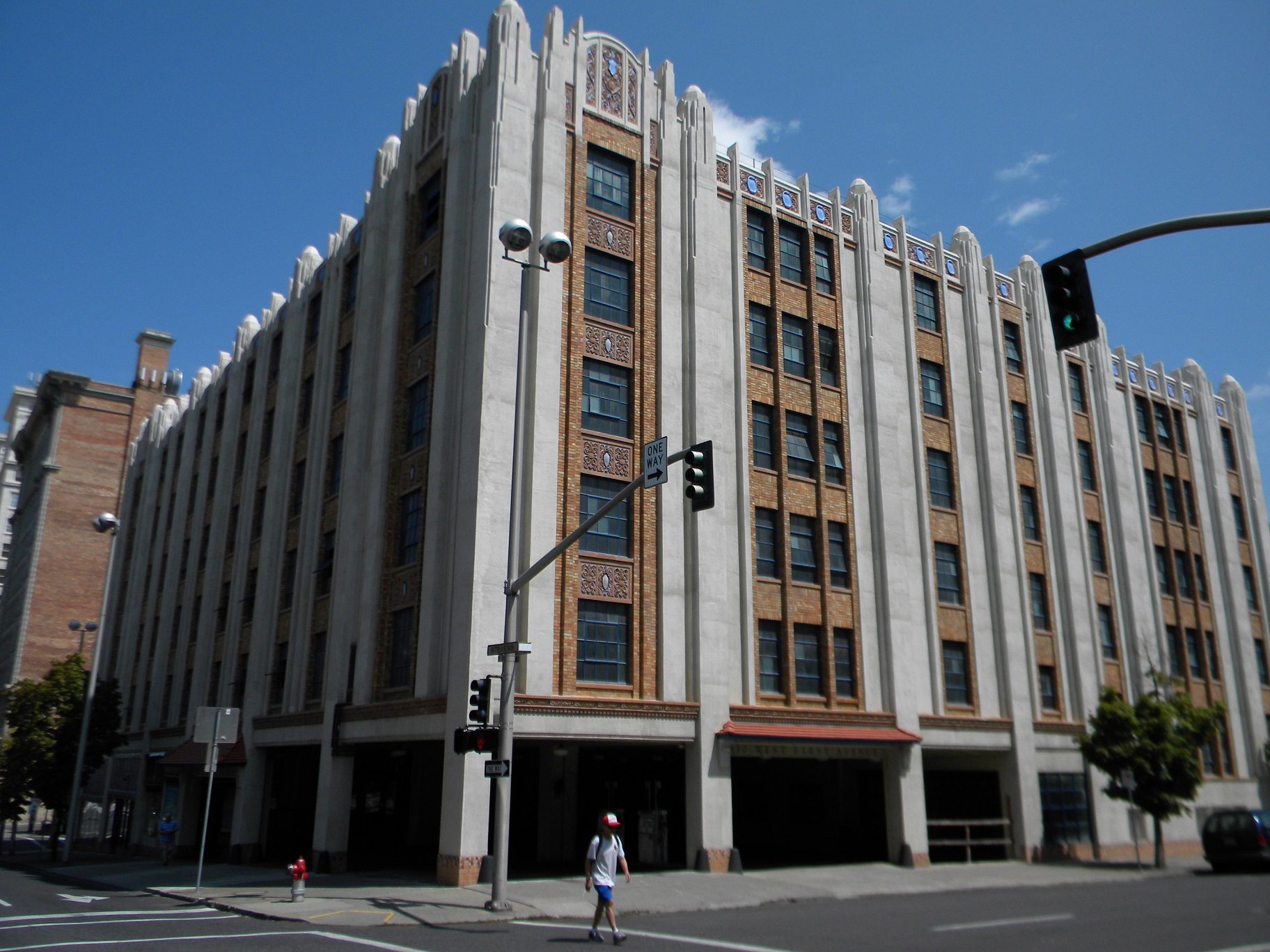
City Ramp Garage, Spokane

== Spokane ==
- City Ramp Garage, Spokane, 1928
- Felts Field, Spokane, 1932
- Fox Theater, Spokane, 1931
- Garland Theater, Spokane, 1945
- John R. Rogers High School, Spokane, 1932
- Pay'n Takit, Spokane, 1933
- Sears, Roebuck Department Store, Spokane, 1929

== Tacoma ==
- Fire Station No. 2, Tacoma, 1907
- Fire Station No. 5, Tacoma, 1935
- Tacoma Soccer Center (former Tacoma Exposition Hall), 1940
- Tacoma Municipal Building, Tacoma, 1933
- USA of Yesterday (former Brus Buick Dealership), 1948

== Vancouver ==
- Clark County Courthouse, Vancouver, 194
- Kiggins Theatre, Vancouver, 1936
- Luepke Florist, Vancouver, 1937, 1945
- Vancouver Telephone Building, Vancouver, 1934

== Other cities ==
- A. E. Larson Building, Yakima, 1931
- Adams County Courthouse, Ritzville
- Bellingham City Hall, Bellingham, 1939
- Cascadian Hotel, Downtown Wentachee Historic District, Wentachee, 1929
- Chehalis Theatre, Chehalis, 1938
- Collins Building, Colville, 1937
- Covington Electrical Substation, Bonneville Power Administration, Covington, 1941
- D&R Theatre, Aberdeen, 1924 and 1937
- Everett City Hall, Everett, 1920s
- F. W. Woolworth Company Store, Renton, 1954
- Ferry County Courthouse, Republic, 1936
- First American National Bank Building, Port Townsend
- Fox Theatre, Centralia, 1930
- Kelso Theater, Kelso, 1923
- Klickitat County Courthouse, Goldendale, 1942
- Larson Building, Yakima
- Loudon Brothers Dairy Building, Ellensburg, 1930s
- National Bank of Ellensburg (now 420 Loft), Ellensburg, 1937
- North Bend Theatre, North Bend, 1941
- Olympic Theatre, Arlington, 1939
- Omak Cinema, Omak, 1937
- Pacific Telephone Building, Walla Walla, 1936
- Princess Theater, Prosser, 1919 and 1940s
- Renton Theatre, Renton, 1920s
- Ritz Theatre, Ritzville (AKA New Ritz Theatre), 1937
- Sacajawea Interpretive Center, Sacajawea State Park, Franklin, 1938
- Thurston County Courthouse, Olympia, 1930
- United States Post Office and Annex, Wenatchee, (now the Wenatchee Valley Museum & Cultural Center) 1918 and 1938
- United States Post Office Hoquiam Main, Hoquiam, 1932
- United States Post Office Lynden Main, Lynden, 1940

== See also ==
- List of Art Deco architecture
- List of Art Deco architecture in the United States
