= List of Art Deco architecture in Washington =

List of Art Deco architecture in Washington may refer to:

- List of Art Deco architecture in Washington (state)
- List of Art Deco architecture in Washington, D.C.
