= List of mayors of Everett, Washington =

The city of Everett, Washington, United States, has a form of government that is led by an elected mayor and a city council. As of 2018, the city has had 37 mayors.

== List of mayors ==
- Thomas Dwyer, 1893–1894
- Norton D. Walling, 1894–1895
- Jacob Hunsaker, 1895–1896, 1903–1904
- William C. Cox, 1896–1897
- Jacob A. Falconer, 1897–1899
- James O. Whitmarsh, 1899–1900
- James E. Bell, 1900–1901
- Charles K. Greene, 1901–1902
- William E. Terrill, 1902–1903
- Thomas E. Headlee, 1904–1906
- James H. Mitchell, 1906–1907
- Newton Jones, 1907–1910
- Roland H. Hartley, 1910–1912
- Richard B. Hassell, 1912–1912
- Christian Christenson, 1912–1914
- Thomas J. Kelly, 1914–1914
- William H. Clay, 1914–1916, 1920–1924
- Dennis D. Merrill, 1916–1920
- John Henry Smith, 1924–1928
- Nelson D. Martin, 1925–1932
- Arthur C. Edwards, 1932–1942
- Stephen Frank Spencer, 1940–1942
- John Davis Williams, 1942–1943
- Henry Arends, 1944–1952
- Louis H. Unzelman, 1952–1954
- C. Arvid Johnson, 1954–1956
- George N. Culmback, 1956–1960
- George W. Gebert, 1960–1964
- Arthur F. "Bud" Alexander, 1964–1968
- Robert C. Anderson, 1968–1977
- Joyce M. Ebert, 1977–1977
- William E. Moore, 1977–1990
- Pete Kinch, 1990–1994
- Edward D. Hansen, 1994–2002
- Frank E. Anderson, 2002–2003
- Ray Stephanson, 2004–2017
- Cassie Franklin, 2018–present

== See also ==
- Everett City Hall building
- History of Everett, Washington
- City government in Washington (state)
