= Abraham H. Albertson =

American 20th century architect

- Born: April 14, 1872; Hope, New Jersey, U.S.
- Died: April 18, 1964 (aged 92); Seattle, Washington, U.S.
- Occupation: Architect

Abraham Horace Albertson (April 14, 1872 – April 18, 1964) was an American architect who was one of Seattle, Washington's most prominent architects of the first half of the 20th century. He was born in New Jersey and educated at Columbia University in New York. Early in his career, he moved to Seattle in the employ of a well-known New York architectural firm with that was developing a large area in downtown. He worked on many projects in Seattle from around 1910 through the 20s and early 30s. Some of his designs are Seattle landmarks and/or listed on the National Register of Historic Places.

== Early life ==
Albertson was born April 14, 1872, in Hope Township, New Jersey, to New Jersey natives Edward H. Albertson, a grocer, and Victoria [nee Newman] Albertson. In 1880, he was living in Hackettstown and subsequently lived in New York City for more than a decade, including time attending Columbia University, where he graduated, with scholarship assistance, from the Columbia School of Architecture with a Ph.B in 1895.

He served in Cuba during the Spanish–American War as a corporal in the U.S. Army and New York State National Guard. He served with Col. Theodore Roosevelt at the Battle of San Juan Hill and the Siege of Santiago. After the war, he returned to New York.

== Career ==
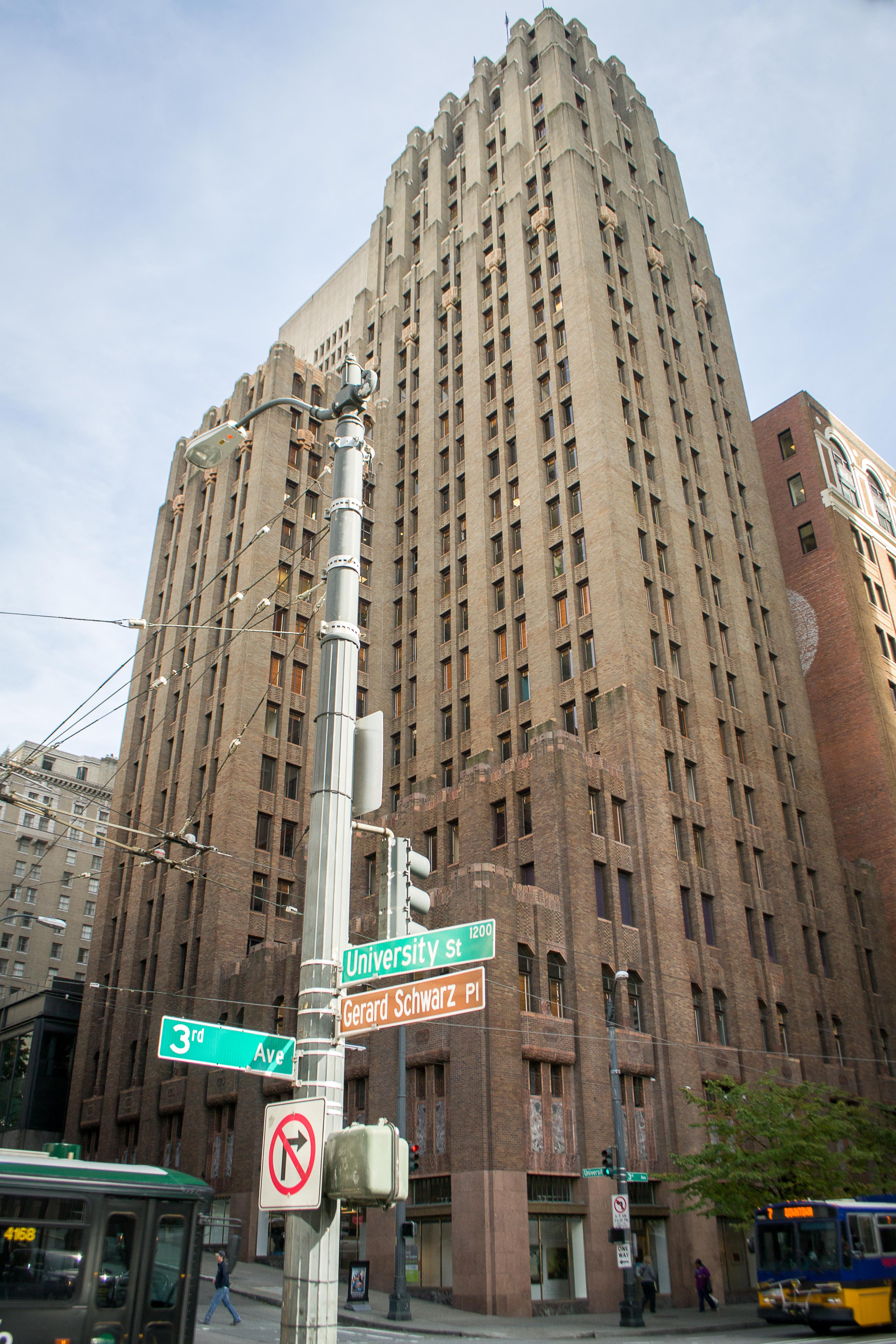
Northern Life Tower

Albertson worked in New York City for the architectural firm Clinton and Russell. He was one of its earliest employees after it opened in 1894 when he started as a draftsman.

Albertson moved to Duluth, Minnesota, in 1905, and then to Seattle in 1907 as the local representative of the New York City architectural firm Howells and Stokes. He was joined in the Seattle office by Joseph W. Wilson and Paul D. Richardson, who became his future partners.

Albertson remained in Seattle after Howells and Stokes dissolved in 1917, and was the principal in several firms—Howells and Albertson (1920–28) (which succeeded the local office of Howells and Stokes after that firm closed); Albertson and Associates (1920–1933); and Albertson, Wilson, and Richardson (1935–1937) which reflected his associates becoming full partners. The latter firm, however, had little work due to the Great Depression. His final position was with the federal government, as chief architect of the Washington State office of the Federal Housing Authority from 1939 until his retirement in 1949.

== Projects ==
Alberston was the local representative of Howells and Stokes planning the redevelopment of the original downtown Seattle site of the University of Washington. The Metropolitan Tract was, at the time, the largest development of a downtown site undertaken in the United States. He also supervised other work of Howells and Stokes in the west, including San Francisco's Royal Insurance Building. After the demise of Howells and Stokes, Albertson (with Wilson and Richardson) continued on to complete most of the remaining buildings in the Metropolitan Tract.

Albertson designed a significant modification to the waterfront for a new Seattle Railroad and Marine Terminal, but the project was abandoned due to the more pressing needs of World War I. The war brought him other government work including the Navy Yard Hotel in Bremerton, and various apartments, houses, and schools.

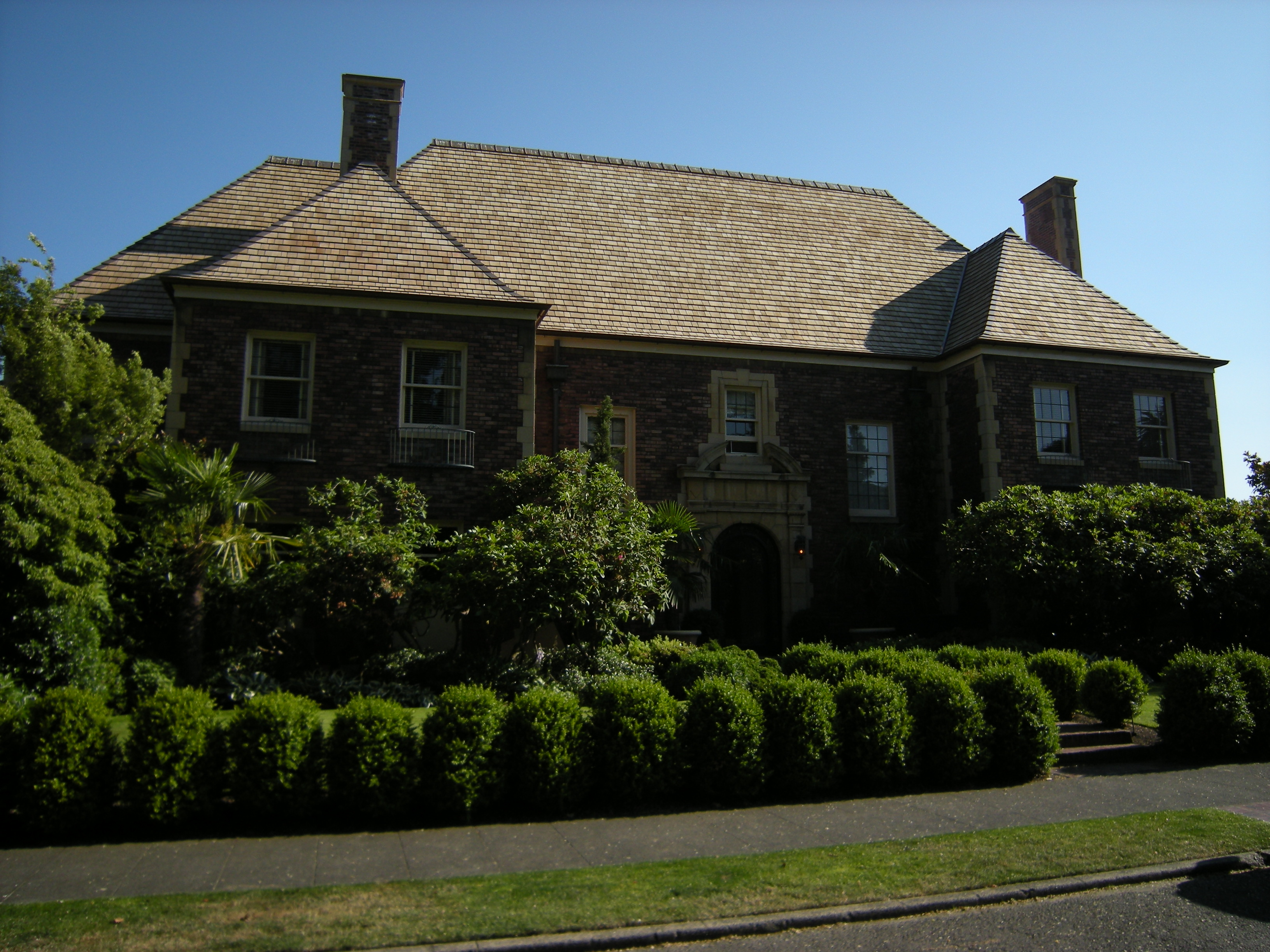
The Stuart/Balcom House, called the Mrs. Grant Smith residence when Albertson designed it

Albertson supervised the construction of the White-Henry-Stuart Building (1923), Cobb Building (1910), Stimson Building (1925) and the Metropolitan Theatre. Some of his best known designs include the Northern Life Tower built in (1927–29), the downtown YMCA (1929–31), St. Joseph’s Church and Cornish School (1920-21), the Mrs. Grant Smith residence at 619 W. Comstock Street (a designated Seattle landmark, now the Stuart/Balcom House), St. Anne’s Convent (1930), and an addition to the former Children’s Orthopedic Hospital.

The architectural styles produced by Albertson varied greatly, including Spanish Revival, Art Deco, and Collegiate Gothic.

== Affiliations and legacy ==
Albertson became a member of the American Institute of Architects in 1910 and was once the national director. He was a chairman Seattle's building code committee, wrote the Seattle Tenement House Law, and was a director of the Seattle Social Welfare League, chairman of the Bi-state Federal Historical Monuments Survey, vice-chairman of the Washington State Emergency Public Works Board among other public positions.

Seattle's Symphony station, built in 1990, contains a staircase with quotations inscribed on the risers from Albertson describing the Cobb Building, served by the station and located just across University Street. In addition to sentence-long quotations, the public art installation includes a silhouette of Albertson.

== Personal ==
In 1915, Albertson married Claire D. Fox, who was born in Illinois c. 1872, in Kitsap County, Washington. After her death in 1946, Albertson married Elizabeth G. Henry in Seattle. Albertson died April 18, 1964, in Seattle after a short illness.

== Projects ==
=== National Register ===
The following buildings he designed are listed on the National Register of Historic Places:

- Everett City Hall, Everett, Washington
- Stuart/Balcom House, Seattle
- Vancouver Telephone Building, Vancouver, Washington
- Women's University Club of Seattle, Seattle
- Medical Dental Building, Seattle
- Northern Life Tower, Seattle
- St. Joseph’s Church and Cornish School, Seattle
- Monte Cristo Hotel, Everett, Washington (consulting architect)
- Cobb Building, Seattle (supervised construction)
- Hotel Morck, Aberdeen, Washington

=== San Francisco ===
The following building is a San Francisco Designated Landmark:

- Royal Insurance Building, San Francisco (supervised construction)
