= J. H. Smith (mayor) =

American politician

J. H. Smith (1858–1956) was a politician and pioneer.

== Biography ==
Smith was born John Henry Smith on September 12, 1858, in Dousman, Wisconsin. He died on February 15, 1956, in Everett, Washington.

== Career ==
Smith served as mayor of Everett from 1924 to 1928. Later, he would co-found the city of Anchorage, Alaska.

== See also ==
- List of mayors of Everett, Washington
