= Medical Dental Building (Seattle) =

Building in Seattle, Washington, U.S.

- U.S. National Register of Historic Places
- Seattle Landmark
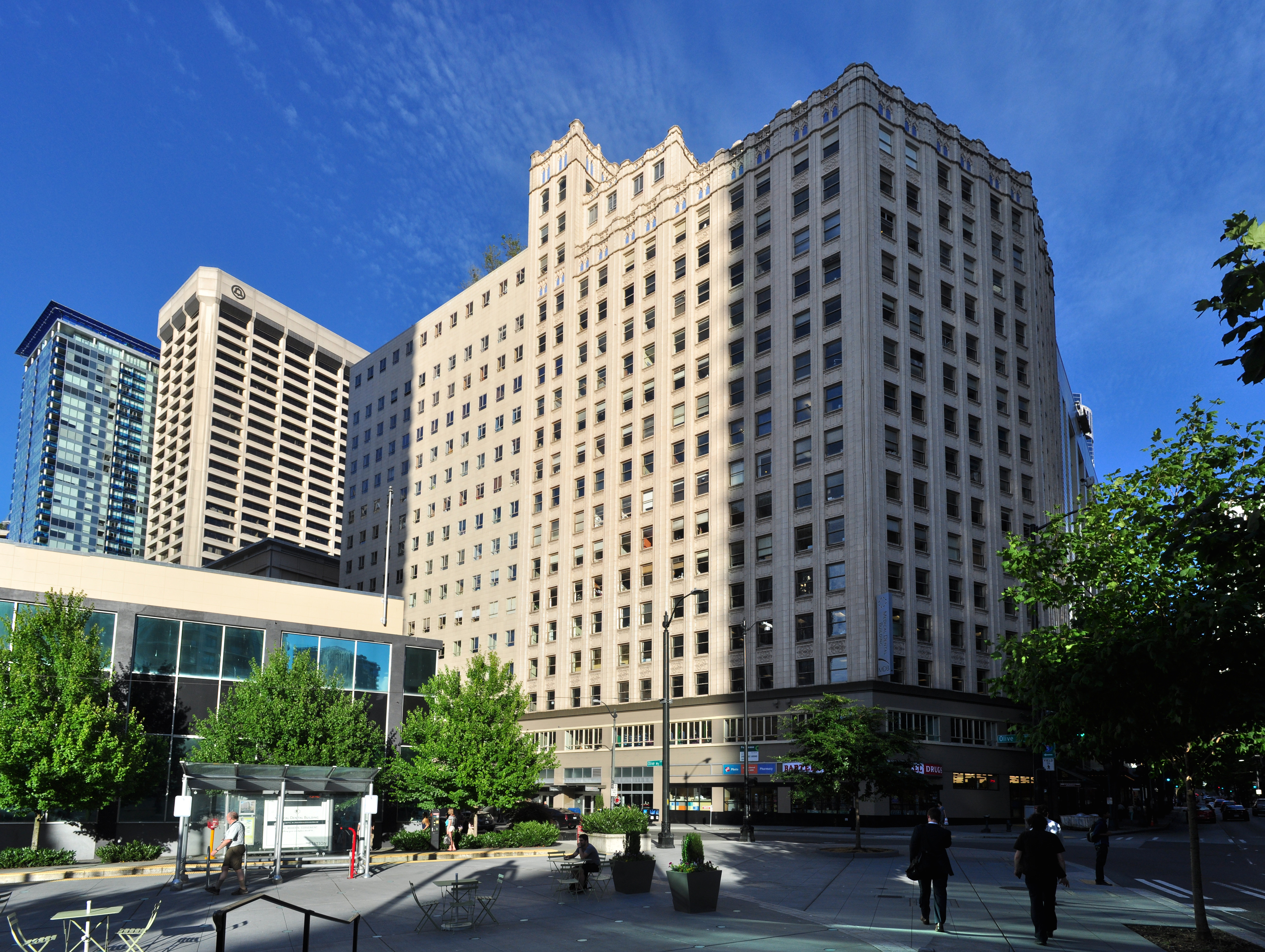
- The building's exterior in 2014

- Location within Downtown Seattle Location within Washington (state) Location within the United States
- Location: 509 Olive Way, Seattle, Washington
- Coordinates: 47°36′45.9″N 122°20′11.9″W
- Area: less than one acre
- Built: 1925, 1950, 2005
- Built by: A.W. Quist Company
- Architect: John Alfred Creutzer, Abraham H. Albertson (original); William Henry Fey (1950 addition)
- Architectural style: Late Gothic Revival
- NRHP reference No.: 06000371

Significant dates
- Added to NRHP: May 11, 2006
- Designated SEATL: December 11, 2006

The Medical Dental Building is a historic office building located in Downtown Seattle, near McGraw Square and adjacent to the Nordstrom Building.

== Description and history ==
The original half 18-story building was designed in the Late Gothic Revival style and features terra cotta cladding on top of a concrete frame. A later addition in 1950, in the Moderne style, extended the structure eastward and renovated most of the original building.

The construction of a medical and dental center in Seattle was proposed in 1921 by a group of businessmen in the respective industries. The $2 million building opened in May 1925 and was initially owned by the Bradner family, who subsequently owned The Bradner Building Company. It was designed by architect John Alfred Creutzer (1874–1929); architect Abraham H. Albertson (1872–1964) supervised its construction; A.W. Quist Company was the general contractor.

At the time it opened, it was the third-tallest building in the world to exclusively use reinforced concrete construction. The building continues to house medical and dental practices, as well as retail spaces. As of 2019, it has 130 tenants occupying 300,000 square feet (28,000 m^{2}) of office space.

The building was renovated in 2005 by Goodman Real Estate after the firm bought the property for $38 million. It was subsequently added to the National Register of Historic Places and declared a Seattle landmark. The building was sold to Menashe Properties of Portland in 2019 for $113 million.

== See also ==
- List of Seattle landmarks
- National Register of Historic Places listings in Seattle, Washington
