= Monte Cristo Hotel =

United States historic place in Everett, Washington

- U.S. National Register of Historic Places
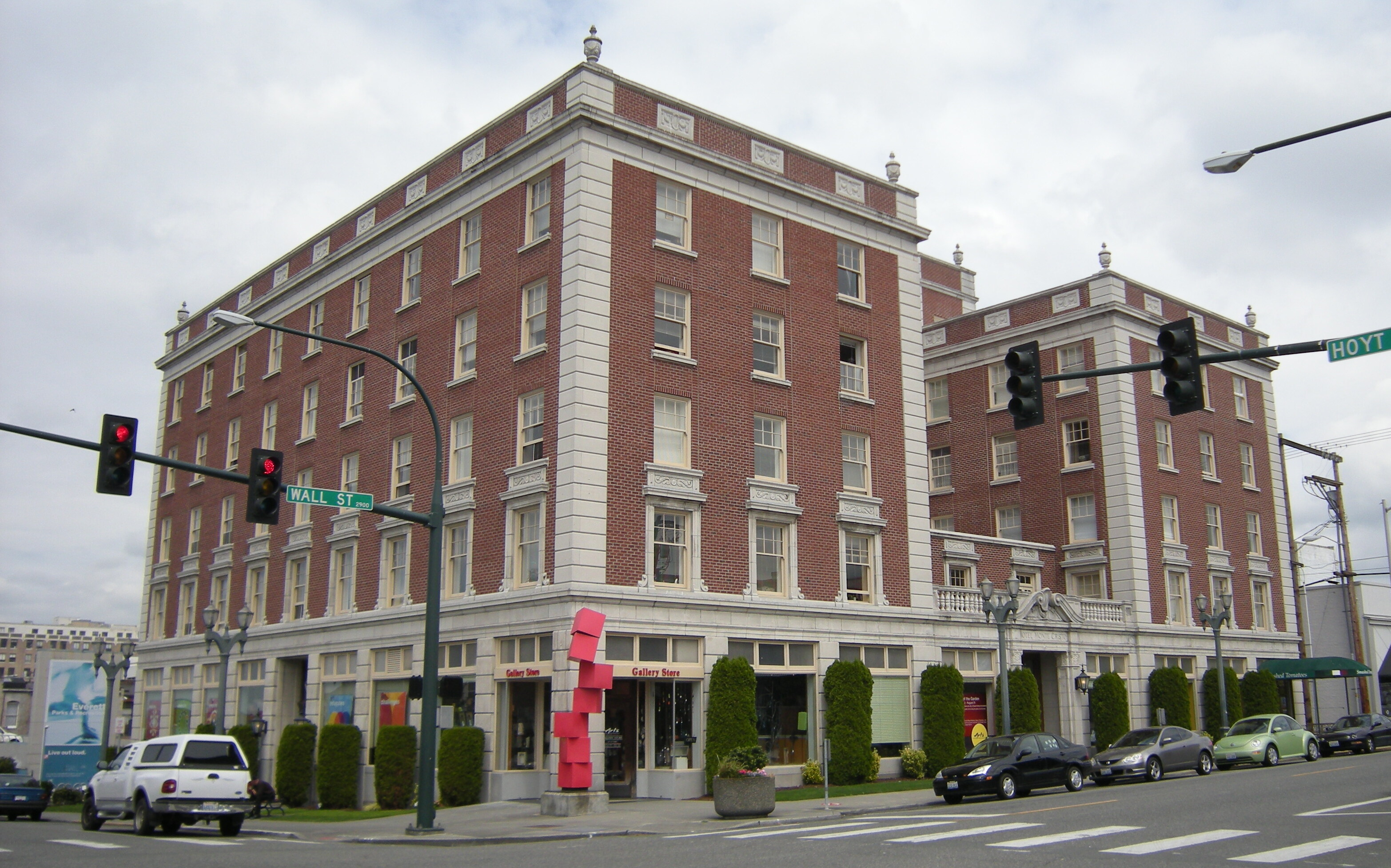
- The hotel in 2008

- Location within Washington (state) Location within the United States
- Interactive map showing the location of Monte Cristo Hotel
- Location: 1507 Wall St., Everett, Washington
- Coordinates: 47°58′41″N 122°12′30″W
- Area: less than 1 acre (0.40 ha)
- Built: 1925
- Built by: Alexander & MacNeil
- Architect: Henry Bittman
- Engineer: Henry Bittman
- Consulting architect: Abraham H. Albertson
- Architectural style: Second Renaissance Revival
- NRHP reference No.: 76001907
- Added to NRHP: June 3, 1976

The Monte Cristo Hotel is a historic building located in Everett, Washington. It is a major feature of the city's downtown core. It ceased functioning as a hotel in 1972. It was listed on the National Register of Historic Places on June 3, 1976. In 1994 it was restored and redeveloped into low income housing.

== History ==
The six story brick building was largest hotel project in Everett. It was built on the site of the original Monte Cristo Hotel, which opened in 1892 and had hosted the Providence Hospital from 1905 to 1924. Construction was a community project with hundreds of stockholders. Designed by Seattle architect Henry Bittman the hotel opened on May 29, 1925. The 120-foot (37 m) facade fronts on Wall Street looking south. The height of the building and its elevated position on the slope of downtown make it visible from some distance approaching the city from the south. This landmark was the town's important hotel and social center for over 40 years. The hotel closed in 1972.

The building was redeveloped and historically restored in 1994 to apartments, an arts venue and a wedding and banquet facility.

In 1991 after the building had been vacant about 20 years a group of investors spent about US$100,000 (equivalent to $236,379 in 2025) working on a redevelopment plan that fell through. Plans were announced in 1993 to renovate the building as low cost housing. At that time Mayor Pete Kinch described the Monte Cristo Hotel as a "bellwether of how we as a community are dealing with" the problem of downtown decline.

In August 1993 private developer Lojis Corp. had assembled a financing package for the redevelopment into low income housing. The package was contingent on leasing some of the building's space. A plan for the city to lease the space for an arts venue led to a lengthy city council debate. On August 25, 1993 the Everett City Council approved spending US$81,590 (equivalent to $181,844 in 2025) per year to lease 8,867 square feet (823.8 m^{2}) of space in the building, including the grand lobby, mezzanine and ballroom areas. By November of that year the building had been re–roofed, new sidewalks poured, new interior stairs built and exterior restoration started as part of a $6.8 million construction project. The Washington Community Renewal Association invested $3M and Lojis Corp. secured $3.8M in equity by selling $6.7M in federal historic and low income housing tax credits.

At a three-day grand reopening on June 10–12, 1994 Mayor Ed Hansen lauded Lojis president David Mandley for persevering in getting the project organized and skill in the historical restoration of the buildings exterior and common spaces. The guest rooms had been converted to 69 residential units which as a condition of using the tax credits must be rented to tenants with an income 60% or less of the area's median. Historic renovation and preservation were mandated by the use of the historic tax credits. Reporter Diane Brooks wrote in The Seattle Times, "Once a symbol of downtown decay, the hotel now symbolizes Everett's development boom". Popular downtown restaurant Passport moved into the Monte Cristo in 1994.

In 1997 the building was again serving as a civic center when a public forum for candidates for judge on the county superior court was held there. The building was home to the Everett Center for the Arts and the Arts Council of Snohomish County which displayed art in the grand lobby and mezzanine including shows and exhibitions. The Monte Cristo Ballroom was named Best Wedding Venue in a 2019 readers poll in The Herald Business Journal. All inclusive wedding packages were offered. The business closed abruptly on October 15, 2019. The Monte Cristo Awards, inspired by the building's quality, recognize neighbors who take pride in their property.

== See also ==
- National Register of Historic Places listings in Snohomish County, Washington
- Urban renewal
