= Providence Regional Medical Center Everett =

- Providence Health & Services
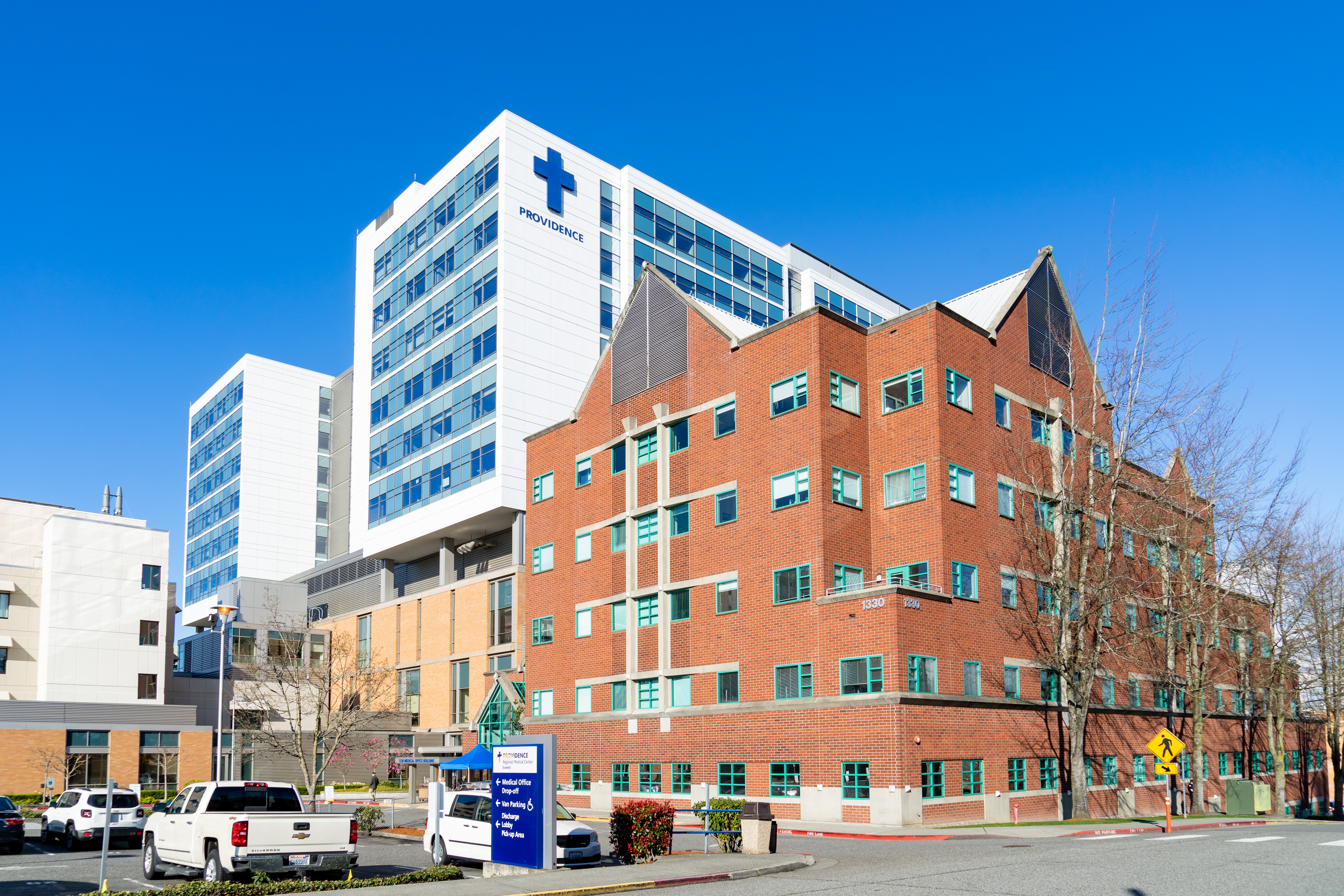
- Colby Campus

Geography
- Location: Everett, Snohomish County, Washington, United States
- Coordinates: 48.0011°N 122.2056°W

Organization
- Care system: Medicare/Medicaid/Charity/Public
- Type: General

Services
- Emergency department: Yes; Level II trauma center
- Beds: 448 (Colby Campus); 123 (Pacific Campus)

Helipads
- Helipad: FAA LID: 1WA4 (Pacific Campus) and 1WA5 (Colby Campus)

History
- Former names: Providence General Medical Center; Providence Everett Medical Center
- Opened: March 1, 1994 (merged hospital); 1905 (Providence Hospital); 1894 (Everett General Hospital)

Links
- Website: PRMCE Website
- Lists: Hospitals in Washington state

Providence Regional Medical Center Everett is a full-service medical center and the flagship hospital of Providence Health & Services, the largest faith-based healthcare system in the Northwestern United States. It serves patients from Snohomish County, Skagit County, Whatcom County, Island County, and San Juan County, Washington. Its two campuses are located in Downtown Everett, Washington.

The medical center was established in 1994 with the merger of the two hospitals in the city, Providence Hospital and Everett General Hospital. General Hospital became the Colby Campus site of the merged entity while Providence Hospital became the Pacific Campus site.

Providence Everett has over 3,000 employees and approximately 1,000 physicians on staff. It is currently licensed for 571 beds, with 448 at the Colby Campus and 123 at the Pacific Campus.

== History ==
Before the existence of Providence Regional Medical Center Everett, there were two hospitals within the city of Everett: Providence Hospital and General Hospital Medical Center.

Providence Hospital was created when the Sisters of Providence purchased the Monte Cristo Hotel in 1904 and converted it into a hospital with 75 beds, admitting its first patient on April 5, 1905. It was staffed by 11 Sisters and 3 other employees. In its first year, the new hospital served over 400 patients. In 1923, the Sisters of Providence borrowed $200,000 and built a new hospital with 126 beds adjacent to the old site, which opened on May 12, 1924. It underwent a further $14.5 million renovation in 1962.

General Hospital was founded by members of the Woman's Book Club of Everett in 1894, with the cornerstone being laid in an existing building at 3322 Broadway. In 1923, a group of businessmen rallied the community and raised $150,000 to purchase a new site and construct a modern hospital with 74 beds, which opened on February 27, 1924. It further expanded to 127 beds in 1949, and a seven-story, $782,000 patient care tower was completed in 1965. In 1990, the hospital elected to change its name to General Hospital Medical Center.

In 1994, Providence Hospital and General Hospital Medical Center merged, forming Providence General Medical Center. Rather than a merger of equals, Providence Hospital took over the operations of General Hospital, with the merged entity recognizing the founding of Providence Hospital as its own founding. The name was changed again in 2000 to Providence Everett Medical Center. In 2002, the five-story Pavilion for Women and Children opened at the Pacific campus. It was followed by the establishment of Providence Everett Healthcare Clinic in 2004. In 2007, Providence partnered with local care providers to open the Providence Regional Cancer Partnership, offering outpatient oncology programs. In 2008, to better reflect its role in the area, the hospital changed its name to Providence Regional Medical Center Everett. The Marshall and Katherine Cymbaluk Medical Tower opened at the Colby campus in June 2011.

PRMCE is one of several Level II trauma centers in the state of Washington.

The first U.S. case of COVID-19 was identified in a patient at Providence Regional Medical Center on January 20, 2020.

In October 2019, professional and technical employees at the hospital represented by the United Food and Commercial Workers (UFCW) authorized a strike, citing what they perceived were inadequate offers from hospital administrators; both sides eventually reached an agreement on January 8, 2020, after the union announced plans to strike the prior week. More than a year later, on June 4, 2021, nurses at the hospital additionally represented by the union authorized a strike as well despite beginning negotiations with hospital administrators in October 2020; they also cited inadequate offers from the administrators along with major stress and resulting burnout due to the COVID-19 pandemic.

== Locations ==
Hospital
Colby Campus

- Critical and Acute Care
- ICU and CCU
- Surgery
- Telemetry
- Emergency Department
- Cardiac Surgery Single Stay Unit

Pacific Campus

- Outpatient surgeries with the ability to allow for overnight stays
- Transitional and long-term care
- Inpatient and outpatient rehabilitation therapies
- Inpatient and outpatient recovery programs for chemical dependency
- Children's health and developmental care

Pavilion for Women and Children (Pacific Campus)

- The Family Maternity Center
- Neonatal Intensive Care Unit
- The Pavilion Boutique
- Children's Center and Seattle Children's Everett
- The Breast Center

Providence Everett Healthcare Clinic

Providence General Foundation

- Raise funds to promote health and wellness through Providence Regional Medical Center Everett

Providence Hospice and Home Care of Snohomish County

- Management of health care problems and life-threatening illnesses
- End-of-life care

Providence Medical Group

Providence Regional Cancer Partnership

- Commission on Cancer (CoC) accredited program

== Rankings ==
In 2012 Providence Regional Medical Center Everett was recognized in:

- Becker's Hospital Review "100 Great Hospitals"
- U.S. News & World Report's "America's Best Hospitals"

- Strong performance in Washington state
- Top-ranking in Puget Sound region and Seattle metro area
- Adult Specialty, high-performing in Pulmonology

The hospital is also the recipient of several HealthGrades awards.

- 5 Overall Hospital Awards in Emergency Medicine (2011, 2010), Patient Safety (2011, 2010), and Distinguished Hospitals for Clinical Excellence (2010)
- 4 Specialty Excellence Awards in Critical Care (2012, 2011, 2010), and Stroke Care (2010)
