= Everett City Hall =

- U.S. National Register of Historic Places
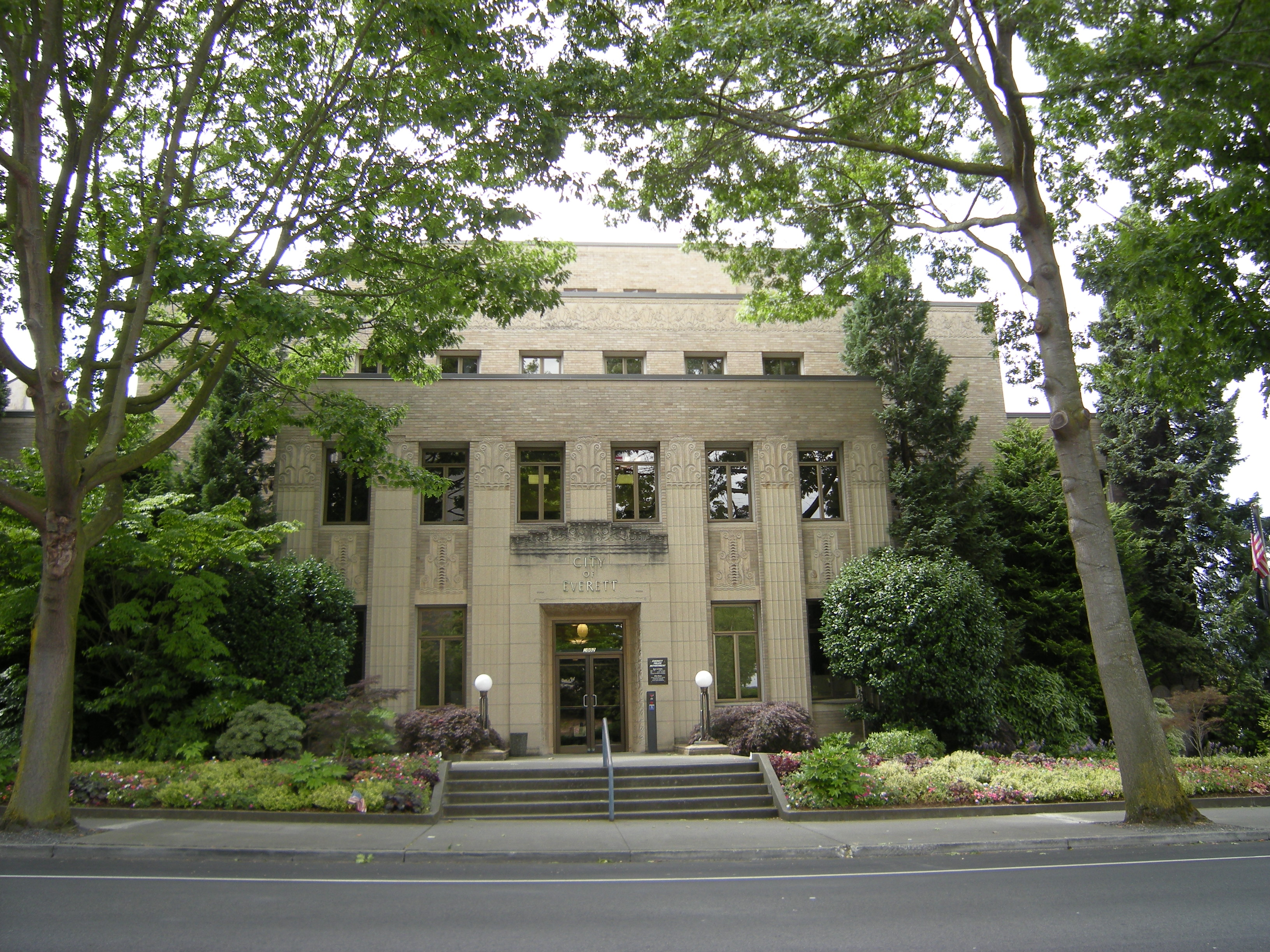

- Location within Washington (state) Location within the United States
- Location: 3002 Wetmore Ave., Everett, Washington
- Coordinates: 47°58′39″N 122°12′22″W
- Area: less than one acre
- Architect: Abraham H. Albertson
- Architectural style: Art Deco
- NRHP reference No.: 90000674
- Added to NRHP: May 2, 1990

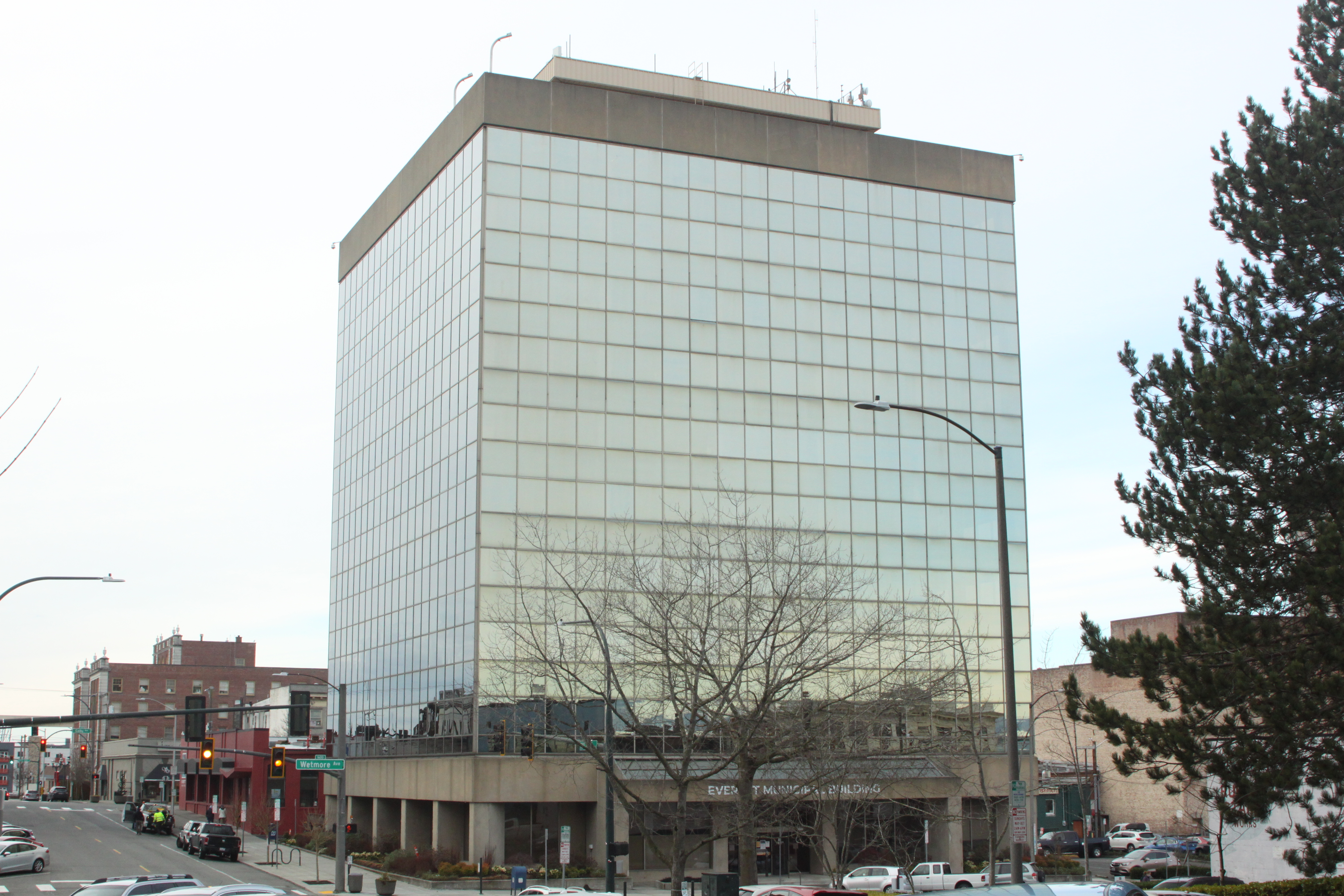
Everett Municipal Building (formerly the Wall Street Building), the main city government building since 1993

Everett City Hall is the name given to a building located in Everett, Washington, listed on the National Register of Historic Places. The building originally served as the city hall when it was built in 1929; it was extensively renovated from 1977 to 1979, with the city renting the Roosevelt School from the Everett School District during that time. However, for all practical purposes, it no longer serves this role; the mayor's office and city administration were relocated to the nearby Wall Street Building, which the city bought in 1991 for $11.2 million, around 1993. The building is currently used by the police department and by the city council to hold public meetings.

== Renaming effort ==
In the summer of 2011, members of the community proposed that the building be renamed "William E. Moore Historic City Hall" in honor of Bill Moore, who served as mayor of Everett from 1977 to 1990. However, the nonprofit group Historic Everett pointed out that the proposal violates a city policy that prohibits renaming buildings that are on historical registries. The city council voted unanimously in 2012 to relax the naming policy, and also name the building after Moore. A formal dedication ceremony was held on September 13, 2014, installing a plaque at the building.

== See also ==
- List of mayors of Everett, Washington
- National Register of Historic Places listings in Snohomish County, Washington
