= Seattle Tower =

Skyscraper in downtown Seattle, Washington, U.S.

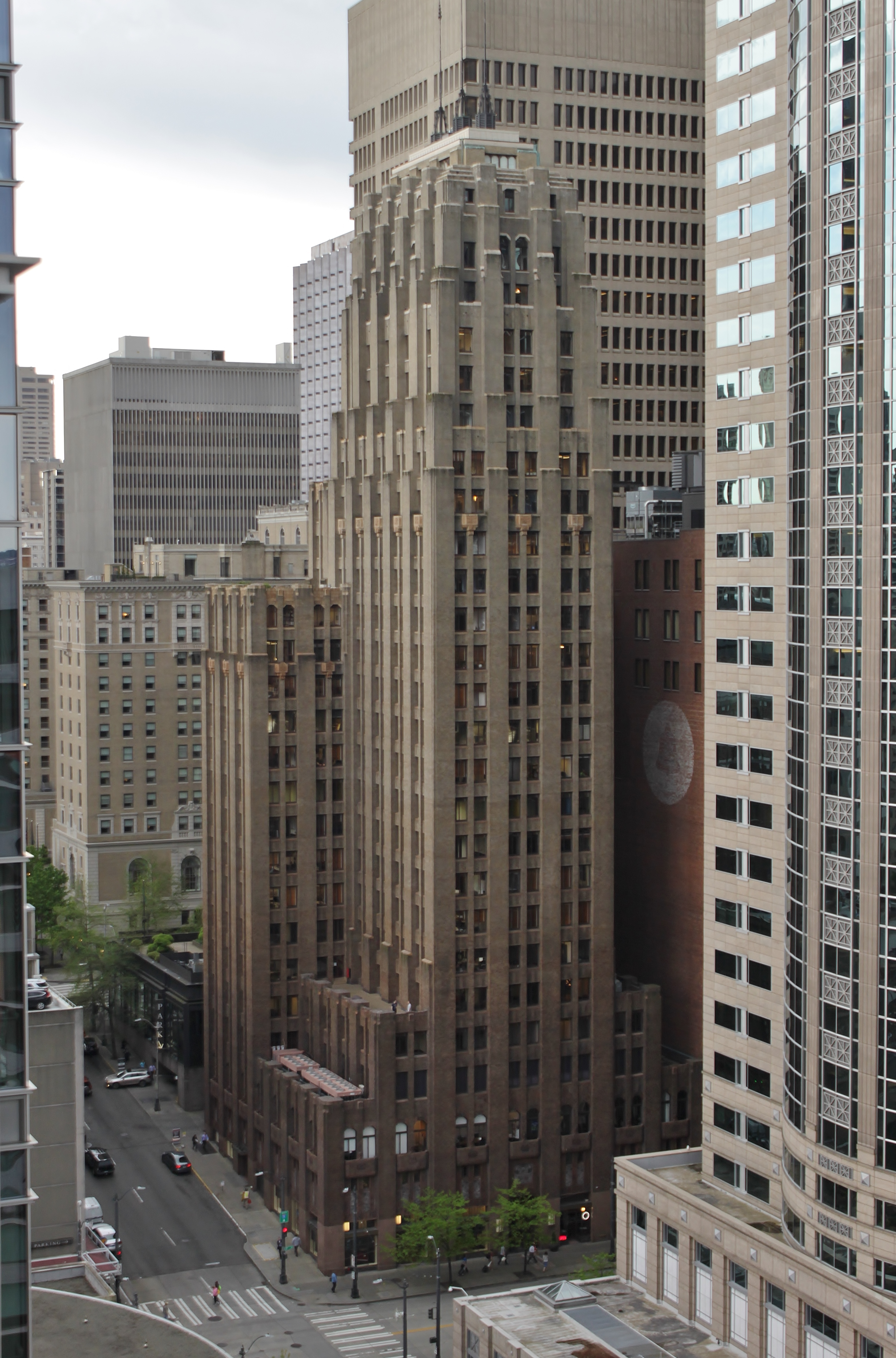
- Viewed from the Russell Investments Center

- Location within Downtown Seattle
- Former names: Northern Life Tower

General information
- Type: office
- Location: 1218 Third Avenue, Seattle, Washington, U.S.
- Coordinates: 47.6077°N 122.3355°W
- Groundbreaking: February 17, 1928
- Opened: March 1929

Height
- Antenna spire: 106.6 m (350 ft)
- Roof: 105.7 m (347 ft)

Technical details
- Floor count: 27

Design and construction
- Architect: Albertson, Wilson & Richardson

References
- Northern Life Tower
- U.S. National Register of Historic Places
- Seattle Landmark
- Location within Washington (state) Location within the United States
- Coordinates: 47°36′29″N 122°20′3″W
- Built: 1928
- Architect: Abraham H. Albertson
- Architectural style: Art Deco, Modernistic
- NRHP reference No.: 75001857
- Added to NRHP: May 30, 1975

The Seattle Tower, originally known as the Northern Life Tower, is a 27-story skyscraper in downtown Seattle, Washington. The building is located on 1218 Third Avenue and is known as Seattle's first art-deco tower. Its distinctive, ziggurat exterior is clad in 33 shades of brick designed to effect a gradient which lightens from the bottom to the top of the building. This is said to have been inspired by local rock formations.

According to the US National Park Service website:

The Northern Life Insurance Company was founded in Seattle by D. B. and T. M. Morgan, with assets of $170,232 and a 12 by 12 foot office in the Colman Building. As the firm prospered, it was moved to larger offices where it remained until, after the death of T. M. Morgan in 1919. D. B. Morgan then decided to construct his own building "finer than anything on the Pacific Coast." The plan to construct the building at a cost of $1.5 million was announced in April 1927. Originally a 24-story building, the Northern Life Tower was increased to 27 stories and when completed was one floor higher above sea level than the Smith Tower, which had previously been referred to as "the tallest building west of the Mississippi." Completed in 1928, the Northern Life Tower--a true skyscraper--represents a dramatic shift in the appearance of Seattle's skyline. Earlier 20th-century buildings had derived their style from classical precedents. But by the 1920s, architects began to favor designs that attempted to emulate the speed, efficiency and power found within technology, perceived by many as humanity's hope for the future. The Northern Life Tower was the first building in Seattle to illustrate this style, now known as Art Deco or Art Moderne. Derived from Eliel Saarinen's famous, second-place proposal for the Chicago Tribune contest, the Northern Life Tower building beautifully illustrates the increasing popularity of a simple, smooth, almost machine-like exterior. This faith in progress also appeared in the lighting that once fully illuminated the building: more than 200 floodlights faded into one another in a "phantasmagoric display" meant to imitate the aurora borealis, a play on the Northern Life Insurance Company's name and an illustration of the belief that science could imitate nature's most incredible wonders. Today the lights are gone, and taller, newer skyscrapers dwarf the building, but it remains one of the Northwest's most elegant Art-Deco buildings.

The building was added to the National Register of Historic Places in 1975 and is also a designated city landmark.

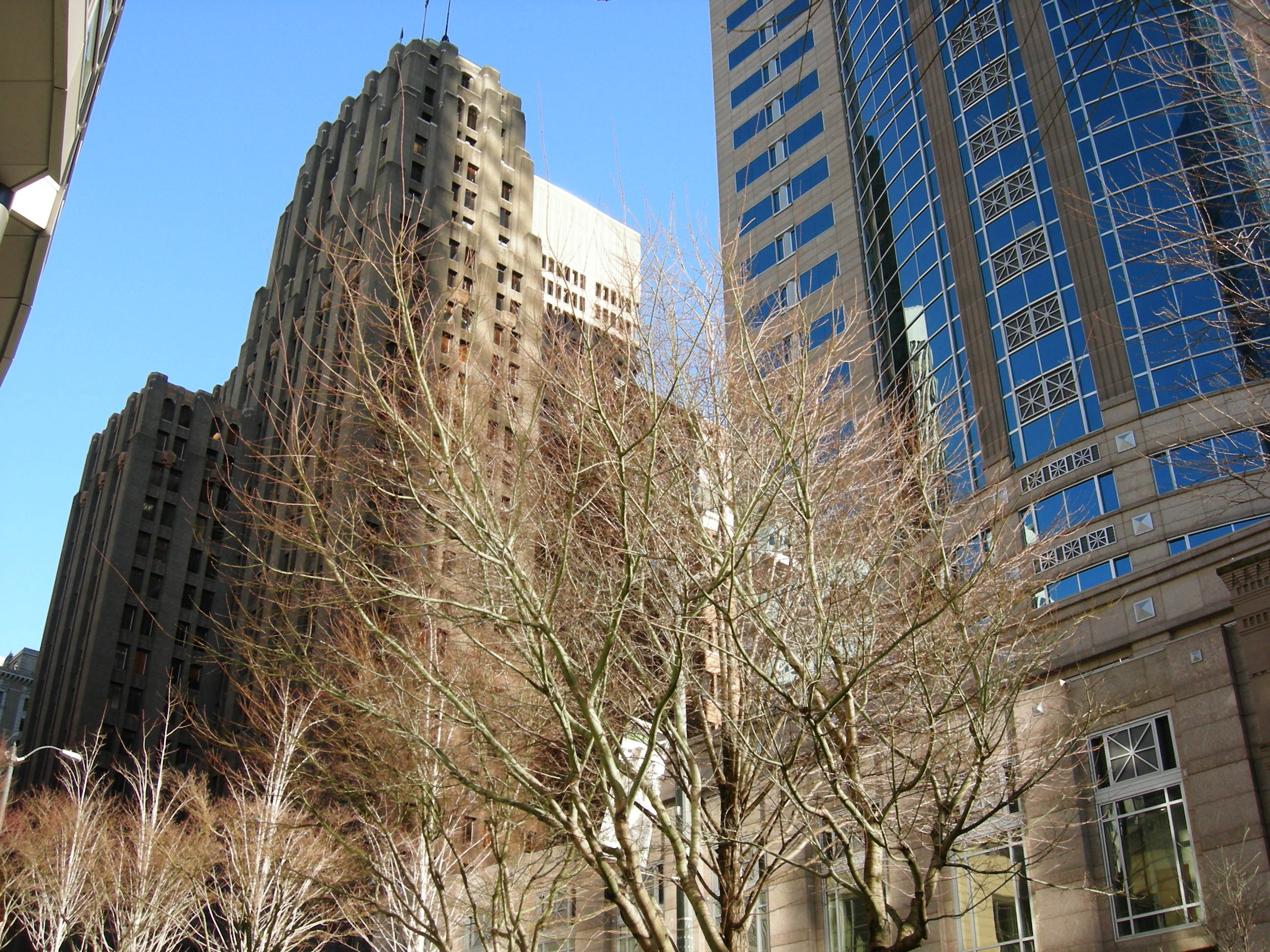

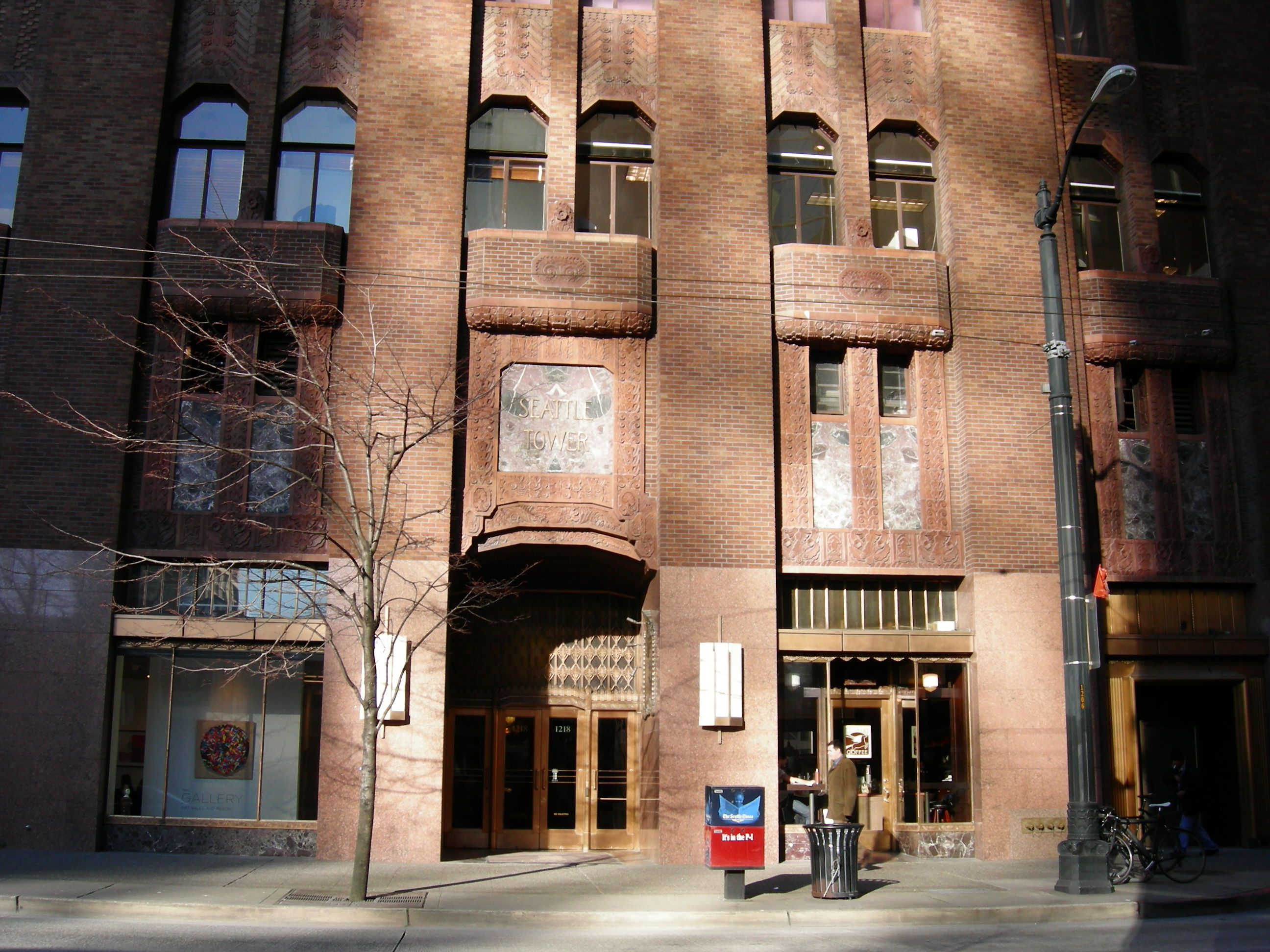

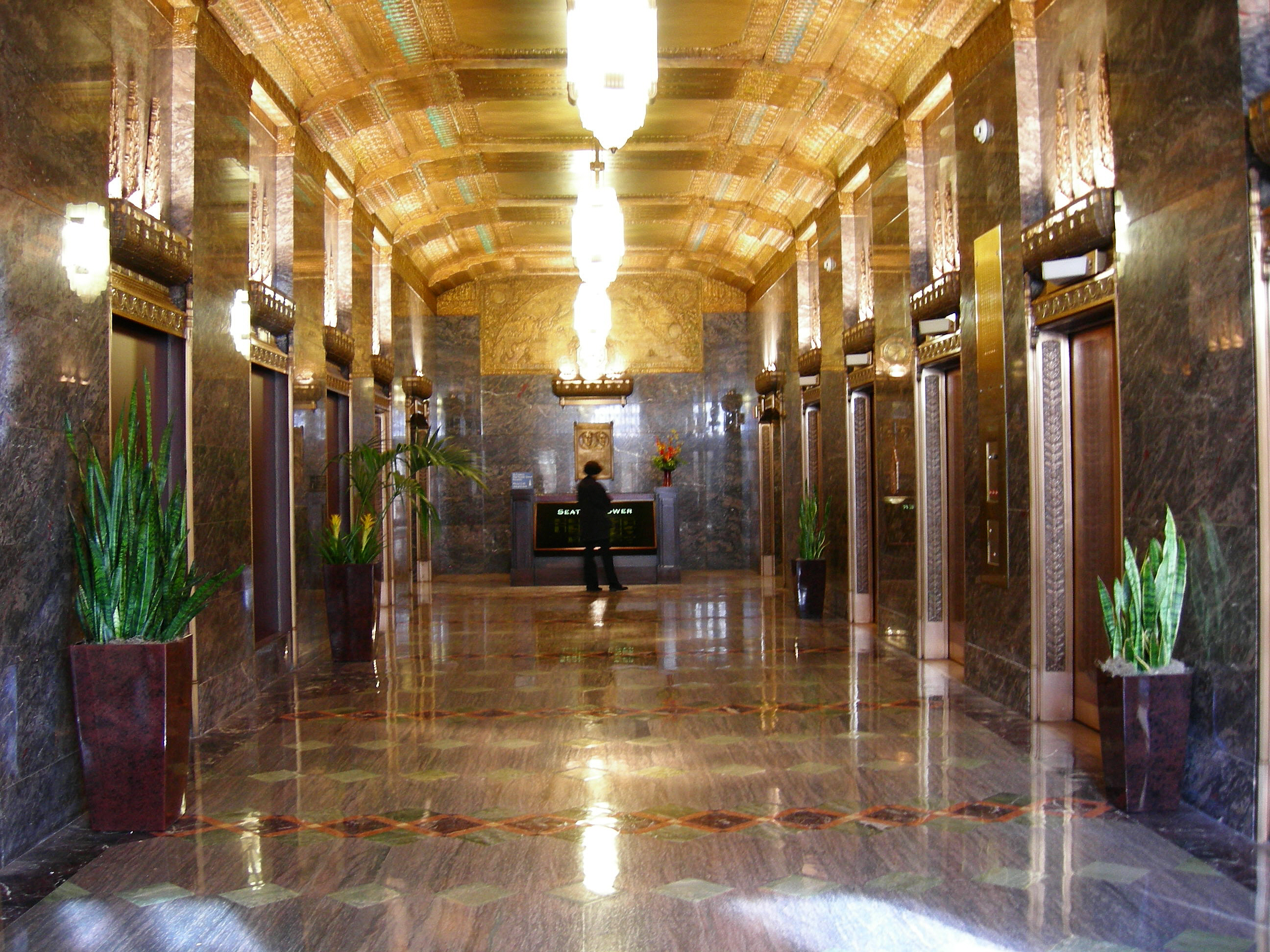
