= Vancouver Telephone Building =

- U.S. National Register of Historic Places
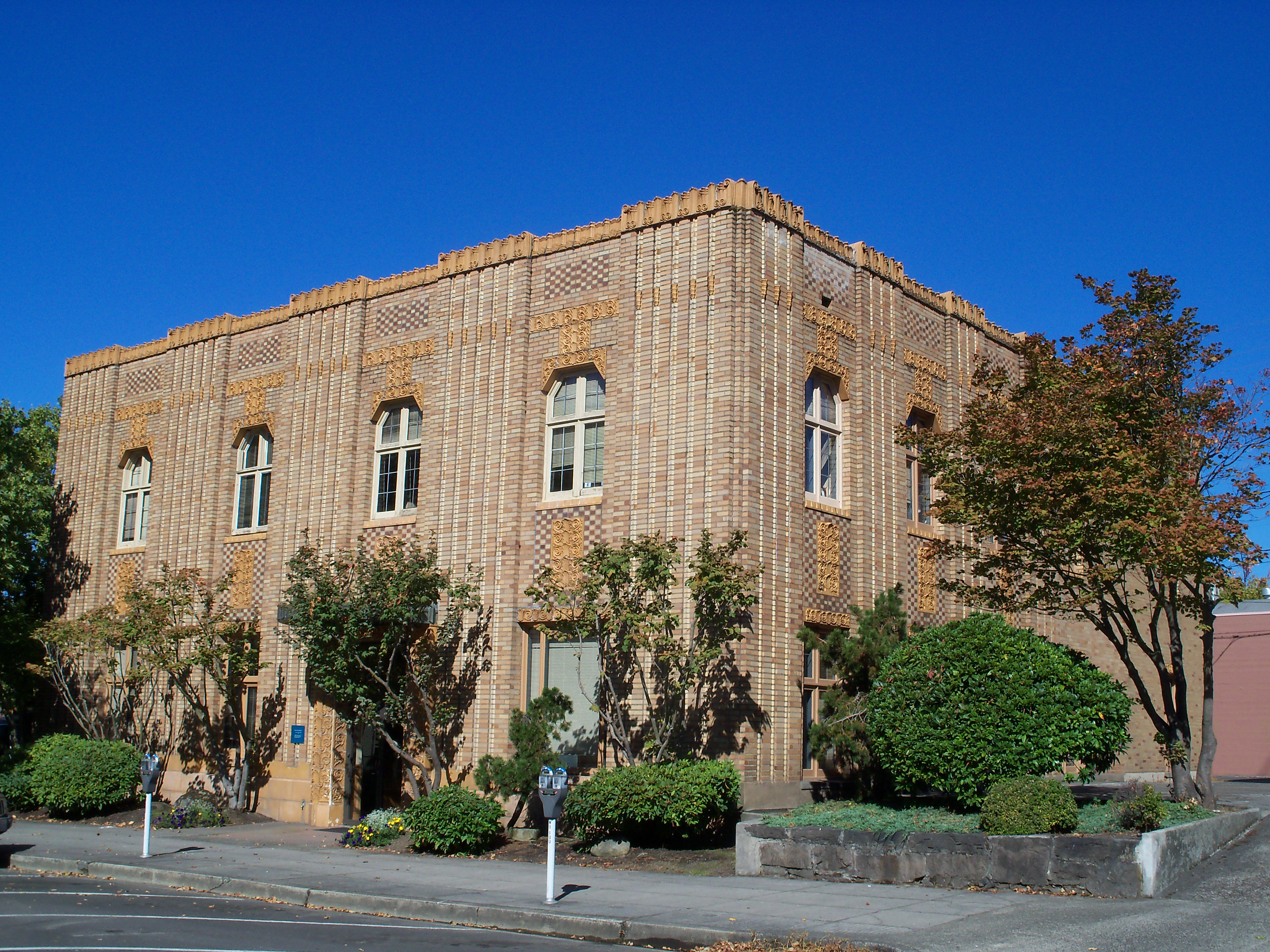

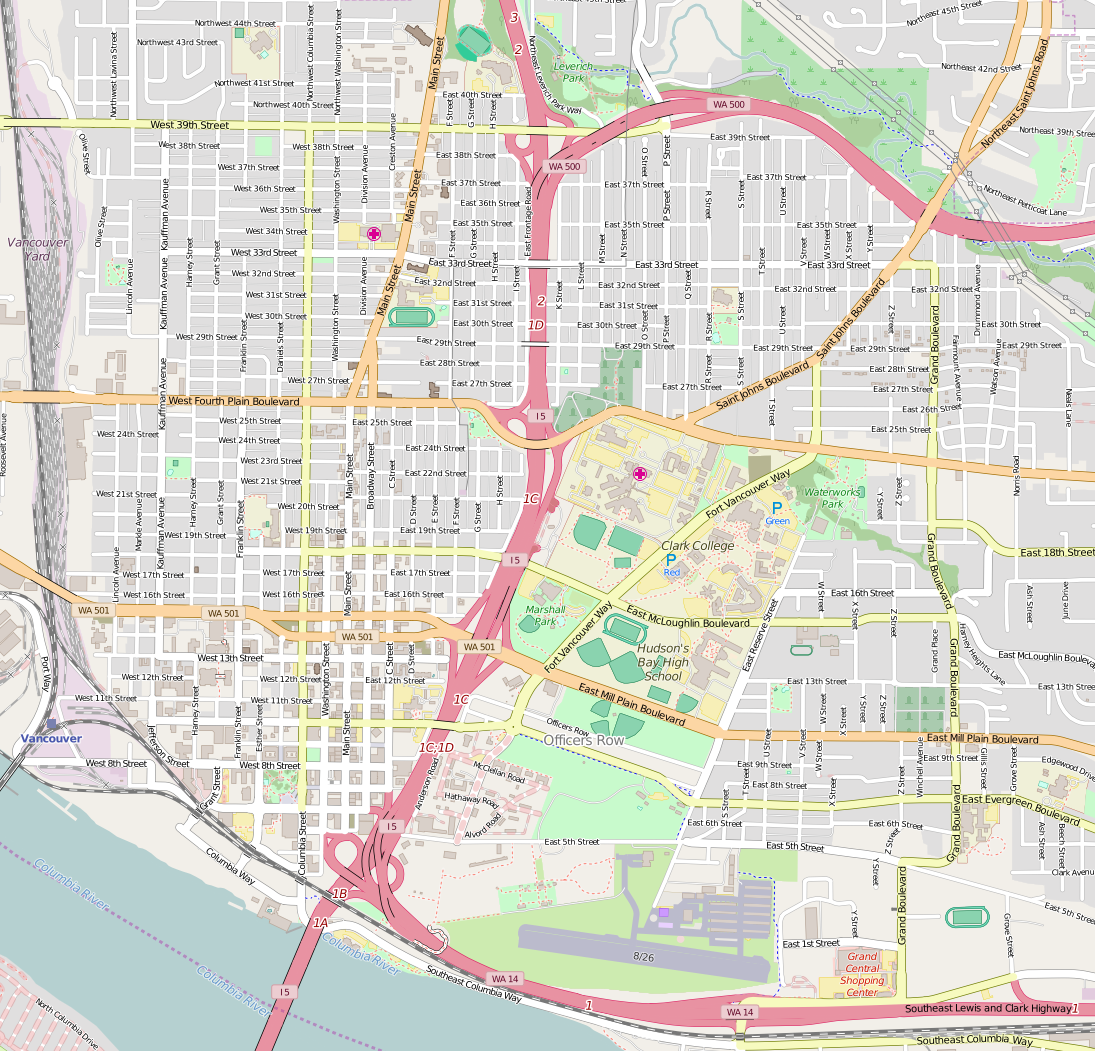
- Location within Vancouver Washington Location within Washington (state) Location within the United States
- Location: 112 W. Eleventh, Vancouver, Washington
- Coordinates: 45°37′48″N 122°40′16″W
- Area: less than one acre
- Built: 1934
- Architect: Albertson, Wilson & Richardson
- Architectural style: Modernistic
- NRHP reference No.: 86003092
- Added to NRHP: November 6, 1986

The Vancouver Telephone Building is a historic building located at 112 West Eleventh Street in Vancouver, Washington. It was completed in 1934 and was listed on the National Register of Historic Places on November 6, 1986.

== See also ==
- National Register of Historic Places listings in Clark County, Washington
