= United Shopping Tower =

- U.S. National Register of Historic Places
- Seattle Landmark
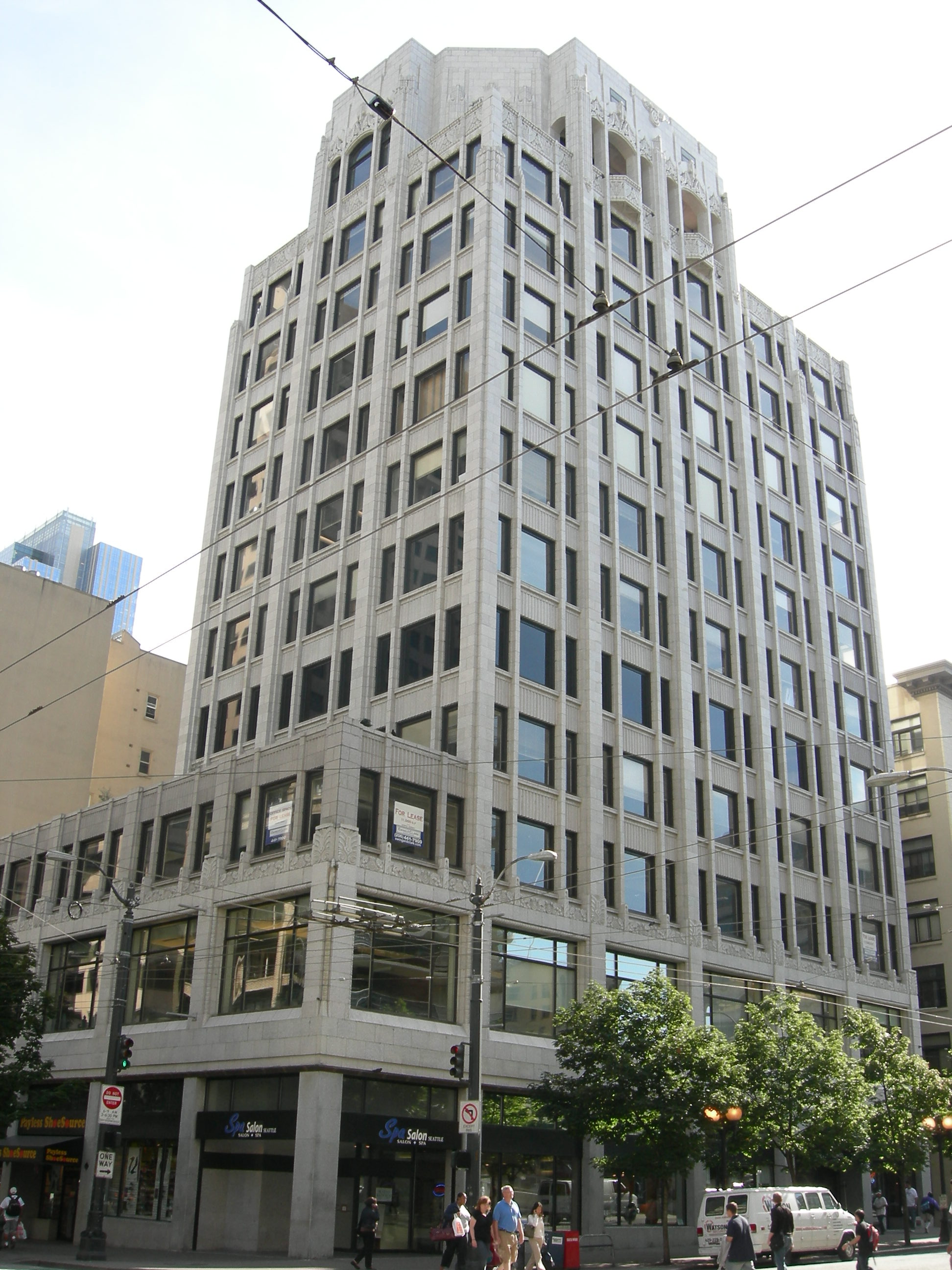
- Location: 217 Pine St. Seattle, Washington
- Coordinates: 47°36′38″N 122°20′14″W
- Built: 1929, 1939,41 (additions)
- Architect: Henry Bittman
- Architectural style: Art Deco, neo-Gothic
- NRHP reference No.: 80004004

Significant dates
- Added to NRHP: August 18, 1980
- Designated SEATL: May 11, 1987

The Olympic Tower, originally known as the United Shopping Tower, then the Northwestern Mutual Insurance Building, and later, the Olympic Savings Tower, is a historic 12-story office tower located in Seattle, Washington and listed on the National Register of Historic Places. It was originally built in 1929 at the Southwest corner of Third Avenue and Pine Street for the United Pacific Corporation under the control of Seattle investment firm Drumheller, Ehrlichman and White. It was designed by Henry Bittman who also designed additions to the building in 1939.

The building consists of a ten-story reinforced concrete and terra cotta tower setback from 3rd Avenue but flush with Pine Street, on top of a three-story (originally two-story) base that fills the 113-by-108-foot (34 by 33 m) lot. A large part of the facade consists of large windows bringing natural light into almost every interior space. It was reported at the time of construction that the shopping tower had more glass in proportion to its size than any other building in Seattle.

The building's original purpose was to house retail tenants, one per floor with a tea room on the tenth floor. The building was an early incarnation of the indoor shopping center and the only of its kind in the Pacific Northwest. Also in the original plans, grass was to be planted on the roof of the second floor for a putting green owned by a sporting goods store on the third floor (the base of the tower). By the end of 1932 the vertical retail concept, already hobbled by the onset of the Great Depression, proved to be a failure and the building was converted into offices for the Northwestern Mutual Insurance Company. It later housed the headquarters for the Olympic Savings Bank, after whose closure in 1994 was sold to private investors and converted into office space. The building became a City of Seattle Landmark on May 18, 1987.

== History ==
=== Plans announced ===
In late 1928, the Southwest corner of Third Avenue and Pine street in Seattle's burgeoning midtown retail district, then occupied by the aging Melrose Hotel, was purchased from the Gottstein Estate by United Shopping Tower Inc., a company created by the United Pacific Corporation specifically to own the property which was in turn a subsidiary of Drumheller, Ehrlichman & White investment bankers. In September 1928, an announcement was made by United Pacific for plans of a $700,000 retail tower on the prominent site that would rise ten, later revised to twelve, stories. Each floor of the building would have one single specialty retail tenant with a tea room at the top. Henry Broderick, Inc. would manage the property.

=== Construction begins ===
Demolition of the old Melrose Hotel began on December 3, 1928. The building, originally a Victorian lodging house known as the Rosedale, was built in 1890 at the current site of the central post office. It was moved to 3rd Avenue and Pine Street in seven pieces in 1901 to make way for the post office's construction where it gained a new ground floor of brick as a result of the Denny Regrade and became the Federal Hotel. It was later clad completely in brick in an attempt to modernize.

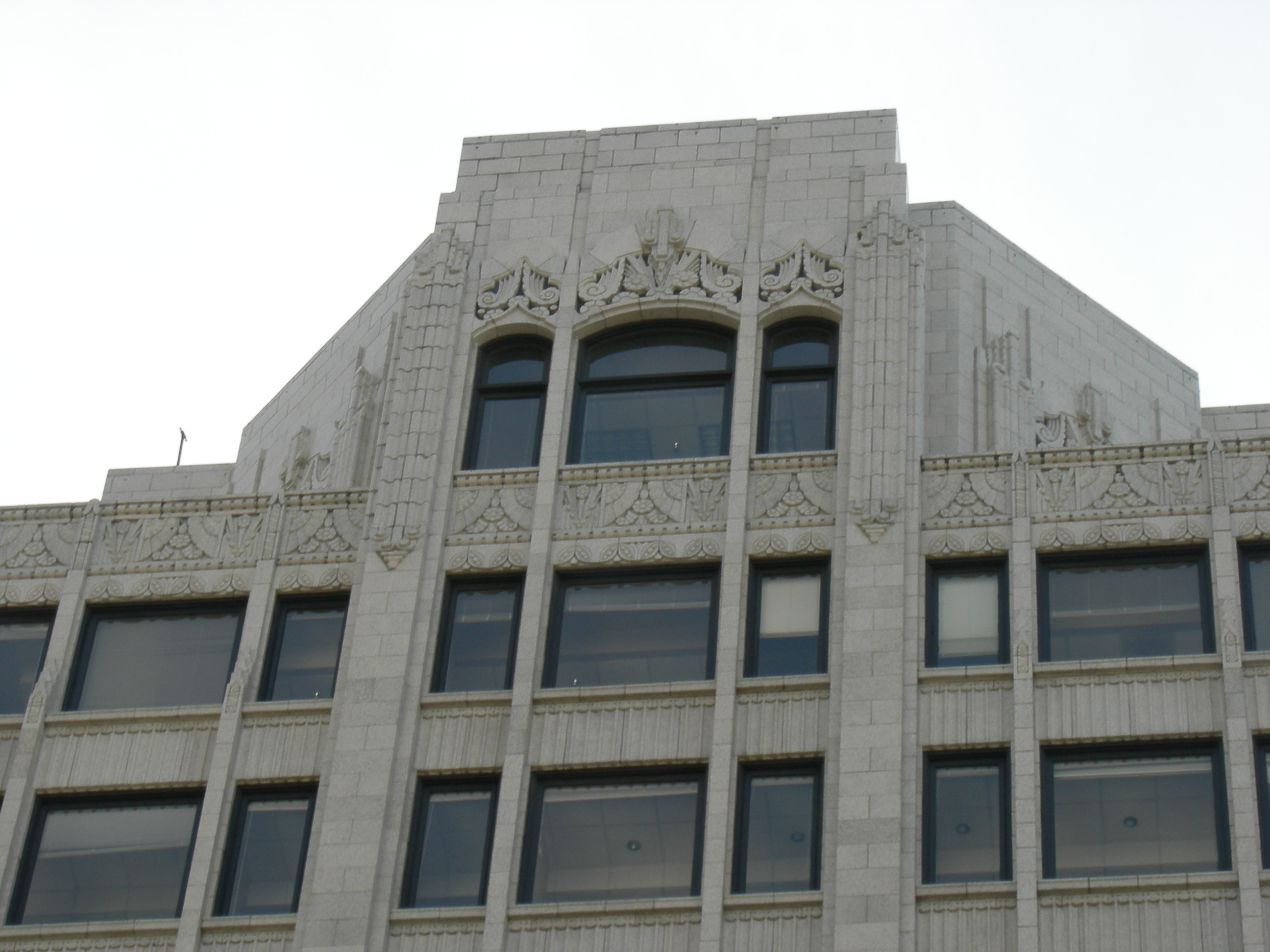
Close-up of elaborate terracotta at the tower's 12th floor

As the site was cleared, architect Bittman awarded the construction contract to Hendrickson & Alstrom, general contractors. The University Brick & Tile Company once located on E. 40th street in the University District was responsible for much of the building's exterior terracotta. Construction began in January 1929 and was mostly completed by late August. Among the first tenants to sign on for the unique new building was the Shopping Tower Bargain Basement, a newly formed discount department store that would occupy the entire basement. Puget Sound Power and Light Company and Western Union also signed leases for space. Most of the twelfth floor was leased to Gene Hanner for a photography studio. A superficial 13th floor located below the roof was used for storage.

=== Building opens to public ===
The grand opening of the Bargain Basement on October 26, 1929 also marked the unofficial opening of the Shopping tower, though still not fully completed. With several more tenants secured it officially opened to the public on November 2, 1929. The lobby of the building, on Pine Street, was decorated with marble and mahogany trimming and featured display cases for the various retail tenants to display their wares. Two high-speed, micro-leveling, signal controlling Otis elevators that served the building were also decorated with marble and bronze. A unique feature of the building at the time was the inclusion of a rooftop garden:

The setback of the tower at the twelfth floor provides a balcony on the Pine Street side, adjoining Gene Hanner's photographic studio, which has been converted into an open garden promenade in which tall shrubs and plants, many of them visible from the street, provide an unusual atmosphere in the downtown section. - The Seattle Times

Later in 1929, radio station KPBC, the predecessor to KIRO, opened a new studio in the building. The renamed station would move to the Cobb Building in 1935.

=== Northwestern Mutual Insurance Building ===
While a novel concept at first, the Great Depression soon revealed that the vertical shopping concept was not good for businesses trying to make themselves as accessible as possible to what few people were still freely spending money. In December 1932, the Northwestern Mutual Fire Association, the nation's biggest fire insurance company at the time, signed a ten-year lease with the Gottstein Estate for the majority of the vacated space in the building and renamed it the Northwestern Mutual Insurance Building. In February 1933, following $40,000 in renovations including remodeling the lobby and the addition of a new scientific sprinkler system, the company moved their offices from the Central Building in the financial district to the former shopping tower where they would occupy the basement, 2nd, 3rd, 10th, 11th and 12th floors. Remaining retail tenants occupying the basement and second floors were forced to vacate.

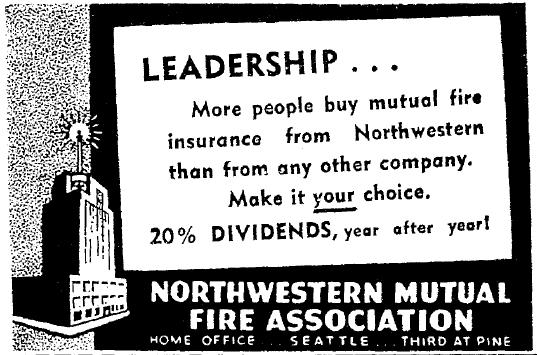
A Northwest Mutual ad from 1940 showing the tower with spire

The original plans for the building had called for a mast consisting of a ten foot copper base on a concrete pedestal holding a 30-foot (9.1 m) tall pole surmounted by a zinc ball 16-inches in diameter. A mast wasn't built until 1937 and of a heavier design than originally intended. From late 1939 to early 1940, the 60-foot (18 m) spire was used as a light-up "thermometer" to gauge the progress of Seattle's Community Campaign fund. The lighting was divided into six sections each representing $100,000 donated to the fund and another section would light up each time a goal was met. The airway beacon at the top represented the final goal. In 1971 the mast was removed due to maintenance problems.

In late 1939, Northwest Mutual commissioned the building's original architect, Henry Bittman, to design a 7,200-square-foot (670 m^{2}) expansion to the building's third floor for the insurance company's use that would blend in with the original design. Another major expansion in 1941 was completed to accommodate district offices of the Richfield Oil Corporation. During this expansion the tower was expanded 55 feet (17 m) west to the alley. In 1943, the entire second floor was taken over by the Induction Center of Western Washington for Men which handled Selective Service during World War II.

In the 1950s, a remodel occurred which removed most of the decorative features of the lobby including the ornamental bronze elevator doors. The lobby was also made smaller by additional retail space.

=== Olympic Tower and later years ===
In 1974, Northwestern Mutual became the Unigard Insurance Group and moved most of their offices to the recently completed Financial Center at Fourth and Seneca Streets but retained a small office in the building until 1976. Following Unigard's departure, the building was briefly retitled the "Insurance Building" in hopes of attracting other insurance firms but after a brief vacancy in the late 1970s, the building was purchased by Securities Financial, Inc. in 1979. That company was a subsidiary of Olympic Savings & Loan Association, a bank started in Bremerton, Washington in 1964. Olympic carried out an extensive renovation of the interior and exterior of the building. Intrusive additions to the storefronts were removed and the facade was cleaned. Other improvements included updated mechanical systems and the removal of an unused freight elevator. Following the restoration, Securities Financial nominated the building for the National Register of Historic Places, to which it was accepted the following year.

In early 1980, the building became the headquarters for Olympic Savings and was officially retitled the Olympic Tower and included a branch bank on the ground floor. Following Olympic Saving's demise in 1993, the tower was purchased by the Singaporean investment corporation, Duchess Properties Ltd., led by Liu Shek Yuen. The building is currently owned by Olympic Tower LLC and houses offices and condominia.

== See also ==
- List of landmarks in Seattle
- National Register of Historic Places listings in King County, Washington#Seattle
