= Covington Electrical Substation, Bonneville Power Administration =

- U.S. National Register of Historic Places
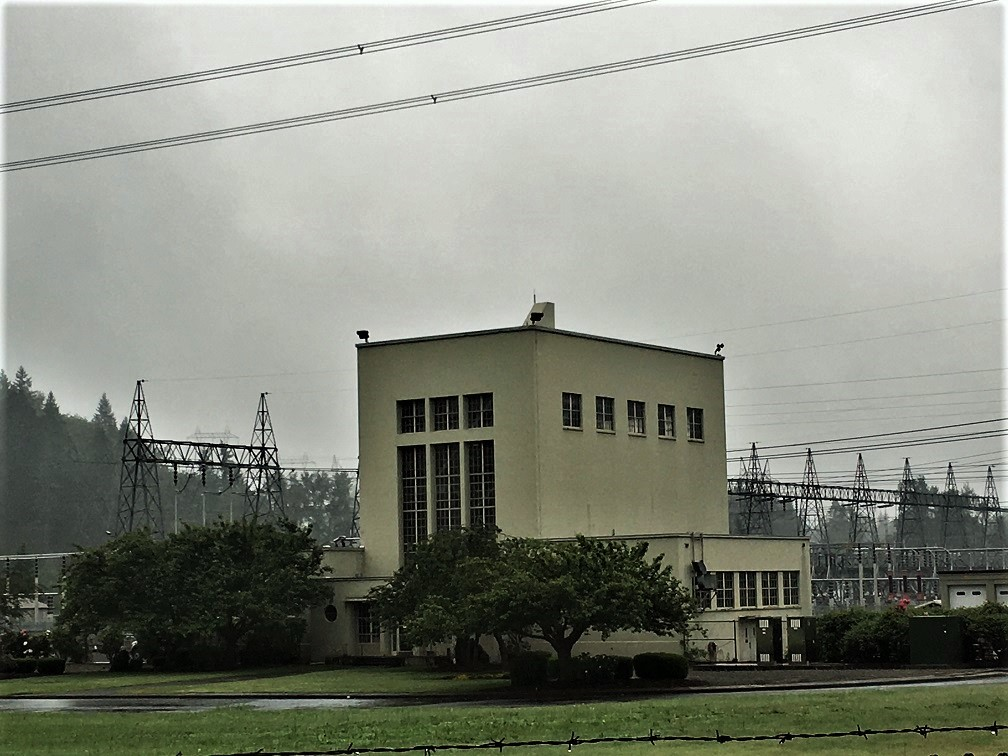
- Northeast view of Covington Electrical Substation untanking tower

- Location within Washington (state)
- Location: 28401 Covington Way SE, Covington, Washington
- Coordinates: 47.34919°N 122.11969°W
- Area: 36.93 acres (14.95 ha)
- Built: 1941
- Built by: C. F. Davidson Company
- Architectural style: Modern Movement
- NRHP reference No.: 100002475
- Added to NRHP: May 29, 2018

The Covington Electrical Substation, Bonneville Power Administration is an electrical substation in Covington, Washington. It was added to the National Register of Historic Places on May 29, 2018.

== History ==
The Bonneville Power Administration (BPA) brought power from the Bonneville Dam, the first federally-generated electrical power on the Columbia River, to areas of the Puget Sound. The BPA established the Covington Substation in 1940–1942, one of fourteen substations in the original "master grid".

The Covington site was cleared as a Works Progress Administration (WPA) project. Coming online on March 3, 1942, the Covington Substation connected the electrical systems of Seattle City Light and Tacoma City Light. When the BPA decided to connect the grid to the Coulee Dam as well, providing redundancy in case of national emergency, a line was built over the Cascade Mountains linking the Coulee Dam to the Covington Substation.

The main structures are built in Streamline Moderne style, common in industrial design at the time. The structures that contribute to the Historic designation are the untanking tower, control house, switchyard, heavy machinery and equipment maintenance (HMEM) shop (added in 1953), communication building (added in 1958), automotive storage building (added in 1959), maintenance warehouse (added in 1959), control house flammable storage (added in 1966), microwave tower (c. 1966), and engine generator building (added in 1973).

The most visible structure is the untanking tower, which services the oil-filled transformers in the switchyard. Unlike typical BPA substations where the oil pumps would be housed in a separate structure, the oil pumps at the Covington Substation were in the basement of the untanking tower. The untanking tower is a flat-roofed building, 63 feet (19 m) tall, with flat-roofed wings extending on each side.
