= West Seattle Christian School =

Private school in Washington, United States

Coordinates: 47°33′52″N 122°23′06″W

Information
- Funding type: Private school
- Religious affiliation: Christianity
- Closed: June 16, 2006
- Grades: K-8
- Enrollment: 180 (2005-2006)

West Seattle Christian School was a private Christian school located in West Seattle, which offered preschool and K-8 instruction. In the 2005–2006 school year, preschool enrollment was 70, and regular school enrollment was 110.

== History ==
The school closed on June 16, 2006.
