= Arbor Heights, Seattle =

Neighborhood of Seattle, Washington, United States

Coordinates: 47.50955°N 122.37819°W

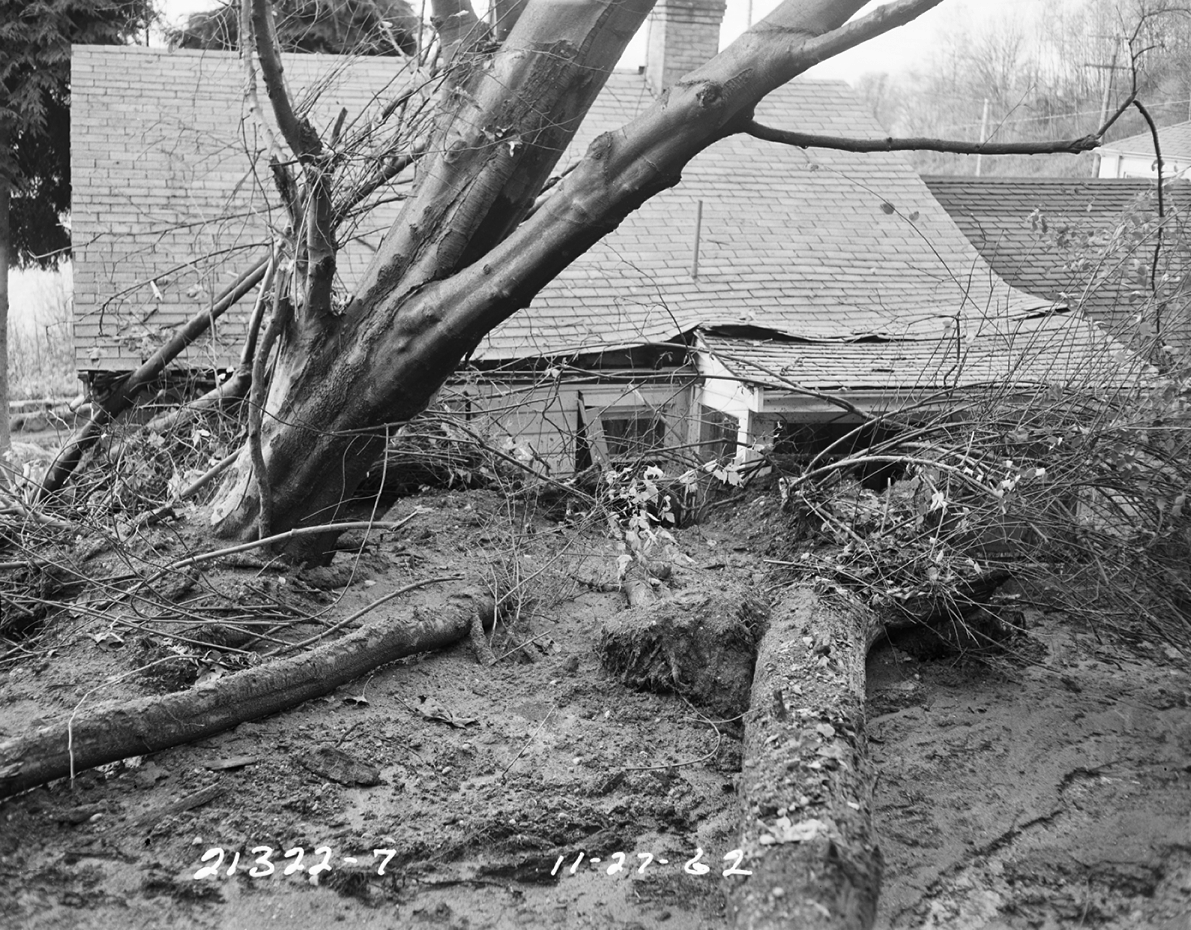
House was at 10422 47th Ave. SW

Arbor Heights is a neighborhood of West Seattle in Seattle, Washington, made up of the area south of SW Roxbury Street, north and east of Puget Sound, but excluding the downhill portion on the west side of this region. It is the southernmost section of West Seattle.

== Arbor Heights Elementary School ==
The neighborhood contains an elementary school (Arbor Heights Elementary School), demolished and rebuilt into a larger school in 2014-15 The elementary school is a K-5 school in the Seattle School District. The school's enrollment in the fall of 2021 was 535.

The school was built in 1948. The school is situated on a 4+ acres, with an extensive playground and playscape. In the fall of 2006 the playground was officially named after Jackie Keegan, longtime administrative assistant and playground supervisor at the school. Enrollment was 309 students for the 2007-08 school year. Students participate in music and physical education on an alternating daily basis. The school publishes a monthly student newspaper, distributed in hard copy and available online in pdf and podcast. date back to October, 1994, and the Newsletter bills itself as “The oldest continuously published elementary school student newspaper on the Internet”.

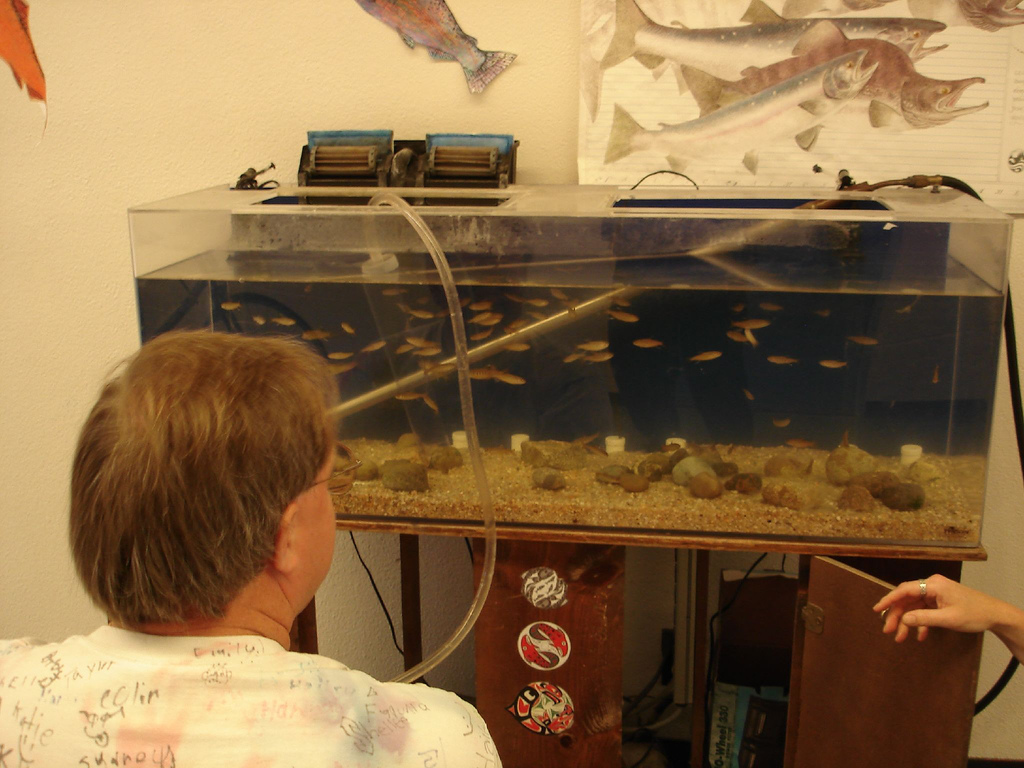
Salmon tank at Arbor Heights

Every spring the school holds a Young Authors’ Conference, where each student publishes a book. The school participates annually in a salmon release program, hatching and releasing fry in the local Fauntleroy Creek. Every year the school participates in an artist in residence program. In the spring there is an alternating science or art fair. The school has a kiln, and students regularly participate in creating clay projects. The school holds an annual carnival in the spring. All-school service learning projects have included a Kids for Cans food drive, Katrina coin drive to benefit the Humane Society, and a blanket drive for the Union Gospel Mission in Seattle.

== Other ==
There are no secondary schools. It has a private club pool, Arbor Heights Swim and Tennis Club. The neighborhood is almost exclusively zoned as residential property, with the nearest commercially zoned areas being north in the Roxhill neighborhood, and a small zone down the hill to the west in the Fauntleroy neighborhood.
