= Fremont Brewing =

American craft brewery in Seattle, Washington

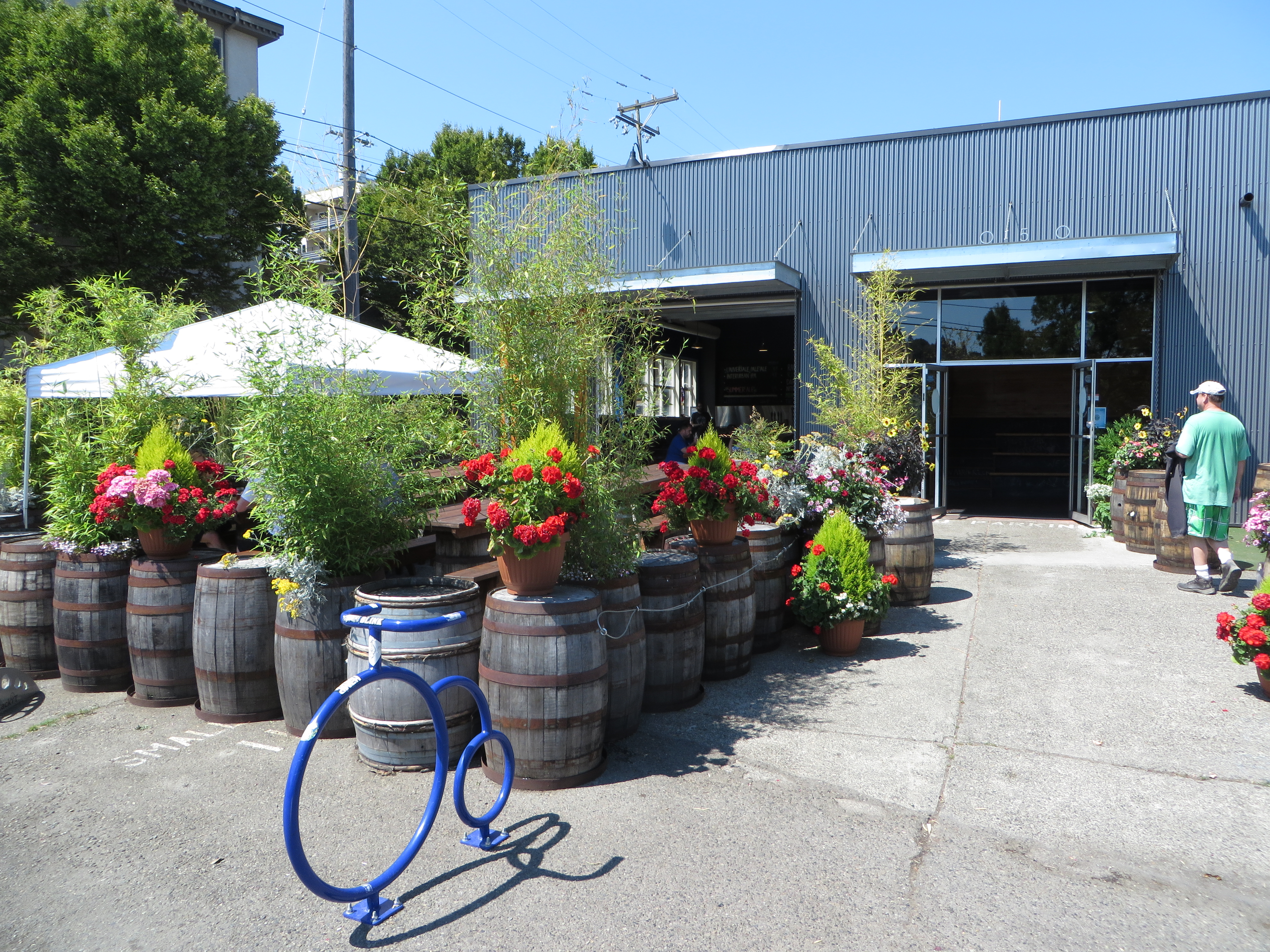
- Front of Fremont Brewing Company
- Industry: Beer
- Founded: 2009; 17 years ago
- Headquarters: Ballard, Seattle, Washington, United States
- Owner: Matt Lincecum
- Website: fremontbrewing.com

Fremont Brewing is a brewery located in the West Woodland area of the Ballard neighborhood of Seattle, Washington, United States, with a taproom and beer garden located in the Fremont neighborhood. The brewery creates small-batch artisan beers and was founded in 2009 by Sara Nelson and Matt Lincecum. The production brewery in Ballard is among the largest in the city.

Fremont Brewery is the third largest craft brewery in Washington state and the largest producer of barrel-aged beer in the state. The brewery distributes products in Washington, Oregon, Alaska, Idaho, Colorado, Montana and California.

Originally consisting of only a few tables in the brewery, the tasting room has expanded into a large beer garden with indoor and outdoor seating. In 2017, the brewery opened the Black Heron Project, which specializes in serving farmhouse and barrel-aged beers. An expanded brewing facility has opened in neighboring Ballard to meet demand. The increase to 250,000 barrels a year would put it among the top producing craft breweries in the United States.

Fremont Brewing is named after the Fremont neighborhood in Seattle. The location of the urban beer garden on N 34th St. is in the Fremont neighborhood, which extends to Stone Way.

Co-founder Sara Nelson was elected as a representative on the Brewers Association beginning February 2020 and will serve for three years.

== Beer ==
Most hops are sourced from Yakima Valley and water comes from the Cedar River watershed in the Cascade Mountains.

Popular brews include Universale Pale Ale, Interurban IPA, and Abominable Winter Ale. The Bourbon Abominable Winter Ale won a bronze at the 2012 World Beer Cup. In 2014, the Summer Ale and Bourbon Barrel Aged Dark Star Ale both won silvers at the Great American Beer Festival.

== Partnerships ==
In 2018, Alaska Airlines chose to feature Fremont Brewing's Lush IPA on flights over one hour in duration. The partnership was so successful that in 2019, Fremont created a new beer only available with Alaska Airlines entitled, Lounge Life IPA. The pair chose to partner based on their shared value of a positive environmental impact.

== Sustainability ==
Despite Fremont Brewery's size, their ranking in beer-to-water ratio compares to major brands such as Sierra Nevada and New Belgium based on their passion for sustainability. The brewery uses LED lighting, sources water from roof rain gardens, and uses only hybrid vehicles for sales. Additionally, Fremont Brewing uses a system called HORSE (high solids organic waste recycling) which takes food waste and regenerates it into renewable energy and fertilizer in 30 days.

== See also ==
- Beer in the United States
- Barrel-aged beer
