= Longfellow Creek =

Stream in Seattle, Washington

Coordinates: 47°32′52.98″N 122°21′51.63″W

Longfellow Creek is a stream in the Delridge district of West Seattle, in Seattle, Washington. It runs about 4.2 miles (6.2 km) from Roxhill Park north to the Duwamish West Waterway at Elliott Bay. The Duwamish called the creek "Smelt" (Lushootseed: tuʔawi), denoting smelt fish (Hypomesus pretiosus). The creek was a traditional fishery dating back to the 14th century.

Longfellow Creek's watershed is one of the four largest in urban Seattle, 2,685 acres (1,087 ha). It flows north from the Roxhill Park neighborhood for several miles along the valley of the Delridge neighborhoods of West Seattle, turning east to reach the Duwamish Waterway via a 3,161 ft (963 m) pipe beneath the Nucor plant (formerly Bethlehem Steel).

Salmon, absent for 60 years, began returning without intervention as soon as toxic input was ended and barriers were removed. Construction of a fish ladder at the north end of the West Seattle Golf Course will allow spawning salmon up along the fairways. Farther upstream the city has been enlarging and building more storm-detention ponds, recreation areas, and an outdoor-education center at Camp Long.

The creek headwaters are at the 10,000-year-old Roxhill Bog, south of the Westwood Village shopping center. Three acres of open upland, wetland and wooded space just east of Chief Sealth High School in Westwood is the first daylight of Longfellow Creek.

It has seen some plant and tree restoration since 1997. After more than a decade of preparation by hundreds of neighborhood volunteers many of which also participated in the daylighting of Fauntleroy Creek, restoration and a 4.2-mile (6.7-km) trail was completed in 2004. Invasive vegetation is decreasing as native species retake hold. Blue herons and coyotes can be seen.

== See also ==
- Daylighting (streams)
- Stream
- Water resources
