= Gatewood, Seattle =

- Seattle Neighborhood
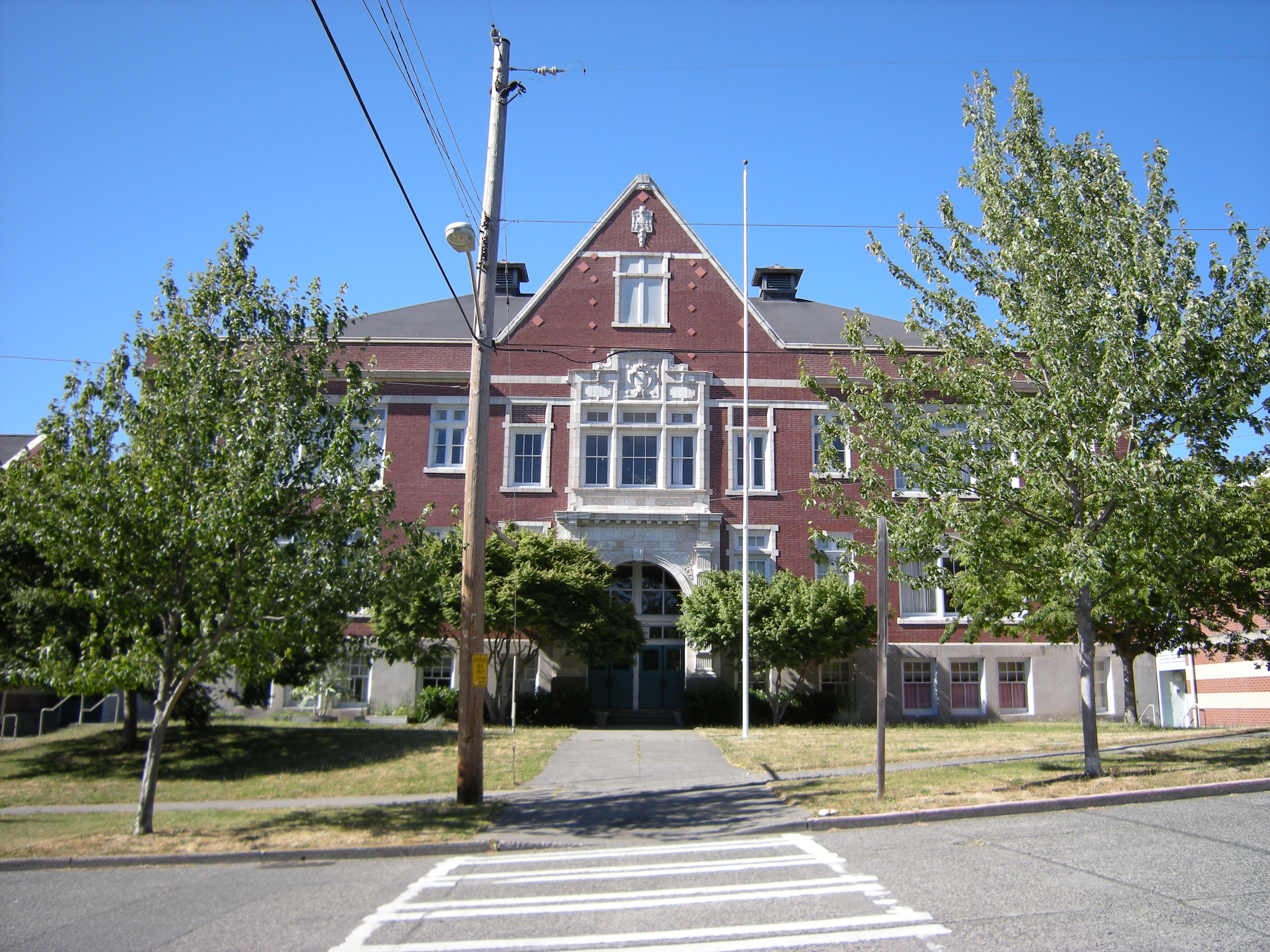
- The Gatewood School (shown here in 2008) is a Seattle city landmark.

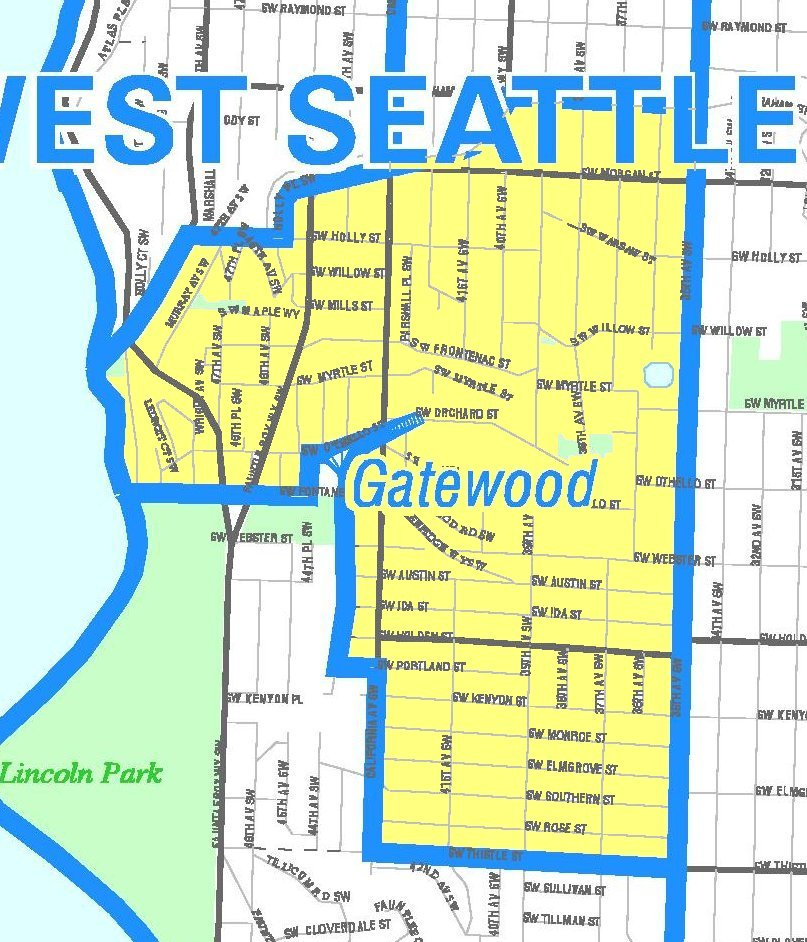
- Gatewood Highlighted in green
- Coordinates: 47°32′25″N 122°23′04″W
- Country: United States
- U.S. State: Washington
- County: King
- City: Seattle
- ZIP Code: 98136
- Area code: 206, 564

Gatewood is a neighborhood of West Seattle in Seattle, Washington. Situated on the highest hill in Seattle it overlooks Puget Sound, the Olympic Mountains, and downtown Seattle. It is generally bounded to the north and south by Raymond and Thistle Streets respectively, to the east by 35th Avenue, and the west by California Avenue and Fauntleroy Way. The neighborhood's landmarks include the Gatewood School, currently an elementary school. It is minutes from Lincoln Park.

== Schools ==
The public schools in the neighborhood are part of the Seattle Public Schools district. Gatewood Elementary is the third-oldest school in West Seattle. The original building was closed for construction in 1989, and reopened two years later.

== Demographics ==
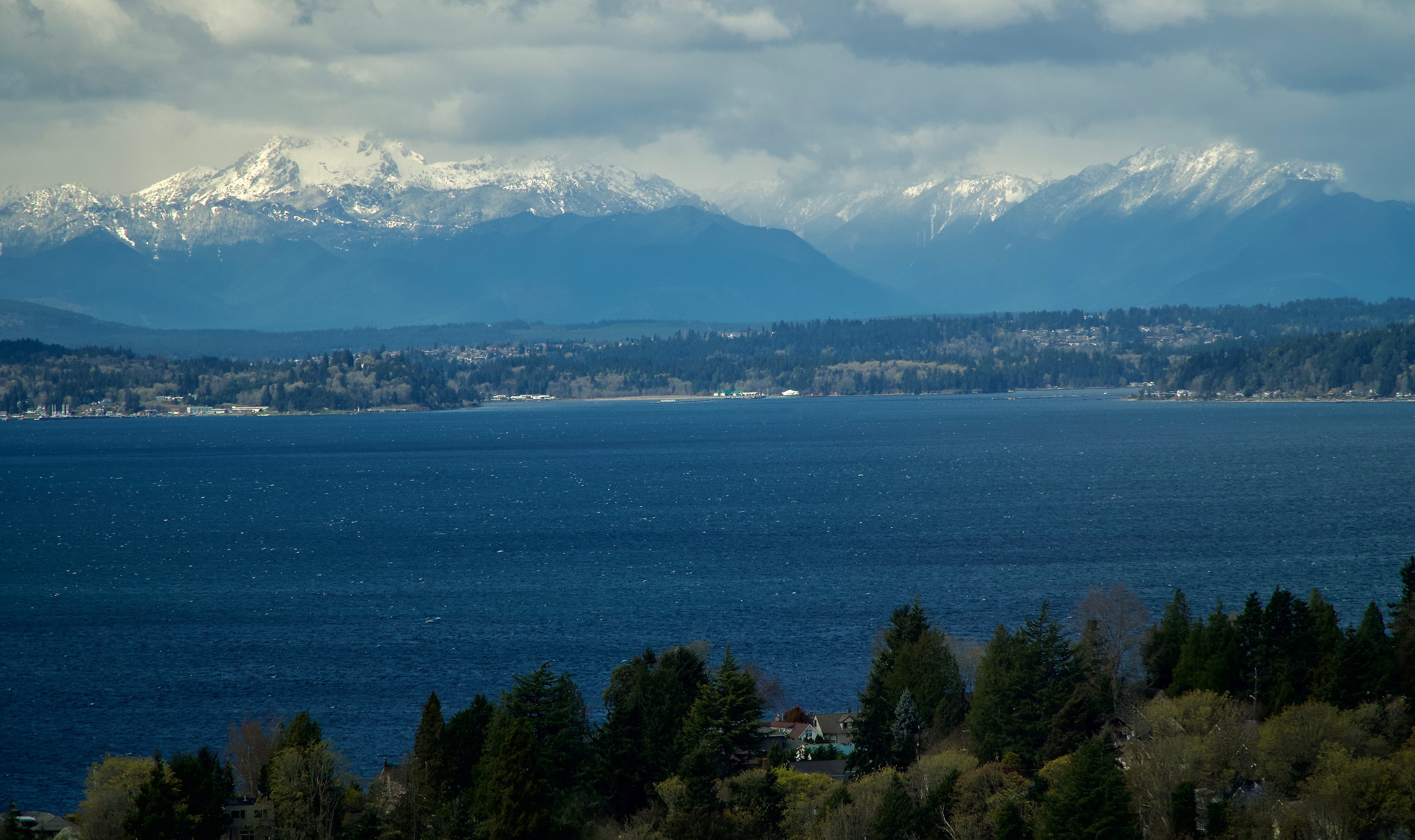
Olympic Mountains from Gatewood

As of 2008–2009, the population was 5,865 people over 1.127 square miles, with the median household income being $77,693.
