= Atlantic, Seattle =

Neighborhood of Seattle

Coordinates: 47°35′49″N 122°18′29″W

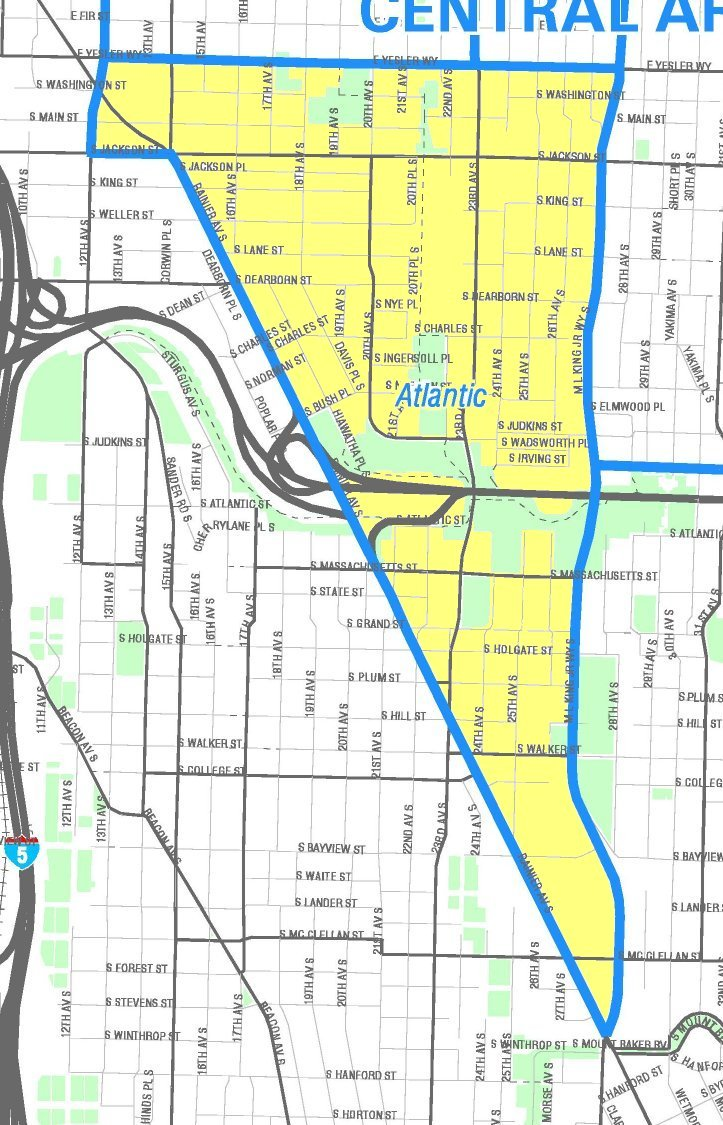
Map of the Atlantic neighborhood

Atlantic is a neighborhood in the Central District of Seattle, Washington, United States. It is the northernmost neighborhood in the Rainier Valley area, located between Mount Baker Ridge and Beacon Hill, and may also be considered part of South Seattle. It is home to the Judkins Park neighborhood.

== Atlantic ==
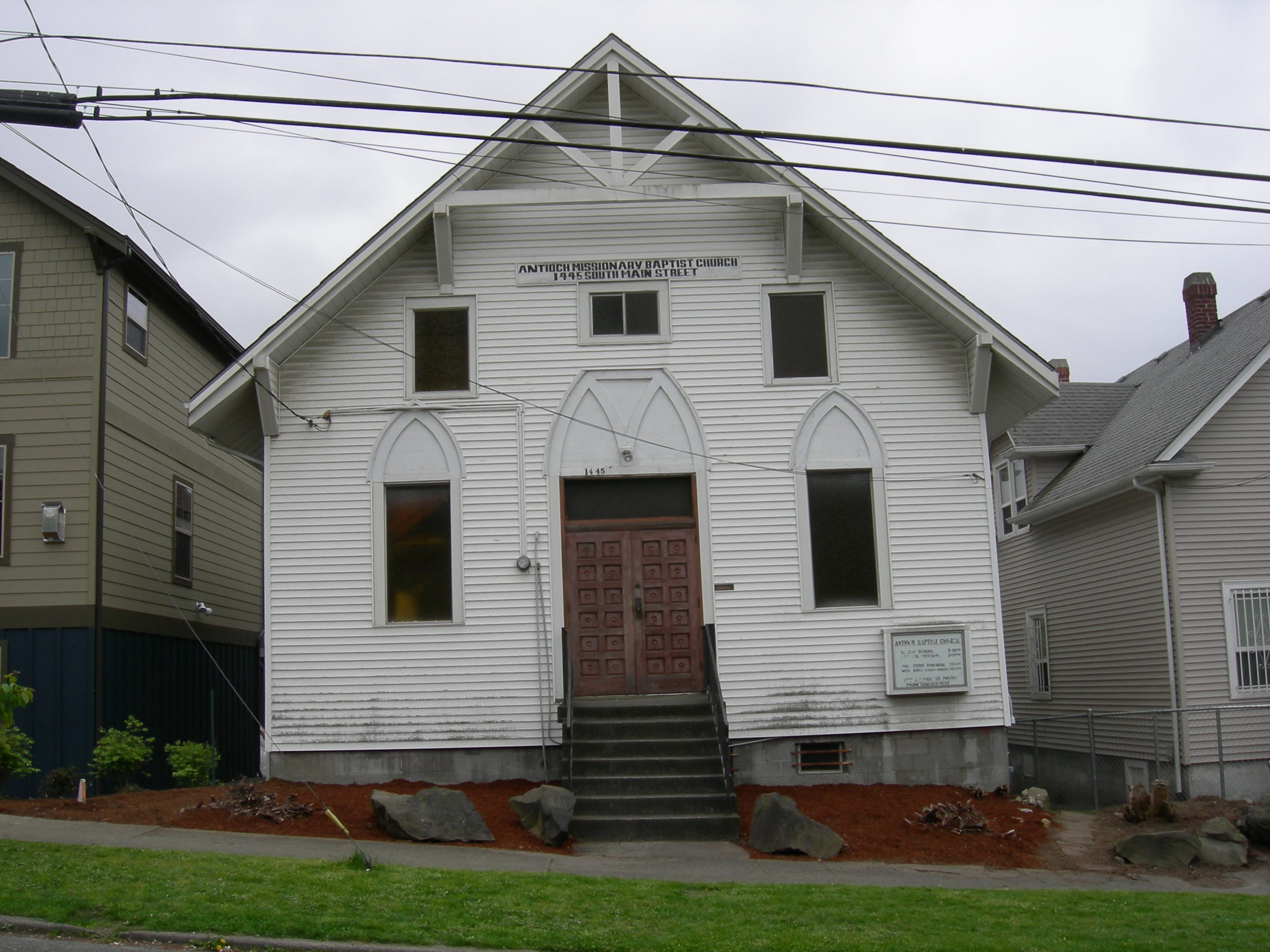
Antioch Missionary Baptist Church, 1445 S Main St

Atlantic is triangular, bounded on the north by E Yesler Way, beyond which are Mann and Minor neighborhoods; on the east by Martin Luther King, Jr. Way S, beyond which is Leschi on the Mount Baker Ridge; and on the west by Rainier Avenue S, beyond which is Yesler Terrace and the International District of Downtown Seattle as well as North Beacon Hill (with S Jackson Street and 12th Avenue S filling out a northwest corner).

== Judkins Park ==
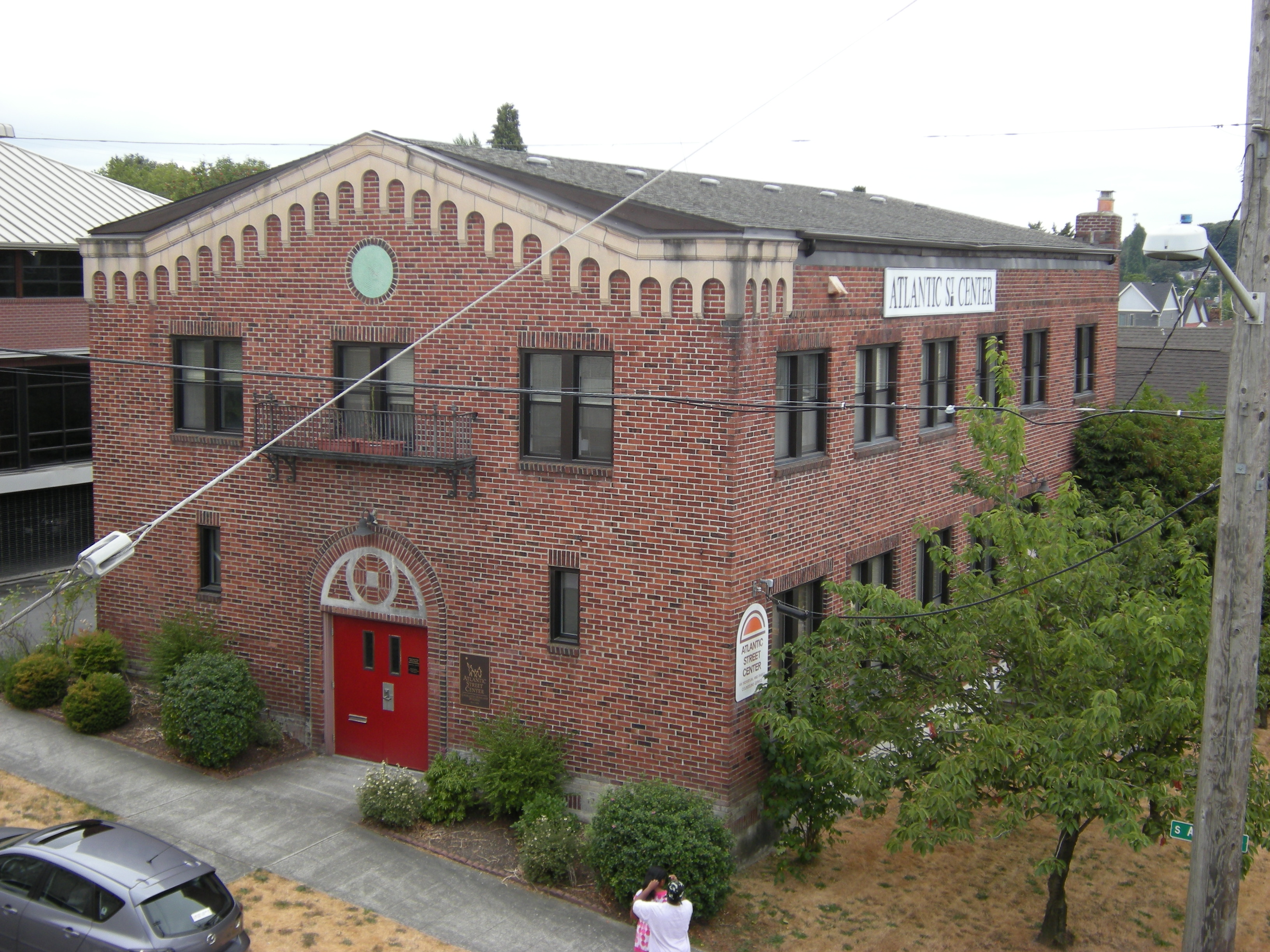
Atlantic Street Center, 2103 S. Atlantic Street. The center began in 1910 as a settlement house for Italian immigrants.

Judkins Park is rectangular within Atlantic, bounded on the south by Interstate 90, and on the west by 20th Avenue S. Judkins Park contains two baseball fields, a soccer field, a playground, and a small water park. (Like Atlantic, Judkins Park is bounded on the north by E Yesler Way, on the east by Martin Luther King, Jr. Way S.)

The neighborhood suffered greatly during the 1960s through the early 1990s with the disruptions and widenings of Interstate 90 that wiped out many homes in the area and divided the west of the neighborhood.

== Bibliography ==
- "About the Seattle City Clerk's On-line Information Services". Information Services. Seattle City Clerk's Office. April 30, 2006. Archived from the original on June 17, 2006.
  See heading, "Note about limitations of these data".
- "Atlantic". Seattle City Clerk's Neighborhood Map Atlas. June 13–17, 2002.
  Maps "NN-1120S", "NN-1130S", "NN-1140S".Jpg [sic] dated 13 June; "NN-1030S", "NN-1040S".jpg dated 17 June 2002.
  Also maps Central Area (Central District) , Downtown , and Beacon Hill .
- Judkins Foundation (February 9, 1999). "Where is Judkins Park?". Judkins Park Review. City of Seattle. Archived from the original on March 23, 2006.
- Merritt, Mike; Goldsmith, Steven (July 13, 1994). "The neighborhood that time forgot". Neighbors, History and background on Judkins Park, Neighbors project. Seattle Post-Intelligencer.
  "The Neighbors project was published weekly in the Seattle Post-Intelligencer from 1996 to 2000. This page remains available for archival purposes only and the information it contains may be outdated. For more updated information, please visit our Webtowns section."
- Wilma, David (May 22, 2000). "Residents file suit to stop Interstate 90 project on May 28, 1970". HistoryLink.org Essay 2448.
  Wilma referenced Washington Department of Transportation, "I-90: The Homestretch, July 1992", Seattle Public Library, Seattle Room; The Seattle Times, May 29, 1970, p. C-5,
