= Genesee, Seattle =

Coordinates: 47°33′53.3″N 122°23′8.3″W

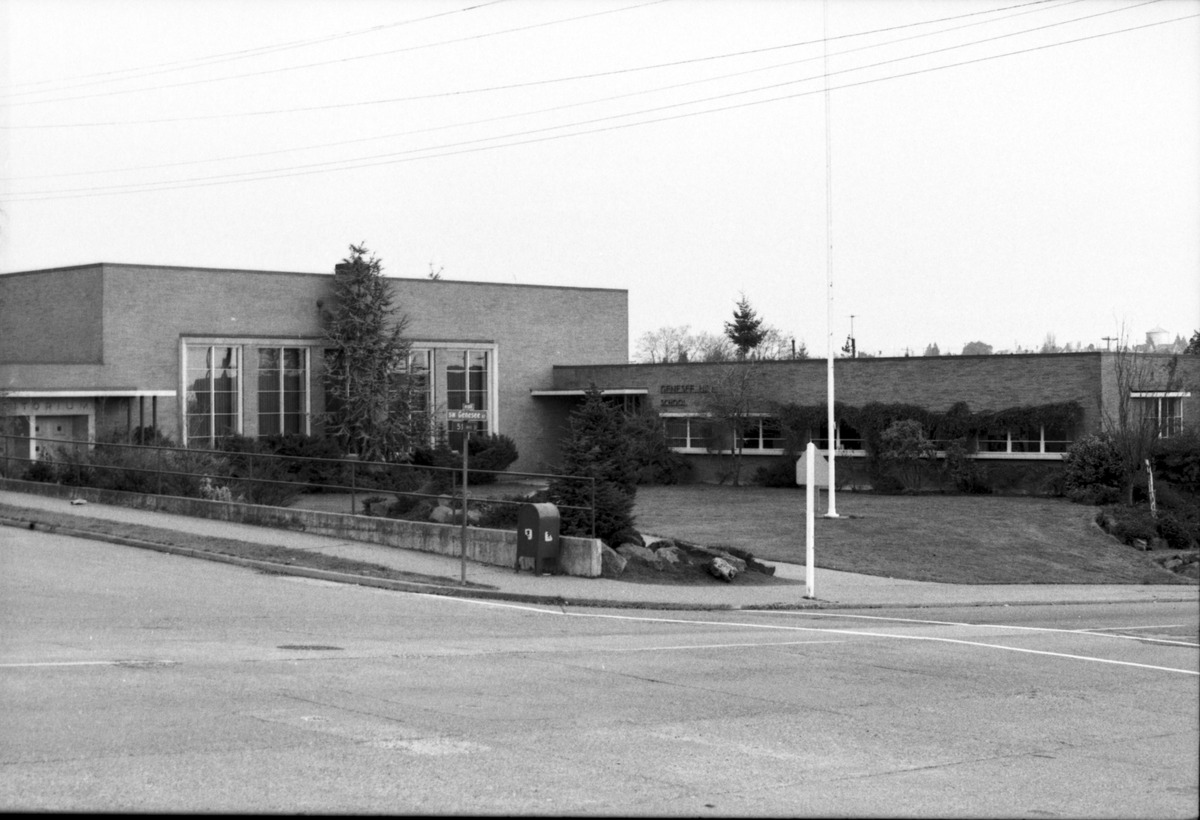
Genesee Elementary School in 1976

Genesee is a neighborhood of West Seattle in Seattle, Washington. It extends north from SW Genesee St. to SW Charlestown St., and west from 46th to 56th Avenues SW. The neighborhood includes Ercolini Park and the new Genesee Hill Elementary School. It should not be confused with Genesee Park, in Rainier Valley.
