= Seaview, Seattle =

Coordinates: 47°33′4.4″N 122°23′49.9″W

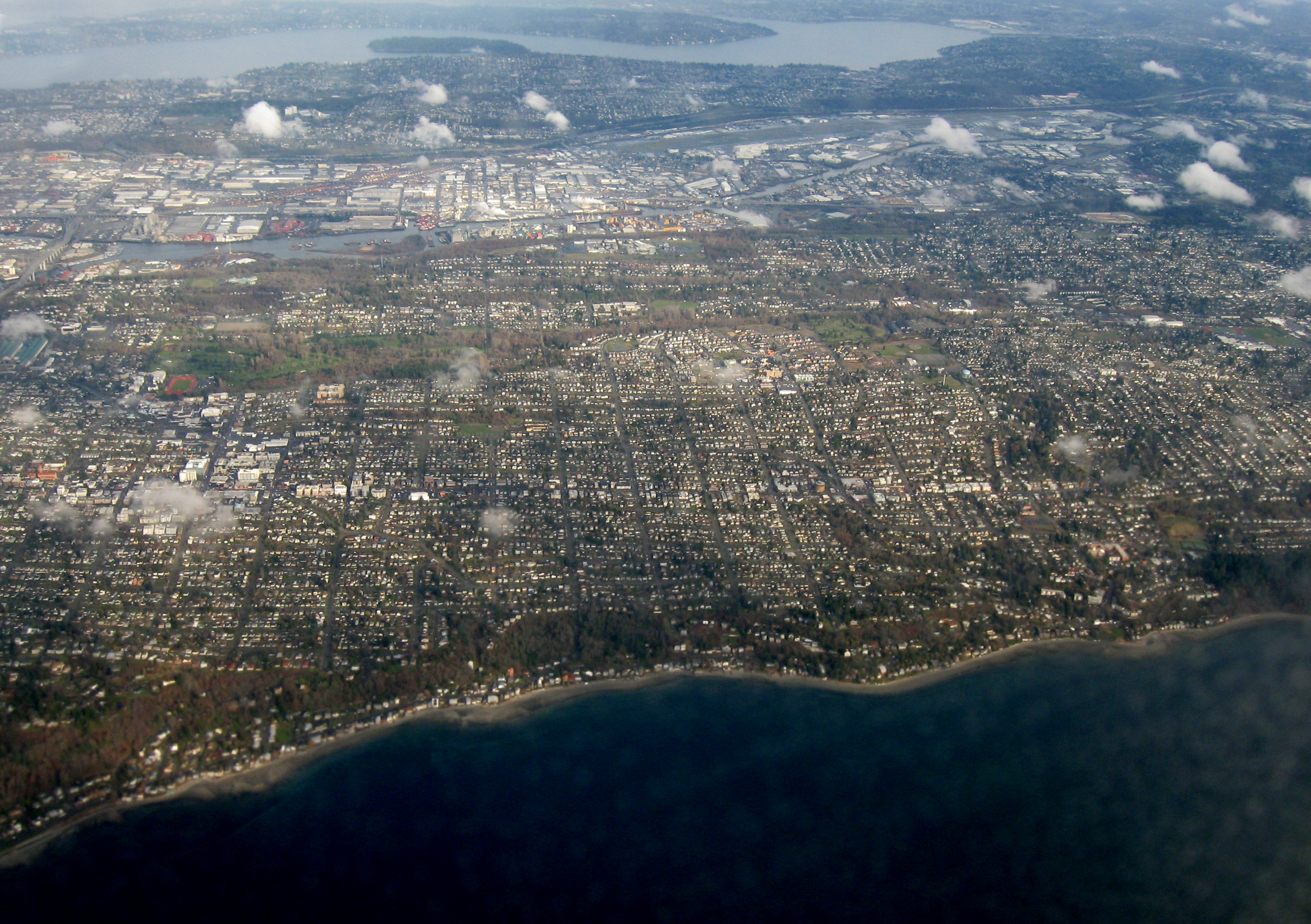
Aerial view of Seaview, looking east towards Lake Washington.

Seaview is a neighborhood in West Seattle, Washington. Seaview is bordered by Puget Sound to the west, the Alki and Genesee neighborhoods to the north, Fairmount Park to the east, and Gatewood to the south.

Seaview is also the name of a neighborhood in Edmonds, Washington.
