= West Seattle Blog =

News website in Seattle, Washington, US

- Website type: News website
- Founded: 2005
- Headquarters: Seattle, Washington, United States
- Founders: Patrick Sand and Tracy Record
- Website: www.westseattleblog.com

West Seattle Blog is a news website based in Seattle, Washington, United States. It was founded in 2005 and has a hyperlocal focus on West Seattle and its surrounding area.

== History ==
The website was founded in 2005 by husband and wife Patrick Sand and Tracy Record, a former television news director. The ad-supported website published local news, community bulletins, and other information. West Seattle Blog grew in prominence following the 2006 Hanukkah Eve windstorm and became a full-time news operation in the following year; by 2011, it had over 80,000 monthly visitors.

A sister website, White Center Now, launched in 2008 to cover the White Center area immediately south of West Seattle. West Seattle Blog was one of several neighborhood websites to partner with The Seattle Times for hyperlocal coverage in 2009.

In October 2024, West Seattle Blog co-founder Patrick Sand died. He was 67.

== See also ==
- West Seattle Herald, a former neighborhood newspaper
