= Fairmount Park, Seattle =

Neighborhood in Seattle, Washington, United States

Coordinates: 47°33′32.4″N 122°22′43.2″W

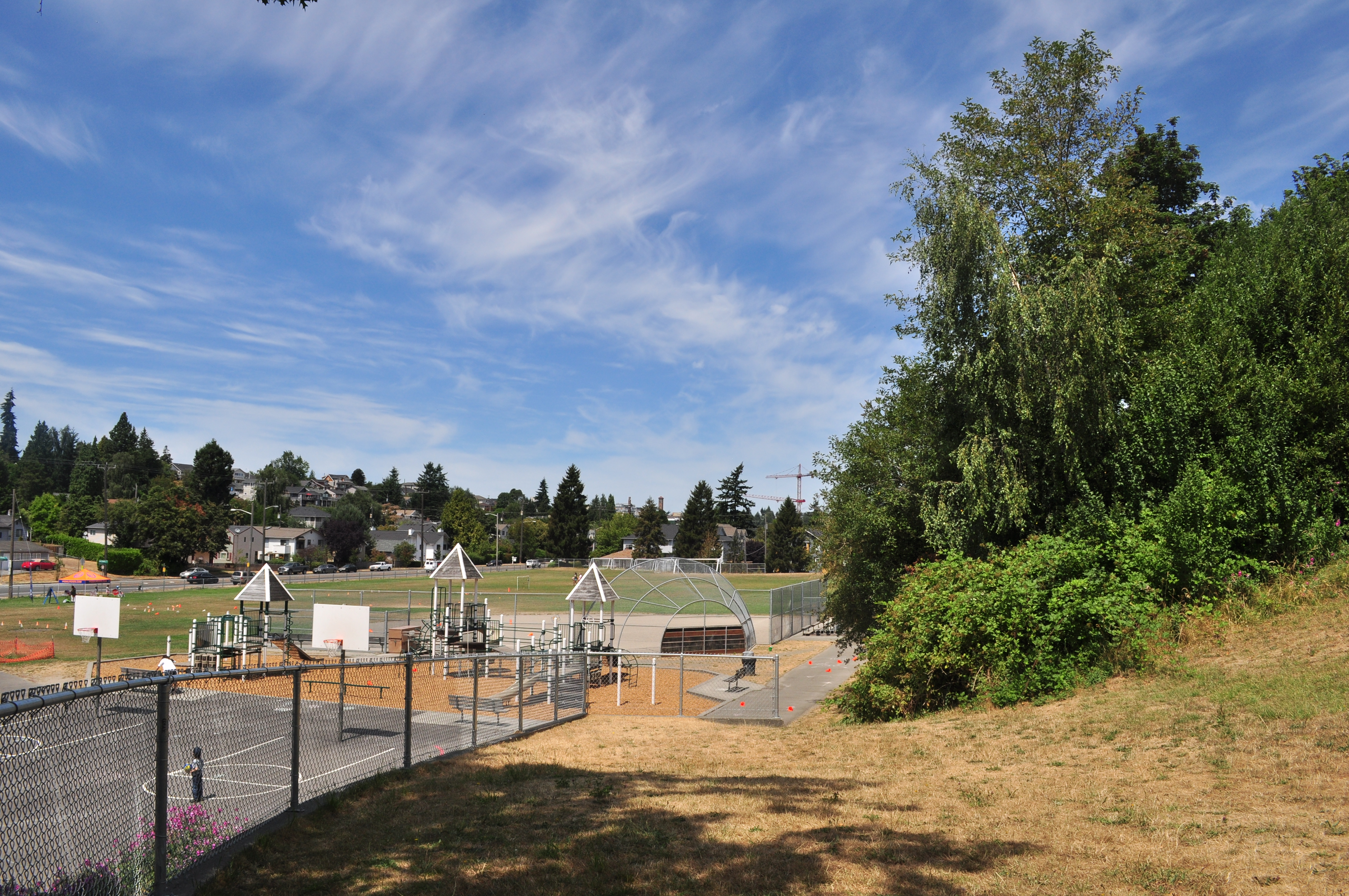
Fairmount Park playground

The Fairmount Park is a neighborhood of West Seattle in Seattle, Washington. It runs southwest along both sides of Fauntleroy Way, from SW Graham Street in the south to SW Edmunds Street in the north. Neighborhood features include Fairmount Playfield, a city park, and Fairmount Park Elementary School, part of the Seattle Public Schools system.
