= List of neighborhoods in Seattle =

The city of Seattle, Washington, contains many districts and neighborhoods. The city's former mayor Greg Nickels has described it as "a city of neighborhoods". Early European settlers established widely scattered settlements on the surrounding hills, which grew into neighborhoods and autonomous towns. Conurbations tended to grow from such towns or from unincorporated areas around trolley stops during the 19th and early 20th centuries; the city has consequently suffered from transportation and street-naming problems.

== Definition of Seattle neighborhoods ==
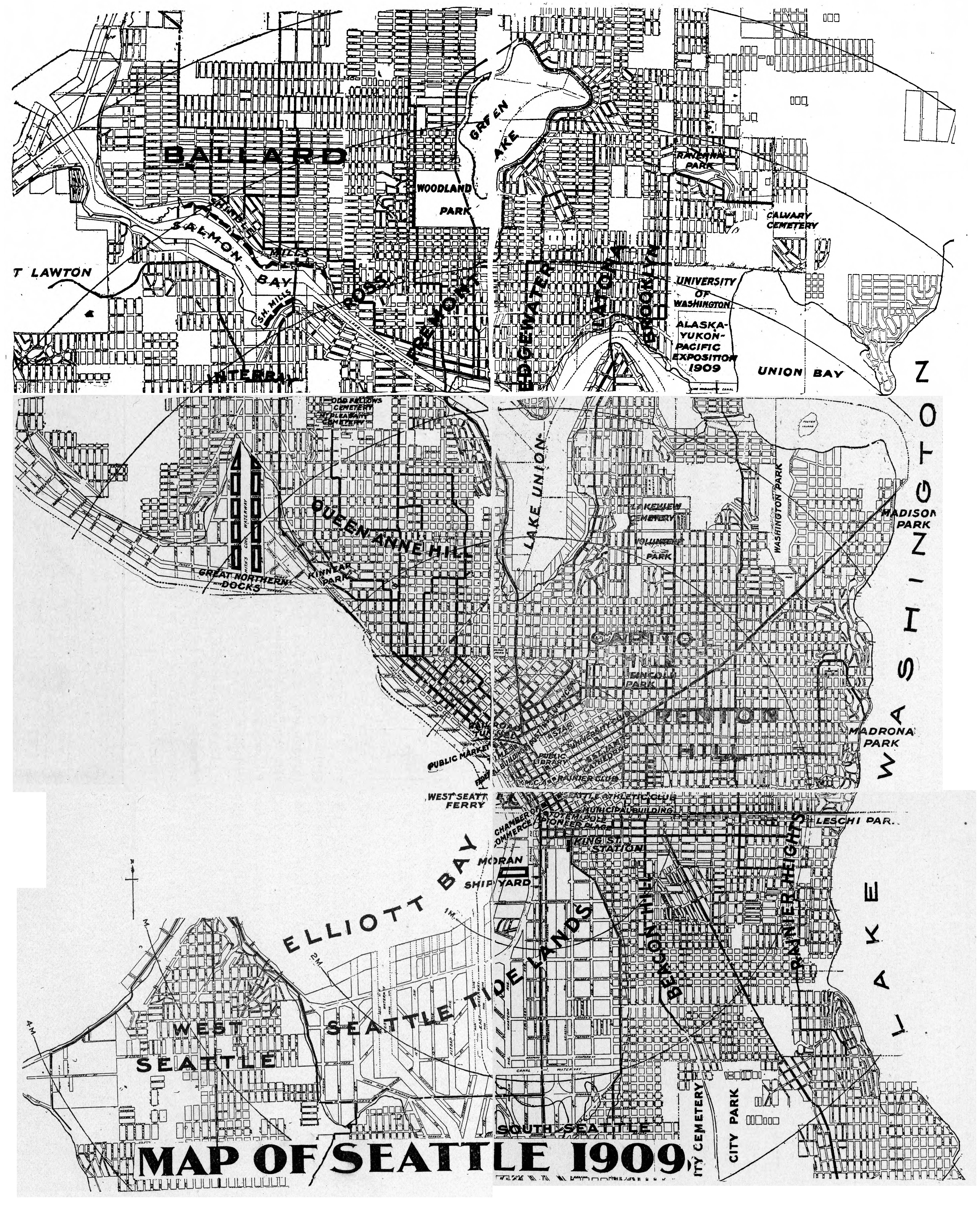
This 1909 map of Seattle shows many neighborhood names that remain in common use today—for example, Ballard, Fremont, Queen Anne Hill, Capitol Hill, West Seattle, and Beacon Hill—but also many that have fallen out of use—for example, "Ross" and "Edgewater" on either side of Fremont, "Brooklyn" for today's University District, and "Renton Hill" near the confluence of Capitol Hill, First Hill, and the Central District

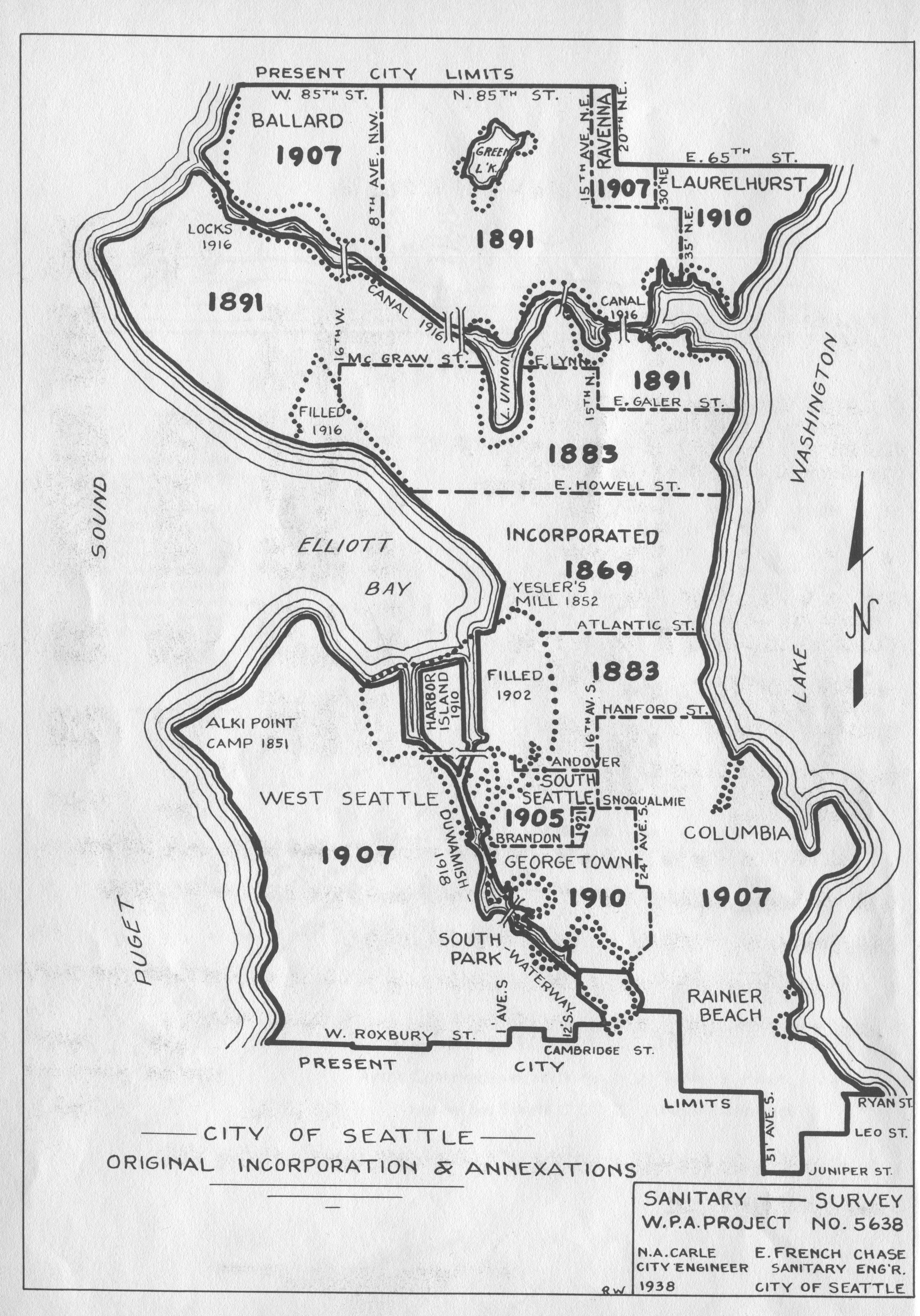
Early annexations to Seattle

Seattle was established during an economic boom fueled by the timber industry; its early years were characterized by hasty expansion and development, under which residential areas were loosely defined by widely scattered plats. This arrangement was further solidified by the establishment of locally initiated community clubs, public libraries, public schools, and public parks, which created a sense of community and civic participation. At the beginning of the 20th century, Seattle's community clubs became influential in the organization of public improvements. These had a significant effect upon the character of their neighborhoods and allowed them to remain distinct from the surrounding areas. Some community clubs used covenants to restrict the ethnicity of residents.

Establishing public library branches can define districts as well as neighborhoods. Public libraries are among the most heavily used buildings. Seattle elected its city council at large from 1910 to 2014, and community clubs lobby councilors for the interests of local residents – such as for a library branch. The community organizations build a voting constituency, and in so doing define a neighborhood. In the absence of ward politics, this and campaign finance legislation are seen as more open alternatives. The Greenwood-Phinney Commercial Club was particularly active in organizing toward the Greenwood branch that opened in 1928. The Lake City Branch Library opened in 1935 as a few shelves of books in part of a room in Lake City School, shared with the Works Progress Administration (WPA), sponsored by the Pacific Improvement Club community group. The library moved into a new building in 1955.

Elementary public schools effectively defined many neighborhoods, which are often synonymous with the name of the elementary school when the neighborhood and school were established. Many of the neighborhoods contain a few smaller neighborhoods. Mann and Minor neighborhoods in the Central District, were built around their schools. The University Heights school (1903) in the north of the University District was named for the neighborhood, as was the Latona School (1906) in Wallingford.

Parks similarly define some neighborhoods. Madrona Beach and Cowen and Ravenna Parks were privately established to encourage residential development upon otherwise unusable land. The plan for Olmsted Parks fulfilled its goal and significantly influenced the character of neighborhoods around parks and playgrounds. East Phinney and West Meridian neighborhoods are sometimes called Woodland Park, as well as South Green Lake or North Wallingford for Meridian.

== Covenants and racial restrictions ==
Housing covenants became common in the 1920s and were validated by the U.S. Supreme Court in the 1926 case Corrigan v. Buckley. Minorities were effectively limited to the International District and parts of some neighborhoods in south-east Seattle for Asian- and Native Americans; or the Central District for people of African ancestry, clearly defining those neighborhoods. Ballard – Sunset Hill, Beacon Hill, Broadmoor, Green Lake, Laurelhurst, Magnolia, Queen Anne, South Lake City, and other Seattle neighborhoods and blocks had racially or ethnically restrictive housing covenants, such as the following sample:

No person or persons of [any of several minorities] blood, lineage, or extraction shall be permitted to occupy a portion of said property ... except a domestic servant or servants who may actually and in good faith be employed by white occupants.

Further restrictions on conveyance (rental, lease, sale, transfer) were often included, effectively defining most of the neighborhoods in Seattle during the first decades after establishment.

The Supreme Court ruled in 1948 that racial restrictions would no longer be enforced. The Seattle Open Housing Ordinance became effective in 1968. Although unenforceable, legal complications prevent the covenants from being expunged from property title documents.

== Wards and Little City Halls ==
Seattle initially adopted a ward system; however, in 1910, this system was replaced by non-partisan, at-large representation. Variations on ward systems were proposed and rejected in 1914, 1926, 1974, 1995, and 2003 and convictions for campaign-related money laundering followed the 1995 campaign. Critics claimed that district-style elections of the city council would result in Tammany Hall-style politics. In 1973, inspired by Boston's model, Mayor Wes Uhlman's administration implemented a system of Little City Halls, where Community Service Centers (CSCs) assumed responsibility for coordinating municipal services. Uhlman's political opponents called the CSCs a thinly disguised ward system designed to promote Uhlman's reelection. CSCs became a setting for political arguments between the city council and the mayor; controversies over accountability, cronyism, and ward politics occurred in 1974, 1976, and 1988. In 1991 the CSCs were renamed Neighborhood Service Centers (NSCs) and were placed under the jurisdiction of the Department of Neighborhoods. More recently, their number has been reduced. As of 2011, there are NSCs located in Ballard, Lake City, the University District, the Central District, West Seattle, Southeast Seattle, and Delridge.

== Local improvement districts ==
A local improvement district (LID) is a method by which a group of property owners can share the cost of transportation infrastructure improvements. This involves improving the street, building sidewalks and installing stormwater management systems. Without Seattle's LID assessment system, the city would be unable to maintain its rapid growth in population and territory. LIDs have helped define neighborhoods by localizing decisions about issues like sidewalks, vegetation and other features of the public space, permitting neighborhoods to remain distinct from their neighbors.

== Informal districts ==
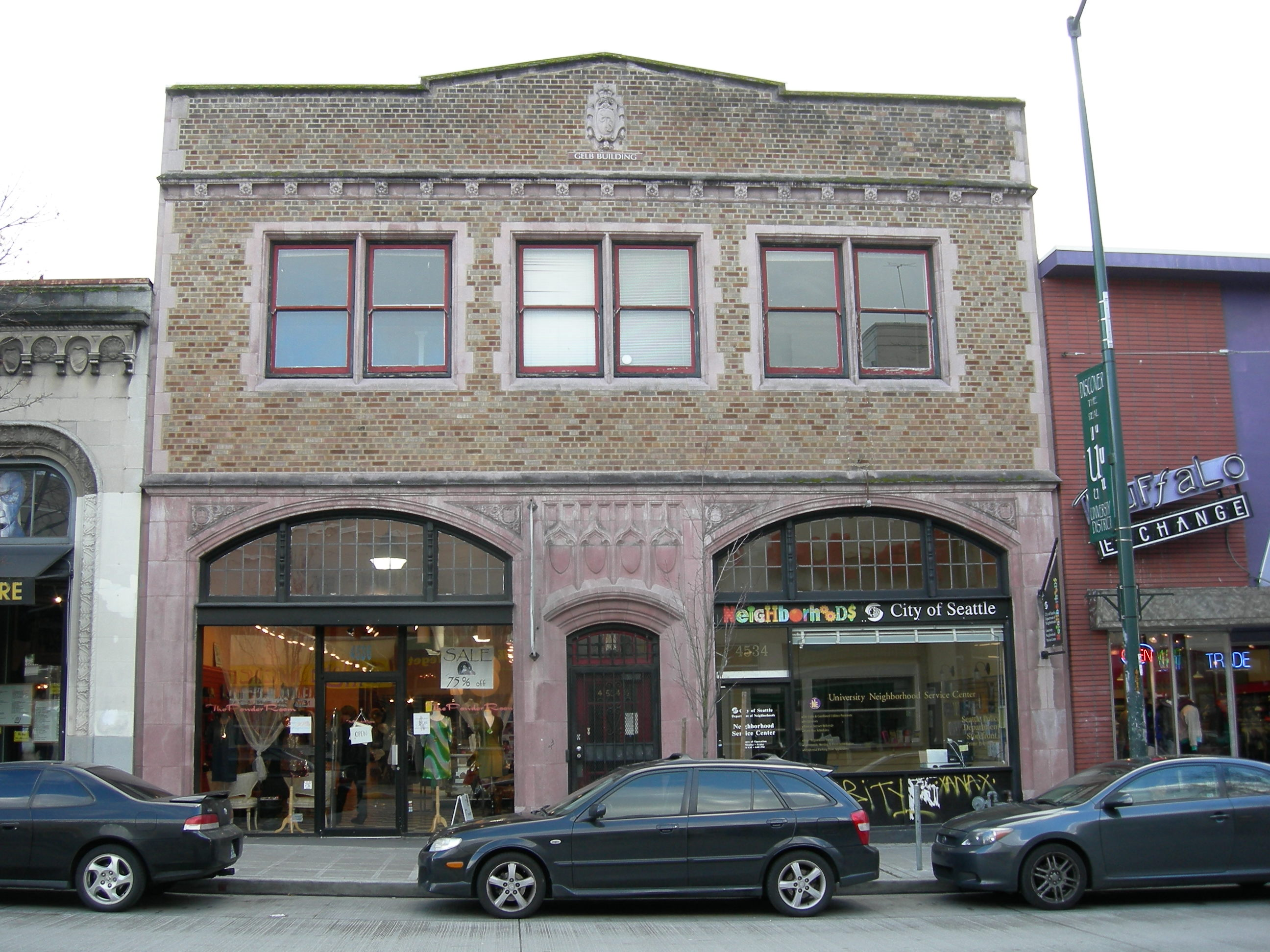
University District Neighborhood Service Center (storefront at right)

No official neighborhood boundaries have existed in Seattle since 1910. Districts and neighborhoods are thus informal; their boundaries may overlap and multiple names may exist for a single district. Boundaries and names can be disputed or change over time. In 2002 a Department of Neighborhoods spokeswoman said, "I've seen my area go from the 'CD' to 'Madrona' to 'Greater Madison Valley' and now 'Madrona Park.' " Some neighborhoods, such as northwest Seattle, do not have widely recognized names for their greater districts.

Throughout Seattle one can find signs indicating the boundaries of neighborhoods; the locations of these signs have been specified by the city's many community councils. However, the boundaries suggested by these signs routinely overlap and differ from delineations on maps. For example, signs indicate that Lake City Way NE is the southeastern boundary of the Maple Leaf neighborhood, while the city clerk's archival map places that district's southern boundary at 85th Street.

Another example of boundary ambiguity is "Frelard," which local residents call the area shared by Fremont and Ballard between 3rd and 8th Avenues NW. Signs facing opposite directions on NW Leary Way reveal the overlap.

Further difficulty in defining neighborhoods can result from residents' identification with neighborhoods different from those marked on signs and maps. After an acrimonious development dispute in 1966, a group of concerned Wallingford citizens enlisted the University of Washington Community Development Bureau to survey their neighborhood; the survey revealed that more residents of southwest Wallingford considered themselves citizens of Fremont than of Wallingford.

=== Transportation ===
Minor arterial roads are generally located along the boundaries of neighborhoods, with streets and highways built according to the street classification system. These effectively help define neighborhoods.

Development in accordance with the street classification system maintains the quality of life of city neighborhoods and improves efficiency of the road system. The classification system discourages rat running through local neighborhood streets.

Transportation hubs, such as business zones and transit stations, such as Park and Ride facilities, provide focal points for districts of neighborhoods the same way trolley stops defined neighborhoods before cars.

== Designated Historic Districts ==
The Department of Neighborhoods designates a number of Historic Districts, which have a similar status to Seattle Landmarks. As of 2021 these are:

- Ballard Avenue Landmark District
- Columbia City Landmark District
- Fort Lawton Landmark District
- Harvard-Belmont Landmark District
- International Special Review District
- Pike Place Market Historical District
- Pioneer Square Preservation District
- Sand Point Naval Air Station Landmark District

Source of list:

== List of districts and neighborhoods ==
Despite complications in Seattle's system of neighborhoods and districts, the names and boundaries in the following list are generally accepted and widely used. They are based on the Seattle City Clerk's Neighborhood Map Atlas, which in turn is based on a variety of sources, including a 1980 neighborhood map produced by the now-defunct Department of Community Development, Seattle Public Library indexes, a 1984–1986 "Neighborhood Profiles" feature series in the Seattle Post-Intelligencer, numerous park, land use and transportation planning studies, as well as records in the Seattle Municipal Archives.

The following table is largely based on maps from the Seattle City Clerk's Neighborhood Atlas, but also includes designations from other sources.

	Neighborhood name	Within larger district	Annexed	Locator map	Street map	Image	Notes
1	North Seattle	Seattle	Various				North of the Lake Washington Ship Canal
2	Broadview	North Seattle	1954				
3	Bitter Lake	North Seattle	1954				
4	North Beach / Blue Ridge	North Seattle	1940, 1954				
5	Crown Hill	North Seattle	1907, 1952, 1954				
6	Greenwood	North Seattle	1891, 1954				
7	Northgate	North Seattle	various 1891–1954				
8	Haller Lake	Northgate	1954				
9	Pinehurst	Northgate	1953				
10	North College Park (Licton Springs)	Northgate	1950, 1954				
11	Maple Leaf	Northgate	1891, 1907, 1941, 1945, 1949				
12	Lake City	North Seattle	1953, 1954				Before annexation to Seattle, Lake City was a township for 5 years. Lake City neighborhoods are now also known as Sand Point-Magnuson Park and neighborhoods northwest of Sand Point.
13	Cedar Park	Lake City	1954				
14	Matthews Beach	Lake City	1953				
15	Meadowbrook	Lake City	1953				
16	Olympic Hills	Lake City	1954				
17	Victory Heights	Lake City	1953, 1954				
18	Wedgwood	North Seattle	1945				
19	View Ridge	North Seattle	1942, 1953				
20	Sand Point	North Seattle	1910?, 1942?; 1953				
21	Roosevelt	North Seattle	1891				
22	Ravenna	North Seattle	1907, 1910, 1941, 1943, 1945				The 1907 annexation was the former town of Ravenna.
23	Bryant	North Seattle	1891				
24	Windermere	North Seattle	1910				
25	Hawthorne Hills	Windermere / North Seattle	1910				Of the area the Seattle City Clerk's Neighborhood Atlas designates as "Windermere", many consider the area west of Sand Point Way to be a separate neighborhood, Hawthorne Hills.
26	Laurelhurst	North Seattle	1910				
27	University District (U District)	North Seattle	1891				Known in the 1890s and 1900s as Brooklyn. The main campus of the University of Washington is itself divided into the main (central) campus, plus the large South Campus (south of NE Pacific Street) and East Campus (east of Montlake Boulevard NE), and a smaller North Campus (north of NE 45th Street) and miscellaneous buildings west of 15th Avenue NE that are collectively known as West Campus. Beyond the university, the district has a shopping district known as "The Ave" and older neighborhoods such as University Heights and University Park that are nowadays rarely distinguished from the U. District as such.
28	University Village	Ravenna / University District	1891, 1907, 1910				Primarily, the name 'University Village' refers to a shopping center at a corner of what the City Clerk considers part of Ravenna, but it is also commonly used for the surrounding neighborhood on all sides, which ranges into what the City Clerk's maps consider Ravenna to the north and west and the east portion of the University District to the west. (To the south is the East Campus of the University of Washington.)
29	Wallingford	North Seattle	1891				Includes historic Latona and usually Tangletown/Meridian (the latter is sometimes considered part of Green Lake)
30	Northlake	Lake Union / Lower Wallingford, spilling over into Fremont and the University District.	1891				
31	Green Lake	North Seattle	1891				Some people consider Meridian / Tangletown to be part of the Green Lake neighborhood.
32	Fremont	North Seattle	1891				
33	Phinney Ridge	North Seattle	1891				
34	Ballard	North Seattle	1907				
35	West Woodland	Ballard	1891 (East of 8th Ave NW), 1907 (West of 8th Ave NW)				
36	Whittier Heights	Ballard	1907				
37	Adams	Ballard	1907				
38	Sunset Hill	Ballard	1907				
39	Loyal Heights	Ballard	1907				
40	Central Seattle	Seattle	Various				Including everything south of the Lake Washington Ship Canal and north of Yesler Way, and some things a bit further south.
41	Magnolia	Central Seattle	1891				
42	Lawton Park	Magnolia	1891				
43	Briarcliff	Magnolia	1891				
44	Southeast Magnolia	Magnolia	1891				
45	Interbay	Central Seattle	1891				
46	Queen Anne	Central Seattle	[1869], 1883, 1891				Part of Lower Queen Anne was original 1869 Seattle; the area south of McGraw Street was annexed 1883, and the rest 1891.
47	North Queen Anne	Queen Anne	1891				
48	East Queen Anne	Queen Anne	1883, 1891				Annexed 1883 to McGraw Street, 1891 beyond
49	Lower Queen Anne	Queen Anne	[1869], 1883				Also known as 'Uptown'.
50	West Queen Anne	Queen Anne	1883, 1891				
51	Capitol Hill	Central Seattle	[1869], 1883, 1891				1869: Broadway District was part of "original Seattle"
52	Portage Bay / Roanoke	Capitol Hill	1883, 1891				Annexed 1883 to E Lynn St, 1891 for the remainder. Includes the Roanoke Park Historic District.
53	Broadway	Capitol Hill	[1869]				The Seattle City Clerk's Neighborhood Atlas map of the Broadway District shown here extends farther to the east and west than most present-day Seattleites would call Broadway. It appears to correspond roughly the portion of Capitol Hill that falls within the original 1869 city limits, and which was known as Broadway before the name Capitol Hill was introduced.
54	Pike-Pine Corridor / Pike/Pine	Capitol Hill / Broadway	[1869]				The Pike-Pine Corridor, running east-west through what the Seattle City Clerk's Neighborhood Atlas considers the "Broadway" District, has gained a strong identity in the early 21st century.
55	Montlake	Capitol Hill / Central Seattle	1891, 1950, 1952, 1953 (?)				The Seattle City Clerk's Neighborhood Atlas classifies Montlake as part of Capitol Hill, but a valley along Boyer Avenue separates it from the hill.
56	Stevens	Capitol Hill					The name "Stevens" does not have much currency for most of this area except for the immediate vicinity of the Stevens School at 19th Avenue E and E Galer Street. The small neighborhood just north of that is often called Interlaken, after Interlaken Park; the area centered around 19th Avenue and E Madison Street was known in the early 20th century as Renton Hill, but that name has largely passed out of use.
57	Interlaken	Capitol Hill / Stevens					Consisting largely of Interlaken Park and Louisa Boren Park, the neighborhood between Capitol Hill proper and Montlake also contains a small number of private homes and the Seattle Hebrew Academy.
58	Madison Valley	Capitol Hill / Stevens / Central Seattle	1883, 1891				Annexed 1883 south of E Galer Street, 1891 for the remainder
59	Renton Hill	Capitol Hill / Stevens					Although the name has largely fallen out of use, the Renton Hill Community Improvement Club, founded June 18, 1901, was Seattle's first community club.
60	Madison Park	Capitol Hill / Central Seattle	1883, 1891				Annexed 1883 south of E Galer St; the remainder in 1891. The Seattle City Clerk's Neighborhood Atlas classifies Madison Park as part of Capitol Hill, but a valley through the Washington Park Arboretum separates it from Capitol Hill proper.
61	Broadmoor	Madison Park	1883, 1891				Annexed 1883 south of the line of E Galer St; the remainder in 1891. A gated community within Madison Park.
62	Lake Union	North Seattle / Central Seattle					The City Clerk's Neighborhood Atlas uses the term "Cascade" to refer to much of the area around Lake Union (see map here), but that use is not at all common.
63	South Lake Union, Seattle	Lake Union	1883				The City Clerk's Neighborhood Atlas uses the term "Cascade" to refer to much of the area around Lake Union (see image here), but that use is not at all common.
64	Cascade, Seattle	South Lake Union	1883				Cascade, south and east of Lake Union originally extended west to Terry Avenue (though it is now generally considered to end at Fairview, south to Denny Hill (now the Denny Regrade) east to Melrose Avenue E (from which it is through the area now cut off by Interstate 5.
65	Westlake	Lake Union	1883				
66	Eastlake	Lake Union	1883, 1891				
67	Downtown	Central Seattle	[1869]				
68	Denny Triangle	Downtown	[1869]				
69	Belltown	Downtown	[1869]				Belltown currently is largely residential with some commercial office buildings, with 1st street containing a large concentration of nightlife dining and drinking establishments. The intersection of 2nd ave and Virginia is the highest point in the Downtown neighborhood area.
70	Pike-Market	Downtown	[1869]				
71	Central Business District	Downtown	[1869]				
72	First Hill	Downtown	[1869]				Widely known as "Pill Hill" for its many hospitals, this neighborhood immediately east of Downtown was once the city's most desirable residential area.
73	Pioneer Square	Downtown	[1869]				The original center of Seattle, the southwest part of present-day Downtown. Probable origin of the term "Skid Road" for a neighborhood. Includes the Pioneer Square-Skid Road Historic District. Pioneer Square as defined by the City Clerk's Neighborhood Atlas also includes the tide lands platted 1895, filled 1902, that are now the site of two professional sports stadiums.
74	International District ("ID")	Downtown	[1869]				Includes former tide lands platted 1895, filled 1902. Southeast Downtown. Sometimes referred to as "Chinatown", the neighborhood also includes Little Saigon east of Interstate 5, and remnants of the historic Japantown, especially around 6th Avenue and Main Street.
75	Yesler Terrace	Downtown	[1869]				Housing project east of Interstate 5; originally, it extended further west into present-day Kobe Terrace Park.
76	Central Waterfront	Downtown	[1869]				
77	West Edge	Downtown	[1869]				The downtown area of both the Central Business District and Belltown from roughly halfway between First and Second Avenues to Alaskan Way (but not including the piers themselves) is sometimes called the Seattle's "West Edge".
78	Central Area / Central District ("CD")	Central Seattle	[1869], 1883				
79	Mann	Central Area	[1869]				The name Mann for this area around Garfield High School does not have much currency. It comes from the old Horace Mann School, later Nova, just north of Garfield.
80	Minor	Central Area	[1869]				The name Minor for this area does not have much currency. It comes from the T.T. Minor School.
81	Cherry Hill & Squire Park	Minor	[1869], 1905, 1921				Portions are part of original Seattle; Squire Park was annexed in 1905, and a remaining enclave in 1921.
82	Atlantic	Central Area	[1869], 1883				The northern portion of this area was part of original 1869 Seattle; south of Atlantic Street was annexed 1883
83	Judkins Park	Atlantic	[1869]				
84	Madrona	Central Area	[1869], 1883				South of E Howell Street was original 1869 Seattle; the remainder was annexed 1883.
85	Madrona Valley	Madrona	[1869]				
86	Harrison / Denny-Blaine	Central Area	1883				
87	Washington Park	Harrison/Denny-Blaine	1883				
88	Leschi	Central Area	[1869]				
89	South End	Seattle	various				
90	Rainier Valley	South End	[1869], 1883, 1907				North of Atlantic Street was original 1869 Seattle; in 1883, south to Hanford Street was annexed, and the rest in 1907
91	Mount Baker	Rainier Valley	[1869], 1883, 1907				North of Atlantic Street was original 1869 Seattle; in 1883, south to Hanford Street was annexed, and the rest in 1907
92	Columbia City	Rainier Valley	1907				A town for 15 years before it was annexed.
93	Hillman City	Rainier Valley / Columbia City	1907				South of Columbia City proper,
94	Brighton	Rainier Valley	1907				The lakeshore next to this neighborhood was once called Brighton Beach, but has since been subsumed into Seward Park in common parlance and according to the Seattle City Clerk's Neighborhood Map Atlas
95	Dunlap / Othello	Rainier Valley	1907				
96	Rainier Beach / Atlantic City Beach	Rainier Valley	1907				
97	Rainier View / Lakeridge	Rainier Valley	1907				
98	Seward Park	South End	1907				
99	Lakewood	Seward Park					The northern part of the Seward Park neighborhood is sometimes referred to as "Lakewood"; the entire neighborhood also sometimes referred to as "Lakewood/Seward Park". The historic Lakewood Community Club is now called the Lakewood/Seward Park Community Club.
100	Beacon Hill	South End	[1869], 1875, 1883, 1886, 1907				
101	North Beacon Hill	Beacon Hill	[1869], 1875, 1883, 1886, 1907				
102	Mid Beacon Hill (Maplewood)	Beacon Hill	1907				
103	Holly Park / NewHolly	Beacon Hill	1907				Formerly the Holly Park housing project, now officially NewHolly.
104	South Beacon Hill / Van Asselt	Beacon Hill	1907				
105	Industrial District	South End	various 1895–1910				Tide lands west of Beacon Hill platted 1895, filled 1902. Other portions annexed 1907 along with West Seattle, Southeast Seattle, and South Park; 1910 with Georgetown.
106	SoDo	Industrial District	1895/1902				Tide lands west of Beacon Hill platted 1895, filled 1902.
107	Harbor Island	Industrial District	1910				
108	Georgetown	South End	1910				A city for 6 years before being annexed in 1910.
109	South Park	South End	1907				A town for 5 years before being annexed in 1907.
110	West Seattle	Seattle	1895/1902, 1907, 1950, 1954, 1956				Tide lands platted 1895, filled 1902 (although the Seattle City Clerk's Neighborhood Atlas places even the tidelands on the west side of the Duwamish in the Industrial District rather than West Seattle). West Seattle (including portions of Delridge) was a town for 5 years before being annexed in 1907. Some additional annexations 1950, 1954, and 1956, mainly in Arbor Heights.
111	Alki Point	West Seattle	1907				
112	North Admiral / Admiral District	West Seattle	1907				
113	West Seattle Junction / Alaska Junction	West Seattle	1907				Overlaps Genesee.
114	Seaview / Mee-Kwa-Mooks	West Seattle	1907				
115	Fairmount Park	West Seattle	1907				
116	Genesee	West Seattle	1907				Overlaps Junction.
117	Gatewood	West Seattle	1907				
118	Fauntleroy	West Seattle	1907				
119	Arbor Heights	West Seattle	1907, 1954, 1956				
120	Delridge	West Seattle / South End	1907, 1946, 1949				Most of Delridge was part of the city of West Seattle, annexed 1907; the remainder was annexed in 1946 and 1949.
121	North Delridge	Delridge	1907				
122	Pigeon Point	Delridge	1907				The extreme northeast portion of Delridge, east of Delridge Way and north of Puget Park.
123	Riverview	Delridge	1907				
124	Highland Park	Delridge	1907				
125	South Delridge	Delridge	1907, 1946, 1949				
126	Roxhill	Delridge	1907				
127	High Point	Delridge	1907				

== Annexations ==
Seattle annexed eight municipalities between 1905 and 1910, nearly doubling the area size of the city. Annexations by law were begun by the annexee and had to be approved by the Seattle City Council. The appeal of the inexpensive and accessible electric power and water system services of the public utilities were the primary motivations for the annexation movements.

Ballard was its own incorporated town for 17 years, annexed as its own ward. West Seattle incorporated in 1902, then annexed Spring Hill, Riverside, Alki Point, and Youngstown districts. It was the largest of the incorporated towns to be annexed. Southeast Seattle merged the towns of Hillman City and York with other Rainier Valley neighborhoods, then incorporated for the only reason of being annexed. Similarly, the town of South Seattle consisted of mostly industrial Duwamish Valley neighborhoods (except Georgetown); one enclave adjacent to Georgetown omitted at this time was annexed 1921; some land near the river in this area remains part of unincorporated King County. In 1910 Georgetown was the last of this sequence of small incorporated cities and towns to be annexed to Seattle before the 1954 annexation of Lake City.

The following previously incorporated cities and towns were annexed by Seattle. This list is in order of annexation. Other areas annexed to Seattle, were unincorporated before annexation. Examples of the latter include the northern part of Queen Anne Hill, the University District, and the northern area of the city that were once part of then-unincorporated Shoreline.

- Town of South Seattle, incorporated 1905, annexed 20 October 1905.
- City of Columbia (Columbia City), incorporated 1892, annexed 3 May 1907
- Town of Ravenna, incorporated 1906, annexed 15 January 1907
- Southeast Seattle—Hillman City, York, and other Rainier Valley neighborhoods except Columbia City—incorporated July 1906, annexed 7 January 1907
- Town of South Park, incorporated 1902, annexed 3 May 1907.
- City of Ballard, incorporated January 1890, annexed 29 May 1907
- City of West Seattle, incorporated April 1902, annexed 24 July 1907
- City of Georgetown, incorporated 1904, annexed 4 April 1910
- Lake City, incorporated township 1949, annexed January 1954

=== Future ===
Because of the cost of providing city services, low-density residential neighborhoods represent a net revenue loss for municipalities. Because vehicle-license revenue is no longer used to subsidize unincorporated areas, these neighborhoods have become increasingly orphaned.

In April 2004, the City Council voted to defer a decision on Mayor Nickels' proposal to designate the West Hill and North Highline neighborhoods, part of unincorporated King County, as potential annexation areas (PAAs) for at least a year. Because of the tax revolt that took place in Washington in the late 1990s and early 21st century, the county's budget has been reduced and the county has said it is unlikely to be able to maintain adequate levels of funding for urban services in unincorporated areas. The nearby city of Burien, however, issued a 2004 draft report for its own annexation of all or part of North Highline.

North Highline, which adjoins SeaTac, Burien, and Tukwila in addition to Seattle, consists of the Boulevard Park neighborhood and part of White Center. West Hill, which abuts Tukwila and Renton as well as Seattle, consists of Bryn Mawr-Skyway, Lakeridge, and Earlington. Its 2010 population is 15,645.

On December 11, 2006, the Seattle City Council agreed to designate North Highline a "potential annexation area".

== See also ==
- Street layout of Seattle about transportation and street naming
- 110th Cascades SEA Street regarding a structure helping define a neighborhood

== Bibliography ==
- "About the Seattle City Clerk's Online Information Services". Information Services. Seattle City Clerk's Office. April 30, 2006.
  See heading, "Note about limitations of these data".
- "Ballard". Seattle City Clerk's Neighborhood Map Atlas. June 13–17, 2002.
  Maps "NN-1120S", "NN-1130S", "NN-1140S".Jpg [sic] dated 13 June; "NN-1030S", "NN-1040S".jpg dated 17 June 2002.
- "Downtown". Seattle City Clerk's Neighborhood Map Atlas. June 13–17, 2002.
  Maps "NN-1120S", "NN-1130S", "NN-1140S".Jpg [sic] dated 13 June; "NN-1030S", "NN-1040S".jpg dated 17 June 2002.
- "Map home". Seattle City Clerk's Neighborhood Map Atlas. June 13–17, 2002.
  Full city map, not titled.
  Maps "NN-1120S", "NN-1130S", "NN-1140S".Jpg [sic] dated 13 June; "NN-1030S", "NN-1040S".jpg dated 17 June 2002.
- "Lake City". Seattle City Clerk's Neighborhood Map Atlas. Office of the Seattle City Clerk. June 17, 2002.
- "Neighborhood Resources". Department of Neighborhoods. City of Seattle. 2005. Archived from the original on February 23, 2006.
- "List of Neighborhoods". Seattle City Clerk's Neighborhood Map Atlas.
  Hierarchical list of neighborhoods by districts, largely in geographical order from north to south.
- "Northgate". Seattle City Clerk's Neighborhood Map Atlas. Office of the Seattle City Clerk. June 17, 2002.
- "PDF Note". Principal, Minor and Collector arterials. Seattle Department of Transportation. 2005. Archived from the original on June 14, 2006.
- Phelps, Myra L. (1978). Public works in Seattle. Seattle: Seattle Engineering Department. ISBN 0-9601928-1-6.
- "Seattle Interactive Map". Seattle Neighborhoods. HistoryLink.org. Archived from the original on February 24, 2006.
- "Rainier Valley, map". Seattle City Clerk's Neighborhood Map Atlas. Office of the Seattle City Clerk. June 13–17, 2002.
  Maps "NN-1030S", "NN-1040S".jpg 17 June 2002, maps "NN-1120S", "NN-1130S", "NN-1140S".Jpg [sic] 13 June.
- Shenk, Carol; Pollack, Laurie; Dornfeld, Ernie; Frantilla, Anne; Neman, Chris (June 26, 2002). "About neighborhood maps". Seattle City Clerk's Office Neighborhood Map Atlas. Information Services, Seattle City Clerk's Office.
  Sources for this atlas and the neighborhood names used in it include a 1980 neighborhood map produced by the Department of Community Development (relocated to the Department of Neighborhoods and other agencies), Seattle Public Library indexes (Special Collections, Seattle Collection in the Seattle Room), a 1984-1986 Neighborhood Profiles feature series in the Seattle Post-Intelligencer, numerous parks, land use and transportation planning studies, and records in the Seattle Municipal Archives.
  [Maps "NN-1120S", "NN-1130S", "NN-1140S".Jpg [sic] dated 13 June 2002; "NN-1030S", "NN-1040S".jpg dated 17 June 2002.]
  "The Neighbors project was published weekly in the Seattle Post-Intelligencer from 1996 to 2000. The page remained available for archival purposes for some years after being superseded by the P-I's Webtowns section.
- Wilma, David (July 18, 2001). "Seattle Neighborhoods: Lake City -- Thumbnail History". HistoryLink.org Essay 3449.
- "Webtowns". Seattle Post-Intelligencer.
