= Broadway District, Seattle =

Coordinates: 47°37′35.74″N 122°19′19.32″W

Broadway District
- Neighbourhood
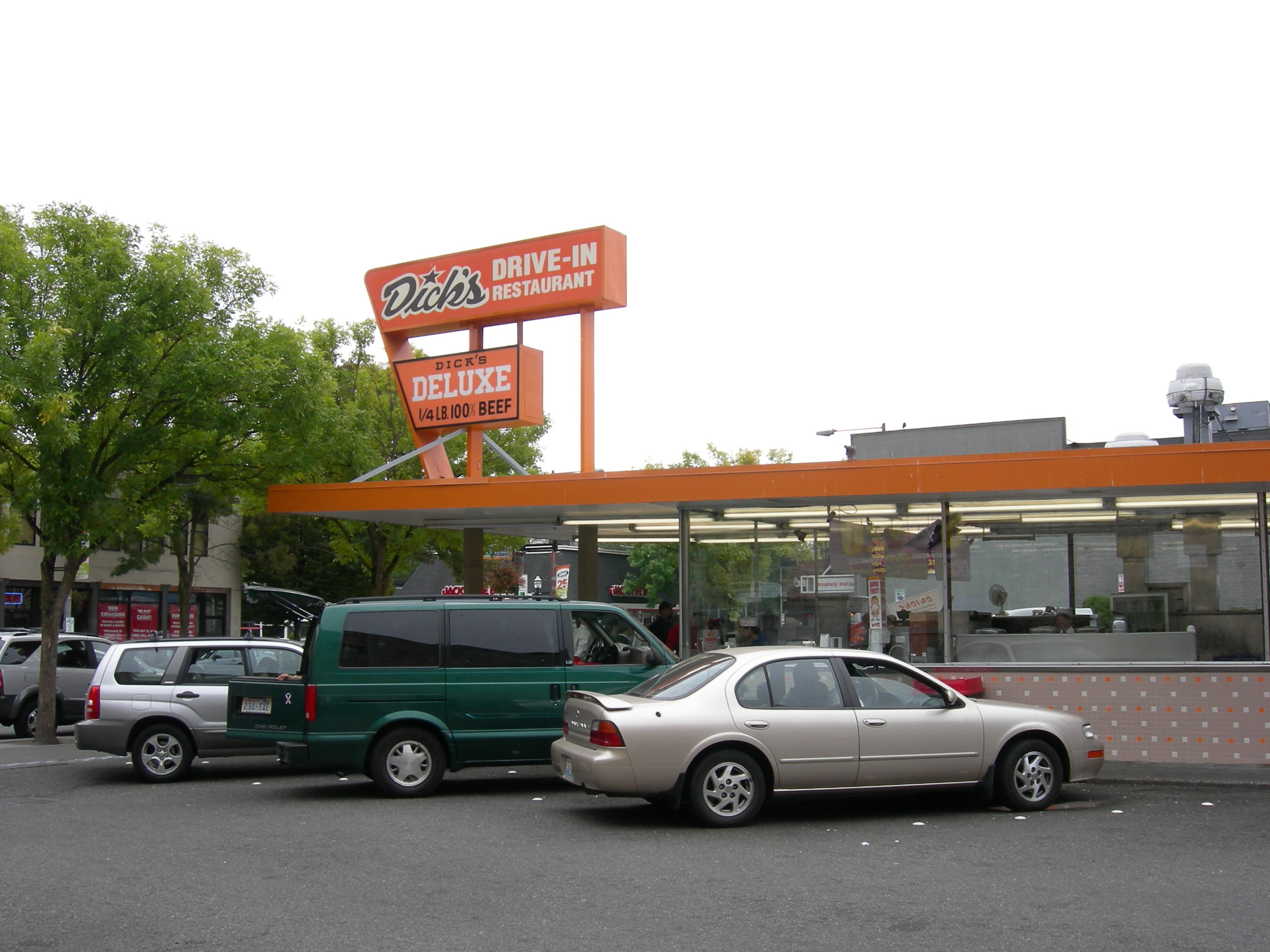
- Dick's Drive-In in the Broadway District
- Interactive map of Broadway District
- Country: United States

Broadway District is a neighborhood in Seattle, Washington. The city's Department of Neighborhoods places Broadway on the southwest side of Capitol Hill.
