= Delridge, Seattle =

District in Seattle, Washington

Coordinates: 47°32′13″N 122°21′37″W

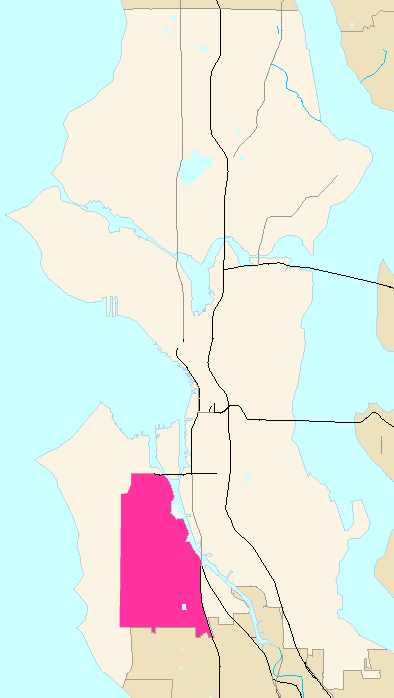
Delridge

Delridge is a district in Seattle, Washington, United States that stretches along Delridge Way, an arterial that follows the eastern slope of the valley of Longfellow Creek, from near its source just within the southern city limits north to the West Seattle Bridge over the Duwamish River. It is generally associated with the neighboring district of West Seattle, or even considered a sub-district of West Seattle.

The Delridge district is a mostly residential and open space district that lies generally between the eastern ridge on which South Seattle College sits and the western ridge that peaks in the High Point district. The Delridge Neighborhood Plan Area includes most of the area within the valley itself. Some other nearby neighborhoods also have Neighborhood Plan Areas.

The City of Seattle also uses the term Delridge more loosely to describe an informal collection of neighborhoods near the Delridge valley. This area is not precisely defined but often is considered to be bounded by the Duwamish River to the north and east, unincorporated White Center to the south, and West Seattle to the west along 35th Avenue SW. That area includes (north to south, east to west) the Pigeon Point, Youngstown, Puget Ridge, Riverview, High Point, Highland Park, Westwood, and Roxhill neighborhoods, and some industrial areas near the river.

Pigeon Point is the northern end of the bluff above the Duwamish, east of the old Youngstown neighborhood that surrounds the steel mill, in what real estate listings often now call North Delridge. South Delridge has also replaced Westwood on some maps, but neither of the new half-Delridge terms have entered common speech among longtime area residents.

Boeing Hill is the steep forested slope up which Highland Park Way courses. Like other nearby areas outside Delridge's own Longfellow Creek valley, this large greenbelt on the Duwamish's west bank is sometimes included in "Delridge Neighborhoods" in recent City maps and documents, as are the industrial area north of Spokane Street, Harbor Island, and the northern part of the heavy-industrial zone east of West Marginal Way along the lower Duwamish Waterway serving the Industrial District.

== Delridge neighborhoods ==
- Cottage Grove (southeastern "North Delridge")
- High Point (west of central Delridge)
- Highland Park (east of 16th Ave SW, south of Holden and north of Roxbury)
- North Delridge (the golf course, Youngstown north of it, Pigeon Point northeast of it, and Cottage Grove east of it)
- Pigeon Point (northeastern "North Delridge", east of Delridge and north of Andover)
- Puget Ridge (south of Pigeon Point and west of South Seattle College)
- Riverview (south of South Seattle College, east of 16th Ave SW, north of Highland Park)
- Roxhill (western half of Westwood)
- Snake Hill (between Camp Long and High Point, west of Longfellow Creek)
- South Delridge (eastern half of Westwood)
- Westwood (between 35th and 16th Ave South, near city limits)
- Youngstown (east of Avalon Way, around the steel mill)

=== Cottage Grove ===
Cottage Grove is an area originally platted by Puget Mill Company between 1918 and 1923. It is generally bounded on the north by SW Genesee St, on the west by West Seattle Golf Course, on the south by SW Juneau St and on the east by 21st Ave SW. It is the area immediately south and adjacent to Youngstown. It is sometimes referred to as Youngstown. For example, the Youngstown Cultural Arts Center is actually in Cottage Grove.

=== High Point ===
High Point is so named because it is the highest point of land in Seattle, 520 feet (158 m) above sea level. It is most well known for the recently demolished World War II temporary worker housing project of the same name that for five decades (1952–2002) served as low income housing, in particular for many refugees and immigrants when they first arrived in Seattle.

=== Highland Park ===
Highland Park is traditionally a working-class neighborhood, due to its proximity to Boeing Field and other employers in the Industrial District. As with White Center immediately to the south, it now features wide demographic and ethnic diversity. Westcrest Park is adjacent to the West Seattle Reservoir. It offers an off-leash dog area.

=== Pigeon Point ===
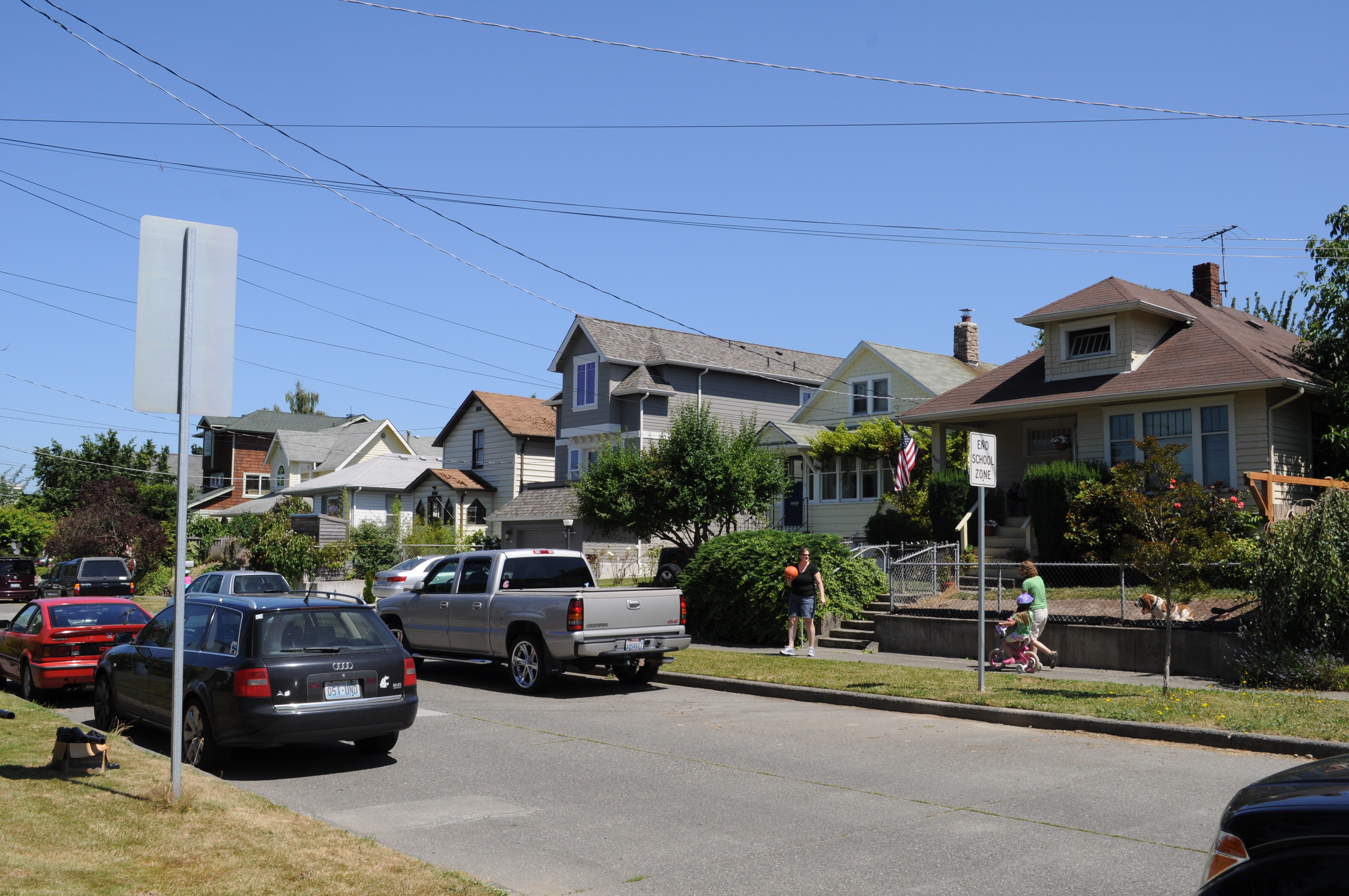
Houses on 20th Ave SW in Pigeon Point

The Pigeon Point neighborhood is located on a high bluff directly south of the West Seattle Bridge at the south end of Elliott Bay. Boundaries include SW Spokane Street on the north, Delridge Way SW on the west, West Marginal Way SW and the Duwamish Waterway on the east, and Puget Park/SW Oregon Street on the south. Pigeon Point is home to Pathfinder K-8 at Cooper.

=== Puget Ridge ===
The Puget Ridge neighborhood is located south of Pigeon Point and is filled with and surrounded by abundant greenspace. Boundaries include 21st Ave SW on the west, 16th Ave SW on the east, SW Dawson St on the north, and SW Orchard St to the south. Puget Ridge is the home of Puget Creek, Puget Park, Puget Ridge Edible Park, and Sanislo Elementary School.

=== Riverview ===
The Riverview neighborhood is just south of South Seattle College, east 16th Ave SW and north of Holden St. The West Duwamish Greenbelt make up the northern and western boundaries. Riverview is home to Riverview Playfield park, which has multiple tennis courts, ballfields, soccer fields, and a football field.

=== Roxhill ===
Roxhill is mostly residential areas, with a focal point of retail commerce. The neighborhood includes green spaces such as Roxhill Park, through which Longfellow Creek flows.

=== Snake Hill ===
Snake Hill is generally bounded on the north by Southwest Brandon Street (Camp Long and West Seattle Golf Course), on the west by 31st Avenue Southwest, on the south by Southwest Juneau Street (High Point) and on the east by 29th Avenue Southwest (Longfellow Creek).

=== Westwood ===
The partially restored wetland source of Longfellow Creek is in Westwood.

A "big box" plaza called Westwood Village has expanded in recent years. Stores include Target, Ulta, Daiso, Big 5, and Marshall's.

Many new town homes are being developed in this neighborhood.

=== Youngstown ===
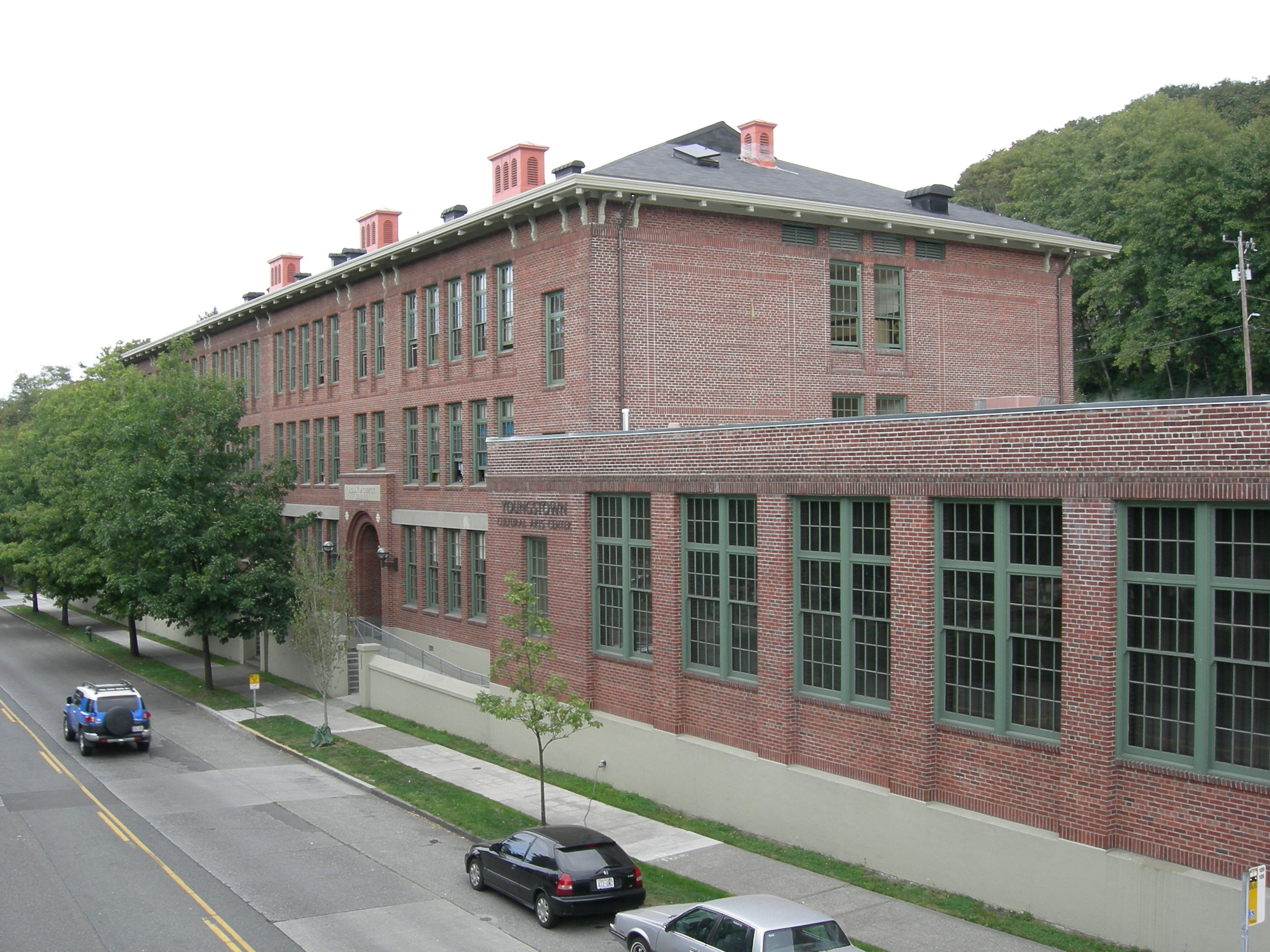
Youngstown Cultural Arts Center

The Youngstown neighborhood is the dell through which Longfellow Creek flows to the mudflats of the Duwamish River estuary. The neighborhood was rough and rowdy in the early years of white settlement, built in the 1900s for the immigrant steelworkers at nearby Seattle Steel (long thereafter Bethlehem Steel, now Nucor Steel). The Youngstown Cultural Arts Center (1999) opened in 2006, developed by the city-sponsored nonprofit Delridge Neighborhoods Development Association in the old Frank B. Cooper School (Youngstown School, 1917, renamed 1939) on Delridge Way. The school is listed on the National Register of Historic Places.

== See also ==
- Daylighting (streams) # Creeks in Seattle
- Seattle neighborhoods # Informal districts
