= West Woodland, Seattle =

Neighborhood in Seattle, Washington

Coordinates: 47°40′8″N 122°24′31″W

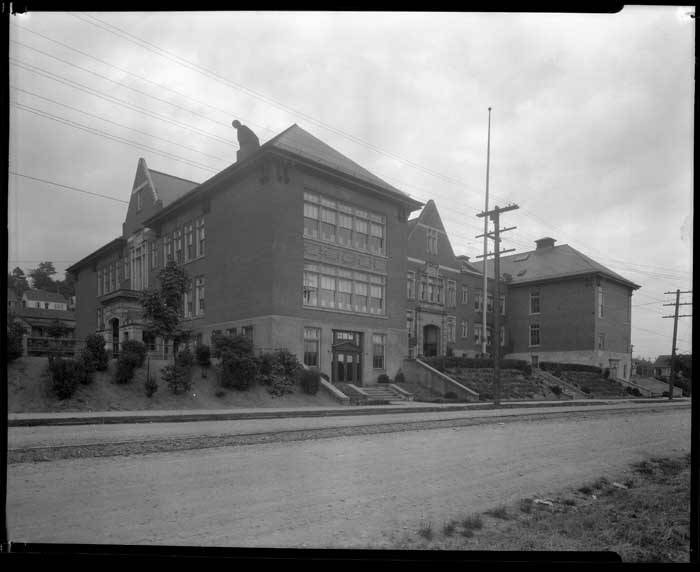
West Woodland School in 1928

West Woodland is a neighborhood in Seattle, Washington. The city's Department of Neighborhoods places West Woodland in the south east corner of Ballard. It is between Ballard and Phinney Ridge.

West Woodland includes the Ballard Brewery District and Gilman Playground.
