= West Seattle =

Neighborhood between the Duwamish River and Puget Sound

Coordinates: 47°33′40″N 122°23′12″W

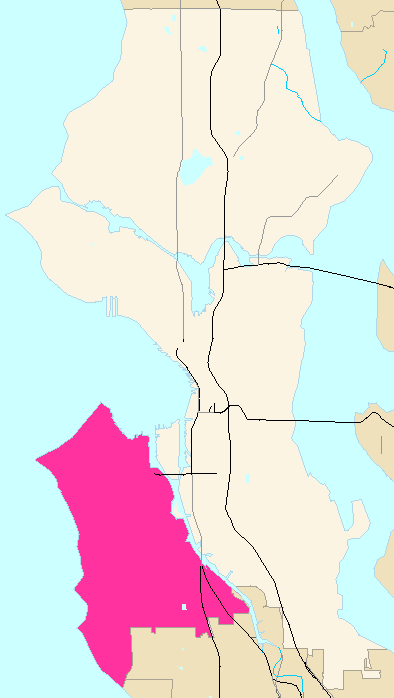
West Seattle

West Seattle is a conglomeration of neighborhoods in Seattle, Washington, United States. It comprises two of the thirteen districts, Delridge and Southwest, and encompasses all of Seattle west of the Duwamish River. It was incorporated as an independent town in 1902 before being annexed by Seattle five years later. Among the area's attractions are its saltwater beach parks along Elliott Bay and Puget Sound, including Alki Beach Park and Lincoln Park. The area is also known for its views of the Olympic Mountains to the west and the Cascade Range to the east. One-third of Seattle's green space and urban forest is located in West Seattle, much of it in the West Duwamish Greenbelt.

== History ==
West Seattle is the oldest neighborhood in the city and considered the birthplace of the modern city of Seattle. The Denny Party landed at Alki Point on November 13, 1851, after disembarking from the Exact. At the time, the peninsula had several Coast Salish villages inhabited by the Duwamish and Suquamish. The white settlement was later named "New York Alki", using a Chinook Jargon term for "by and by" or "in a while"; most of the Denny Party later moved across Elliott Bay, while Charles C. Terry remained on the peninsula and filed a plat for the town of Alki in 1853. The exposed, western side of the peninsula proved unsuitable for a major city due to its high winds and tides. The Southwest Seattle Historical Society maintains the Log House Museum at Alki Point.

The Duwamish village of t̕uʔəlalʔtxʷ, 'Herring's House', in modern-day West Seattle, was destroyed by arson on March 7, 1893. The village's inhabitants fled to Ballast Island, a small artificial island in Elliott Bay, and other areas around the region.

The independent community of West Seattle grew in the late 19th century and was incorporated as a fourth-class city in 1902. It was connected to Seattle proper by a ferry beginning in 1888 and a railroad and streetcar trestle that was completed two years later. The City of West Seattle opened its own streetcar line—among the first municipalities in the U.S. to do so—in 1906. The line was sold to the Seattle Electric Railway Company and extended in 1907 to the Fauntleroy area, where real estate development soon began. The city annexed the Alki and Youngstown neighborhoods on May 25, 1907, and was itself annexed into Seattle on June 29.

== Neighborhoods ==
=== High Point ===
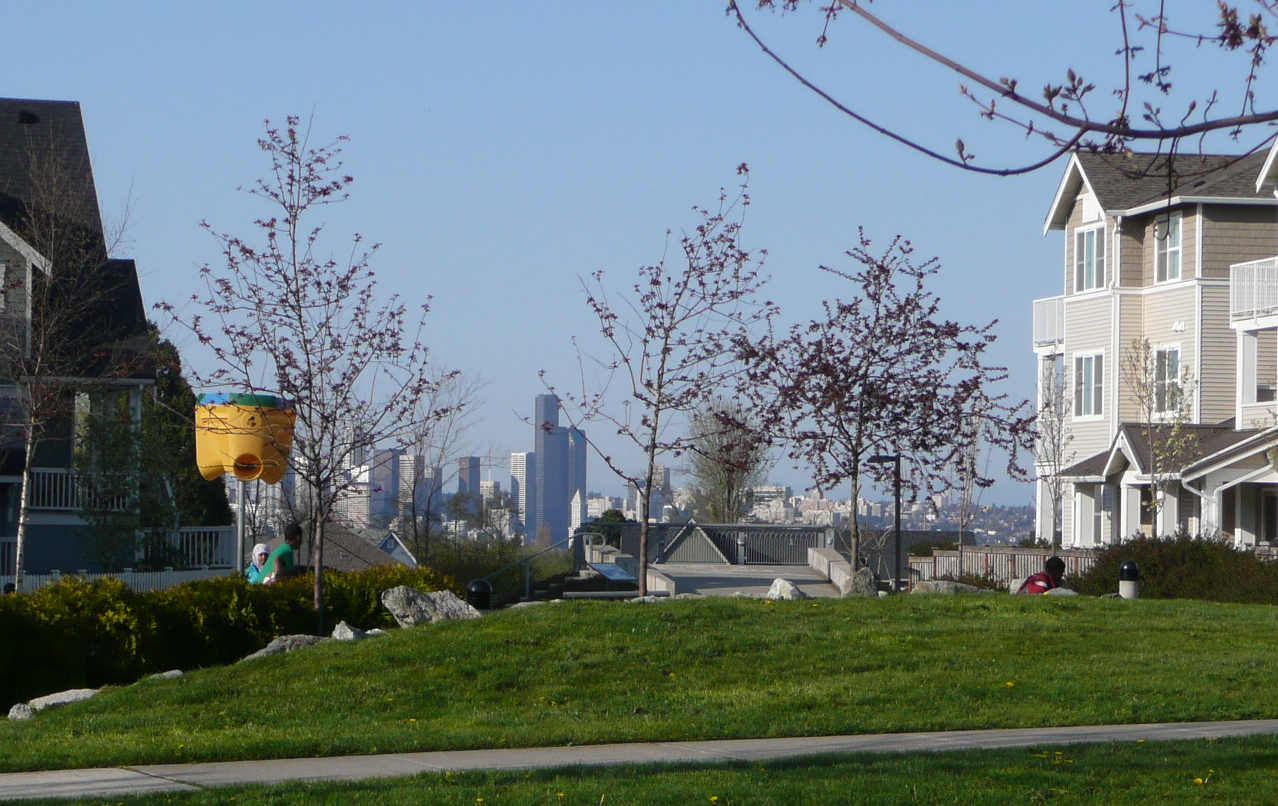
View of downtown Seattle from one of several common greenspaces

High Point is a neighborhood in the Delridge district. It is so named because it contains the highest point in the city of Seattle: Myrtle Reservoir Park at the intersection of 35th Avenue SW and SW Myrtle Street, which is 520 feet (160 m) above sea level. The neighborhood is located on the east side of 35th Ave SW, with approximate north and south boundaries at SW Juneau Street and SW Myrtle Street.

The hill is dominated by two large water towers; it is also the location of Our Lady of Guadalupe School and Parish, on the peak of the highest hill in West Seattle. It is also known for the High Point Projects which were torn down in 2005 to make way for new mixed-income housing. High Point is one of Seattle's most diverse neighborhoods, with a substantial immigrant population from Southeast Asia and East Africa. High Point Branch Library serves the area.

==== Redevelopment ====
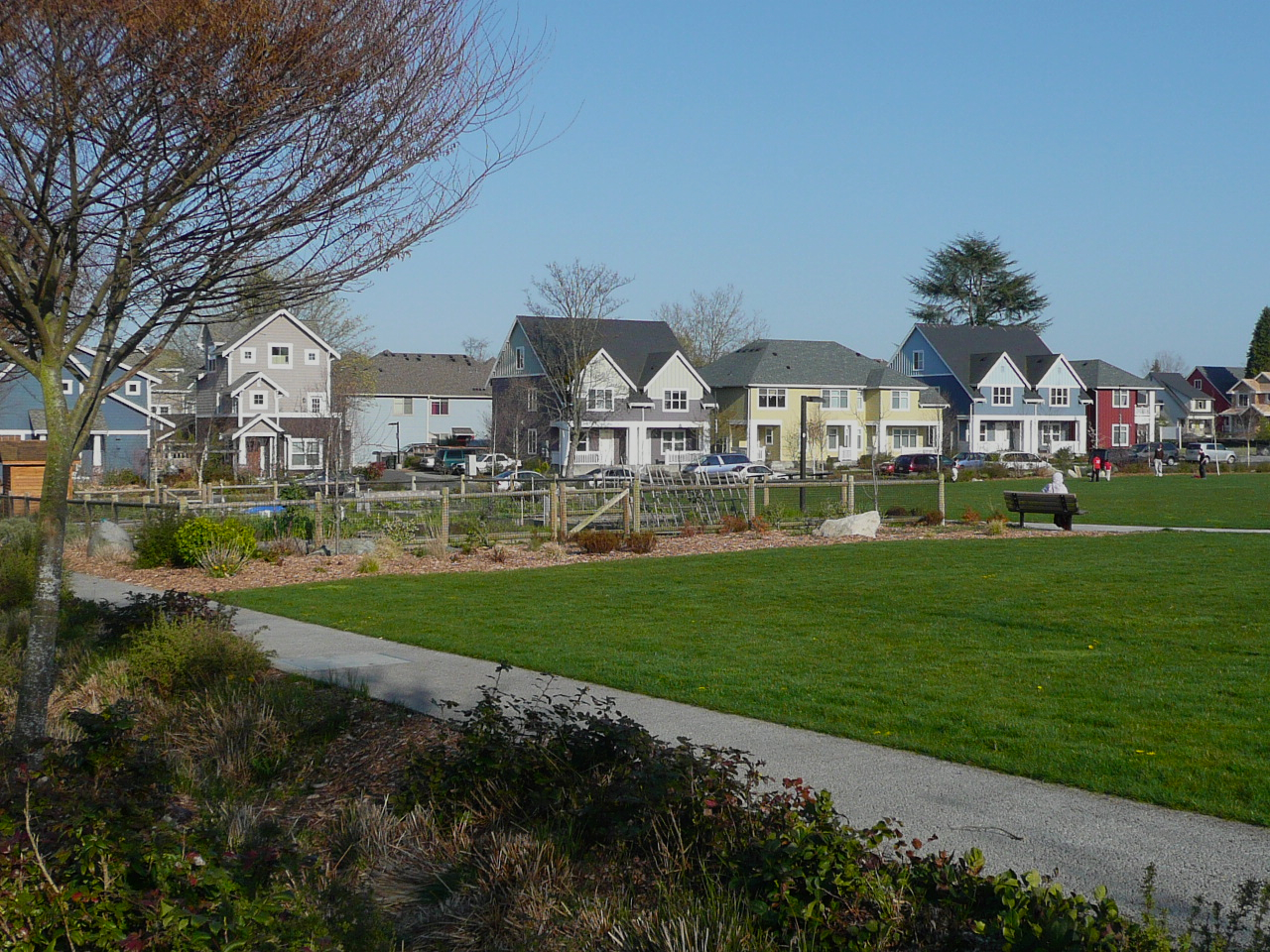
Community garden and open play field with typical house variety in background.

The neighborhood was originally developed during World War II to provide government housing, and it remained a district of predominantly low-income housing through the 1990s. In 2003, the Seattle Housing Authority began work on the first phase of a six-year project to redevelop High Point into a mixed-income community. The redevelopment removed all existing housing, roads, and utilities. In their place, new roads, underground infrastructure, about 1,600 new housing units, and community facilities were built.

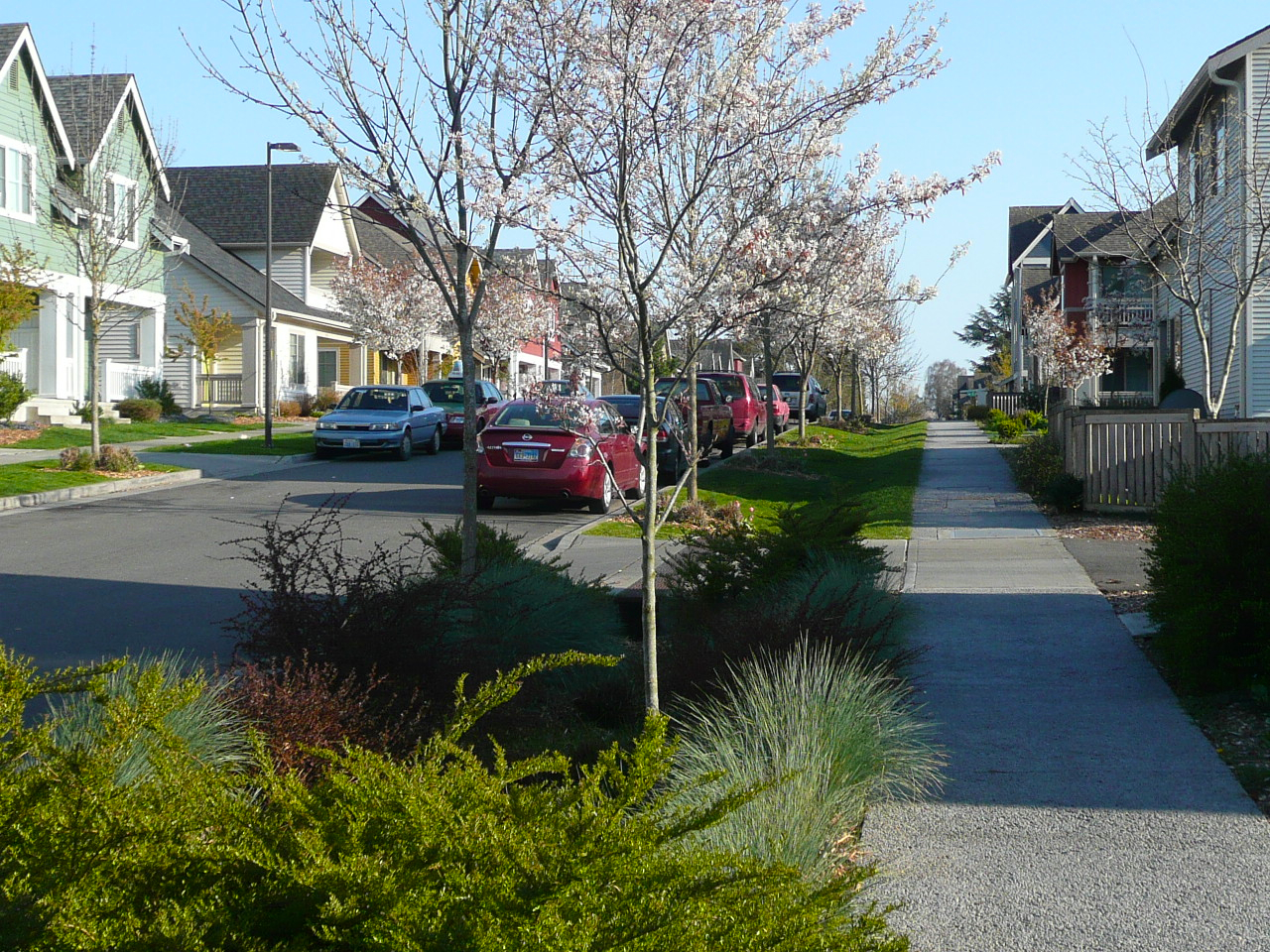
Houses are built close to the street. Bioretention swales or rain gardens treat and control stormwater from the streets with plants.

The redevelopment embraced many sustainable development principles. The site and rental housing are certified at the highest BuiltGreen levels; most housing is Energy Star rated. The site makes extensive use of permeable paving, including porous sidewalks, parking areas, and the only porous pavement street in the state of Washington. Some houses were built to reduce symptoms for people with asthma. The neighborhood redevelopment plan has been recognized with some of the most prestigious land use and development awards, among them the 2007 ULI Global Award of Excellence, the 2007 EPA National Award for Smart Growth, and the 2007 Rudy Bruner Award for Urban Excellence.

=== Alki ===
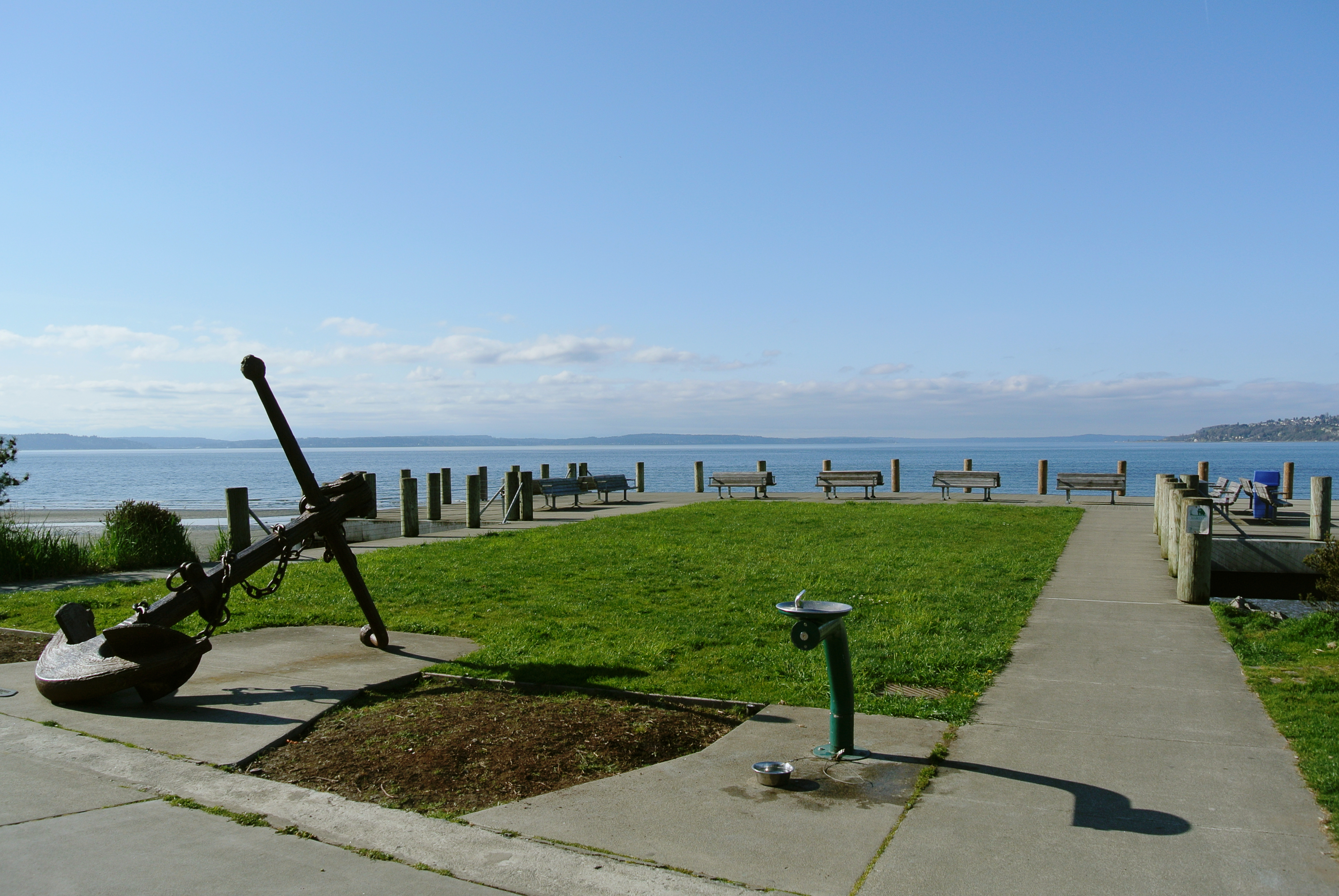
Duwamish Head, between eastern coast and Alki Beach

Alki Point is traditionally credited as the point where the Denny Party founded Seattle before moving across Elliott Bay to what is now Downtown. A similar landing at Alki has been reenacted annually since 1950 as part of the week-long Seafair celebration of Seattle's marine and boating heritage. Seafair coincides with West Seattle festivities including Hi-Yu and the West Seattle Summer Fest street festival held each July. Along with its historical significance, Alki is also home to the most popular beach in the Seattle area. Fittingly named Alki Beach, it features a long strip of sandy beach full of driftwood, seashells, and fire pits. Low tides offer West Seattleites an opportunity to explore marine life in tidepools. Alki also hosts a flat bike and running trail from which visitors can view the Seattle skyline, Puget Sound, and the Olympic mountains.

=== The Junction ===
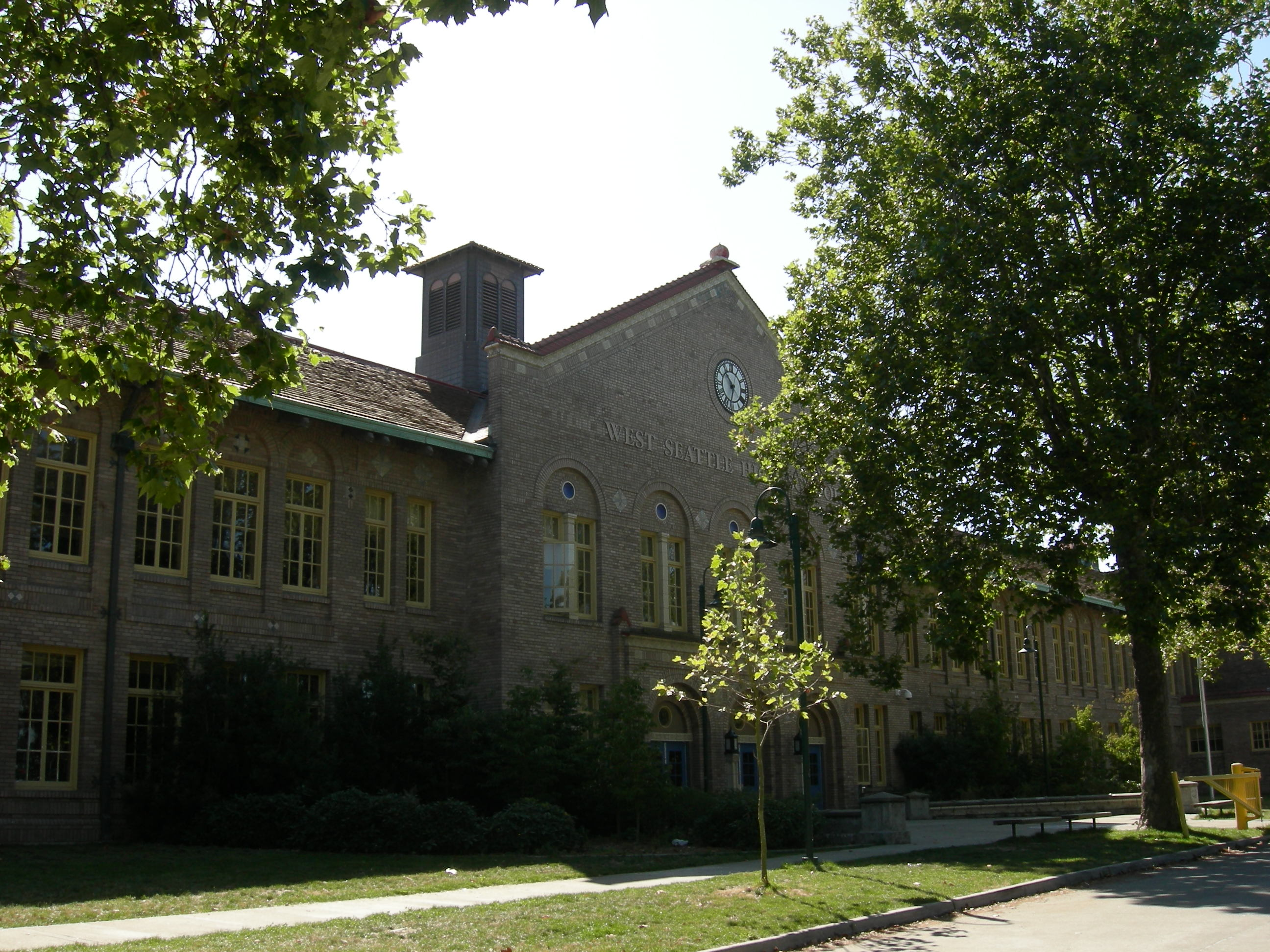
West Seattle High School, in the Admiral District

The Junction is the name used for the commercial district that centers on the intersection of California Avenue S.W. and S.W. Alaska Street. It is sometimes called "West Seattle Junction" or "Alaska Junction" by residents.

West Seattle also has two other intersections of note: Admiral Junction in the northern part of the peninsula where California Avenue S.W. and S.W. Admiral Way meet, and Morgan Junction at the southern end where Fauntleroy Way S.W., S.W. Morgan Street, and California Avenue S.W. intersect.

The West Seattle Summer Fest, a multi-day street festival at the Junction, is hosted annually in July. It includes live music, shopping, art galleries, and other events in the neighborhood. The festival was established in 1982 and was cancelled for 2020 and 2021 due to the COVID-19 pandemic.

=== Other neighborhoods ===
The Westwood Village shopping center, between S.W. Trenton and S.W. Barton Streets in the south end of West Seattle, has undergone several makeovers and now provides a mall-like shopping experience, including a Target and a Marshall's. However, it is unlikely that a movie theater will be allowed here because of restricted parking.

Before the annexation of West Seattle, the neighborhood of White Center radiated north and south of Roxbury, but now with the city line going down the middle of the old neighborhood is it unclear whether the northern part of the area should still be referred to as part of the White Center neighborhood.

West Seattle also includes suburban neighborhoods in the southwest end, including Gatewood, Fauntleroy, Arbor Heights, and Arroyo Heights in the southernmost section of West Seattle. These neighborhoods are located near pt. Williams and the surrounding areas including the Fauntleroy ferry terminal, Lincoln Park, and The Arbor Heights pool.

== Transportation ==
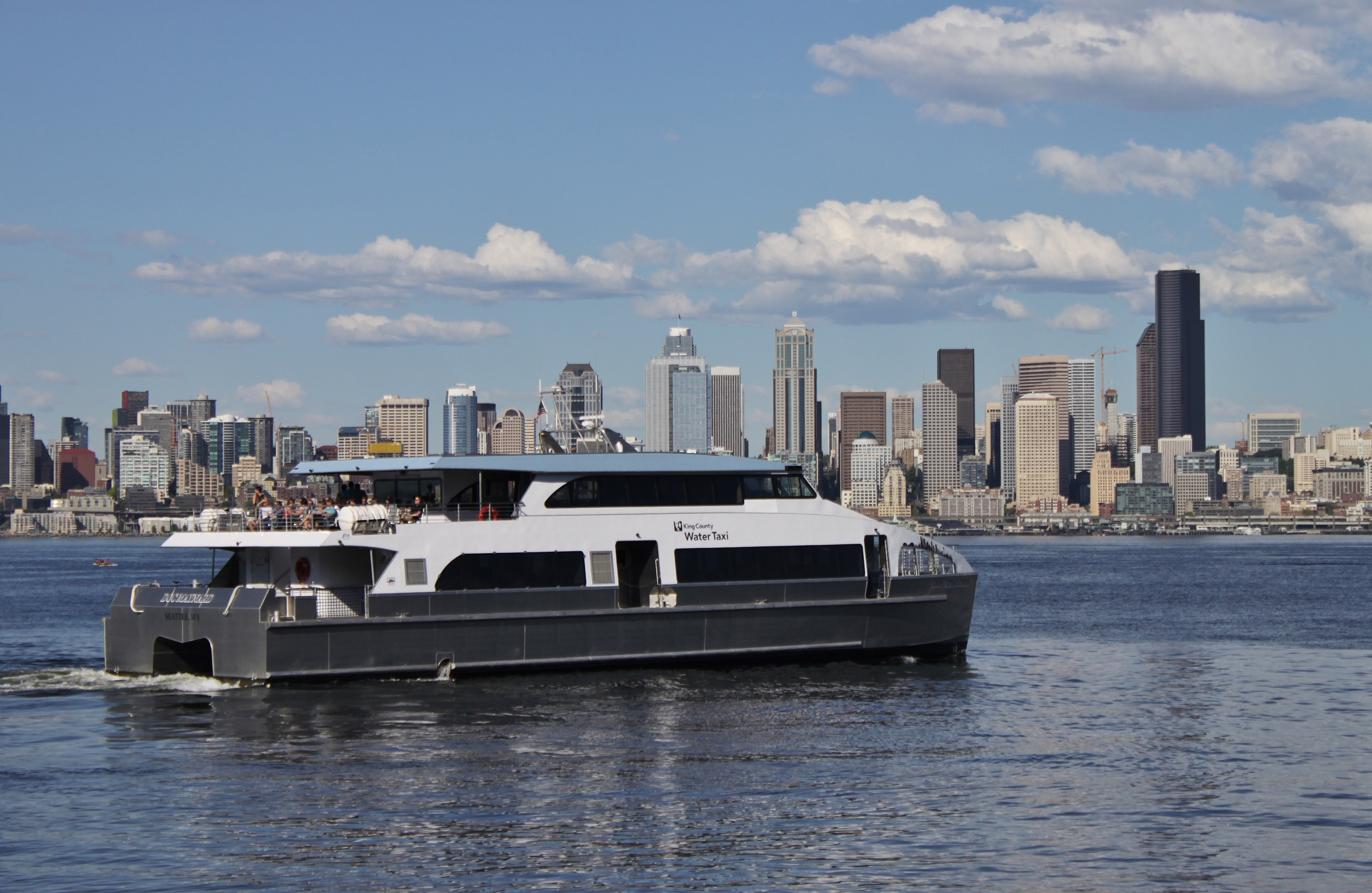
The King County Water Taxi connects West Seattle to Downtown Seattle

West Seattle has three bridges over the Duwamish River that connect the peninsula to SODO and Downtown Seattle. The high-level West Seattle Bridge, opened in 1984, carries seven lanes of traffic on a short freeway that continues towards Interstate 5 on the Spokane Street Viaduct. The bridge was closed from 2020 to 2022 for extensive repairs after the rapid growth of cracks in the concrete was discovered. The parallel, low-level Spokane Street Bridge is a swing bridge that opened in 1991 and also carries a multi-use trail across Harbor Island. To the southeast is the First Avenue South Bridge, a pair of movable bridges on State Route 99.

The peninsula's major north–south streets include California Avenue, which runs from Hamilton Viewpoint to Thistle Street; Fauntleroy Way, which connects the Fauntleroy ferry terminal to the West Seattle Bridge; 35th Avenue Southwest; and Delridge Way. Alki Avenue and Harbor Avenue form a continuous ring along the north shore of the peninsula and have a parallel multi-use trail.

West Seattle is served by bus service from King County Metro, the county's public transit system, with connections to Downtown Seattle and other nearby destinations. These routes include the RapidRide C Line on California Avenue and Fauntleroy Way and RapidRide H Line on Delridge Way; both lines have bus rapid transit features and continue across the West Seattle Bridge to Downtown Seattle. Washington State Ferries operates automobile ferries from the Fauntleroy terminal to Vashon Island and Southworth on the Kitsap Peninsula. The passenger-only King County Water Taxi also runs between Seacrest Park and Downtown Seattle; it was upgraded to year-round all-day service in 2022. King County Metro operates shuttle buses that connect West Seattle Junction, Alki, and the Admiral District with water taxi runs from Seacrest Park.

Sound Transit, the regional public transit agency of the Seattle metropolitan area, plans to build a Link light rail extension between Downtown Seattle and West Seattle. The project was approved in the 2016 Sound Transit 3 ballot measure as one of two in-city corridors and is estimated to cost at least $6.7 billion to construct. The extension will be part of the 3 Line and is scheduled to open in 2035 with three stations in West Seattle, a new bridge over the Duwamish River, and a temporary terminus at SODO station. The remainder of the 3 Line to Snohomish County would open later in the decade after the completion of the Ballard Link Extension. The three stations in West Seattle are expected to be an underground station at Alaska Junction on the site of the Jefferson Square shopping center; a retained cut station at Avalon Way; and an elevated station at Delridge Way near Andover Street.

== Media ==
The community is served by the West Seattle Herald, which published a weekly newspaper until 2021 and was later replaced by Westside Seattle after a merger with the Ballard News-Tribune. A hyperlocal blog website named the West Seattle Blog was established in December 2005 and has remained independently owned and operated.

== Education ==
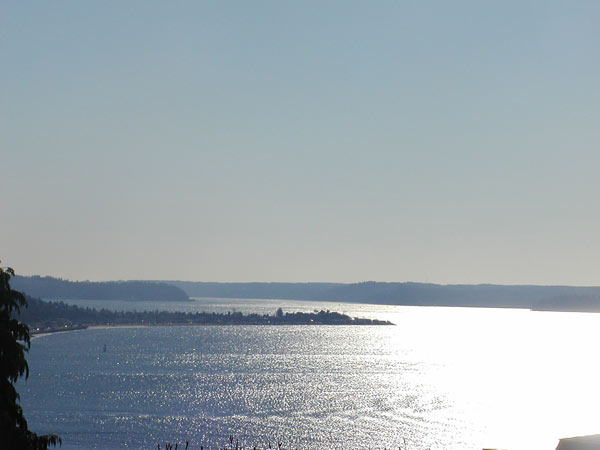
Alki Point, seen from Queen Anne

West Seattle is home to South Seattle College, West Seattle High School, Chief Sealth International High School, Seattle Lutheran High School, Gatewood Elementary School, Madison Middle School, Denny International Middle School, Roxhill Elementary School, K-5 STEM at Boren, Alki Elementary School, Lafayette Elementary School, Highland Park Elementary School, Sanislo Elementary School, Pathfinder K-8, Holy Family School Seattle, Holy Rosary West Seattle, Genesee Hill Elementary School, Our Lady of Guadalupe, Hope Lutheran School, Arbor Heights Elementary School, and Fairmount Park Elementary School.

== Parks and recreation ==
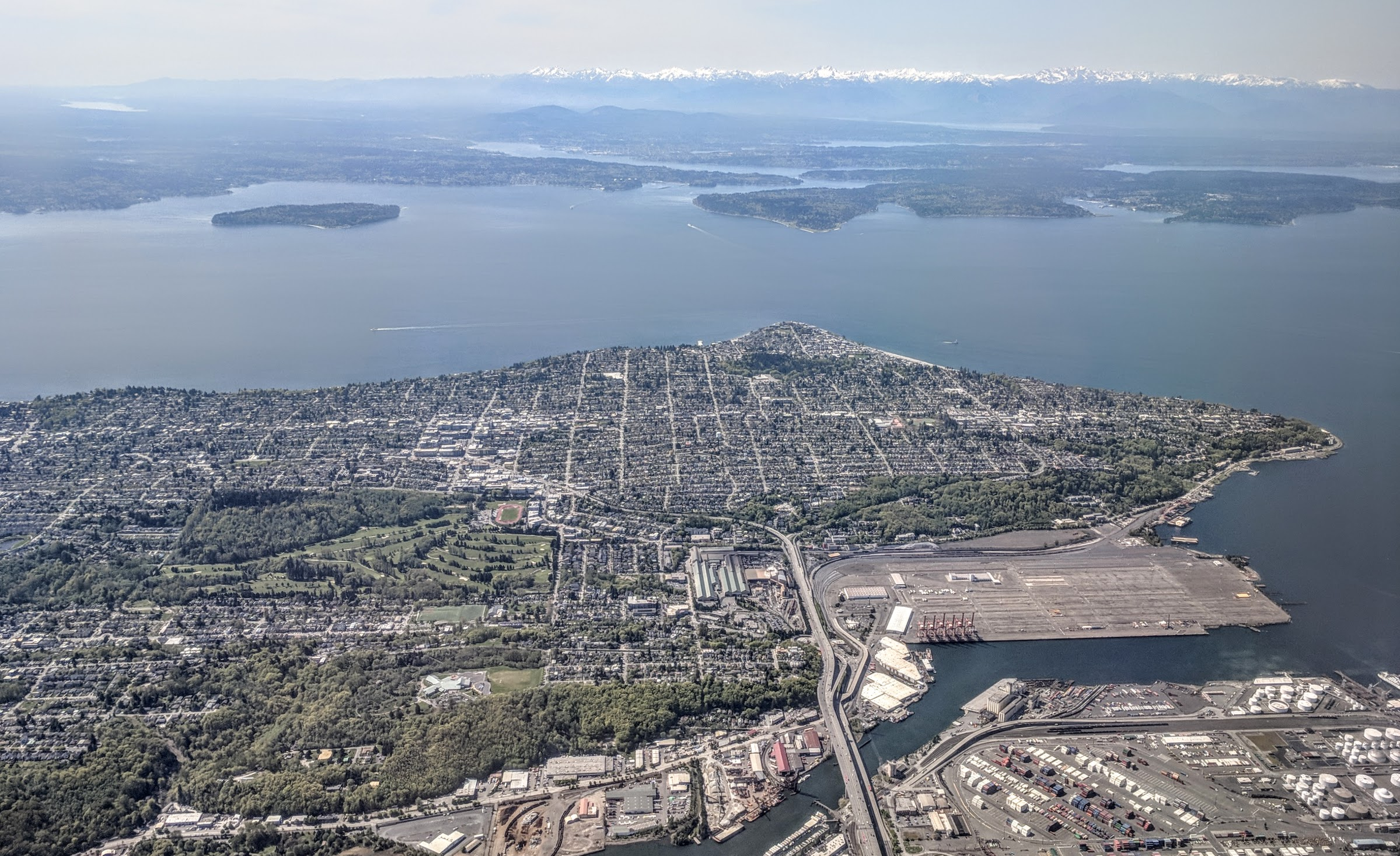
Aerial view of West Seattle from the east, with the Puget Sound, Bainbridge Island, and the Olympic Mountains to the west

West Seattle has many parks along the waterfront, including Lincoln Park and the Emma Schmitz Overlook to Jack Block Park facing the port. The West Seattle Golf Course, West Seattle Stadium, and Camp Long Outdoor Learning Center are found in the middle of the peninsula with unique opportunities to recreate outdoors including overnight camping in rustic cabins. In addition, Seattle Parks and Recreation maintains Community Centers (Alki, Delridge, and Hiawatha), Coleman Pool, SouthWest Pool, and the SouthWest Teen Life Center. There is a historic bath house on Alki Beach as well as the Dakota Place Park with its restored light station.

== List of neighborhoods ==
- Admiral, also known as North Admiral
- Alki
- Arbor Heights
- Belvedere
- Delridge
- Fauntleroy
- Fairmount Park
- Gatewood
- Genesee
- Harbor Ave
- Highland Park
- Lincoln Park
- Luna Park
- Morgan Junction
- Pigeon Point
- Puget Ridge
- Riverview
- Roxbury
- Schmitz Park
- Seaview
- Sunrise Heights
- Sunset
- Westwood
- West Seattle Junction
