= Northwest School =

Northwest School may refer to:

- Northwest School (art), a 20th-century art movement centered in the Pacific Northwest
- Northwest School of the Arts, a grade 6 through 12 art magnet school in Charlotte, North Carolina, U.S.
- Northwest Christian School, a private Christian school in Phoenix, Arizona, United States
- Northwest Elementary School, a public school in the Reading School District
- Northwest Film School, a private, non-profit educational institution specializing in digital media production
- North-West School, Hartford, Connecticut
- Northwest School, Seattle, a private school in Seattle, Washington, U.S.

== See also ==
- Northwest Independent School District, a North Texas, U.S., public school district
- Northwest Area School District, public school district in Pennsylvania
- Northwest High School (disambiguation)
- Northwest Middle School (disambiguation)
