= NWH =

NWH may refer to these medical facilities:

- Newton-Wellesley Hospital, Newton, Massachusetts, U.S.
- Northern Westchester Hospital, Mount Kisco, New York, U.S.
- North Wales Hospital, Denbigh, Wales (closed 1995)

== See also ==
- No Way Home (disambiguation)
  - Spider-Man: No Way Home, a 2021 Marvel superhero film
- NWHL (disambiguation)
- NWHS (disambiguation)
