= NWHS =

NWHS may refer to:

- Niles West High School, Skokie, Illinois, U.S.
- North Walsham High School, Norfolk, England
- North Wilkes High School, Hays, North Carolina, U.S.
- Northwest High School (disambiguation), various American schools
- Northwestern High School (disambiguation), various American schools
- NorthWood High School, Napanee, Indiana, U.S.
- "Not What He Seems", the 11th episode of the second season of Gravity Falls

== See also ==
- NWH (disambiguation)
