= James Stephen (architect) =

American architect

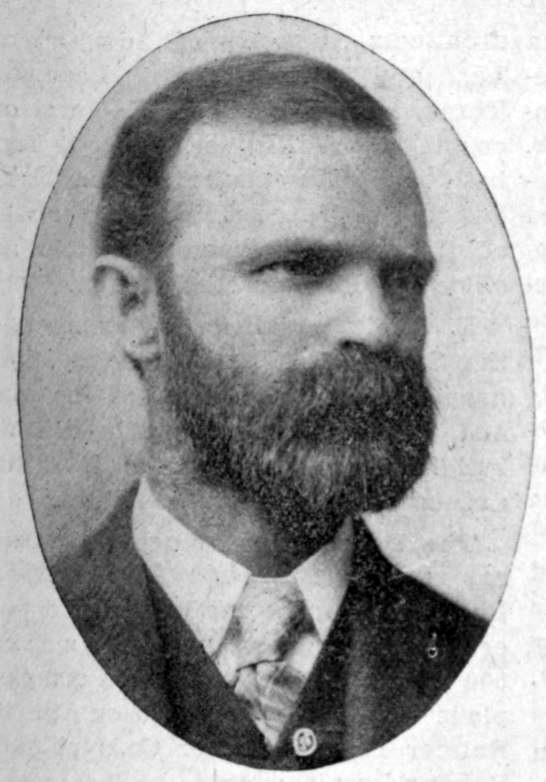
- Stephen c. 1912
- Born: March 29, 1858; Ontario, Canada
- Died: September 27, 1938 (aged 80); Seattle, Washington, United States
- Occupation: Architect

James Stephen (Note: Frequently misspelled Stephens) (March 29, 1858 – September 27, 1938) was an American architect. A founding member of the Washington state chapter of the American Institute of Architects, he was the premier school architect in Western Washington state in the early 1900s. Originally working with wood frame buildings, around 1908 he brought more modern and fire-resistive designs to the Seattle area. He, and later with his son, was responsible for the design of at least fifty schools in Washington as well as many other kinds of buildings. At least three of the schools are listed on the National Register of Historic Places.

== Early life ==
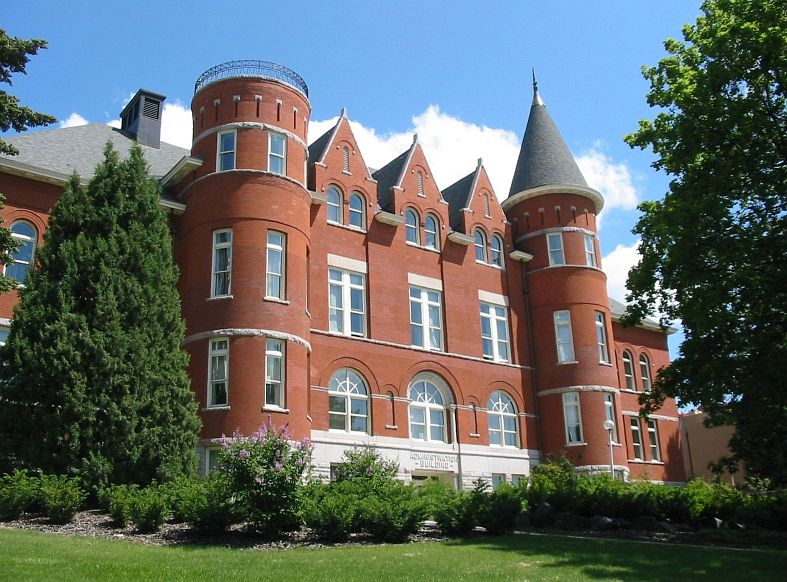
Thompson Hall at WSU, designed by Josenhans & Stephen in 1895

Stephen was born in Ontario, Canada in 1858 to Alexander and Mary Stephen, both Scottish immigrants. He moved to Detroit, Michigan in 1864 at age six. His father was a skilled cabinetmaker and James trained to be one too. He also learned to make pipe organs. He learned the skills of an architect through a correspondence course and began practice in that field in Hyde Park, Illinois from 1885 to 1887. He later moved to Pasadena, California where he practiced 1887–89, and then on to Washington when there was great need for architects during rebuilding after the Great Seattle Fire of 1889.

He practiced in Seattle alone from 1889 to 1893 and then partnered with Timotheus Josenhans (Note: Josenhans would subsequently partner with Norris B. Allan and after designing several early buildings for the University of Washington would have a successful and prolific career throughout the 1900s and 1910s.) for a short time (1894–1897) when the team designed buildings on the Washington Agricultural College campus (now Washington State University). During the recession of the mid to late 1890s, Stephen returned to cabinetmaking and found work with the Moran Shipyards in Seattle and Alaska. In 1894 he was one of the sixteen Seattle and Tacoma architects that helped organize the Washington state chapter of the American Institute of Architects.

== Seattle schools ==
In 1899, he was hired by the Seattle School District to design several schools and his plan was adopted as a "Model School Plan" for subsequent elementary schools built by the district. He became the official school architect from 1901 to 1909 where he designed and supervised the construction of fifty Seattle school buildings. His early designs used economical and flexible wood frames that easily allowed for phased development and expansion. An eight-, twelve-, or 20-room school could be constructed from the model. The schools used standard floor plans and interior finishes but the exteriors varied greatly from school to school as Stephen used his cabinetmaker skills to design different wood detailing of the exterior elevations.

Around the time his eldest son Frederick graduated as an architect from the University of Pennsylvania, Stephen traveled to the mid-west and New York to study newer trends in school construction. In 1908, the two started a partnership (Stephen and Stephen) and, probably influenced by what he had seen on the trip as well as his son's training, began to design schools with fireproof materials. They used concrete, brick, and terra cotta and included modern features such as state-of-the-art lavatories, intercoms, and clock systems. His specifications for heating systems were particularly noteworthy. A report on the benefits of modern designs led for a second Model School Plan being adopted by the district. These masonry structures were designed in the then-popular Gothic Revival and Jacobean style.

Stephen resigned from the school district in 1909 after having designed schools that cost in aggregate $1.5 million (equivalent to $53,750,000 in 2025). His head draftsman Edgar Blair was hired by the district to replace him as chief architect.

== Other work ==
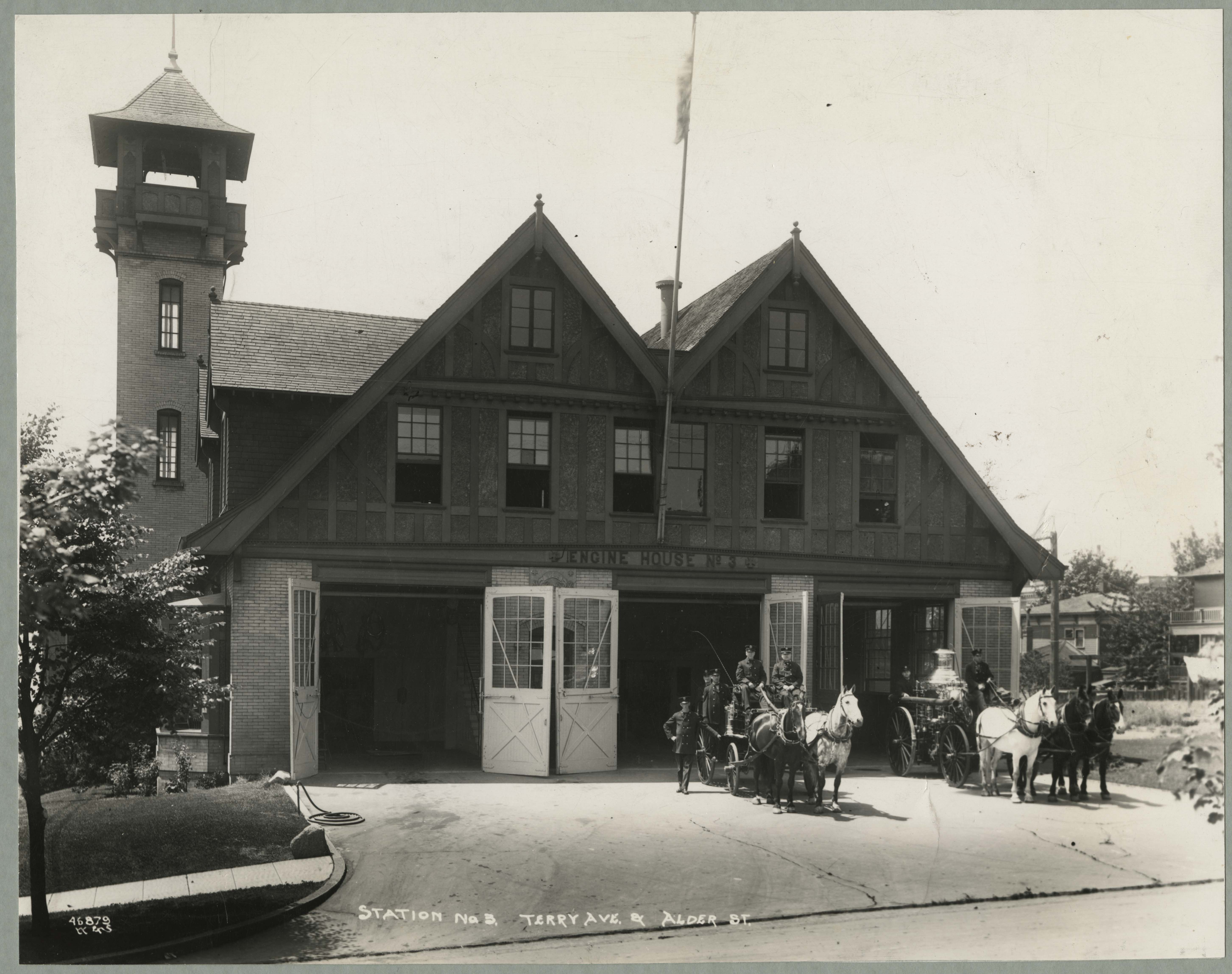
Engine House No. 3 (1903). Stephen would later use a similar motif for the Seward School.

Simultaneously to his position as Seattle school architect, he continued in his private practice designing residential, religious, and commercial structures, including the original portion of the downtown Seattle YMCA building.

Schools of his design were built in Redmond, Hoquiam, Renton, Auburn, Olympia, Everett, Kirkland, and Bremerton. Schools produced after his son joined the practice can be found in Edmonds, Wenatchee, Cashmere, Richmond Beach, Vancouver, Ellensburg, Kirkland, Cle Elum, Chehalis, Fall City, and Port Townsend.

He became a full member of the American Institute of Architects in 1902 and was president of the Washington chapter in 1907-08 as well as a delegate to the national convention in Chicago in 1907. In 1910, he ran for a position on the Seattle city council and was endorsed by The Seattle Star. In 1912, he ran for a position on the Seattle school board.

A decade after he left the employ of the school district, he became a vocal critic of the school building program claiming it was extravagant and wasteful. He cited the construction of the Roosevelt High School which was estimated to cost $1.25 million (equivalent to $22,562,966 in 2025), nearly equal to the combined cost of the four newest Seattle high schools. In 1921, he said this extravagance was typical of schools designed in the prior four years.

In 1919 William G. Brust was hired on to the firm as a partner. As Stephen, Stephen and Brust, the 1920s would be their most prolific decade. In addition to their work on public schools they would be responsible for hundreds of commercial buildings built throughout out Puget Sound during this time, including many of Seattle's suburban Masonic lodges and multiple churches and private homes. After the firm's dissolution in 1931 Brust would continue to practice into the 1940s.

== Personal ==
Stephen married Ida Mary Rowan (Oct 1858-February 2, 1953), a native of Missouri in 1882. They had four sons - Frederick B. (born February 1883 in Illinois), Walter M (born September 1884 in Illinois), Chester R (born March 1887 in Illinois), and James H (born March 1893 in Seattle). Frederick was the only son to become an architect; Chester was an electrician while James was an orchardist in Leavenworth, Washington,

Stephen retired from the practice in 1923 or 1928 and died in Seattle on September 27, 1938 after a ten-year illness.

== Projects ==
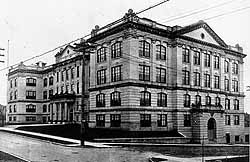
The Queen Anne High School, Seattle, designed by Stephen and built in 1909

- Seattle wood-frame schools based on his original model
  - Allen School, 1904, now the Phinney Neighborhood Center
  - Interlake School, 1904, now the Wallingford Center
  - Summit School, 1905, now the Northwest School and listed on the National Register of Historic Places (NRHP)
  - John Hay School, 1905
  - Seward School, 1905, now TOPS @ Seward
  - Stevens School, 1906
  - Latona School, 1906, now the John Stanford International School
- Seattle masonry schools based on his second model
  - Emerson School, 1909
  - Colman School, 1909, now the Northwest African American Museum
  - Greenwood School, 1909
  - Queen Anne High School, 1909, listed on the NRHP
  - Lincoln High School, 1907
- Buildings in over 50 school districts in Washington
  - Everett High School, Everett, listed on the NRHP
