= List of schools of the Seattle School District =

List of schools of the Seattle School District in the state of Washington in the US

This is the list of schools within the Seattle Public Schools school district. Seattle Public Schools operates elementary schools, K-8 schools, middle schools serving grades 6–8, high schools, and Alternative schools and special programs. The tables below provide data on the demographics of students in Seattle Public Schools. All data is obtained from the Office of the Superintendent of Public Instruction (OSPI) of Washington state and is from October 2007.

== Current Schools ==
=== Elementary schools ===
| School | Est. (Note: Denotes original date of establishment of the school, changes in name and/or location noted in corresponding footnote) | Neighborhood (Note: Denotes location of school by Seattle neighborhood, does not necessary correspond with attendance area) | Nickname | Spring 2023 Enrollment |
|---|---|---|---|---|
| Adams | 1889 (Note: Opened as Ballard School in 1889. Joined Seattle schools in 1907.) | Ballard | Eagles | 319 |
| Alki | 1913 (Note: Original school opened 1908.) | Alki | Seagulls | 298 |
| Arbor Heights | 1948 | Arbor Heights | Jr. Seahawks | 518 |
| Bailey Gatzert | 1921 | Atlantic | Bears | 364 |
| Daniel Bagley | 1907 (Note: Current building opened in 1930) | Green Lake | Bees | 323 |
| Beacon Hill Int'l | 1899 | Beacon Hill | Tigers | 341 |
| Bryant | 1919 | Ravenna | Hawks | 487 |
| Frantz Coe | 1905 | Queen Anne | Cougars | 456 |
| Cascadia | 2013 | Green Lake | Dragons | 504 |
| Cedar Park | 1959 | Lake City | Wolves | 247 |
| Concord Int'l | 1914 | South Park | N/A | 304 |
| B.F. Day | 1892 (Note: Oldest continuously operating elementary school in Seattle.) | Fremont | Sun Dragons | 397 |
| Dearborn Park Int'l | 1971 | Beacon Hill | Dragons | 355 |
| Decatur | 2017 | Wedgwood | Gators | 208 |
| Dunlap | 1898 | Dunlap | Dolphins | 297 |
| Emerson | 1909 | Rainier Beach | Eagles | 329 |
| Fairmount Park | 1955 | Fairmount Park | Falcons | 442 |
| Gatewood | 1910 | Gatewood | Gators | 366 |
| Genesee Hill | 2016 | West Seattle | Red Foxes | 514 |
| Graham Hill | 1961 | Seward Park | Blue Whales | 266 |
| Green Lake | 1902 (Note: Current building opened in 1970) | Green Lake | Dragons | 339 |
| Greenwood | 1909 | Greenwood | Stars | 346 |
| Hawthorne (Note: Named for Nathaniel Hawthorne) | 1913 (Note: Current building 1989) | Mount Baker | Phoenix | 360 |
| John Hay | 1905 (Note: Current building opened in 1989) | Queen Anne | Jaguars | 275 |
| Highland Park | 1919 | Delridge | Mustangs | 305 |
| Kimball (Note: Named after Captain George W. Kimball.) | 1971 | North Beacon Hill | Cougars | 376 |
| Lafayette | 1893 (Note: 1893 as part of West Seattle School District, renamed 1918.) | North Admiral | Leopards | 491 |
| Laurelhurst | 1928 | Laurelhurst | Bears | 280 |
| Lawton (Note: Named similarly to Fort Lawton, after Henry Ware Lawton.) | 1913 (Note: Traces back to Salmon Bay School in 1895, rebuilt as Lawton 1913.) | Magnolia | Dolphins | 333 |
| Leschi | 1909 (Note: Original building demolished in 1988.) | Leschi | Bulldog Pups | 305 |
| Lowell | 1890 (Note: Original building demolished in 1959.) | Capitol Hill | Dragons | 385 |
| Loyal Heights | 1919 (Note: Current building opened in 1932.) | Ballard | Beavers | 499 |
| Madrona | 2000 | Madrona | Panthers | 231 |
| Magnolia | 1927 | Magnolia | Orcas | 358 |
| Maple | 1865 (Note: Current building opened in 1971.) | Beacon Hill | Monarchs | 436 |
| Thurgood Marshall | 1909 (Note: Opened as Colman School in 1909. Current building opened in 1991. Renamed Thurgood Marshall in 1996.) | Atlantic | Bulldog Pups | 477 |
| Martin Luther King Jr. | 1904 (Note: Opened as Brighton School in 1904. Current building opened in 2005. Renamed Martin Luther King Jr. in 2010.) | Brighton | Dragons | 286 |
| McDonald Int'l | 1914 (Note: Closed in 1981. Reopened in 2012) | Wallingford | Scotties | 456 |
| McGilvra | 1899 (Note: Opened at current location in 1913) | Madison Park | Wildcats | 222 |
| Montlake | 1924 | Montlake | Wolves | 181 |
| John Muir | 1910 | Mount Baker | Lions | 346 |
| North Beach | 1958 | Ballard | Seals | 365 |
| James Baldwin | 1956 | Northgate | Eagles | 213 |
| Olympic Hills | 1954 | Olympic Hills | Otters | 502 |
| Olympic View | 1903 | Maple Leaf | Eagles | 365 |
| Queen Anne | | Queen Anne | Explorers | 199 |
| John Rogers | 1956 | Meadowbrook | Otters | 262 |
| Rainier View | 1953 | Rainier Valley | Tigers | 230 |
| Rising Star | 1907 (Note: 1862 is date of establishment of Van Asselt Elementary School. Joined Seattle schools in 1907. Van Asselt moved to current location in 2009, and was renamed Rising Star Elementary School in 2019.) | South Beacon Hill | Firebirds | 342 |
| Roxhill | 1958 | Roxhill | Stars | 290 |
| Sacajawea | 1955 | Maple Leaf | Eagles | 231 |
| Sand Point | 1958 | Windermere | Squirrels | 199 |
| Sanislo | 1970 | Riverview | | 180 |
| John Stanford Int'l | 1891 | Wallingford | | 429 |
| Stevens | 1906 | Capitol Hill | N/A | 165 |
| Thornton Creek | 1961 (Note: Current building opened in 2016. Originally named Decatur Elementary, renamed in 2008.) | Wedgwood | Dragonflies | 456 |
| View Ridge | 1948 | View Ridge | Otters | 305 |
| Viewlands | 1954 | Broadview | Orcas | 272 |
| Wedgwood | 1955 | Wedgwood | Marmots | 359 |
| West Seattle | | West Seattle | Huskies | 386 |
| West Woodland | 1910 (Note: Current building opened in 1991.) | Ballard | Wildcats | 397 |
| Whittier | 1908 (Note: Current building opened in 1999.) | Ballard | Wildcats | 364 |
| Wing Luke | 1967 (Note: As South Van Asselt school, renamed for Wing Luke in 1969.) | South Beacon Hill | Dragons | 321 |

=== Grades K–8 Schools ===
| School | Est. (Note: Denotes original date of establishment of the school, changes in name and/or location noted in corresponding footnote) | Location (Note: Denotes location of school by Seattle neighborhood, does not necessary correspond with attendance area) | Nickname | Spring 2023 Enrollment |
|---|---|---|---|---|
| Catharine Blaine | 1998 | Magnolia | Tigers | 460 |
| Louisa Boren STEM | 2012 | Delridge | | 490 |
| Broadview-Thomson | 2008 | Broadview | Bulldogs | 567 |
| Cascade Parent Partnership | | Queen Anne | | 327 |
| Hazel Wolf | 2009 | Pinehurst, Seattle | Wolves | 720 |
| Licton Springs | 2014 | Licton Springs, Seattle | | 118 |
| ORCA | 1989 | Columbia City | | 392 |
| Pathfinder | 1994 | Delridge | | 465 |
| Salmon Bay | 1999 | Ballard | Panthers | 660 |
| South Shore | | Rainier Beach | Sea Dragons | 607 |
| TOPS | 1976 | Eastlake | Falcons | 478 |

Ref:

=== Middle Schools, Grades 6–8 ===
| School | Est. (Note: Denotes original date of establishment of the school, changes in name and/or location noted in corresponding footnote) | Location (Note: Denotes location of school by Seattle neighborhood, does not necessary correspond with attendance area) | Nickname | Spring 2023 Enrollment |
|---|---|---|---|---|
| Denny | 1952 (Note: Refounded as an "international" middle school in 2011.) | West Seattle | Dolphins | 808 |
| Eckstein | 1950 | Bryant/Wedgwood | Eagles | 1,048 |
| Hamilton | 1927 | Wallingford | Hawks | 927 |
| Aki Kurose | 1952 | Columbia City | Peace Cranes | 773 |
| Jane Addams | 2014 | Wedgwood | Jaguars | 881 |
| Madison | 1929 | West Seattle | Bulldogs | 985 |
| McClure | 1964 | Queen Anne | Mavericks | 427 |
| Meany | 1902 | Capitol Hill | Mountain Lions | 506 |
| Mercer | 1957 | Beacon Hill | Mustangs | 850 |
| Robert Eagle Staff | 2017 | Licton Springs | Ravens | 685 |
| Washington | 1978 | Central District | Junior Huskies | 558 |
| Whitman | 1959 | Blue Ridge | Wildcats | 677 |

=== High Schools, Grades 9–12 ===
| School | Est. (Note: Denotes original date of establishment of the school, changes in name and/or location noted in corresponding footnote) | Location (Note: Denotes location of school by Seattle neighborhood, does not necessary correspond with attendance area) | Nickname | Spring 2023 Enrollment |
|---|---|---|---|---|
| Ballard | 1903 (Note: Opened as Ballard School in 1889. Joined Seattle schools in 1907.) | Ballard | Beavers | 1,591 |
| The Center School | 2001 | Lower Queen Anne (Seattle Center) | Dragons | 226 |
| Chief Sealth | 1957 | West Seattle | Seahawks | 1,222 |
| Cleveland | 1927 | Beacon Hill | Eagles | 900 |
| Franklin | 1912 | Mount Baker | Quakers | 1,220 |
| Garfield | 1920 | Central District | Bulldogs | 1,604 |
| Lincoln | 1907 | Wallingford | Lynx | 1,649 |
| Middle College | 1990 | Seattle | | 96 |
| Nathan Hale | 1963 | Meadowbrook | Raiders | 1,089 |
| Ingraham | 1959 | Haller Lake | Rams | 1,420 |
| Nova | 1970 | Capitol Hill | | 252 |
| Rainier Beach | 1960 | Rainier Beach | Vikings | 777 |
| Roosevelt | 1922 | Roosevelt | Rough Riders | 1,513 |
| Seattle World School | 2016 | Capitol Hill | Wolves | 210 |
| Alan T. Sugiyama | 2009 (Note: In old South Shore building.) | Rainier Beach | Blue Sharks | 40 |
| West Seattle | 1917 | West Seattle | Wildcats | 1,319 |

== Historic School Properties ==
All of these buildings pictured below are official city landmarks, as are the following past and present schools:

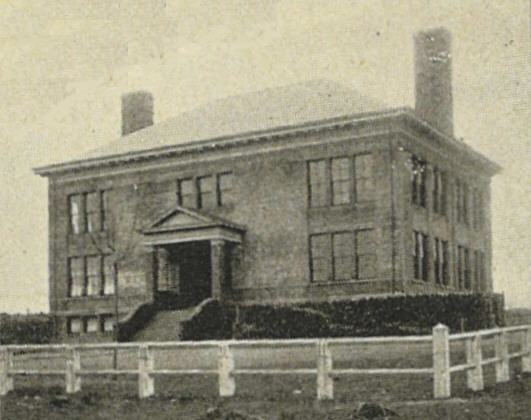
B.F. Day School

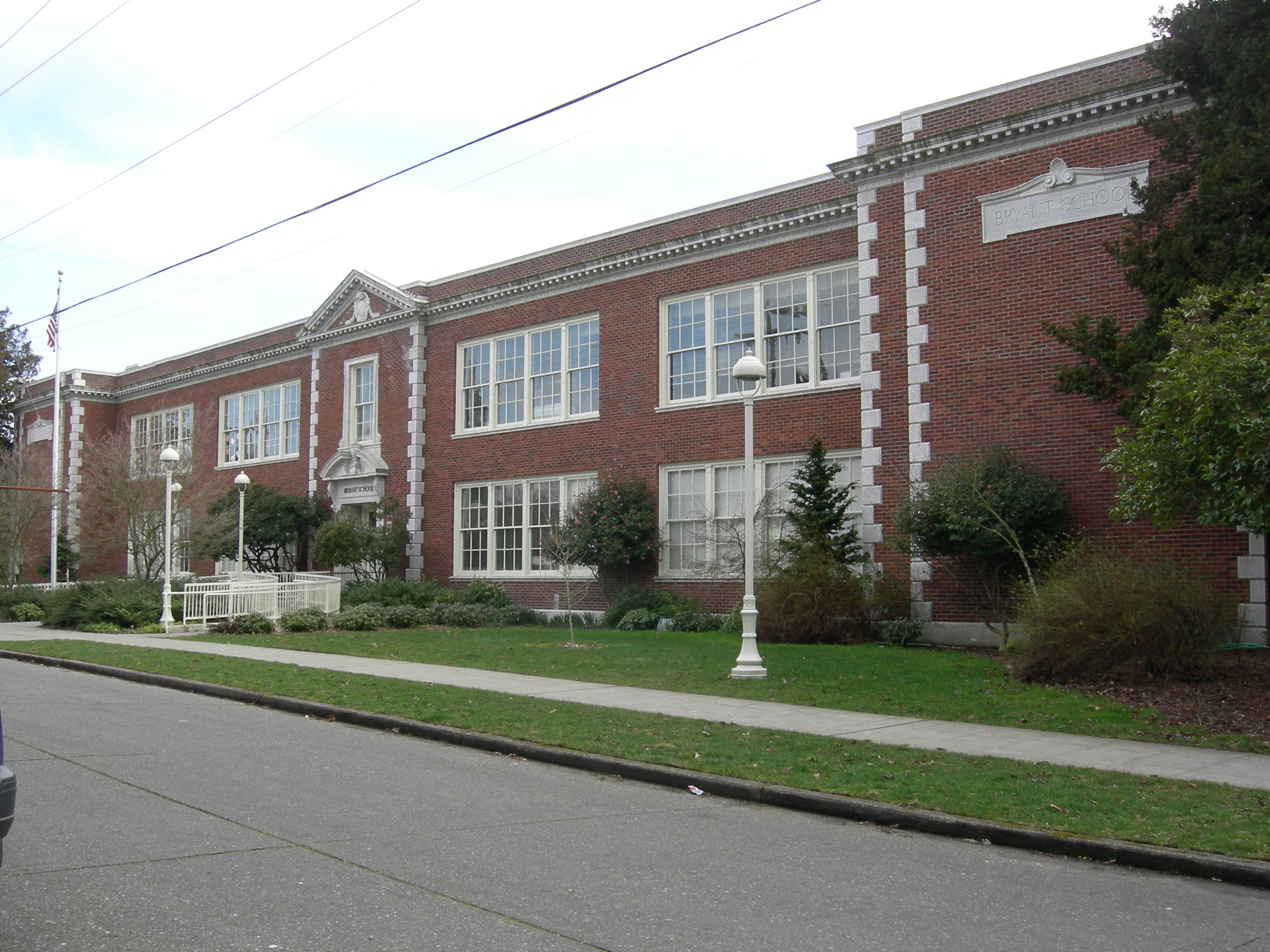
Bryant Elementary School

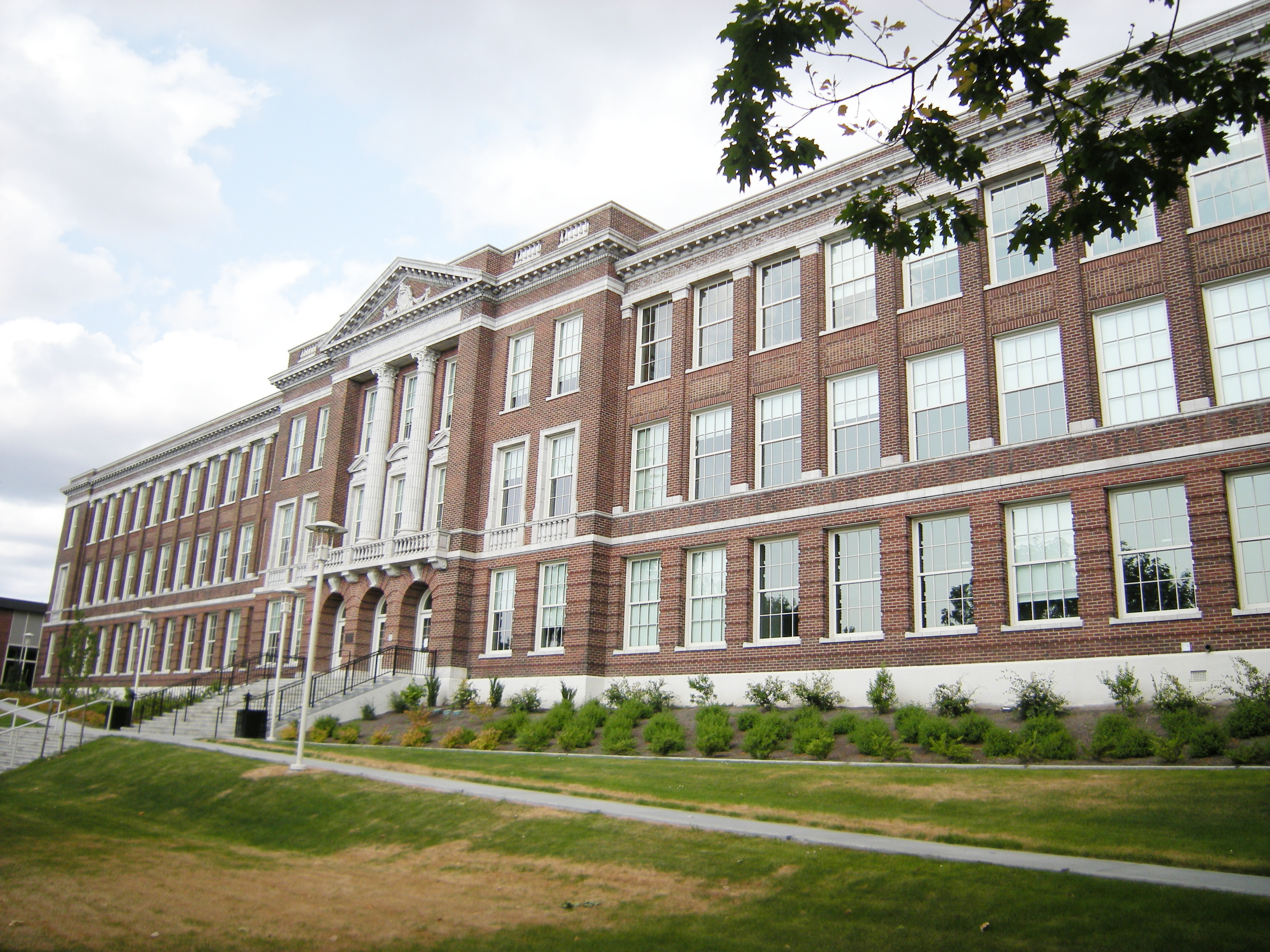
Cleveland High School

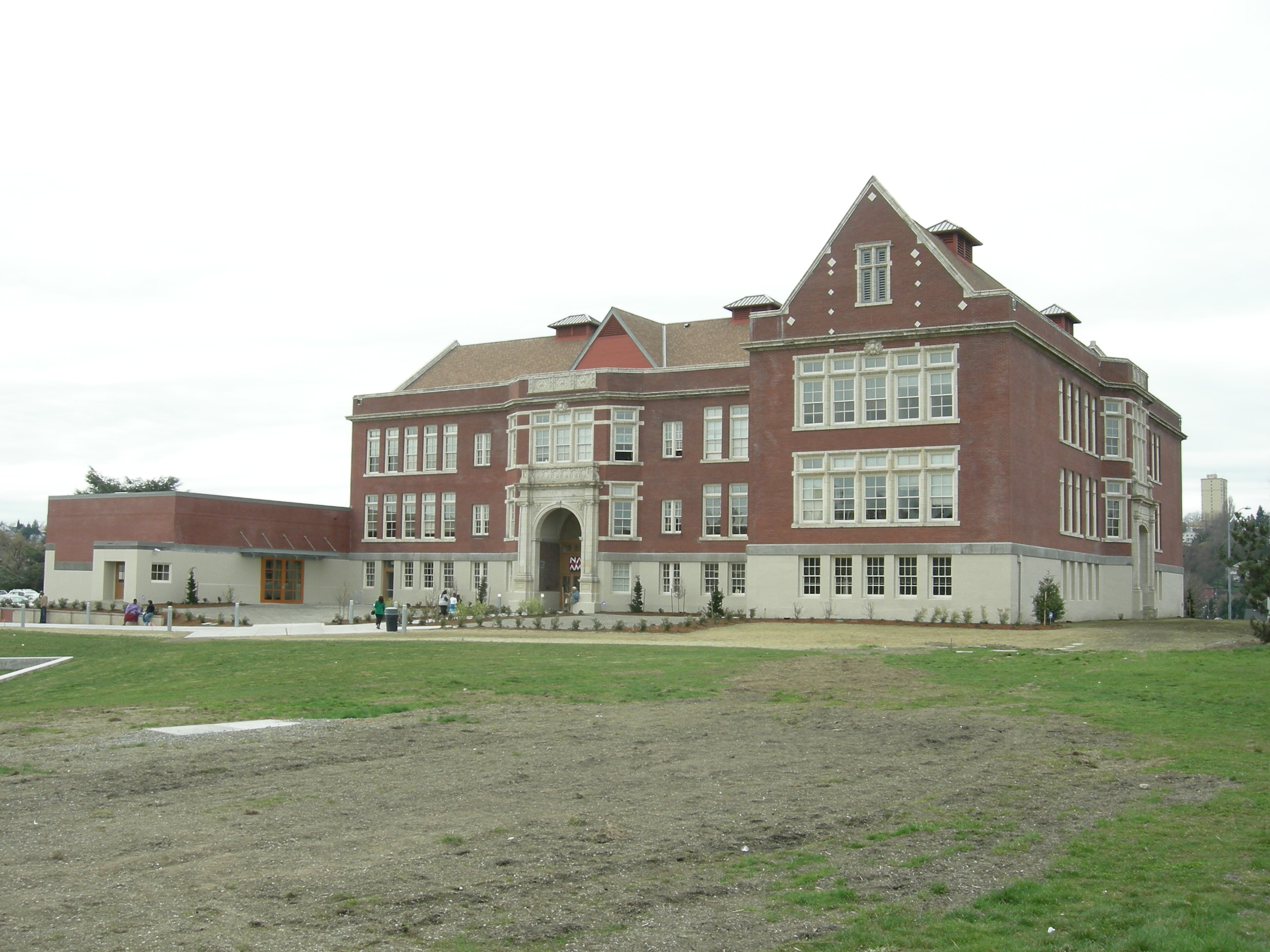
Colman School

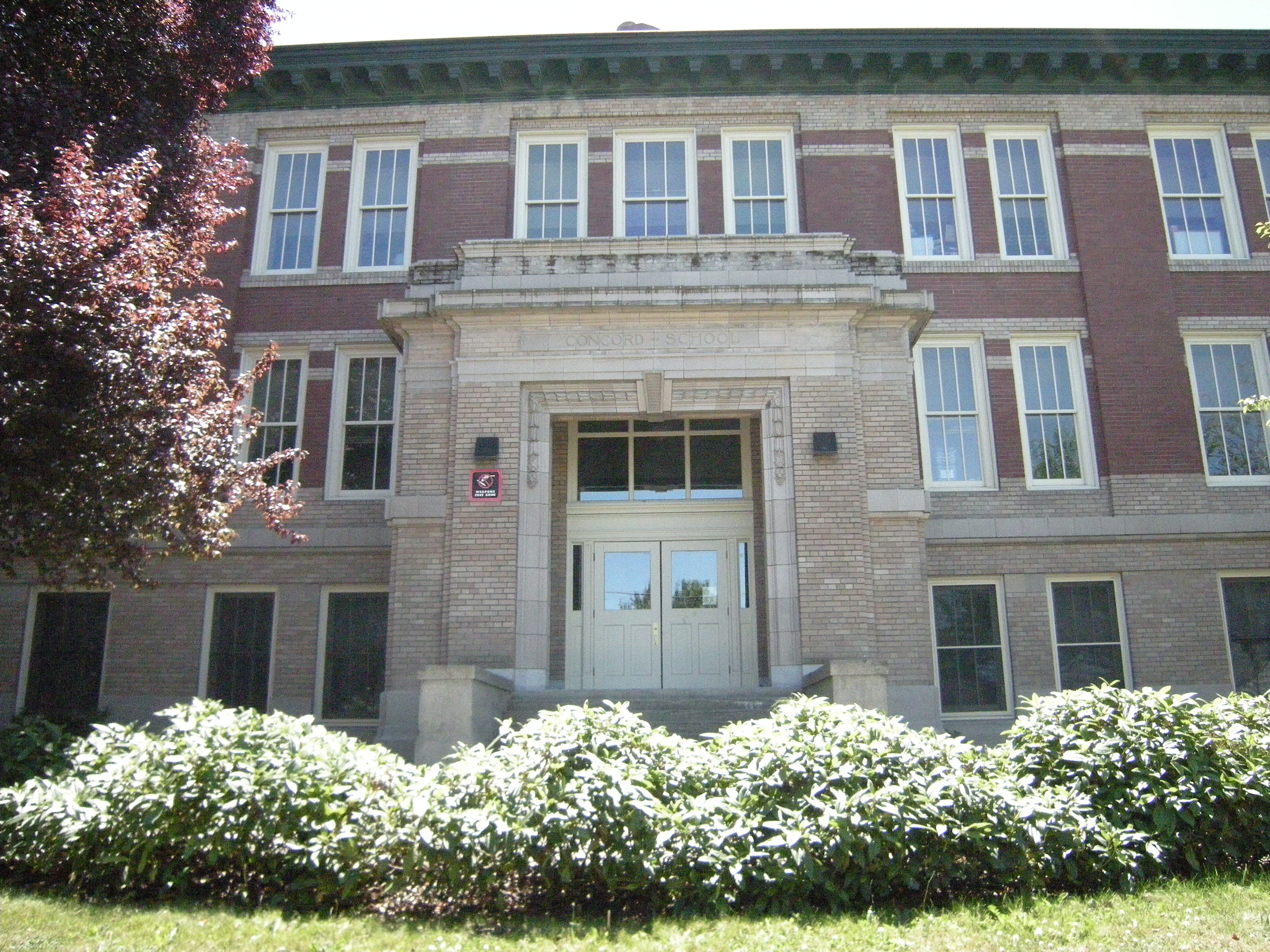
Concord Elementary School

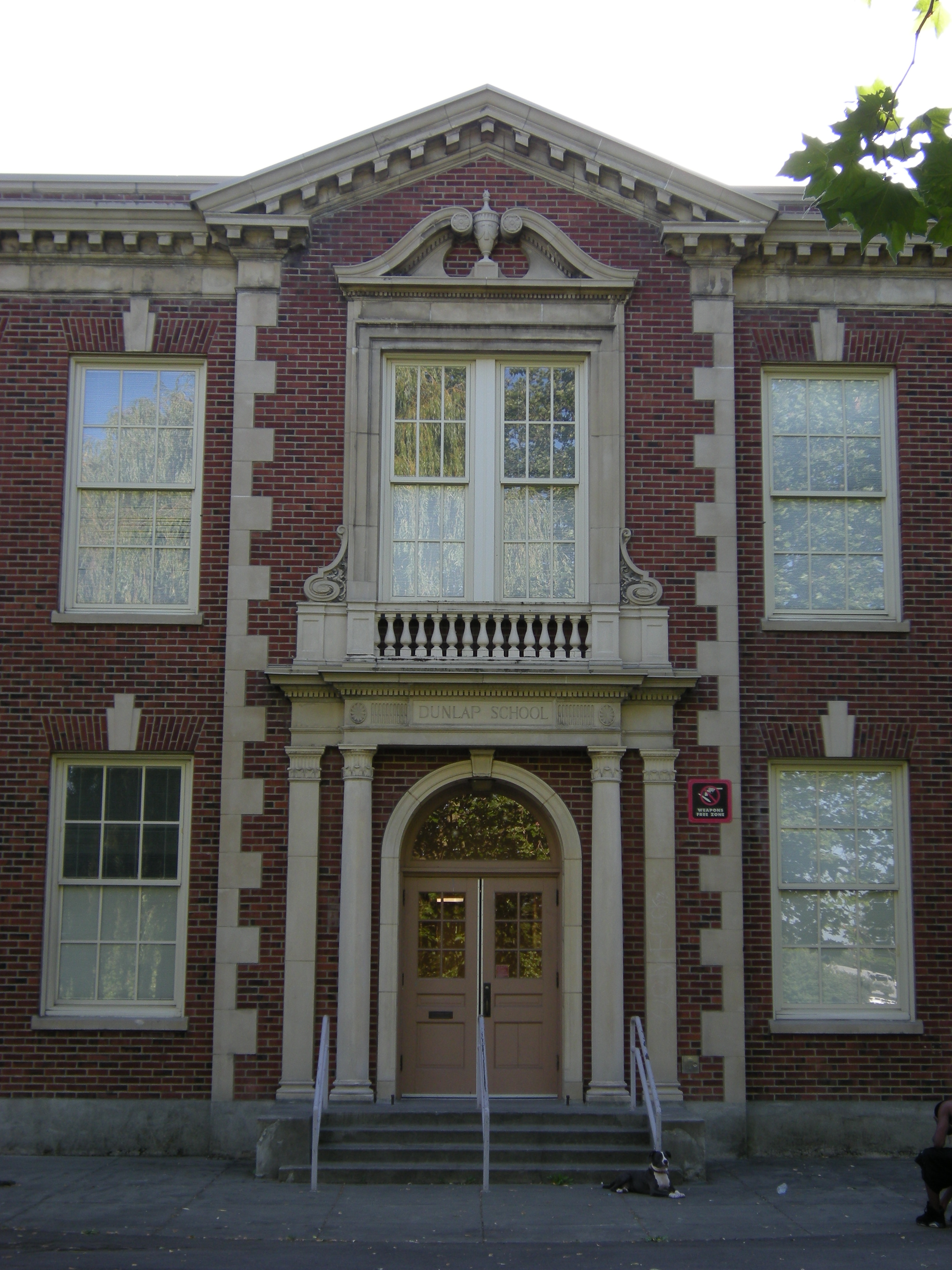
Dunlap Elementary School

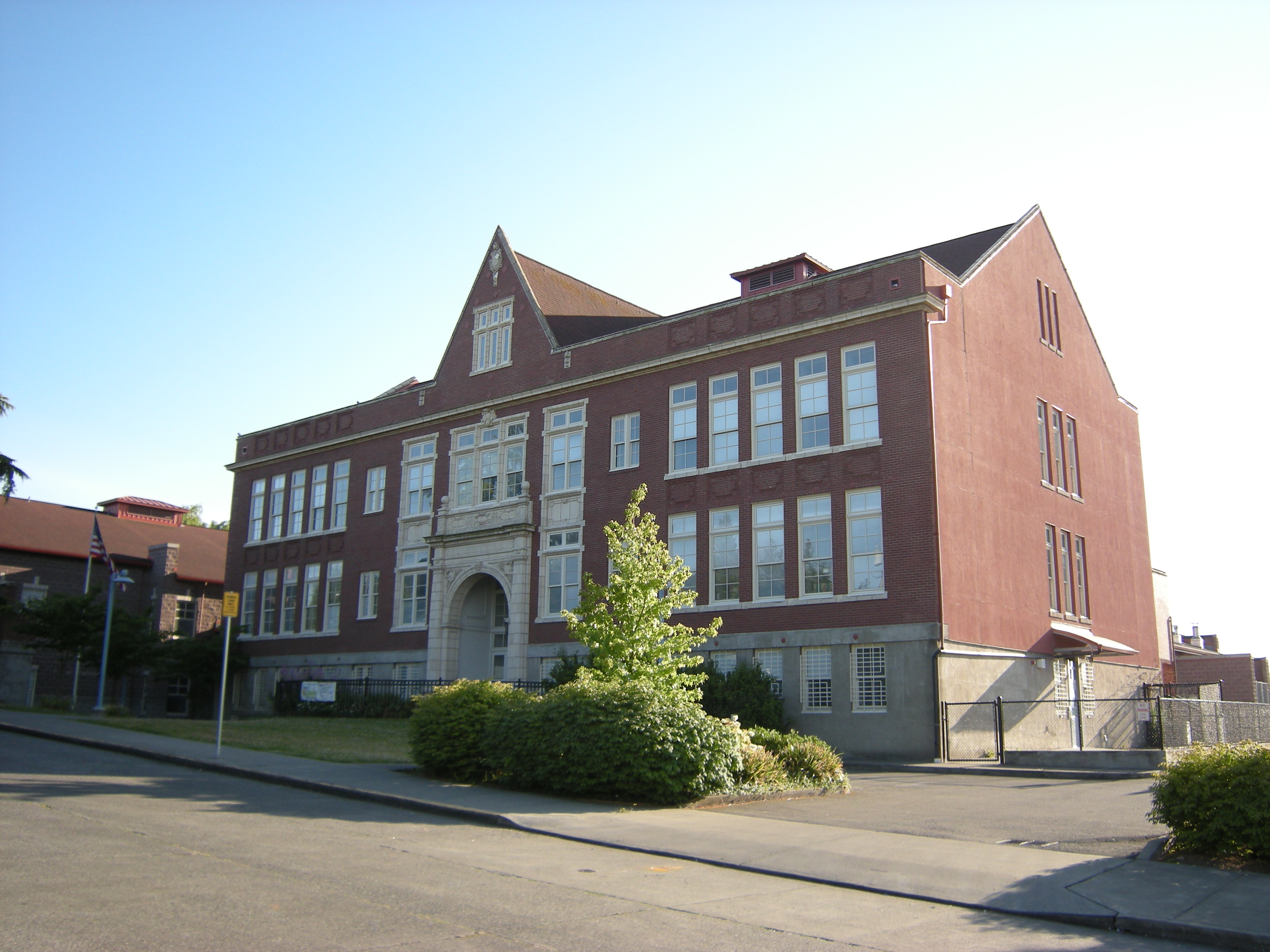
Emerson Elementary School

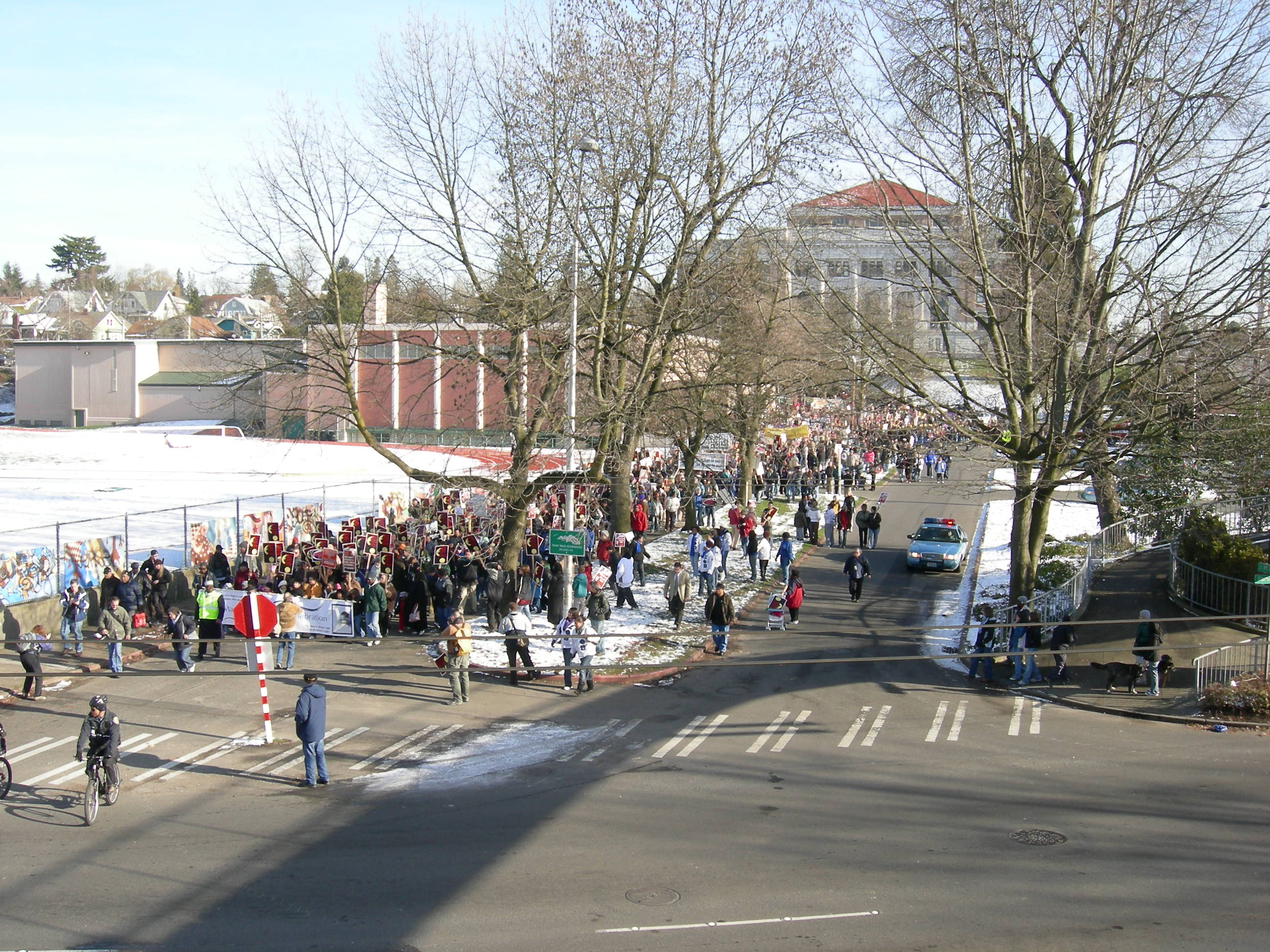
Franklin High School

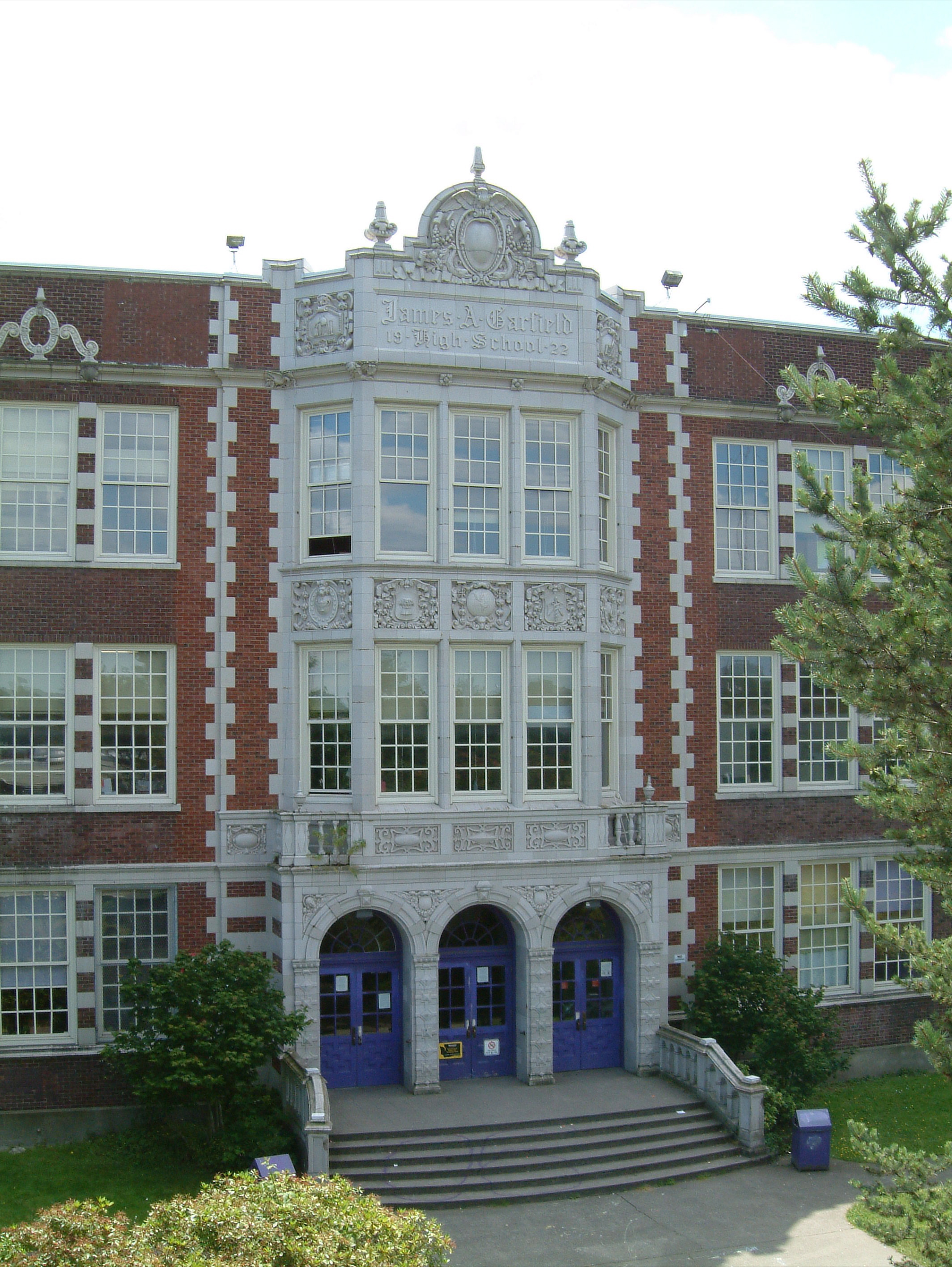
Garfield High School

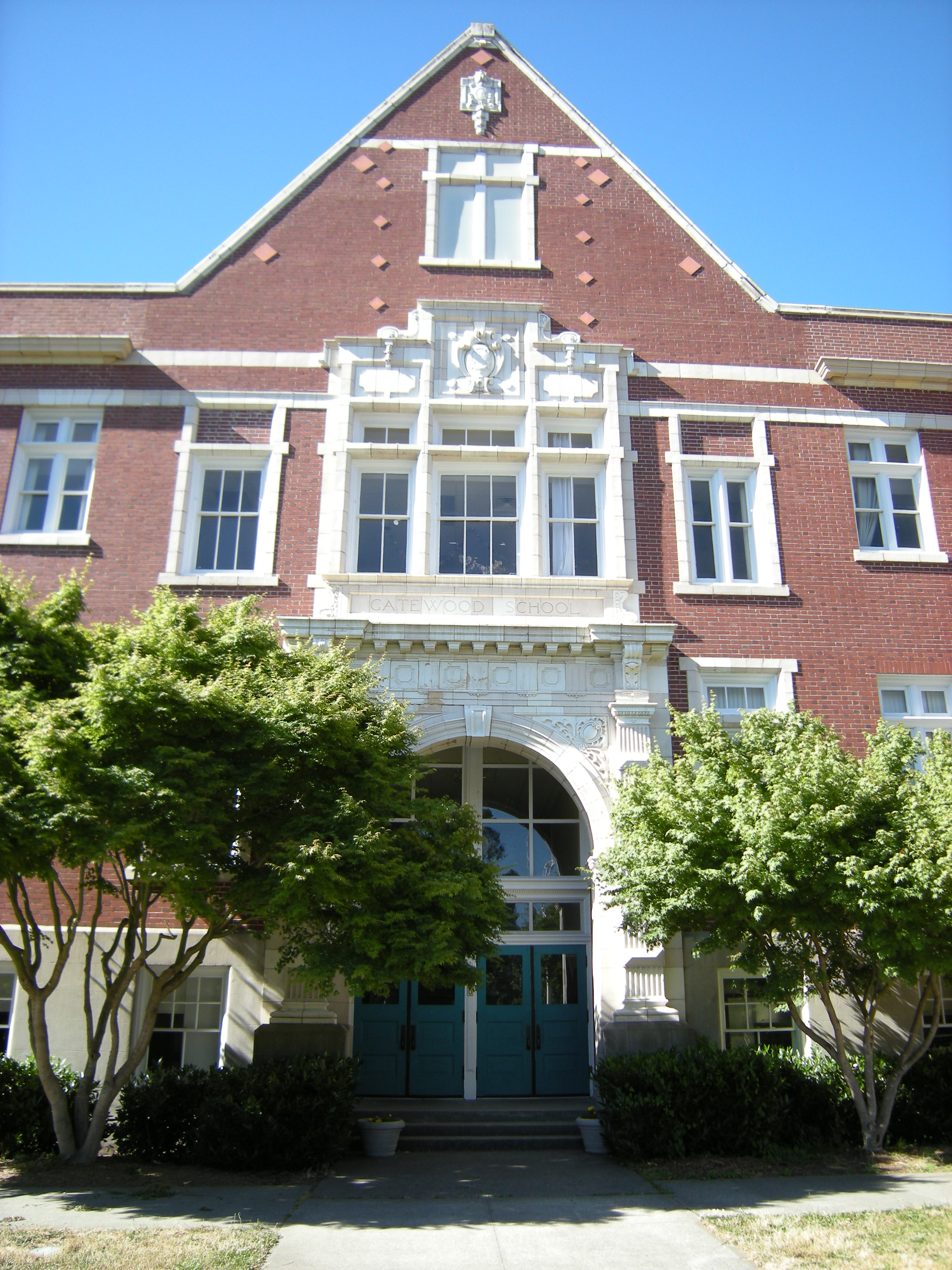
Gatewood School

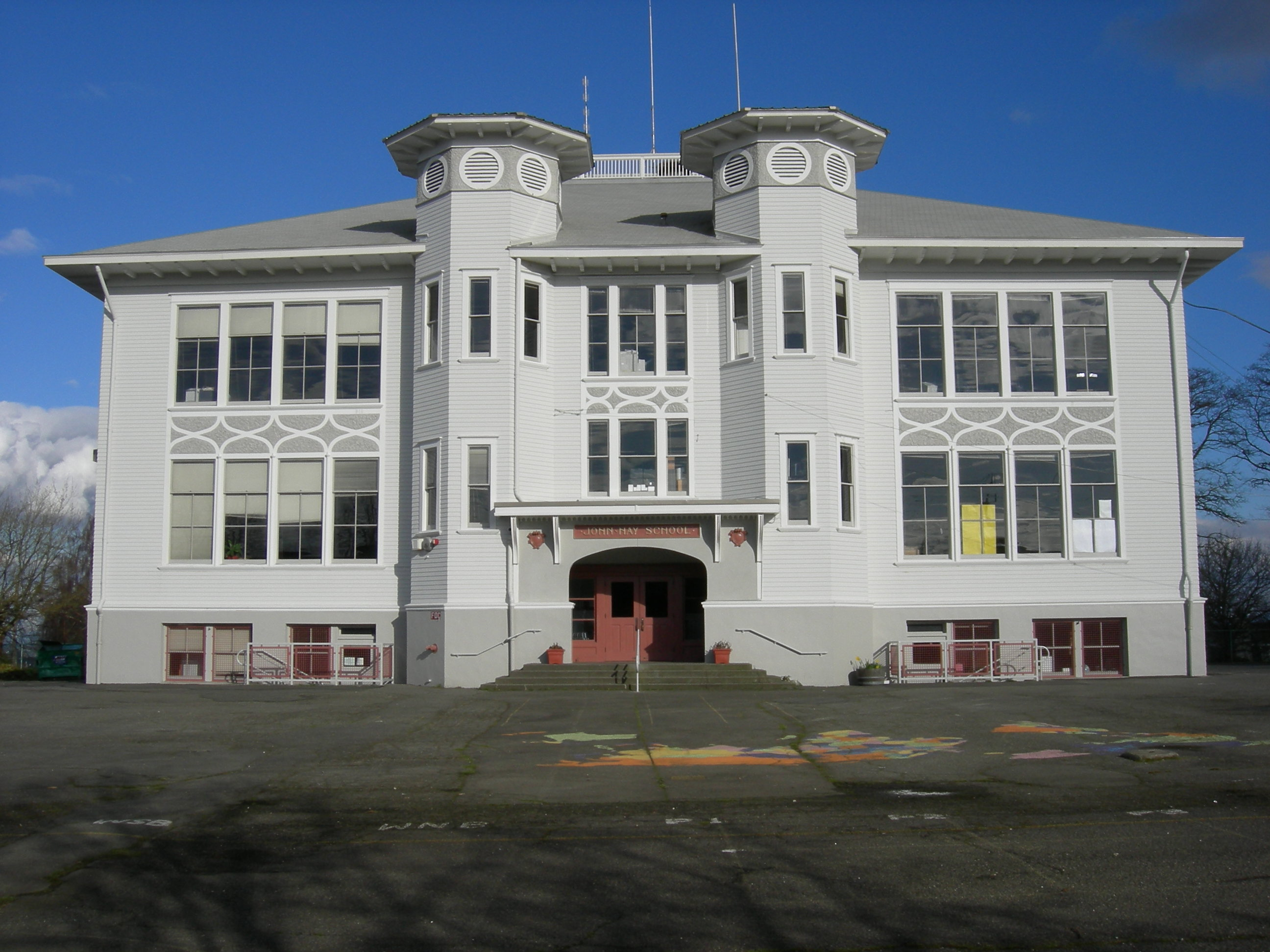
John Hay School

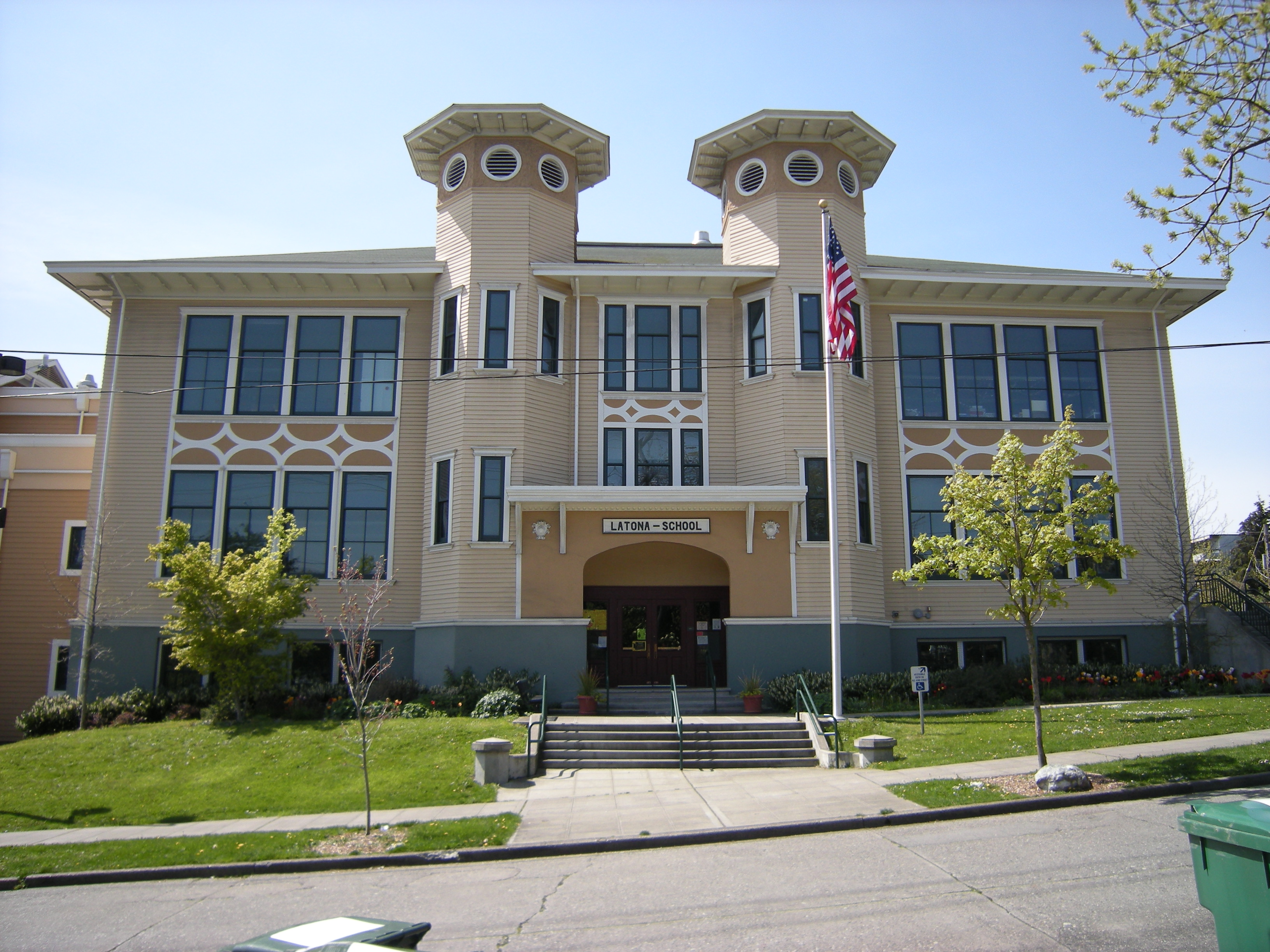
Latona School
(John Stanford International School)

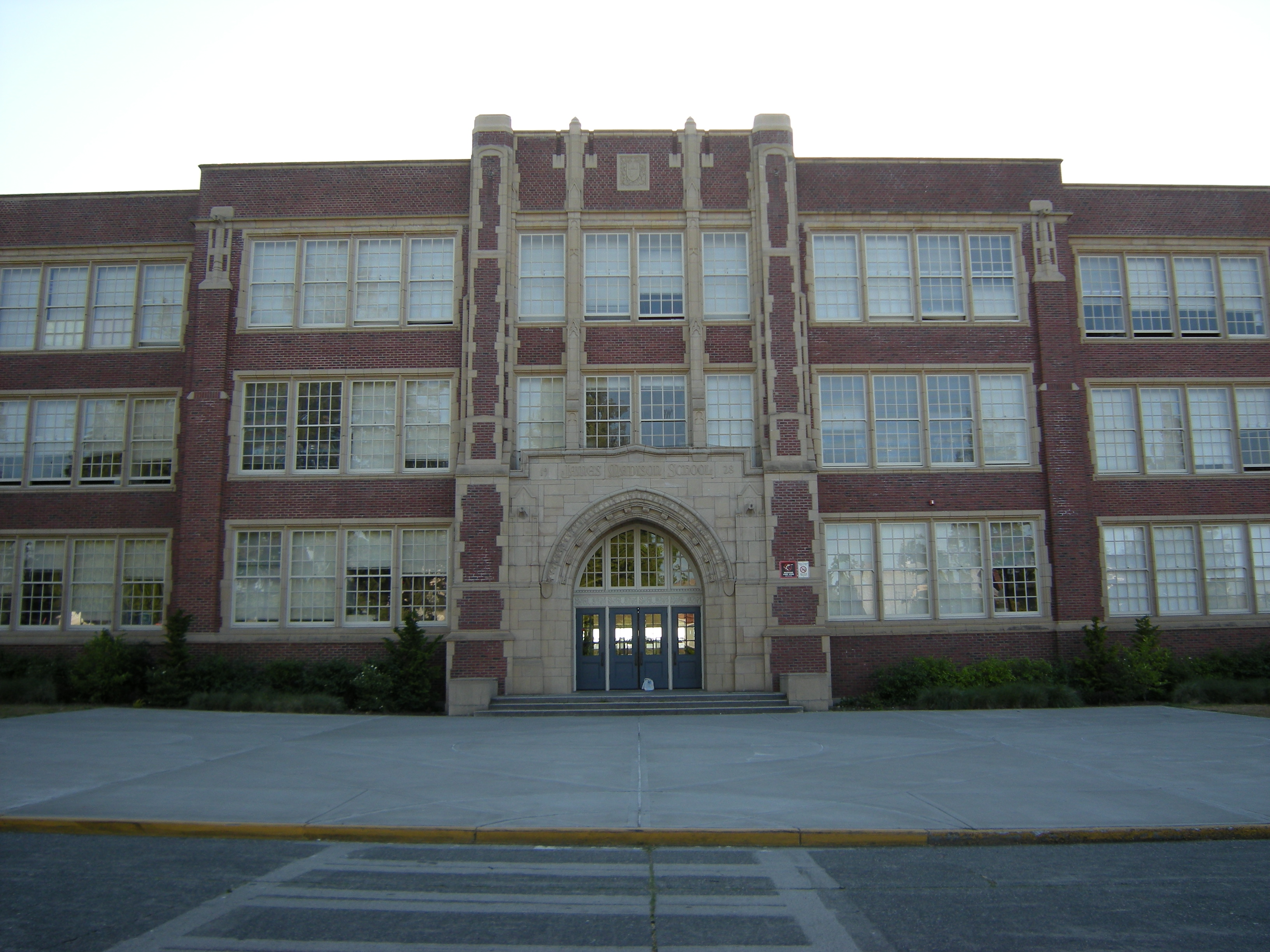
Madison Middle School

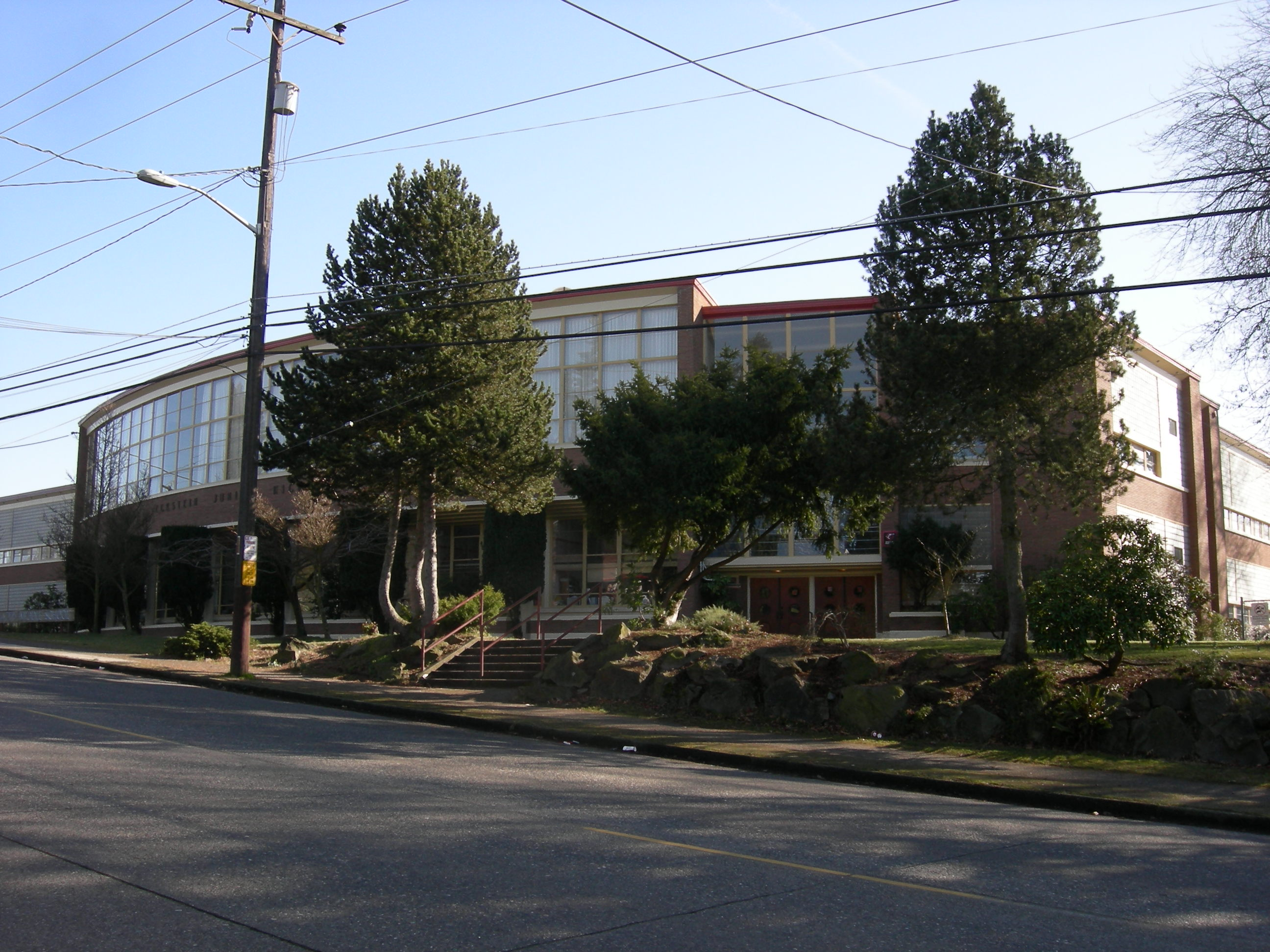
Nathan Eckstein Junior High School

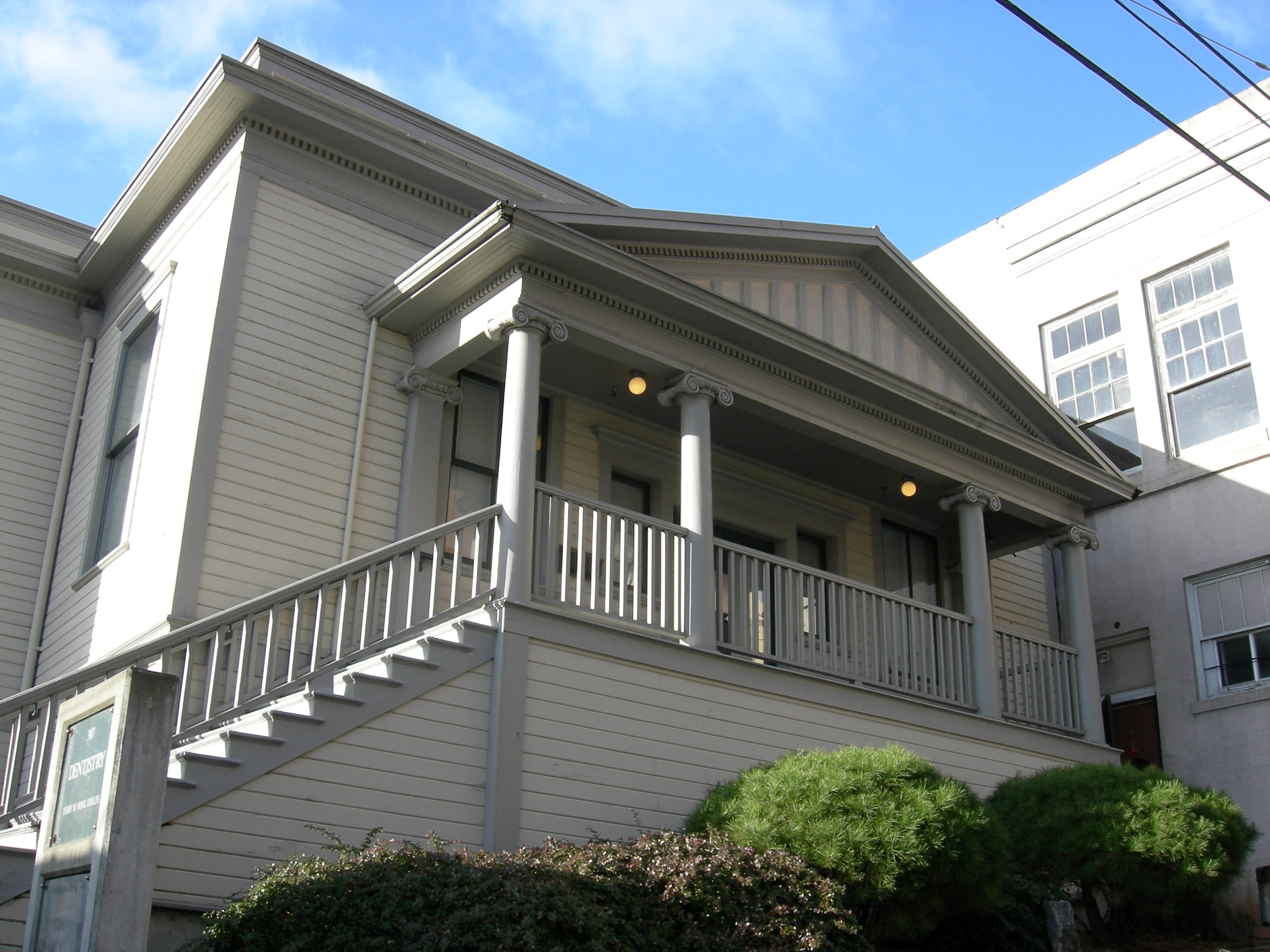
Old Main Street School

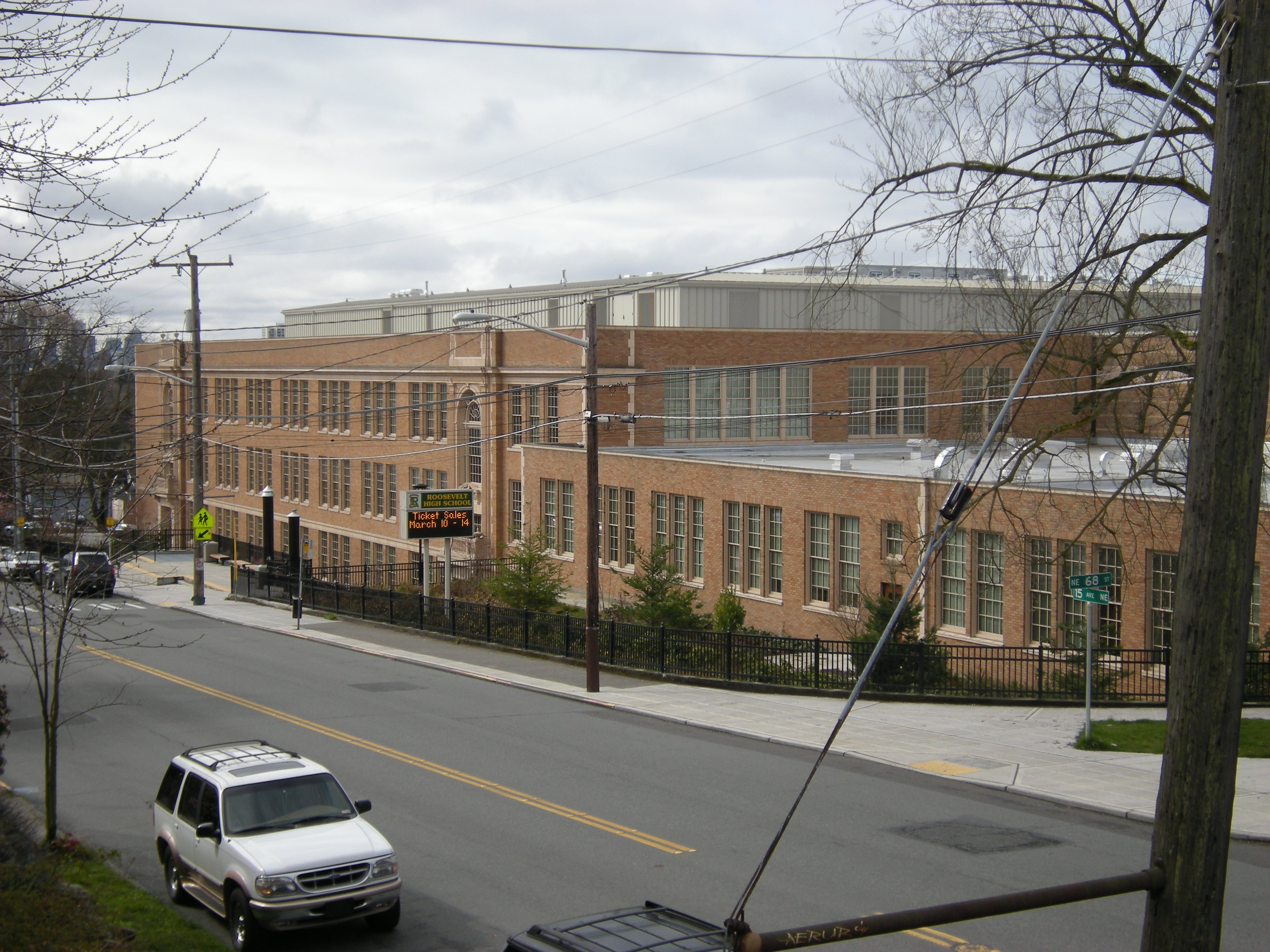
Roosevelt High School

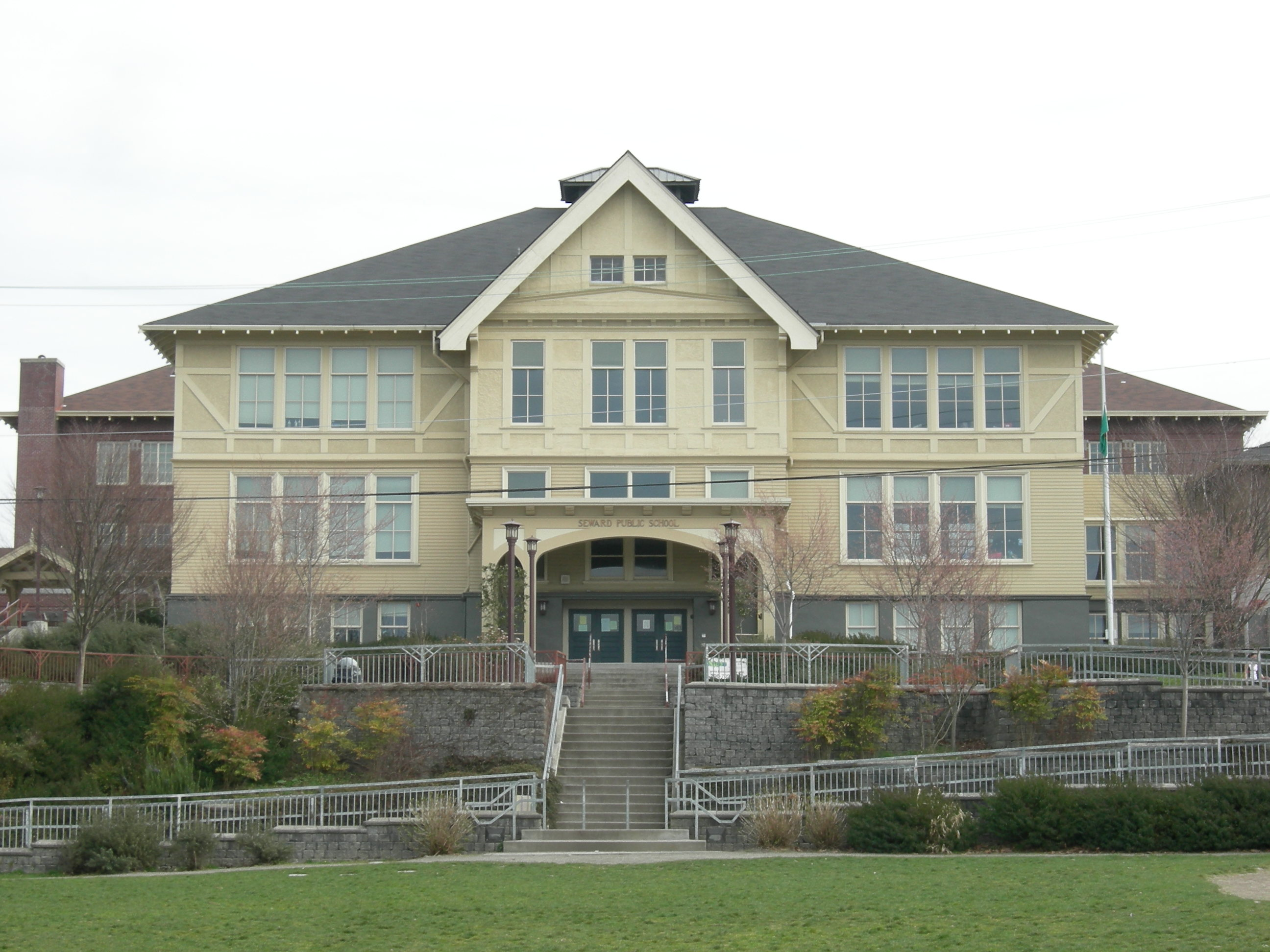
Seward School

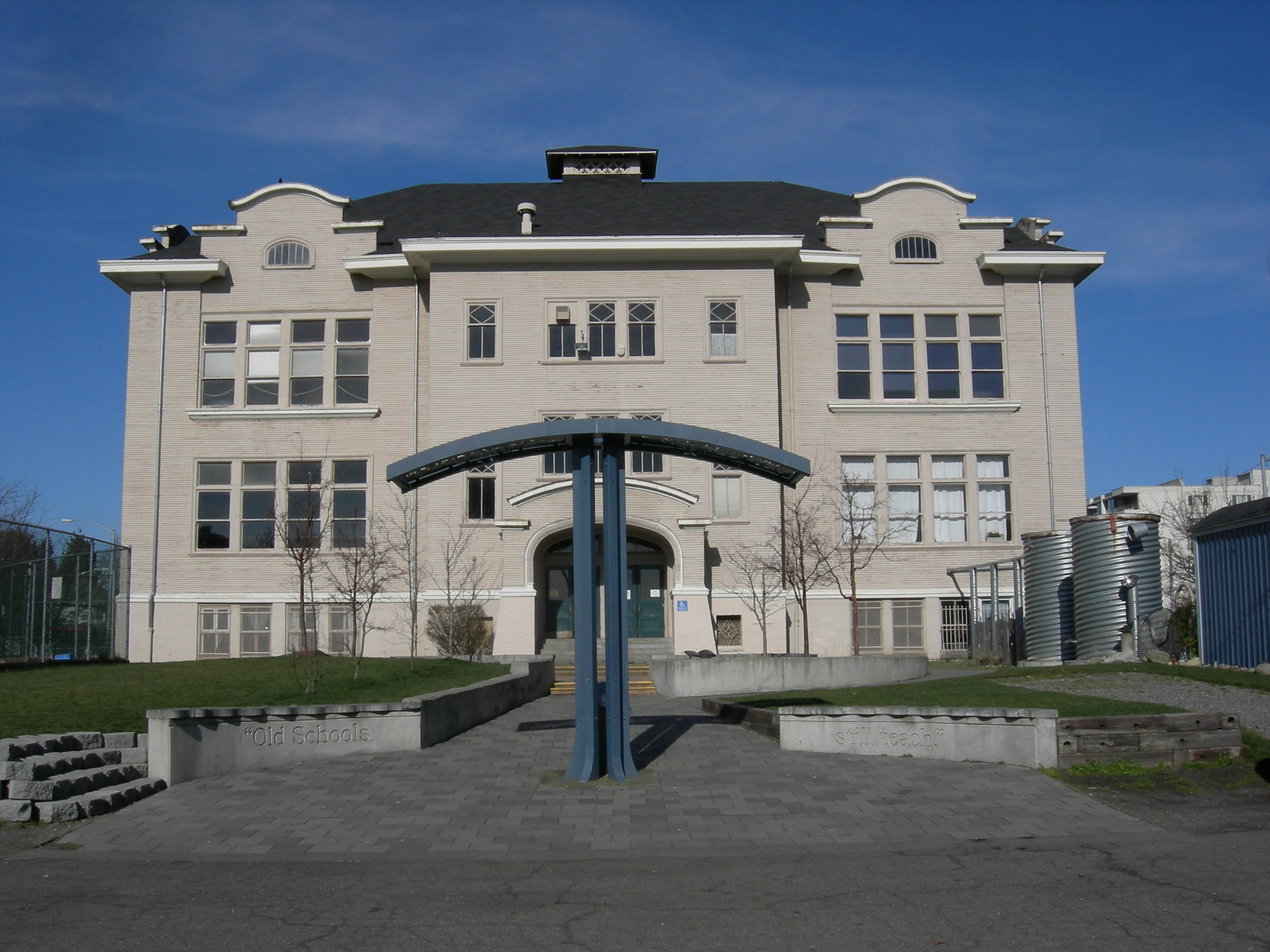
University Heights Elementary School

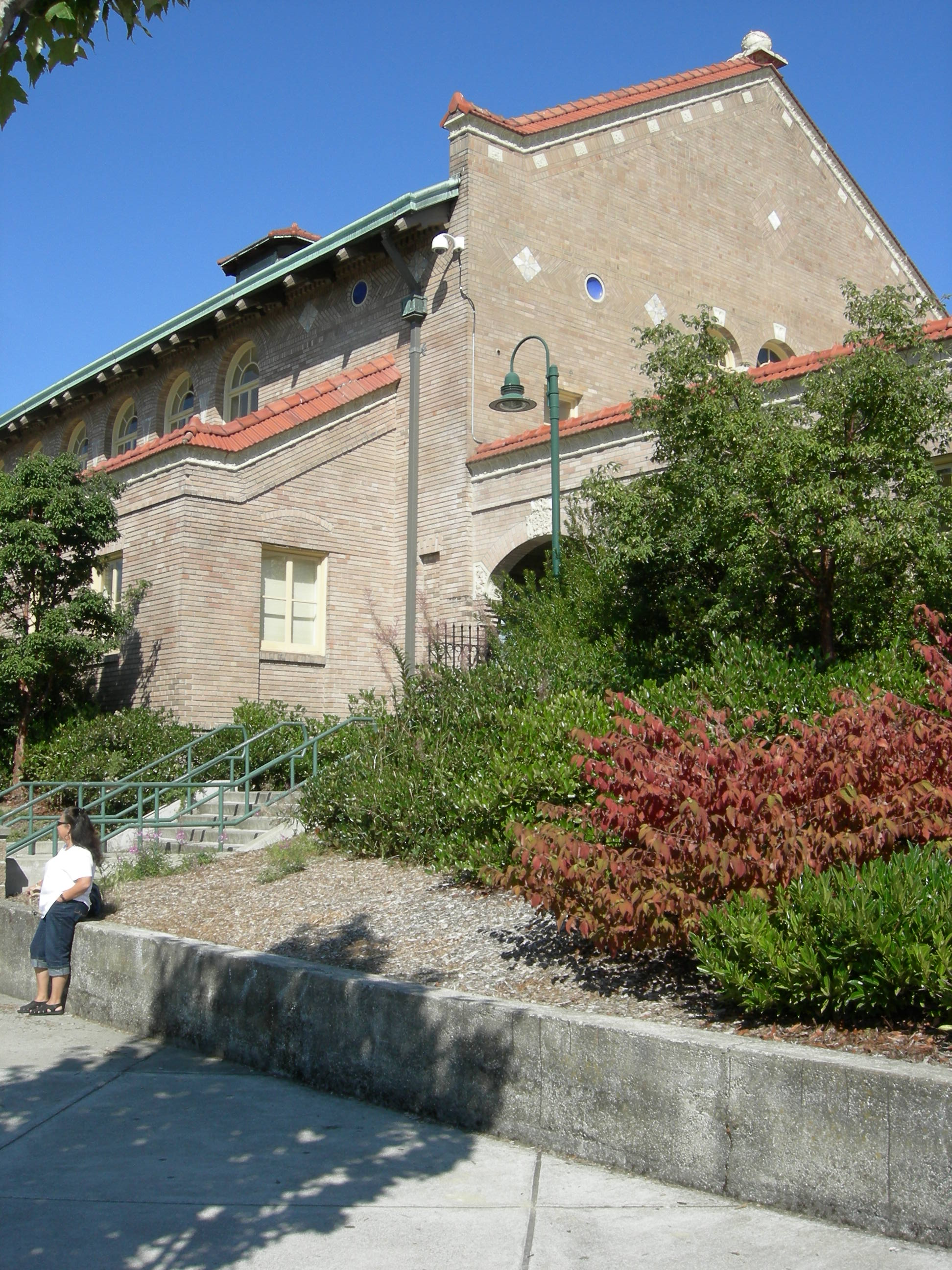
West Seattle High School

== Former schools ==
- Broadway High School, Capitol Hill—closed 1946 after having lost a quarter of its students to the Japanese American internment; became Edison Technical School, incorporated into what is now Seattle Central Community College.
- Queen Anne High School, Queen Anne. Closed 1981. The building survives as a condominium apartment building, and is on the National Register of Historic Places.
- Samuel Gompers High School, 23rd Avenue and Lane Street, 1959–1966, became part of Seattle Central Community College.

Jr. high schools and middle schools previously included in district:

- Jane Addams Jr. High School. Built 1949 as part of the Shoreline School District. Annexed by Seattle 1954. Closed 1984; used since 1985 by Summit K-12. Its excellent auditorium has been used for a variety of purposes, including as a temporary substitute for the University of Washington's Meany Auditorium after the 1965 earthquake and, more recently, by the Civic Light Opera.
- Louisa Boren Jr. High School (1963–1978; then Middle School until 1981). Housed various programs 1981–1989, including Indian Heritage School. Since 1989 it has been used as a temporary site for schools undergoing renovations.
- Model Middle School (1970–1973), antecedent of South Shore Middle School.
- R.H. Thomson Jr. High (1962–1981); the building is now the site of Broadview-Thomson Elementary.
- (Woodrow) Wilson Jr. High. Opened 1953 by Shoreline School District, annexed 1954, added to several times. Became Wilson Middle School 1971. Closed as middle school 1978. Served as Wilson-Pacific School (special education for the mildly disabled) 1978–1989. Then briefly housed COHO Alternative School, and housed American Indian Heritage School 1989–2000, its longest time in one place as of 2007.

Elementary schools previously included in district:

- (John B.) Allen School. Built 1905. Became the Phinney Neighborhood Center 1981.
- Beacon Hill School. Became El Centro de la Raza, 1972.
- Bell Town School. Built 1876. Sold 1884 when the Denny School (see below) opened. Became a private residence, then an apartment/rooming house, eventually torn down.
- Briarcliff School. Opened 1949 as annex to the Magnolia School, became independent 1951. Known as Briarcliff-Hawthorne 1978–1984 after a merger as part of desegregation. Closed 1984.
- Brighton Beach School. Before the opening of the current Brighton Elementary, another school of the same name was opened by the Columbia School District, 1901. Closed 1905 when the Brighton School opened. Annexed with Columbia City 1907 and reopened for one year as Brighton Beach School, an annex to the Brighton School; used again 1916–1922 as Brighton Annex. Removed from site 1943. This site is currently used for Graham Hill Elementary School.
- Broadview School. Opened 1914 by Oak Lake School District. Annexed by Shoreline School District 1944 and then by Seattle 1954. Greatly expanded 1964. Closed 1984, merged into Broadview-Thomson. Demolished in 1989, it is now the site of Ida Culver House-Broadview.
- Cascade School. This school, opened in 1895, closed in 1949 and demolished in 1955, stood at Pontius Avenue N. and Thomas Street in the Cascade neighborhood. Its playfield is now the Cascade Playground.
- Colman School. Built 1909. It is now the Northwest African American Museum, opened March 8, 2008.
- Crown Hill School. Built 1919 as an annex to the Whittier School. Became independent 1942. Addition to building 1949. Closed 1979. As of 2007, home of Small Faces Child Development Center.
- Duwamish Bend School / Holgate School. Opened 1943 in units of the then-new (but short-lived) Duwamish Bend housing project as an annex to the Georgetown School, it acquired a building of its own in 1944. It operated as an independent school 1945–1954 and then one more year as an annex to Georgetown; renamed Holgate in 1952. From 1955, it served in various technical school and special school capacities until 1966 when it became the antecedent of South Seattle Community College, and was torn down once SCCC was completed. The related Holgate Aircraft Branch is still part of SCCC as the Duwamish Industrial Center.
- Fairview School, built 1908, added to 1928, closed 1976, sold 1985. Now Fairview Church and Fairview Christian School (private non-denominational Christian K-8).
- Fauntleroy School, in the Fauntleroy neighborhood of West Seattle. Opened 1906, annexed to Seattle School District in 1908, as West Seattle was annexed in 1907. Operated as an annex to South Seattle School 1908–1910 and Gatewood 1910–1911; destroyed by fire 1911.
- Georgetown School. Built 1900 when Georgetown was still a separate city. Known as Mueller School 1903–1910. Building moved 1907. Annexed (with Georgetown itself) to Seattle 1910, renamed back to Georgetown School. Closed 1971. Used for some alternative school programs and for a community center, before its two separate buildings were torn down in 1981 and 1984, respectively.
- (Nellie) Goodhue School. Opened in 1946 by Shoreline School District as Shoreline Health and Guidance Center. Annexed by Seattle 1954 and used as the Nellie Goodhue School for mentally handicapped children, superseding the Woodhull Hay School (also part of the Shoreline district founded in 1954). Until 1957, was an annex to Northgate, then independent. Closed as a school in 1961, as Seattle Schools integrated special education students. Returned to its role as guidance center / student services building, now known as the Northend Annex.
- Haller Lake School. Founded 1924 as part of Oak Lake School district, repeatedly added to, annexed by Shoreline in 1943 and by Seattle in 1954. Closed 1979, it was soon sold to the private Lakeside School, which used the building until 1999, when it was torn down to be replaced by their new middle school.
- Head of the Bay School was a short-lived school (1890–1892), near the southeast end of Elliott Bay before the dredging and filling that has transformed that area. Never officially a Seattle school, although that area is now part of Seattle.
- E.C. Hughes School. Opened as an unnamed school in portable buildings in Olympic Heights (then known as West Hill) in 1913; named as West Hill School in 1918; moved to permanent site in 1920, as an annex to Gatewood School. In 1926 it was renamed as E.C. Hughes. Operated until 1989, used for storage until 1998, then revived as an interim site while Highland Park Elementary underwent repairs.
- Interbay School, 1903–1939, demolished 1948.
- Interlake School, 1904–1971, then briefly an annex to Lincoln High School. Since 1982, the mixed-use Wallingford Center.
- (Washington) Irving School. Founded 1902 as East Side School in then-independent Ballard. Annexed with Ballard itself, 1907. Renamed Washington Irving 1910. Closed 1915. Reopened as Ballard Special School 1918, renamed Robert Fulton Adjustment School 1929, closed 1932. Used as storehouse until 1937, then WPA offices until 1942, when it was sold.
- Jefferson School, 1912–1979, demolished 1982, now the site of mixed-use Jefferson Square one block southeast of the West Seattle Junction.
- (Martin Luther) King Elementary School. (1913-2007). Merged into T.T. Minor starting with 2007–08 school year due to decreasing enrollment in the district.
  - Previously (until 1974) Harrison School
- Lake City School. Original building opened 1914 in Lake City School District, annexed by Shoreline 1944, building became annex to new Lake City School 1952, annexed to Seattle 1954, closed 1958, demolished, site used for Lake City branch of Seattle Public Library. Second building opened 1931, successively added to, underwent same annexations. Closed 1981, its former playground is now a park and the building itself was remodeled as the Lake City Professional Center.
- Maple Leaf School. There have been three Maple Leaf Schools in what is now Seattle. The first (built 1896, burned around 1910) was along the Seattle, Lake Shore and Eastern Railway (now Burke-Gilman Trail) near Matthews Beach. The other two (1910–1926 and 1926–1979, respectively) were in the neighborhood that retains the name Maple Leaf. Annexed to Shoreline district 1944, to Seattle 1953. The second building was used as a VFW hall for some years and the third as a vo-tech school; both were eventually demolished.
- (Horace) Mann School. Originally Walla Walla School. Originally a 1901 annex to the T.T. Minor School, it soon became a school in its own right. Renamed after Horace Mann in 1921, it remained an elementary school until 1968. It served as the music annex to nearby Garfield High School 1969–1970, and served as the site of the NOVA program until late 2009, when the school relocated to the former Meany Middle School building.
- McDonald School, 1913–1981. Then served as the cradle of what became Bastyr University, and has been used since as an interim site for other schools undergoing renovation. On October 7, 2009 the Seattle School District announced McDonald would reopen, using Lincoln High School as an interim site while renovations are done for the old building, which will be fully operational starting in 2012.
- Mercer School. This building was at Fourth Avenue N. and Valley Street near the base of Queen Anne Hill. Opened in 1890, closed and demolished in 1948, the property is now the site of the Seattle Public Schools administration building.
- North Queen Anne School, opened 1914 as annex to Ross School, independent 1918, expanded 1922, closed 1981. Since then it has been leased to Northwest Center for the Retarded (now just "Northwest Center") for their Child Development Program.
- Olympic School, 1891-1909 grades 1–4 in the Judkins Park neighborhood as an annex to the Rainier School, then used for Special Education 1914–1932. Demolished 1937, site sold by 1940.
- Pacific School, 1896–1946, then as Pacific Prevocational Center (coeducational secondary school for mentally handicapped youngsters) to 1975. Demolished 1977, land is now part of Seattle University. Had Seattle's first fully equipped school gymnasiums (2 of them).
- Pinehurst School: opened 1950 as the K-3 Pinehurst Primary School in the Shoreline School District. Annexed 1953 and renamed Pinehurst Elementary School; physically expanded 1955–6 and became a K-6. Closed 1981. Site of Alternative School #1 since 1984.
- Pontiac School (1890–1926). Originally part of the Yesler School District; Yesler was more or less today's Laurelhurst. Annexed by Seattle 1911.
- Queen Anne School, later West Queen Anne School. This 1890 school (later expanded) between W. Galer (then Gaylor) and W. Lee Streets and between Fifth and Sixth Avenues W. was later known as the West Queen Anne School. The building survives as a condominium apartment building, and is on the National Register of Historic Places.
- Rainier School. This school at 23rd Avenue S. and S. King Street opened in 1891, briefly known as "Lincoln" in 1903, closed as elementary school in 1940, reopened as unit of Edison Technical School in 1943, and finally closed and was demolished in 1943.
- Pleasant Valley School. Opened 1912 as annex to Lawton. Became independent 1922. Closed 1926, superseded by the Magnolia School.
- Rainier View Elementary School. (1954-2007). Merged into Emerson Elementary starting with 2007–08 school year due to decreasing enrollment in the district.
- Rainier Vista School. Built in 1943 with federal funds at the Rainier Vista housing project, which was originally built for Boeing workers during World War II. Leased by Seattle Schools from the outset, purchased 1947. Used as an annex to the Columbia School, it was initially a nursery school and K–1. Ages were gradually expanded, eventually a K–6. Closed 1971, used 1971–2000 for Head Start classes.
- Ravenna School. Two successive schools, mid-1890s–1909 and 1911–1981. The latter is now the Ravenna-Eckstein Community Center (and senior housing).
- Riverside School (1911–1926); one-room schoolhouse; superseded by the Youngstown/Cooper School; the building survives.
- Randell School (1890–1904), predecessor to Madrona School.
- Ross School (1883–1941) operated in two successive locations, both between Fremont and Ballard. The post 1903 location is the site of today's Ross Playfield.
- Salmon Bay School (unrelated to the current school of that name). Founded 1901 as part of the Ballard School District, annexed with Ballard in 1907. Closed as school 1932, used 1938 for WPA sewing classes. Demolished 1945, now site of Ballard Boys and Girls Club.
- Sand Point School (1958–1988). Part of North Seattle Community College since 1990. On October 7, 2009 it was announced that Sand Point Elementary School will be reopening beginning with the 2010–2011 school year.
- Seward School. In the Eastlake neighborhood. Opened 1895. There are three distinct buildings, all extant (though the original building has been moved), and with a rather complicated history of uses; as of 2007, TOPS @ Seward uses these buildings.
- South School / Main Street School. Original building opened as South School 1873, renamed Kindergarten School 1897–1902, then Main Street School (annex to the new South School 1902–1909, briefly known as Mann School in 1903), then used as a temporary relocation site or annex for various schools until 1921. Demolished 1922.
- South Park School. Opened 1902, annexed with South Park 1907. Annex to Concord School after 1914. Closed 1938. Now site of South Park Community Center.
- South Seattle School. Opened 1892 by School District 99 as a successor to Head of the Bay School. Annexed to Seattle 1905. Closed 1932. Site is now South Seattle Playground.
- Summit School (1905–1965). The building functioned 1965–1973 as an annex to Seattle Central Community College; then for three years it housed the alternative school that still bears its name, and offshoot of the NOVA program. In 1977 it was sold and converted to use as offices; the same year, it was listed on the NRHP. The building was sold again in 1980, and since that time has housed the Northwest School, a private preparatory school.
- University Heights School. Opened 1902; briefly known as Morse School in 1903; from 1974, Alternative Elementary School #2 used two-thirds of the building; exteriors declared city landmark 1977; closed 1989, with the alternative school moving to the Decatur School. Since 1990 it is the University Heights Community Center.
- Viewlands Elementary (1954-2007). Merged into Broadview-Thomson Elementary starting with 2007–08 school year due to decreasing enrollment in the district.
- Warren Avenue School (1903–1959). Briefly known in 1903 as Edwards School. The school became a pioneer in programs for physically handicapped students, notably those with cerebral palsy, but also the hearing impaired, blind, etc. Closed to make way for the Century 21 Exposition: the site is now the KeyArena.
- Webster School. Opened 1903 as Bay View School by Ballard School District. Annexed with Ballard itself in 1907. Moved to new building January 1908 and renamed in honor of Daniel Webster in March. Closed 1979; briefly leased by a motion picture producer (during which time it was seriously damaged by a fire); now the site of the Nordic Heritage Museum, which is seeking to move to a Market Street, Ballard site as of 2007.
- Wetmore School. Opened 1903 or earlier by the Columbia School District. Annexed with Columbia City in 1907. After 1910 it became the gymnasium of the York School (later renamed after John Muir, and still open as of 2007). It was used in that capacity until 1959, when the former Wetmore School took on the name "York School" and was used for manual training, before becoming a gym again 1973–1989. Demolished 1989.
- (Reverend George F.) Whitworth Elementary School. (1908-2007). Merged into Dearborn Park Elementary starting with 2007–08 school year due to decreasing enrollment in the district.
- Yesler School (1892–1918). Originally part of the Yesler School District; as noted above, Yesler was more or less today's Laurelhurst. Annexed by Seattle 1911.

== Other properties previously included in district ==
- Parental Home for Girls / Girls' Parental School / Martha Washington School. Two successive locations. The first (1914–1921), in the Ravenna-Bryant neighborhood, was later the similar but privately operated Ruth School for Girls and then the Medina Baby Home; sold 1945. The second was at Brighton Beach on Lake Washington, at the site of what was already a similar, privately run facility. From 1921 to 1957 it was part of Seattle Public Schools; renamed Martha Washington 1931; passed under state control in 1957, and was closed as a residential school in 1965. The building was later used by a series of alternative schools and a Montessori academy before being demolished in 1989. Its archway was relocated to Green Lake Park in June, 2009.
- Parental School / Parental Home for Boys / (Luther) Burbank School for Boys. Opened 1905 as Parental School; "for Boys" added 1914 when Parental Home for Girls was established; renamed after Luther Burbank 1931; passed under state control in 1957, and was closed as a residential school in 1965. Located on Mercer Island, outside of city limits. The location is now Luther Burbank Park; several buildings and other remnants survive.
- School for the Deaf. Founded at Longfellow School 1907(?) and remained there until 1912. At Washington School 1912–1921. Then at T.T. Minor School through 1939 when it was divided out to Summit, Longfellow again, and (John) Marshall (then a junior high school; program there may have begun later, in 1942). The program at Summit moved to University Heights in 1960. Eventually, not treated as a separate "school". The current program for deaf elementary and middle school students is at TOPS.

== Sources ==
- Thompson, Nile; Marr, Carolyn (2002), Building for learning - Seattle Public Schools Histories, 1862-2000, Seattle: Seattle Public Schools, archived from the original on June 3, 2009 As of 2018, all of the chapters are available as HTML on HistoryLink, but they do not provide a table of contents; chapters can be found via https://www.google.com/search?&q=site%3AHistorylink.org+%22Building+for+Learning%22
