= Mercer Middle School =

Mercer Middle School is the name of several schools in the United States:

- Asa Mercer Middle School, a school of the Seattle School District in Seattle, Washington
- Mercer Middle School, in the Savannah-Chatham County Public Schools in Garden City, Georgia
- Mercer Middle School, in the Loudoun County Public Schools in Aldie, Virginia
