= Northwest Christian High School =

Northwest Christian High School can refer to:

- Northwest Christian High School (Arizona), Phoenix, Arizona, U.S.
- Northwest Christian High School (Bakersfield, California), U.S., a member of the Central Sierra League
- Northwest Christian High School (Lacey, Washington), U.S.
