= Northwest High School =

Northwest High School or North West High School may refer to:

All of the following are in the United States:

- Northwest High School (Indiana), Indianapolis, Indiana
- Northwest High School (Louisiana), Opelousas, Louisiana
- Northwest High School (Maryland), Germantown, Maryland
- Northwest High School (Michigan), Jackson, Michigan
- Northwest High School (Missouri), Cedar Hill, Missouri
- Northwest High School (Grand Island, Nebraska)
- Northwest High School, Shiprock, New Mexico, operated by Shiprock Associated Schools, Inc.
- Northwest High School (Stark County, Ohio)
- Northwest High School (Hamilton County, Ohio)
- Northwest High School (McDermott, Ohio), U.S.
- Northwest High School (Tennessee), Clarksville, Tennessee
- Northwest High School (Texas), in Fort Worth, Texas (Justin postal address)

== Similar high school names ==
All of the following are in the United States:

- Blue Valley Northwest High School, in Overland Park, Kansas
- Northwest Cabarrus High School, in Kannapolis, North Carolina
- Northwest Catholic High School, in West Hartford, Connecticut
- Northwest Christian High School (Arizona), in Phoenix, Arizona
- Northwest Christian High School (Bakersfield, California), a member of the Central Sierra League
- Northwest Christian High School (Lacey, Washington)
- Northwest Classen High School, in Oklahoma City, Oklahoma
- Northwest Guilford High School, in Guilford County, North Carolina
- Northwest Rankin High School, in Flowood, Mississippi
- Northwest Whitfield High School, in Whitfield County, Georgia
- Northwest Yeshiva High School, in Mercer Island, Washington
- Olathe Northwest High School, in Olathe, Kansas
- Omaha Northwest High School, in northwest Omaha, Nebraska
- Shawnee Mission Northwest High School, in Shawnee, Kansas
- Wichita Northwest High School, in Wichita, Kansas

== See also ==
- Northwestern High School (disambiguation)
- Northwest School (disambiguation)
