= Northwest Middle School =

Northwest Middle School can refer to one of the following schools:

- Northwest Middle School, a public school in Indianapolis, Indiana, operated by Indianapolis Public Schools
- Northwest Middle School, a public school in Tanetown, Maryland, operated by Carroll County Public Schools
- Northwest Middle and High School, a tribal school in Shiprock, New Mexico, operated by Shiprock Associated Schools, Inc.
- Northwest Middle School, a public school in Reading, Pennsylvania, operated by the Reading School District
- Northwest Middle School, a public school in Travelers Rest, South Carolina, operated by Greenville County Schools
