= Bassetti Architects =

American architectural firm

Practice information
- Firm type: Historic Preservation; Historic School Design; Sustainable design Educational Programming; Interior Design; Master Planning
- Key architects: Lorne McConachie, FAIA; Dan Miles, AIA; Caroline Lemay AIA; Michael Davis, AIA; Jordan Kiel, AIA, DBIA; Kristian Kicinski, AIA, LEED AP BD+C, WELL AP; Joe Echeverri, AIA, LEED AP BD+C
- Founded: 1947
- No. of employees: 66
- Location: Seattle, Washington, United States
- Coordinates: 47.602684°N 122.336091°W

Website
- bassettiarch.com

Bassetti Architects is an architectural firm based in Seattle, Washington with a second office in Portland, Oregon. Founded in 1947, the firm has newly designed or substantially renovated several well-known Seattle landmarks and many schools in the greater Seattle-Tacoma area. This includes several buildings at the Pike Place Market, the Jackson Federal Building, Seattle City Hall, the Seattle Aquarium, Franklin High School, Raisbeck Aviation High School, Roosevelt High School, and Stadium High School. The firm's work has been awarded local, national, and international awards.

== History ==
Bassetti Architects was founded in 1947 by Fred Bassetti. Prior to his retirement in 1991, the firm operated under different names reflecting changes in ownership: Fred Bassetti Architect, Bassetti & Morse, Fred Bassetti & Co., Bassetti Norton Metler Architects, Bassetti/Norton/Metler/Rekevics Architects, and since 1994 as Bassetti Architects.

== Current principals ==
Current Principals include Caroline Lemay, Lorne McConachie, Dan Miles, Michael Davis, Jordan Kiel, and Joe Echeverri, and Associate Principals Kristian Kicinski, Amanda Hohen, Lydia Burns and Judy Yeoh. Lorne McConachie is co-author of the book Architecture for Achievement - Building Patterns for Small School Learning.

== Projects ==
Seattle Landmarks

- Henry M. Jackson Federal Building
- Pike Place Market buildings: Post Alley Market, Sanitary Public Market, Silver Oakum Building, Triangle Market.
- Seattle Aquarium
- Seattle City Hall (with Bohlin Cywinski Jackson)
- Seattle Municipal Tower (formerly AT&T Gateway Tower)

Schools (by completion date)

- 2015 Liberty High School, Issaquah WA
- 2013 Raisbeck Aviation High School, Tukwila WA
- 2013 Shorewood High School (Washington), Shoreline WA
- 2011 Denny International Middle School, Seattle WA
- 2010 Chief Sealth International High School renovation, Seattle WA
- 2009 Lynnwood High School, Bothell WA
- 2008 St. Thomas School, Medina WA
- 2007 Kingston High School, Kingston WA
- 2006 Forest Ridge School of the Sacred Heart, Bellevue, WA
- 2005 Pacific Cascade Freshman Campus, Issaquah WA
- 2003 Todd Beamer High School, Federal Way WA
- 2002 The Center School, Seattle WA
- 1998 Edmonds-Woodway High School, Edmonds, WA

Historic Schools & University Buildings (by completion date)

- 2018 Natrona County High School, Casper, WY
- 2017 Roosevelt High School, Portland, OR
- 2017 Stewart Middle School, Tacoma, WA
- 2006 Roosevelt High School, Seattle WA
- 2006 Stadium High School, Tacoma WA (with Merrit Pardini Architects)
- 2006 Madison Middle School (Seattle, Washington), Seattle WA
- 2002 West Seattle High School, Seattle WA
- 2000 John Stanford International School, Seattle WA
- 2007 Guggenheim Hall, University of Washington, Seattle WA {photos}
- 2000 Mary Gates Hall, University of Washington, Seattle WA
- 1990 Franklin High School, Seattle WA

Other

- 2018 Fire Station No. 5, Seattle, WA
- 2010 First United Methodist Church, Seattle WA
- 2010 Fire Station No. 17, Seattle WA
- 2005 Trinity Parish Episcopal Church, Seattle WA

== Awards and designations ==
Council of Educational Facilities Planners International (CEFPI / A4LE)

- 2015 James D. MacConnell Award (finalist) - for Raisbeck Aviation High School
- 2010 James D. MacConnell Award - for Lynnwood High School
- 2002 James D. MacConnell Award (finalist) - for Todd Beamer High School
- 1999 School Planning & Management - for Edmonds-Woodway High School
- 1998 James D. MacConnell Award - for Edmonds-Woodway High School

School Design

- Impact on Learning Award - for Stadium High School
- 2005 Schools of Distinction Awards, Best of the Best - for John Stanford International School
- 2003 Goldman Sachs Foundation, Prize for Excellence in International Education - for John Stanford International School

American Institute of America Awards (AIA)

- 2006 AIA Washington Civic Design Awards, Honor Award - for Seattle City Hall
- 2005 AIA Seattle, Commendation for Design - for Seattle City Hall
- 2004 AIA Washington Civic Design Awards, Merit Award - for West Seattle High School
- 2003 AIA Washington DC Chapter, Merit Award - for Mary Gates Hall, UW
- 2003 AIA Northwest & Pacific Region, Award of Merit - for Wa Le Hut Indian School
- 2000 AIA Northwest & Pacific Region, Award of Merit - for Stadium High School
- 1999 AIA Washington Council Civil Design Awards Program, Award of Merit - for Stadium High School
- 1998 AIA Seattle, Award of Commendation- for Wa He Lut Indian School
- 1991 AIA Seattle, Award of Commendation - for Franklin High School

Historic Preservation

- 2007 State Historic Preservation Office, Valerie Sivinski Award for Outstanding Achievement in Historic Preservation Rehabilitation Projects - for Stadium High School
- 2007 Associated Builders & Contractors of Western Washington – Best Historical Restoration Award, Merit Award - for Trinity Parish Episcopal Church
- 2006 State Historic Preservation Office, Valerie Sivinski Award for Outstanding Achievement in Historic Preservation Rehabilitation - for Trinity Parish Episcopal Church
- 2005 State Historic Preservation Office, Outstanding Achievement in Stewardship - for Camp Waskowitz
- 2004 Masonry Institute of Washington, Merit Award - Rehab/Restoration - for West Seattle High School
- 2001 Excellence in Masonry, Honorable Mention - for West Seattle High School
- 2001 Washington Trust for Historic Preservation, Award of Merit - for Franklin High School
- 1991 Association of King County Historical Organization, Project Award - for Franklin High School

Sustainability

- 2009 AIA Regional Top 10 Green Award - for Barn Beach Reserve
- U.S. Green Building Council, LEED for Schools, Gold Certified - for St. Thomas School
- U.S. Green Building Council, LEED Gold Certified - for Seattle City Hall
