= NWHL =

NWHL may refer to these divisions of Northern American ice hockey:

- National Women's Hockey League, later Premier Hockey Federation, (2015–2023)
- National Women's Hockey League (1999–2007)
- North West Hockey League, a minor men's league, 1933–1936
