= No Way Home =

No Way Home may refer to:

== Film ==
- No Way Home (1996 film), a 1996 American crime drama film
- Spider-Man: No Way Home, a 2021 American superhero film in the Marvel Cinematic Universe

== Music ==
- "No Way Home", 2001 song by Richard Hawley on the album Late Night Final
- "No Way Home", 2009 song by Richard Durand
- "No Way Home", 2010 song by Authority Zero on the album Stories of Survival
- "No Way Home", 2014 debut single by Boaz van de Beatz

== Other uses ==
- NYX: No Way Home, a 2008–2009 comics miniseries in the NYX series
- "No Way Home", a 1975 episode of the television series Medical Center
- No Way Home, a 2020 video game developed by SMG Studio
