= Madison Middle School (Seattle) =

James Madison Middle School
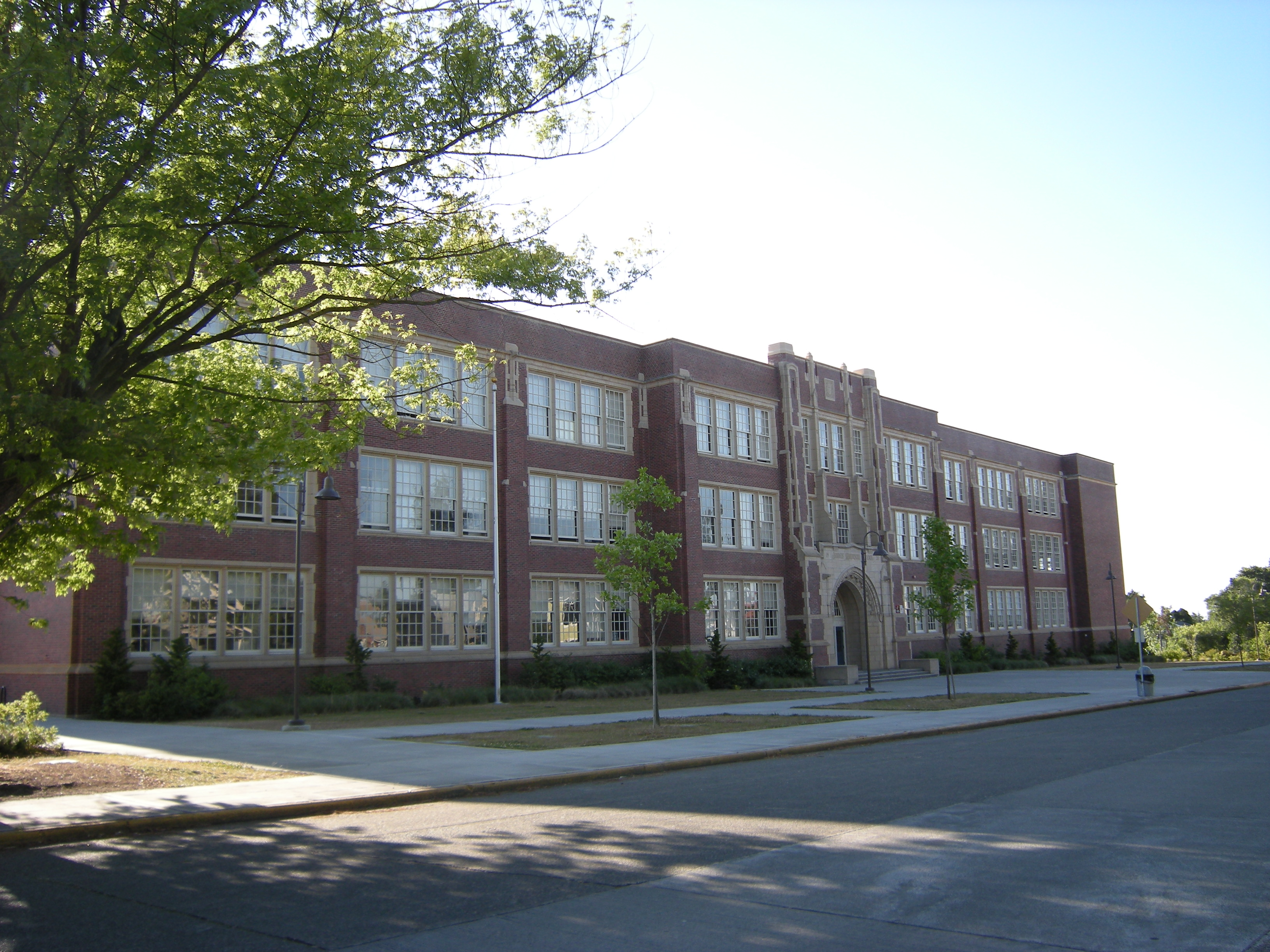
- Madison Middle School

Location
- 3429 45th Ave SW; Seattle, Washington 98116; United States; 47°34′22″N 122°23′24″W

Information
- Type: Public
- Established: 1929
- NCES School ID: 530771001207
- Principal: Dr. Robert Gary
- Faculty: 43
- Enrollment: 922 in grades 6, 7, 8
- Information: (206) 252-9200
- Website: madisonms.seattleschools.org

Madison Middle School is a landmark school located in the northern portion of West Seattle near West Seattle High School. Washington State assessment results in reading and math identifies Madison as a "school in improvement". It was recognized in 2010 by the Center for Educational Effectiveness and Phi Delta Kappa – Washington State Chapter, for the third time as a School of Distinction for outstanding improvements in math and reading that put it in the top 5 percent of highest-improving schools in the state.

== Facilities ==
In 1928 construction on what was initially called West Seattle Intermediate School began. It opened in September 1929 as James Madison Intermediate School with 749 seventh and eighth grade students. Designed by School District architect Floyd Naramore for a capacity of 1300, the 1931 addition increased capacity to 1750 students. A new gymnasium designed by architects Grant, Copeland, Chervenak & Associates was added south of the original building in 1973. Seattle Public School District historic building survey in 1989 listed the school as "likely to meet landmark criteria". Seattle's Landmark Preservation Board has since designated the school as a Landmark.

In 2005 a major redesign, restoration, and expansion was started by Bassetti Architects. The historic portion of the school was restored and new additions terracing down the hill to link to the playfield to the west. A new multi-use commons was centrally located between upper and lower classroom clusters. The original double-sided corridors were restructured to provide learning clusters of classrooms, labs, teacher planning offices and open flexible areas to support grade-based teams. A roof-top deck allows students to spill out from the Commons onto a structured outdoor play area. Ground-source heat pumps were installed under the playfield to provide a low-energy source for the building's heating and cooling. In 2022, a new expansion was completed which added 8 new classrooms.
