= Graham Hill Elementary School =

Graham Hill Elementary
- Graham Hill Elementary School

Location
- 5149 S Graham St; Seattle, Washington 98118; United States; 47°32′45″N 122°16′06″W

Information
- Type: Public
- Established: 1960
- School district: Seattle Public Schools
- Grades: K–5
- Enrollment: 343 (October 2008)
  - Kindergarten: 52
  - Grade 1: 57
  - Grade 2: 65
  - Grade 3: 53
  - Grade 4: 56
  - Grade 5: 43
- Slogan: ONE school serving ALL
- Mascot: Whale
- Website: grahamhilles.seattleschools.org

Graham Hill Elementary School is an elementary school located in the Seward Park neighborhood of Seattle, Washington, US. The school serves students from Pre-K (3+ yrs) through 5th grade as part of the Seattle Public Schools district.

== History and physical plant ==
The first school at this location was opened in 1901 as Brighton. Brighton operated here for four years before moving to the site of the current Brighton Elementary school a few blocks away. The original building was used intermittently over the next couple of decades as an annex to Brighton—it was referred to as Brighton Beach or Little Brighton. The old schoolhouse was removed in 1943 and the site became a public playfield.

By the mid-1950s, the post-war population boom in this area of south Seattle necessitated additional elementary school capacity. The school opened its doors as an annex of Brighton in 1957 in portable buildings set up at the site of the original Brighton school. That year it housed K-2 students and an additional grade was added each successive year until the school was a full K-6.

By 1960, the school had grown to the point where it could break the connection to Brighton and hire its own principal. Construction had also begun on a new brick building, which was completed in 1961. This newly independent school was named Graham Hill School. The name was chosen to honor Walter Graham, who originally settled this area in the mid-1850s, and as a nod to its location at the top of the ridge separating Lake Washington from the Rainier Valley. The school is not related in any way to the British racing driver of the same name.

The school became a K-5 school in 1988, when the school district moved 6th grade students to middle schools.

in 1991, Graham Hill implemented a public Montessori program for grades Pre-K-1st grade. The program grew over the following decade to include five classrooms through the 5th grade. Although the program was well attended and supported by the community, it created division as well due to the fact that it wasn’t offered to all students. In 2012, the Seattle School District eliminated the preschool program due to the lack of access provided for all students. The Montessori program was eventually eliminated by 2019. Currently Graham Hill has a unified curriculum for all classes K-5.

In 2004 work was completed on a $4.8 million expansion which added a new wing containing classroom space and a library expansion. This additional space was needed to replace portables, which had once more been employed. The current school encompasses 55,037 sq ft (5,113.1 m^{2}) on a 4.51 acres (18,300 m^{2}) site with a total of 22 classrooms.

== Academic program ==
Graham Hill is one of only two schools (and the only elementary school) in its district not considered "racially imbalanced" by a recent Seattle Times study. 73% of the school's population is non-white – about equal to the proportion in the school's ZIP code.

== The PTA ==
The Graham Hill PTA meets the fourth Tuesday of every month of the school year, at 6:30 pm. A very active group, the PTA sponsors fundraisers throughout the year to support a variety of events. The PTA also supports ongoing programs and capital improvements. The Graham Hill PTA maintains a discussion list, has a blog, and regularly contributes to the school wiki.

Close-up of a mosaic image of an octopus on the grounds of Graham Hill Elementary
