= Northwestern High School =

Northwestern High School may refer to:

- Northwestern High School in Sciota, Illinois, which was consolidated into West Prairie High School
- Northwestern High School (Indiana)
- Northwestern High School (Baltimore, Maryland)
- Northwestern High School (Hyattsville, Maryland)
- Northwestern High School (Michigan)
- Northwestern High School in Mendon, Missouri
- Northwestern High School (Springfield, Ohio)
- Northwestern High School (West Salem, Ohio)
- Northwestern Senior High School (Pennsylvania)
- Northwestern High School (South Carolina)
- Northwestern High School (Wisconsin)

== See also ==
- Northwest High School (disambiguation)
