= Central Sierra League =

The Central Sierra League is a high school athletic league that is part of the CIF Central Section. The league consists of small schools and plays eight man football.

In 2018, most of the schools from the Central Coast area moved from the Southern Section to join the Central Section. Orcutt Academy from the Santa Maria area joined the Central Sierra League. In its first year in the league, Orcutt came in second to Fresno Christian. Mission Prep also joined the league at the same time.

== Members ==
- Alpaugh High School
- Northwest Christian High School
- Faith Christian Academy
- Fresno Christian
- Mission Prep
- Orcutt Academy
- Riverdale Christian High School
