= Northwest School, Seattle =

The Northwest School

Location
- 1415 Summit Ave; Seattle, Washington; United States

Information
- Motto: Courtesy and Common Sense
- Established: 1980
- Principal: Ray Wilson
- Grades: 6-12
- Enrollment: 506
- Colors: Maroon and White
- Athletics: Basketball, Cross-Country, Soccer, Volleyball, Ultimate Frisbee, Track and Field
- Mascot: The Haüs
- Nickname: "Northwest"
- Affiliations: NAIS, PNAIS
- Website: northwestschool.org
- Summit School
- U.S. National Register of Historic Places
- Seattle Landmark
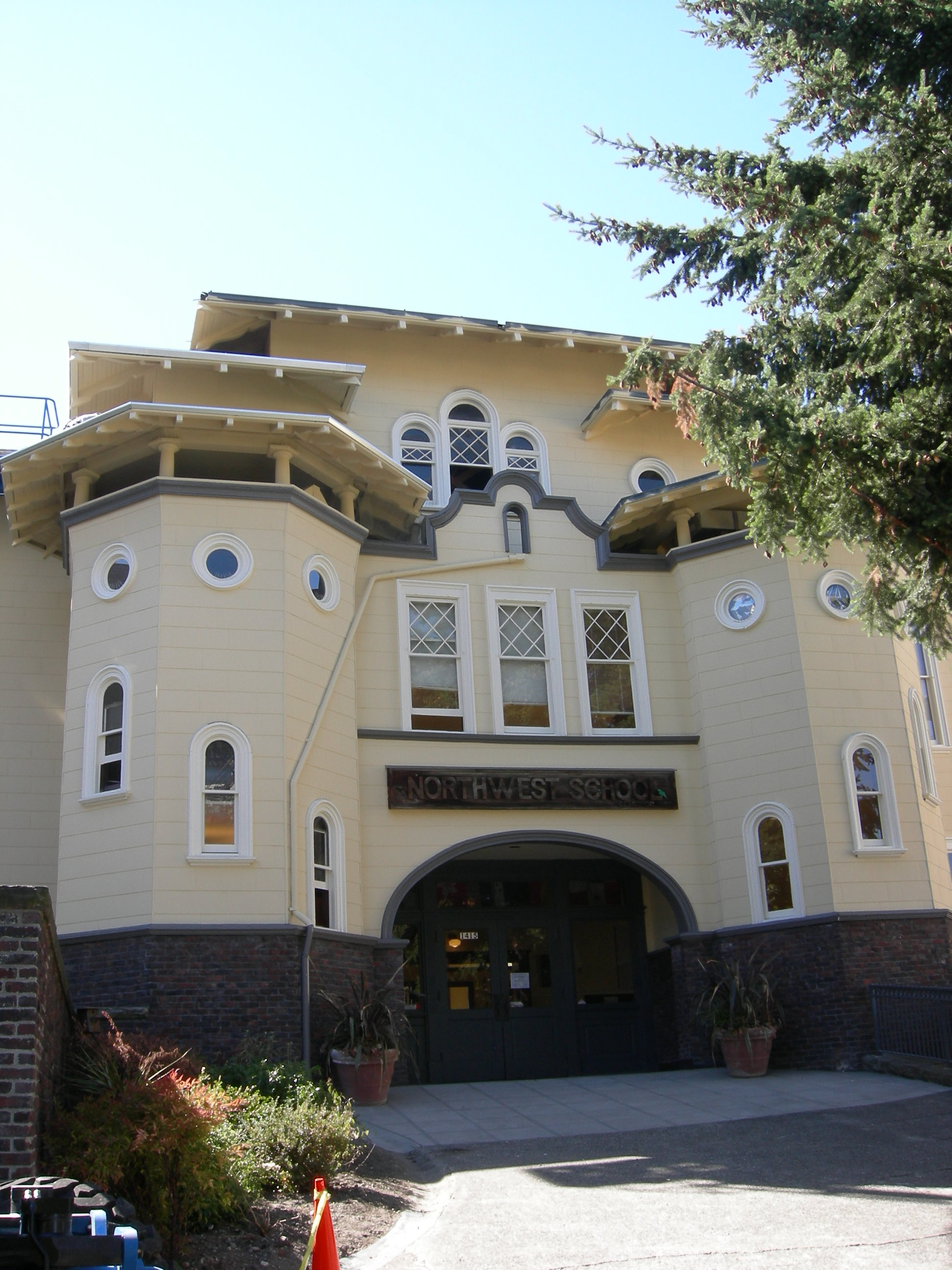
- Northwest School in the old Summit building, 2007

- Location within Washington (state) Location within the United States
- Location: First Hill, Seattle, Washington
- Coordinates: 47°36′48″N 122°19′33″W
- Built: 1905
- Architect: James Stephen
- NRHP reference No.: 79002540

Significant dates
- Added to NRHP: October 4, 1979
- Designated SEATL: March 19, 1990

The Northwest School (originally The Northwest School of the Arts, Humanities and Environment) is a private day and boarding school located on Seattle, Washington's First Hill. The school was founded in 1980 and is primarily located in the 1905 Summit School building, an official City of Seattle landmark that was listed in the National Register of Historic Places in 1979.

The school's student body includes approximately 500 day and boarding students, in grades 6–12, some 16% of whom are from outside the United States. The school has attracted international students for decades, and international opportunities for domestic students range from Central America to Ethiopia.

As of 2020, school review website Niche ranks The Northwest School as the third-best boarding high school, eleventh best private high school, and the twelfth best college prep private high school in Washington state.

== History ==
The Northwest School was founded in 1980 by Ellen Taussig, Paul Raymond, and Mark Terry.

In the earliest years of Northwest’s history, the school administration struggled to make ends meet. An unfortunate side effect of this was that teachers weren’t paid reliably. Frustration amongst some teachers and parents came to a head in 1983, when a group of parents, students, teachers, and trustees organized and left Northwest to found an entirely separate school, called Seattle Academy of Arts and Sciences (SAAS). Students and parents enrolled at Northwest in the Spring and summer of 1983 faced an extremely challenging situation: If one tiny private school wasn’t able to pay the bills, how could two manage? But ultimately both schools flourished.

Alongside the historic Summit School building and the school's dormitory for boarding students, modern additions to the Northwest campus were completed in 2006 (expanded photography studio, library, and computer lab) and 2014 (gymnasium, fitness mezzanine, dining room, kitchen, black-box theatre and a rooftop sports field).

== Academics ==
The school's Humanities program encompasses history, literature and art history in a lecture and discussion format. All high school students take a three-year Humanities core program, one year each of Physical Science, Biology, and Chemistry, and a minimum of three years each of mathematics and a foreign language. Students take two fine art classes each year and must complete at least one class each of theater, visual art, music, and dance before graduation. Fine Arts classes are taught by recognized practitioners.

The school's seniors undertake one advanced seminar in writing, philosophy or literature, and another in the social studies—such as an introductory law seminar, post-colonial studies, Latin American studies, Asian studies, and women's studies. The social studies seminar requires completion of two senior projects: volunteer activity with a political campaign during the fall and a written thesis during the second half of the year. Seniors simultaneously continue with a full academic course load that includes 2-3 courses from the mathematics, science, or language departments and at least one arts course.

== Athletics ==
Sports played at Northwest include Soccer, Cross country running, Track and Field, Basketball, Volleyball, Ultimate Frisbee, and Fitness Team. The school's administration also works to facilitate student participation in city, regional and other intramural sports, such as golf, swimming, water polo and crew.

The Northwest School is very competitive in Ultimate Frisbee.[citation needed] The upper school's varsity men have won Western National Championships in 2005, 2006, 2007 and 2011, and Northwest students made up half of the team that captured the Club National Championship in the summers of 2005 and 2007. In fall 2011, the boys' varsity team had a perfect record of 23–0, winning the inaugural Seattle Invite and the Washington State Championship along the way. That year, both the male and female varsity teams won the Western National Championships and the Washington State Championships. Middle school and high school participation combined is over 30% of the student population.

Notably, Maddie Meyers placed first in the WIAA 1A state cross country championships in 2008, 2009, 2010, and 2011, first in the 1600 m and 3200 m at the state track championships in 2009, 2010, and 2011, and first in the 800 m at the state track championships in 2010 and 2011. She also competed in the 2011 IAAF World Youth Championships.

Northwest School State Titles

Boys Ultimate Frisbee- 2003, 2004, 2005, 2006, 2009, 2010, 2011, 2012, 2013 [citation needed]

Girls Ultimate Frisbee- 2006, 2007, 2009, 2011, 2013, 2014 [citation needed]

Girls Cross-Country- 2015, 2016 [citation needed]

== Notable alumni ==
- Liz Mair, political strategist
- Emmett Shear, technologist and entrepreneur, cofounder of Justin.tv and Twitch
- Jason Finn, musician, Presidents of the United States of America
- Stone Gossard, musician, Pearl Jam
- Chiwoniso Maraire, Zimbabwean singer, songwriter, and exponent of Zimbabwean mbira music
- Jake Shears, musician, Scissor Sisters
- Steve Turner, musician, Mudhoney
- Aya Sumika, actress, Numb3rs
- Smoosh (Asy, Chloe, & Maia)
- Andrew Callaghan, journalist, All Gas No Brakes
- Neeku Purcell, goalkeeper
