= Shiprock Associated Schools, Inc. =

School operator in New Mexico, United States

Coordinates: 36.8050°N 108.6978°W

Shiprock Associated Schools, Inc. (SASI) is an organization that operates two schools associated with the Bureau of Indian Education (BIE) in Shiprock, New Mexico:

- Atsá Biyáázh Community School (elementary)
- Northwest Middle & High School

The National Center for Education Statistics (NCES) counts them as two separate schools.

The organization has a dormitory for its students.

== History ==
The organization was established in 1979 as Shiprock Alternative Schools, Inc.

== Northwest Middle & High School ==
It was formerly known as Shiprock Northwest Alternative High School. Its original purpose was to cater to students who encountered problems in traditional schools.

Prior to 2012 the school system began seeking a conventional school counselor, which it hired by 2012. Alysa Landry of Albuquerque Journal wrote that "Adding the position was part of the schools’ effort to change their image from an alternative education setting to a more mainstream environment."

== Athletics ==
In 1997 the New Mexico Activities Association added Shiprock Northwest to league 1A.
