= John Stanford International School =

Coordinates: 47°39′26″N 122°19′26″W

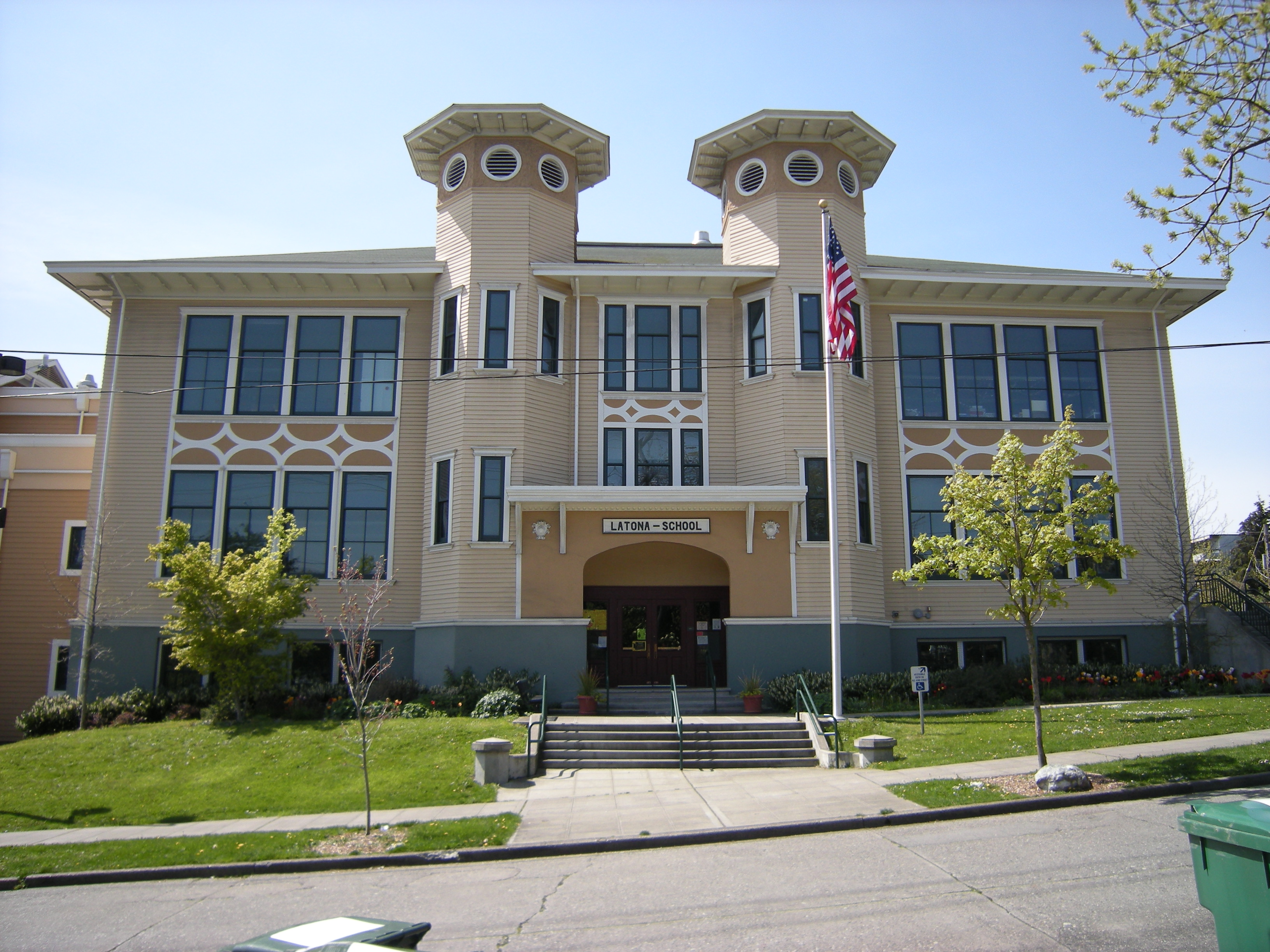

Location
- 4057 5th Ave. NE; Seattle, Washington 98105 U.S.

Information
- Type: Public
- Established: 1891 (school); 1906 (this building)
- Principal: Sarah Jones
- Enrollment: 450 (approximately)
- Campus: Suburban
- Color(s)
- Mascot: Stars
- Website: stanfordes.seattleschools.org

John Stanford International School is an elementary school located in the Wallingford neighborhood of Seattle, Washington, United States. It serves grades K-5 in the Seattle School District and offers a dual-immersion program in Japanese and Spanish that is available to all students. Formerly known as Latona School, the school is named for the late John Stanford, superintendent of the Seattle School District, who died on 28 November 1998. The historic school building (1906) is a designated City of Seattle Landmark.

== Programs ==
The school is one of Seattle Public School's Bilingual Orientation Centers, serving English Language Learners who are new to the country. Students graduating from this school move to a similar program at Hamilton International Middle School. In 1999 the University of Washington identified the John Stanford International School as one of the UW's five K-12 initiatives, which involves the university providing links between faculty, staff, and students from both institutions.

The school strives to raise responsible and caring global citizens by teaching respect and appreciation of the environment and responsible use of the earth's resources. The school's student environmental stewardship leadership team or "Green Team," encourages walking or carpooling to school and initiated a composting program for the school's cafeteria.

== History ==
The school was originally called the Lake Union School and opened in a church annex. The school opened as the Latona School in 1891. It was named for its community on the north shore of Lake Union, the community named for the Greek goddess of light. The current Landmark school was built in 1906 as one of nineteen wood-frame schoolhouses based on a "model plan", of which three others were still in use in 2011 (Coe, Hay, and Stevens). The building was designed by the School District's architect, James Stephen. In 1917 a three-story Renaissance style brick wing was added along the north edge of the site, in 1975 Alternative Elementary #3 was established, and in the 1980s the Escuela Latona program was developed. In 1998 Latona Elementary School was designated as a City Landmark and following restoration in 1999, the building reopened as the John Stanford International School, Latona Campus in 2000. In 2013 the school changed from a neighborhood school serving east Wallingford and the west University District to an option school, open to children from all over the city selected using several criteria including a preference for native Japanese and Spanish speakers and the siblings of current students.

== Facilities ==
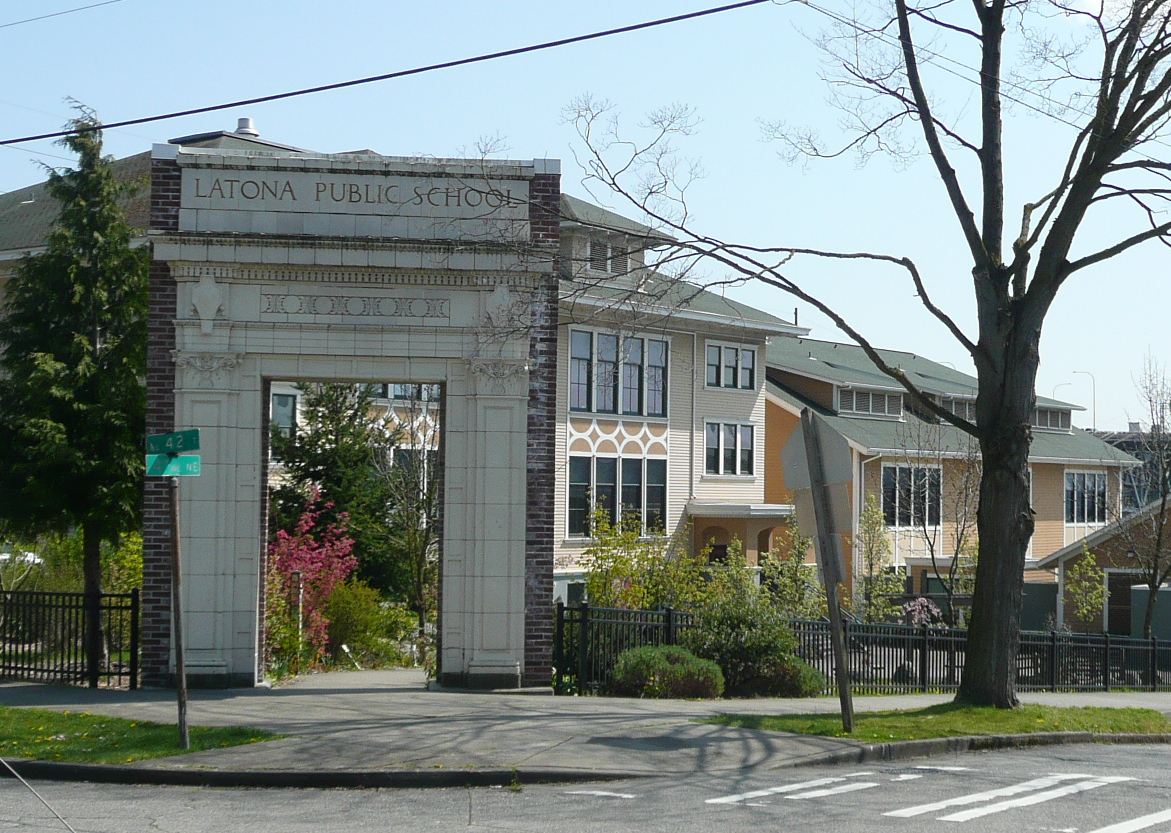
View from the northwest with relocated archway from the (demolished) 1917 addition

The school's 1999 restoration by Bassetti Architects included the revitalization of the 1906 historic building and the educational program. The 1917 brick wing was demolished, with the approval of the City Landmarks Commission. An addition to the historic building recalls the massing, colors and details of the original and exterior paths reinforce connections to the neighborhood. Classrooms are clustered around areas for small group and project-based learning that encourage interaction between the diverse and multi-lingual student population and operable walls between classrooms allow for team teaching and larger class spaces that can be set up in non-traditional ways. A covered exterior play area facilitates all-weather outdoor activities. The project received several awards, including the 2005 Schools of Distinction Awards - Best of the Best and the 2003 iteration of the Goldman Sachs Foundation's Prize for Excellence in International Education.

== Student body ==
As of 2008 the school had about 400 students.

== Curriculum ==
As of 2006 each regular student spends half of his or her time studying in English, and the other half in either Spanish or Japanese. Students with English as a second language take immersion programs. As of 2008, due to the popularity of its program, the school had a waitlist of about 90-100 families, with other families declining to use the waitlist due to distances from their residences.
