= Mass media in Seattle =

The Fisher Plaza, located near the Space Needle has an array of satellite dishes to enable news communication.

Mass media in Seattle includes long-established newspapers, television and radio stations, and an evolving panoply of smaller, local art, culture, neighborhood and political publications, filmmaking and, most recently, Internet media. The Seattle–Tacoma Designated Market Area, as defined by Nielsen Media Research, includes most of Western Washington and the Wenatchee metropolitan area. As of 2021, it is the 12th largest television market and 11th largest radio market in the United States by population.

Seattle has been at the forefront of new media developments since the 1999 protests of a meeting of the World Trade Organization in Seattle spurred the formation of the city's Independent Media Center, which covered and disseminated the breaking news online to a worldwide audience. The location of Microsoft just outside Seattle in nearby Redmond, and the growth of interactive media companies have made Seattle prominent in new digital media.

== Newspapers ==
The old Seattle Times building in downtown Seattle is on the National Register of Historic Places.

Seattle's major daily newspaper is The Seattle Times. The local Blethen family owns 50.5% of the Times, the other 49.5% being owned by the McClatchy Company. The Times holds the largest Sunday circulation in the Pacific Northwest. The Seattle Post-Intelligencer (now online only) is owned by the Hearst Corporation. The Seattle Daily Journal of Commerce covers economic news, and The Daily of the University of Washington, the University of Washington's school paper, is published five days per week during the school year.

The Seattle newspaper landscape changed dramatically in 2009, when the Seattle Post-Intelligencer ceased print publication. Previously, the Post-Intelligencer and The Seattle Times had shared a joint-operating agreement under which the Times handled business operations outside the newsroom for its competitor. When the Post-Intelligencer went online-only as SeattlePI.com, The Seattle Times felt the blow financially but continues to be a profit-earning publication and even increased its print circulation in 2009 by 30 percent. Nonetheless, the P-I's move to online-only resulted in 145 jobs lost at that publication, while The Seattle Times cut 150 editorial positions shortly before that, in December 2008. The Times reaches 7 out of 10 adults in King and Snohomish Counties. With fewer resources, the Times took steps to consolidate some of its news coverage: for example, folding the daily business section into the paper's A section. The Seattle Times has been recognized for its editorial excellence: The newspaper has been the recipient of nine Pulitzer Prizes. In recent years, the Times has begun to partner with other types of media outlets, including collaborations with several local bloggers that are funded by American university's J-Lab: the Institute for Interactive Journalism and the John S. and James L. Knight Foundation.

The most prominent weeklies are the Seattle Weekly and The Stranger. Both consider themselves alternative papers. The Stranger, founded in 1992, is locally owned and has a younger and hipper readership. The Seattle Weekly, founded in 1976, has a longstanding reputation for in-depth coverage of the arts and local politics. It was purchased in 2000 by Village Voice Media, which in turn was acquired in 2005 by New Times Media. New Times Media has decreased the Weekly's emphasis on politics. Other weekly papers are the Seattle Gay News and Real Change, an activist paper sold by homeless and low-income people. The Puget Sound Business Journal covers the local economy. The Rocket, a long-running weekly magazine devoted to the music scene, stopped publishing in 2000.

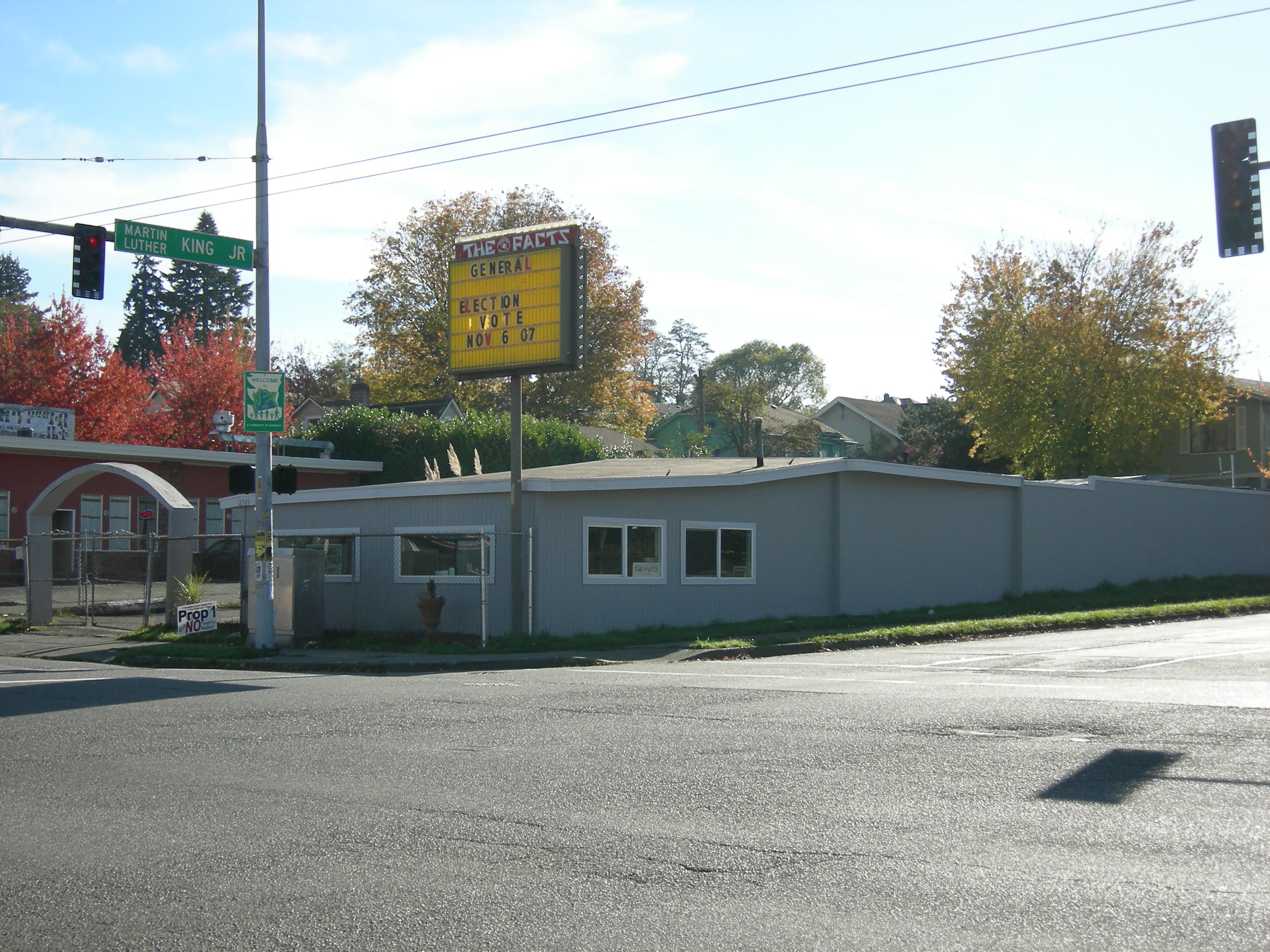
Headquarters of The Facts.

Seattle is also home to several ethnic newspapers. Among these are the African American papers The Facts and the Seattle Medium; the Asian American papers the Northwest Asian Weekly, Seattle Chinese Post, and the International Examiner; and the JTNews (formerly the Jewish Transcript). There are also numerous neighborhood newspapers, such as the Seattle Sun and Star, the West Seattle Herald, the Ballard News-Tribune, and the papers of the Pacific Publishing Company, which include the Queen Anne News, Magnolia News, North Seattle Herald-Outlook, Capitol Hill Times, Beacon Hill News & South District Journal, and the Madison Park Times.

=== Daily ===
- Seattle Daily Journal of Commerce
- The Seattle Times

=== Weekly ===
- The Catholic NW Progress
- Eat The State
- International Examiner
- Marples Northwest Business Letter
- Nguoi Viet Tay Bac (Vietnamese language)
- North American Post
- Northwest Asian Weekly
- Phuong Dong News (Vietnamese language)
- Puget Sound Business Journal
- Seattle Chinese Post (Chinese language)
- Seattle Chinese Times (Chinese language)
- Epoch Times Seattle (Chinese language)
- Seattle Gay News
- Seattle Jewish Transcript
- Seattle Medium
- Seattle Soy Sauce (Japanese language)
- Shoreline/Lake Forest Enterprise
- El Siete Dias (Spanish language)
- The Skanner
- The Stranger

=== Community ===
Robinson Newspapers publishes Westside Weekly, which is a combination of the Ballard News-Tribune, West Seattle Herald / White Center News, and The Highline Times / The Des Moines News.

- Ballard News-Tribune
- Capitol Hill Times
- The Highline Times
- Madison Park Times
- Shoreline/Lake Forest Enterprise
- Queen Anne & Magnolia News
- West Seattle Herald

=== College ===
- The Daily
- The Falcon
- The Sentinel
- SU Spectator
- Seattle Central College

=== Defunct ===
- The Argus
- Helix
- North Seattle Journal
- Seattle Post-Intelligencer
- The Seattle Republican
- The Seattle Star
- Seattle Star (2002–2005)
- Seattle Union Record
- Seattle Weekly

== Magazines ==
425 Magazine, its companion for the business market, 425 Business, South Sound, and South Sound Business are published by Premier Media and reach the greater Puget Sound area.

Two locally owned magazines for parents, ParentMap Newsmagazine and Seattle's Child, are published monthly. Conscious living magazine Seattle Natural Awakenings is also locally owned and published monthly. The multi-ethnic glossy Colors NW publishes a companion Colors NW video podcast. Seattle Magazine and Seattle Metropolitan, local lifestyle magazines, are published monthly. Northwest Woman Magazine is a regional bimonthly publication for the Northwest woman; it is published in Spokane.

425Business is a monthly Seattle business magazine.

Environmental online magazines Worldchanging and Grist are based in Seattle.

Sound Rider!, an online motorcycling magazine, is also published from Seattle.

OutdoorsNW magazine, published by Price Media, Inc. in Seattle since 1988, serves the active, outdoor recreational enthusiasts.

== Satire ==
Seattle has a long history of hyper-local satire that stretches from the days of a late-night skit show Almost Live!—which launched the careers of Joel McHale and Bill Nye the Science Guy. A modern satire website, The Needling, is described by many as a local version of satire site The Onion.

== Television ==
A broadcast tower used by KIRO-TV

The Seattle television market is the 13th largest in the United States; it includes the adjacent cities of Tacoma, Bellevue, Everett, and Bellingham; and additional viewers from British Columbia, Canada (Vancouver and its surrounding area on broadcast and cable).

Seattle is served by numerous television stations. The major network affiliates are KOMO 4 (ABC), KING 5 (NBC), KIRO 7 (CBS), KCTS 9 (PBS), KCPQ 13 (Fox) and KUNS 51 (The CW), which are also seen across Canada via digital cable and satellite providers. Also broadcasting in English are two independent stations (KSTW 11 and KONG 6/16 with the latter run by/with KING TV), KTBW 20 (TBN), KZJO 22 (MyNetworkTV), KBTC 28 (PBS), KWPX-TV 33 (ION), KFFV 44 (MeTV). Most of these can be seen in Canada via digital cable or satellite. There are also two Spanish-language affiliates: KVOS 12 (Univision), which is licensed to Bellingham and Telemundo on the fourth subchannel of KIRO-TV.

Seattle's commercial TV stations distinguish themselves from one another in various ways. KING-TV, owned by Tegna Media, has been nominated for 56 Regional Emmy Awards. The station allows viewers to submit their own photo and video content via its website and also highlights the work of average citizens in the community on-air in the recurring feature, "Home Team Heroes." The former parent company of KOMO, Fisher Communications (which sold its media properties to the Sinclair Broadcast Group in 2013), launched a network of hyperlocal websites in 2009, which include blogs about issues related to community service, news of interest to families, crime news, and news about events occurring around the neighborhood. Finally, KIRO, owned by Cox Enterprises, maintains three reporters in a Washington, DC, bureau to cover news of interest to viewers back in Washington State.

Seattle also has three public television stations. The Seattle Channel, Government-access television (GATV) run by the city, airs public affairs, community service, and arts programming. The station is funded partly by cable television franchise fees and partly by a $5 million grant from Comcast, which will be paid over 10 years to support arts programming. After first focusing on civic programming, the Seattle Channel has become known for its arts programming. As the station's on-air priorities have begun to emphasize arts programs, it has shifted much of the government accountability-oriented programming to live streaming on the Internet, best accessed by viewers with high-speed Internet access. KCTS-TV is Seattle's PBS member station and operates three feeds: a primary, high-definition, general interest station; KCTS 9 PBS Kids (digital subchannel 9.2), which features children's programs; and KCTS 9 Create (digital subchannel 9.3), which features DIY, cooking, arts and crafts, and travel programs. In 2009 KCTS aired 160 episodes in a regularly occurring series on local public affairs, personal finance, economic issues, and business affairs. While KCTS is a popular source for viewing nationally produced PBS shows, it features less programming on local public affairs than the region's other two public TV stations. The third public station, SCAN, is Seattle's public access cable television network. A 501(c)3 nonprofit, it provides equipment, production facilities, and media instruction for residents of Seattle and other King County communities. Although its funding is limited, SCAN often airs more locally produced public affairs programming each week than all the city's broadcast networks combined.

Cable networks based out of the area include Root Sports Northwest, ResearchChannel and UWTV. Seattle cable viewers also receive CBUT-DT 2 (CBC) from Vancouver, British Columbia, often carried on cable channel 99. The 24-hour Northwest Cable News was available on cable until 2017.

The song Kiro TV by the Sneaker Pimps on the album Bloodsport is named after the KIRO-TV station.

=== Broadcast TV ===
Note: Bold letters indicate a network owned-and-operated station.

Channel	Call sign	Network	Owner	Subchannels
4	KOMO	ABC	Sinclair Broadcast Group	Comet on 4.2, Charge! on 4.3
5	KING	NBC	Tegna Inc.	True Crime Network on 5.2, Quest on 5.3, 365BLK on 5.4, QVC2 on 5.5
6	KYMU-LD	Estrella TV	Seattle 6 Broadcasting LLC	TheGrio on 6.2, Retro on 6.4, Heartland on 6.5
7	KIRO	CBS	Cox Media Group	Cozi TV on 7.2, Laff on 7.3, Telemundo on 7.4
9	KCTS	PBS	Cascade Public Media	PBS Kids on 9.2, Create on 9.3, World on 9.4
11	KSTW (licensed to Tacoma, studios in Seattle)	Independent	CBS News and Stations	Start TV on 11.2, Fave TV on 11.3, Dabl on 11.4, MovieSphere Gold on 11.5, HSN on 11.6
13	KCPQ (licensed to Tacoma, studios in Seattle)	Fox	Fox Television Stations	Court TV on 13.2, Ion Mystery on 13.3, Buzzr on 13.4, Fox Weather on 13.5
16	KONG (licensed to Everett, studios in Seattle)	Independent	Tegna Inc.	True Crime Network on 16.2 (via KZJO), Confess on 16.3 (via KCPQ)
20	KTBW (licensed to Tacoma)	TBN	Trinity Broadcasting Network	Hillsong Channel on 20.2, Smile of a Child on 20.3, Enlace on 20.4, Positiv on 20.5
22	KZJO	MyNetworkTV	Fox Television Stations	KCPQ on 22.2, Antenna TV on 22.3, Nosey on 22.5
28	KBTC (licensed to Tacoma)	PBS	Bates Technical College	NHK World on 28.2, FNX on 28.3
33	KWPX-TV (licensed to Bellevue)	Ion	Ion Media	Court TV on 33.2, Bounce TV on 33.3, Grit on 33.4, Defy TV on 33.5, TrueReal on 33.6, Scripps News on 33.7, HSN on 33.8
44	KFFV	MeTV	Weigel Broadcasting	Movies! on 44.2, H&I on 44.3, Catchy Comedy on 44.4, MeTV Plus on 44.5, Story Television on 44.6
46	KUSE-LD	OnTV4U	HC2 Holdings	Defy TV on 46.2, Sonlife Broadcasting Network (SBN) on 46.3, Shop LC on 46.4, Oxygen on 46.5, NBC American Crimes on 46.6, Outlaw on 46.7, Infomercials on 46.8, Fubo Sports on 46.9
51	KUNS (licensed to Bellevue)	The CW	Sinclair Broadcast Group	Roar on 51.2, The Nest on 51.3
56	KWDK (licensed to Tacoma)	Daystar	Word of God Fellowship	

=== Cable TV ===
Cable network	Owner
Root Sports Northwest	Seattle Mariners
KO-AM TV	KO-AM
ResearchChannel	ResearchChannel
SCAN TV	SCAN
Seattle Channel	City of Seattle
UWTV	University of Washington

== Radio ==
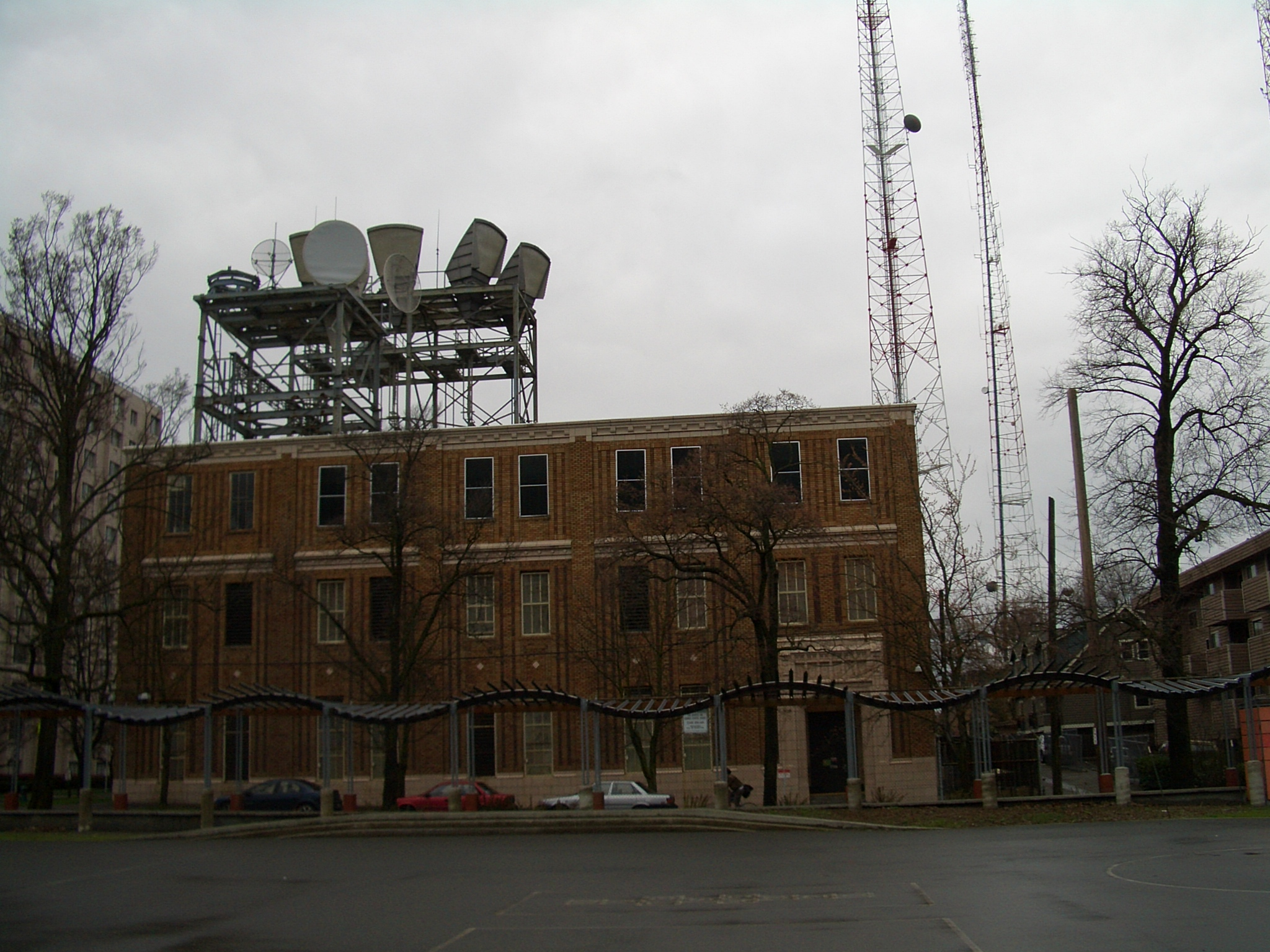
Antennas in Capitol Hill

Seattle has the thirteenth largest radio market in the United States, though this ranking does not take into account Canadian audiences. The radio market stretches across Puget Sound and Western Washington.

=== AM stations ===
Call sign	Frequency	City of License	Owner	Format
KVI	570 AM	Seattle	Lotus	Talk
KCIS	630 AM	Edmonds	Crista Ministries	Christian radio
KIRO	710 AM	Seattle	Bonneville Communications	Sports (ESPN Radio)
KTTH	770 AM	Seattle	Bonneville Communications	Talk
KGNW	820 AM	Burien, WA	Salem Communications	Christian Radio
KHHO	850 AM	Tacoma	iHeartMedia	Conservative talk
KIXI	880 AM	Mercer Island	Hubbard Radio	Adult Standards
KJR	950 AM	Seattle	iHeartMedia	Sports
KNWN	1000 AM	Seattle	Lotus	All News (ABC Radio)
KBLE	1050 AM	Seattle		Catholic (EWTN)
KPTR	1090 AM	Seattle	iHeartMedia	Conservative talk
KKNW	1150 AM	Seattle	Hubbard Radio	Talk
KMIA	1210 AM	Auburn-Federal Way	Adelente Media Group	Spanish Contemporary
KKDZ	1250 AM	Kent	Universal Media Access	Ethnic
KKOL	1300 AM	Seattle	Salem Communications	Talk
KKMO	1360 AM	Tacoma		Regional Mexican
KRKO	1380 AM	Everett		Oldies-Classic hits-Sports
KRIZ	1420 AM	Renton	Bennett Media Group, LLC	Urban Adult Contemporary
KARR	1460 AM	Kirkland	Family Stations, Inc.	Christian Radio
KBRO	1490 AM	Bremerton		Spanish Contemporary Christian
KKXA	1520 AM	Snohomish		Classic country
KXPA	1540 AM	Bellevue	Multicultural Broadcasting	Ethnic
KLFE	1590 AM	Seattle	Salem Communications	Christian talk
KYIZ	1620 AM	Renton	Bennett Media Group, LLC	Urban Contemporary
KNTS	1680 AM	Seattle	Salem Communications	Spanish Christian talk

=== FM stations ===
Call sign	Frequency	City of License	Owner	Format
KNKX	88.5 FM	Tacoma	Friends of 88.5 FM	Public Radio/Jazz
KNHC	89.5 FM	Seattle	Seattle Public Schools	Electronic/Dance
KEXP	90.3 FM	Seattle	Friends of KEXP	Eclectic
KBCS	91.3 FM	Bellevue	Bellevue College	Variety Music/News
KQMV	92.5 FM	Bellevue	Hubbard Broadcasting	Top 40/CHR
KJR	93.3 FM	Seattle	iHeartMedia	Sports
KSWD	94.1 FM	Seattle	Audacy	Hot AC
KUOW	94.9 FM	Seattle	University of Washington	NPR/News/Talk
KJEB	95.7 FM	Seattle	iHeartMedia	Classic hits
KJAQ	96.5 FM	Seattle	iHeartMedia	Adult hits
KIRO	97.3 FM	Tacoma	Bonneville Communications	News/Talk
KING	98.1 FM	Seattle	Classic Radio	Classical
KPNW	98.9 FM	Seattle	Hubbard Broadcasting	Country
KISW	99.9 FM	Seattle	Audacy	Mainstream rock
KKWF	100.7 FM	Seattle	Audacy	Country
KPLZ	101.5 FM	Seattle	Lotus Communications	Classic country
KQES-LP	101.9 FM	Bellevue	Chinese Public Radio	Variety
KZOK	102.5 FM	Seattle	iHeartMedia	Classic rock
KHTP	103.7 FM	Tacoma	Audacy	Classic hip-hop
KLSW	104.5 FM	Covington	Educational Media Foundation	Contemporary Christian (K-Love)
KHUH-LP	104.9 FM	Seattle	Hollow Earth Radio	Variety
KCMS	105.3 FM	Edmonds	Crista Ministries	Contemporary Christian
KBKS	106.1 FM	Tacoma	iHeartMedia	Top 40/CHR
KRWM	106.9 FM	Bremerton	Hubbard Broadcasting	Adult contemporary
KNDD	107.7 FM	Seattle	Audacy	Alternative rock

Coverage of news and public affairs across Seattle's radio dial is inconsistent. KIRO (97.3 FM), which has a newsroom of 30 people, airs 34 hours of news programming per week, with a primary focus on local reporting; counting news analysis segments and related programming, this reaches 91 hours per week. KNWN (1000 AM and 97.7 FM) airs news and commentary 24 hours per day, 7 days per week. Kris Bennett Broadcasting, a trio of stations serving the black community, airs 5 hours of local talk radio programming each week.

Many Seattle radio stations are also available through internet radio, with KEXP being the first radio station to offer real-time playlists, broadcast uncompressed CD quality music over the internet 24 hours a day, and offer internet archives of its shows (podcasts). Hollow Earth Radio began as an online-only station, emphasizing local artists outside the mainstream music scene, but in 2017 added a low power FM broadcast capability.

== Internet ==
The staff of Seattle Transit Blog pose with their ORCA cards in 2010

The Seattle area is home to variety of online media outlets, including hyperlocal blogs and publications that cater to specific neighborhoods or suburbs. Among them the Capitol Hill Seattle Blog and West Seattle Blog—both founded in the mid-2000s—and newer outlets such as the South Seattle Emerald. Some sites are run by journalists first trained in traditional media, such as Next Door Media, a network of 10 neighborhood blogs that nets a combined 1 million page views per month. Despite varied audiences, a content analysis conducted by the New America Foundation found that online media are filling gaps in news coverage left by traditional media. The study found that Capitol Hill Seattle Blog, West Seattle Blog, My Ballard, and Wallyhood devoted a greater percentage of their news coverage to issues specific to Seattle's neighborhoods. SeattleTimes.com and SeattlePI.com, on the other hand, covered more metro, national, and international news. The blogs devoted a greater percentage of their coverage to the combined subjects of politics, health, education, employment, social services, and arts and entertainment.

Other blogs focus on specific subjects across the entire Seattle metropolitan area, such as transportation for Seattle Bike Blog, Seattle Transit Blog, and The Urbanist. SportsPressNW, founded by sports columnists Art Thiel and Steve Rudman, focuses on sports. GeekWire, founded in 2011 by former P-I reporters John Cook and Todd Bishop, focuses on the technology and startup industries. Do206 focuses on arts-and-entertainment event listings, news and information was founded by Adam Zacks, founder of the Sasquatch! Music Festival, and Scott Porad, a local technology executive.

The first significant foray into Internet media in Seattle came along with Indymedia, a co-op started in 1999 that has since spread to many cities around the world. In the decade since the founding of Indymedia, all of the city's mainstream media outlets have established or augmented their online presence, and numerous blogs have sprung up to supplement traditional media. The city hit another first when the Seattle Post-Intelligencer became the first online-only newspaper in the nation, and as SeattlePI.com, that outlet has experimented with its growth by adding reader blogs and neighborhood-focused blogs. The P-I first began experimenting with blog-driven community engagement with the "Big Blog," a local news blog whose founding reporter used to hold regular public meet-ups with Seattle residents, a practice now embraced by other local bloggers, as well.

Across the Seattle region, 43% of adults read news online on a regular basis and another 21% read or contribute to blogs. In addition to blogs, other online media outlets that offer wider-ranging coverage include Crosscut, started by Seattle Weekly founder David Brewster and more recently acquired by Cascade Public Media, Publicola.net, Investigate West & Seattle Post Globe. Sea Beez, a content-sharing online portal for ethnic media outlets, is in the process of launching a local news site.

In 2018, the online non-profit Cascadia Magazine was launched, "covering people, places and culture of the Pacific Northwest" with both in-depth features and literary works. Stories and authors span Washington, Oregon and British Columbia. It was started by journalist Andrew Engelson. A daily newsletter, begun in 2017, offers curated news briefs about/around the Pacific Northwest from other local news outlets.

The City of Seattle Information Technology department identified 260 websites focused on Seattle's local neighborhoods and communities, including non-traditional, linked news and information outlets. Much of this online activity is driven by the rich hyperlocal news scene in the city, which has seen an exponential growth this past decade. This has been led in the area by sites such as westseattleblog.com and myballard.com, but also old media companies such as KOMO There's a pair of articles here and here covering the ad scene for hyperlocal in January 2010.

The background to Seattle's extensive coverage on the Internet is the city's history of flourishing alternative media, ranging from small presses to low power FM radio broadcasting. The independent, volunteer-run KRAB-FM radio, a high powered station that operated on 107.7 MHz in the regular broadcast band, influenced a generation of listeners during the 1960s and 1970s. Later, before Internet radio became practical, a number of very low power, microradio FM stations broadcast on the few FM frequencies not allocated to high power stations. Currently, FCC deliberations and rulings about Internet radio are followed not only by Internet entrepreneurs, but also by those Seattleites who produced and listened to local radio as well as by those who produce and read the numerous local print publications.

== Movies ==
Many movies have been set or filmed in the Seattle area (although many were actually filmed in Vancouver), including:

- 10 Things I Hate about You (1999 film)
- 3000 Miles to Graceland (2001 film)
- 50/50 (2011 film)
- The 6th Man (1997 film)
- 88 minutes (2008 film)
- Agent Cody Banks (2003 film)
- Air Bud (1997 film)
- American Heart (1992 film)
- Another Stakeout (1993 film)
- Assassins (1995 film)
- Austin Powers: The Spy Who Shagged Me (1999 film)
- Battle in Seattle (2008 film)
- Black Widow (1987 film)
- Carpool (1996 film)
- The Changeling (1980 film)
- The Christmas List (1997 TV film)
- Chronicle (2012 film)
- Cinderella Liberty (1973 film)
- Class of 1999 (1990 film)
- Code Name: The Cleaner (2007 film)
- Cthulhu (2007 film)
- The Details (2011 film)
- Disclosure (1994 film)
- Double Jeopardy (1999 film)
- Expiration Date (2006 film)
- Extreme Days (2001 film)
- The Fabulous Baker Boys (1989 film)
- Fat Kid Rules the World (2012 film)
- Fear (1996 film)
- Fifty Shades of Grey (2015 film)
- Finding Mr. Right (2013 film)
- Firewall (2006 film)
- Get Carter (2000 film)
- A Guy Thing (2003 film)
- The Hand That Rocks the Cradle (1992 film)
- Harry and the Hendersons (1987 film)
- Harry in Your Pocket (1973 film)
- The Heart of the Game (2006 documentary)
- House of Games (1987 film)
- The Immaculate Conception of Little Dizzle (2009 film)
- It Happened at the World's Fair (1963 film)
- The King of Fighters (2010 film)
- The King of Kong: A Fistful of Quarters (2007 documentary)
- Laggies (2014 film)
- The Last Mimzy (2007 film)
- Life or Something Like It (2002 film)
- Little Buddha (1993 film)
- Love, Guaranteed (2020 film)
- Love Happens (2009 film)
- Mad Love (1995 film)
- Man of the House (1995 film)
- Max Rules (2005 film)
- McQ (1974 film)
- My Mother's Future Husband (2014 television film)
- My Own Private Idaho (1991 film)
- The Night Strangler (1973 TV film)
- No Retreat, No Surrender (1986 film)
- An Officer and a Gentleman (1982 film)
- Outsourced (2006 film)
- The Paper Tigers (2020 film)
- The Parallax View (1974 film)
- Paycheck (2002 film)
- Perfect Body (1997 television film)
- Police Beat (2005 film)
- Rapture-Palooza (2013 film)
- The Ring (2002 film)
- Robin of Locksley (1996 TV film)
- Safety Not Guaranteed (2012 film)
- Saving Silverman (2001 film)
- Say Anything... (1989 film)
- Scorchy (1976 film)
- Shoot to Kill (1988 film)
- Short Time (1990 film)
- Singles (1992 film)
- Slaves to the Underground (1997 film)
- Sleepless in Seattle (1993 film)
- The Slender Thread (1965 film)
- Sonicsgate (2009 documentary)
- Sonic the Hedgehog 2 (2022 film)
- Stakeout (1987 film)
- Street Fighter II: The Animated Movie (1994 film)
- Streetwise (1984 documentary)
- Surviving the Game (1994 film)
- Things We Lost in the Fire (2007 film)
- This Boy's Life (1993 film)
- This Is Spinal Tap (1984 film)
- Tugboat Annie (1933 film)
- Unforettable (1996 film)
- The Vanishing (1993 film)
- Walking Tall (2004 film)
- WarGames (1984 film)

== Media art non-profits ==
- 911 Media Arts Center
- Knok Studio
- Northwest Film Forum

== Analysis ==
Friedland (2014) and others have lauded Seattle as a model for the nation and perhaps the world in its robust "civic communication ecology" that attempts to provide high speed Internet access and computer and media training to all, including those with low incomes, that has allegedly contributed to a higher rate of democratic participation than elsewhere. Friedland identified three key features of this:

1. "[A] robust, healthy local newspaper [The Seattle Times], with a strong online presence that ... will be a hub of connection, rather than the single authoritative fount of knowledge."
2. "[A] civic communications network [that is] equally accessible to everyone", subsidized at least initially by municipal investment in neighborhood centers that provide free or low-cost training in computer and media literacy.
3. "[A] larger civic communication ecology [resting] on the foundation of a ... robust micro-ecology, among individuals, niches, groups, and neighborhoods, that generates information from below."

In this system, news percolates up as well as down with news writing and research being shared between levels in an open and conscious way. This system has been created out of a combination of the high-tech base of the metro area with higher than average education level and incomes but with modest grants (typically a few thousand dollars) for a variety of projects funded by government, J-Lab and the John S. and James L. Knight Foundation.
