= Eastern Cafe =

Defunct coffee shop in Seattle, Washington, U.S.

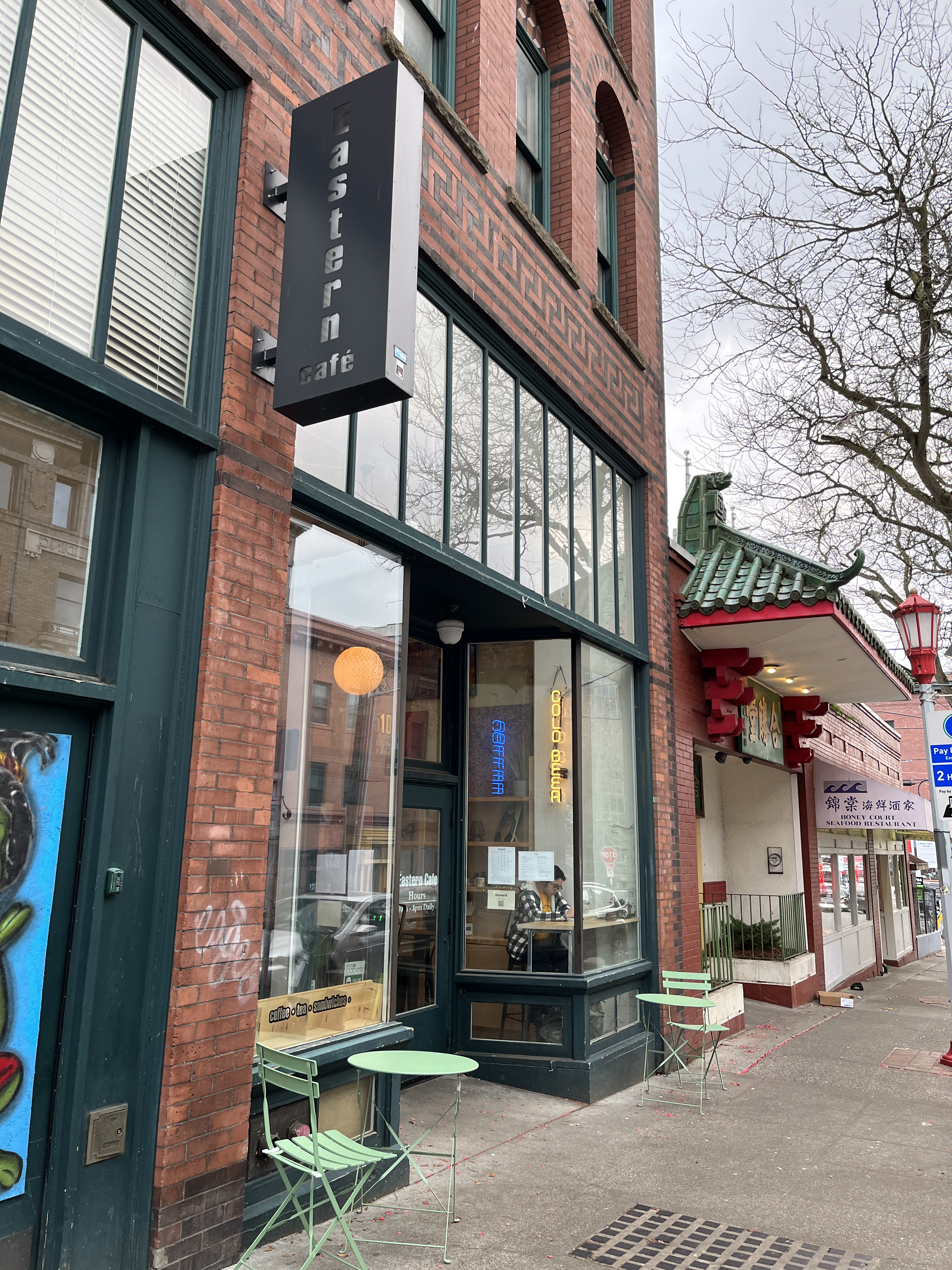
- The cafe's exterior in 2023
- Interactive map of Eastern Cafe

Restaurant information
- Established: 2013
- Closed: September 2023
- Owner: I-Miun Liu
- Location: 510 Maynard Avenue S, Seattle, King, Washington, 98104, United States
- Coordinates: 47.5980°N 122.3248°W
- Website: cafeeastern.com

Eastern Cafe was a coffee shop in Seattle's Chinatown–International District, in the U.S. state of Washington. Owned by I-Miun Liu, the business operated from 2013 to 2023, closing as a result of financial difficulties associated with the COVID-19 pandemic.

== Description ==
Eastern Cafe was a two-story, Western-style coffee shop in Seattle's Chinatown–International District. The business operated in the Eastern Hotel building on Maynard Avenue. Aimee Rizzo of The Infatuation said patrons working on their laptops made the shop reminiscent "of a college town cafe in the middle of finals week". The Stranger's Sarah Galvin described the interior as "appealingly industrial without any distressed-jeans-esque overkill", and Jacqueline E. Wu of the International Examiner said the restaurant had an "industrial, yet lofty, feel". The interior had small tables as well as communal seating, high ceilings and gray walls, and "interesting" rotating artwork on display. Eastern Cafe's food menu included crêpes, gelato, sandwiches, and pastries such as pear turnovers. In addition to coffee and espresso drinks, the cafe had a rotating selection of beers on tap, a small wine list, mimosas, and "beermosas".

=== API Flying Bookshelf ===
The cafe housed a small collection of books by Asian Pacific Americans (API) known as the 'API Flying Bookshelf'. Works in the collection included the graphic novel American Born Chinese by Gene Luen Yang, John Okada's novel No-No Boy, and others by Grace Lee Boggs, Yuri Kochiyama, and Thích Nhất Hạnh. An honor system meant there were no checkouts, notices, or fines for borrowing. The project was launched at Eastern Cafe in 2014; founders intended for the collection to remain in the cafe during July and August, before traveling to other cafes throughout the city. The project was started by Sabrina Chen, who was inspired by the Asian American Curriculum Project in San Mateo, California, as well as Derek Dizon. The project's logo and mascot was an anthropomorphic bookshelf with eyes, legs, and wings, designed by artists Angelo Salgado and Jillian Redosendo. Wu said the mascot "represents the ability for APIs to rise in visibility through literature".

== History ==
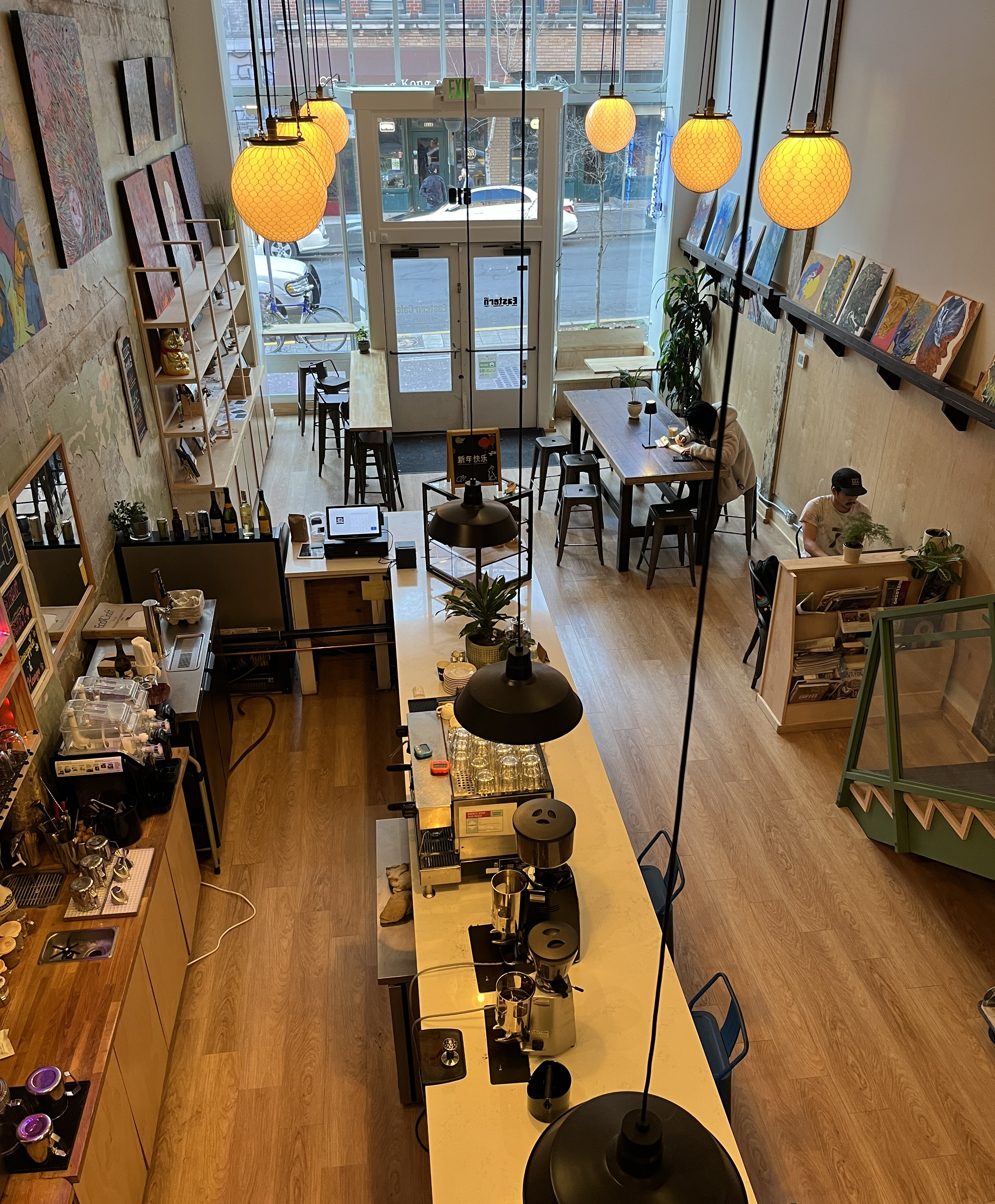
View from the second level

Eastern Cafe opened as one of the district's only Western-style coffee shops in 2013, in a space which previously housed a "stale and confined" office clinic. The cafe was owned by I-Miun Liu, who wanted to create "a place where people can gather, study and meet for work". Liu reportedly took out loans and "maxed out" credit cards to open the restaurant in the "ballroom-like" space, which was vacant for approximately three years before he signed a lease. He had carpet and drywall removed, revealing original fir floors and mint green and yellow cement walls.

According to Liu, Eastern Cafe had a slow start, but gained a following as "the vibe caught on". In 2014, Assunta Ng of Northwest Asian Weekly said the business was generating revenue and expanding. Liu said mayor Ed Murray's proposal to increase the minimum wage to $15 an hour would put Eastern Cafe out of business. In 2014, the told KCPQ that he was considering a closure of Eastern Cafe in order to open a cafe outside Seattle, mentioning Bellevue or Renton as options. Among events hosted at the cafe was a "conversation hour" in 2014 by Eric Pettigrew, a Democratic member of the Washington House of Representatives, and an election night party in 2019 by Port of Seattle commissioner Sam Cho.

Upon the arrival of the COVID-19 pandemic in 2020, Eastern Cafe closed until early March 2022. During the Black Lives Matter and George Floyd protests, Mari Shibuya painted a portrait of Breonna Taylor on one of the restaurant's exterior panels. Eastern Cafe experienced staffing and supply shortages, among other financial difficulties as a result of the pandemic. Despite receiving government assistance and financial support from local API organizations like the Chinatown–International District Business Improvement Area, the cafe closed permanently in September 2023.

== See also ==
- COVID-19 pandemic in Washington (state)
- Impact of the COVID-19 pandemic on the restaurant industry in the United States
- List of defunct restaurants of the United States
