= Seattle Community Access Network =

Community access cable channel in Seattle, Washington

Coordinates: 47.699°N 122.332°W

Seattle Community Access Network (SCAN)
- Country: USA
- Broadcast area: King County and the Puget Sound region
- Headquarters: 1125 N. 98th Street; Seattle, WA 98103; United States

Programming
- Language: English

Ownership
- Owner: SCAN

History
- Launched: August 6, 1999
- Closed: 2010

Links
- Website: www.seattle.gov/cable/publicaccesstv.htm

Seattle Community Access Network (SCAN) was one of the Public, educational, and government access (PEG) cable television channels in Seattle, Washington. The station provided camera equipment, television studios and training that allowed residents of King County to create and cablecast their own television shows for a small fee. The station was carried on Comcast and Broadstripe cable systems in King County and the greater Puget Sound region except for six cities covered by Puget Sound Access.

== History ==
Seattle first acquired a Public-access television station in 1983. Known simply as Channel 29, the station was often referred to as Seattle Public Access Network. The station was operated out of the Northwest Access and Production Center and was owned by the cable company.

In August 1999, Seattle Community Access Network was formed as a non-profit organization in order to take over station operations from TCI. Part of the reason for creating the organization was to handle complaints about adult material being aired on the channel by local producers.

== Overview ==
Seattle Community Access Network provided television productions resources to residents in King County and the greater Puget Sound region for use in creating TV shows and local programming.

SCAN's facility housed two television studios for producing TV programs. The facility also provided three editing booths, several television cameras and related equipment for local residents to use for producing TV shows. SCAN had twelve full-time and three part-time employees that ran the facility and trained residents on how to use the camera equipment and editing suites. The staff regularly held classes to teach residents TV production and video editing.

Part of SCAN's operations included a Youth Media program to help teach local youth how to become filmmakers. The production facilities were also utilized by Reel grrls program run by 911 Media Arts Center and the local YMCA.

== Funding ==
SCAN was funded by cable TV subscribers in the form of Cable television franchise fees. These franchise fees were charged to cable subscribers each month and totalled $6,500,000 in 2009. The fees were passed by the cable company to the Seattle city government and placed in the Cable Television Franchise Subfund that paid for Public-access television, Educational-access television and Government-access television (GATV). These are known as PEG channels for Public, educational, and government access television.

Starting in 2006, the Cable Television Franchise Subfund was managed by the Department of Information Technology (DoIT) and was used to fund things other than PEG channels. SCAN received about 10% of the fund or about $650,000 for its yearly budget. Additional funding for the station came from grants and donations that SCAN actively sought and a small amount came from the fees charged to citizens that used SCAN to create programs.

== Threats to operations ==
There were several threats to the station's operations over the years.

From 1997, before SCAN was created, until 2006, the station aired TV shows with adult material that were produced by local residents. The most visible of these shows was Mike Hunt TV, which ran explicit pornography. The show drew considerable criticism as well as support. Several local residents objected and called into question the station's operations.

In 2005, while the Seattle city government was renegotiating the franchise agreement with Comcast, there were concerns about the cable company trying to shut down the public access station. There were also concerns regarding how public, educational and government channels were handled and how many public access channels should be available.

In September 2010, Seattle Mayor Mike McGinn's proposed budget for the city cut the funding for the station from $650,000 per year to $100,000 per year.

SCAN's last day of broadcasting was June 30, 2011. Seattle Community Media began as operators of public access television in Seattle July 1, 2011.

== Programming ==
SCAN produced a number of television shows that became part of Seattle culture and partnered with Seattle public schools to cablecast local high school sporting events. The station also carried Free Speech TV shows such as Democracy Now!.

=== Current shows ===
BETA TV: is a comedy variety show from the Seattle Neutrino Project/Beta Society improv group. The group has also cablecast their movie Junkbucket on the station.

Blues To Do: is a music variety show that has been on the air for many years and deals with all aspects of the blues.

Crescendo!: is a classical music program featuring Pipe Organs, Piano, Handbells, Choirs, Orchestras, Blues, Relious Music, Dance, and more, that has aired since 2003, starting in New York State, then Seattle, and now New York City and TimeWarner Cable.

Goddess Kring: is an arts and entertainment show that has run for over a decade. The show featured a lot of nudity early in its run.

Psychic Speaks: is a live call-in psychic show that has been on nearly a decade.

Public Exposure: is a long running local government-accountability show. It has featured guests such as former Seattle Police Chief Norm Stamper.

Shifterland: is a variety show starring Cookin' Kitty that has run for several years.

=== Past shows ===
Club Diversity: was a live show that featured culture and diversity in the Seattle area.

Mike Hunt TV: was a pornography and political commentary TV show that caused a stir in Seattle. The show ran from 1997 until 2006 when it was taken off the air.

The Make Josh Famous Half-Hour of Garbage: was a comedy variety show that ran for two years.

Now See It Person To Person: Kurt Cobain Was Murdered: was a show that investigated the death of Kurt Cobain starring Richard Lee. The show ran for over a decade before it was taken off the air in 2008.

The Vintage Vehicle Show: was a show about vintage cars and car shows hosted by Lance Lambert. The show is now syndicated and broadcast on 74 stations across the US and on TV networks in 27 foreign countries.

Go-Kustom TV: aired from 2001 to 2004 on SCAN and featured kustom kulture artists, pin-ups, car builders and bands from around the Greater Seattle Area. The Show was created by D.A. Sebasstian and was recently re-booted with Season 5.

Jerkbeast show: was a 2001 to 2002 live comedy tv show which featured a paper mache monster called the Jerkbeast. The show would have viewers call in and the Jerkbeast along with other crew members would insult and swear at the caller.

Hip Hop 101 TV: was a live Hip Hop variety show spotlighting emcees, djs, dancers and artists from the Pacific Northwest and beyond. Founded in 1999 by MAD Krew, then later co-produced with 206 Zulu and Coolout Network, the show was broadcast until 2009.

== Puget Sound Access ==
Puget Sound Access is the public access channel for six cities in South King County which are Auburn, Burien, Kent, Renton, SeaTac and Tukwila. In March 2004, channel 77 stopped cablecasting SCAN and started cablecasting Puget Sound Access for the six cities in its cablecast area.

== PEG channels ==
Seattle's current franchise agreement requires cable companies to provide eight channel slots for Public, educational, and government access (PEG) channels. The 8 slots are on analog cable and the same 8 slots are on digital cable too, and so total 16 channels altogether.

=== One Public Access channel ===
- Seattle Community Access Network (SCAN). Cablecasts original shows produced by local citizens.

=== Five Educational channels ===
- Puget Sound Educational Television (PSETV). Cablecasts regionally produced educational programs and Annenberg Media programs.
- The College Channel (Bellevue College). Cablecasts educational programs and Annenberg Media programs.
- University of Washington TV (UWTV). Cablecasts science lectures by the University of Washington
- University of Washington TV 2 (UW2.TV). Cablecasts NASA TV during the day (9 AM - 5 PM) and science lectures and the Research Channel in the evening and overnight (5 PM - 9 AM).
- KCTS Plus. Cablecasts Classic Arts Showcase 24 hours per day.

=== Two Government Channels ===
- The Seattle Channel. Cablecasts local government sessions and original programming produced by the station.
- TV Washington (TVW). Cablecasts Washington State Legislature sessions, similar to C-SPAN.

== See also ==
- Media in Seattle
- List of television stations in Washington (state)
- List of public-access TV stations in the United States
