= Seattle Sun =

The Seattle Sun may refer to the following newspapers in Seattle, Washington, United States:

- Seattle Sun (alternative weekly), 1974–1982, a weekly newspaper
- Seattle Sun (2002-2005), a monthly neighborhood newspaper

== See also ==
- Seattle Sun and Star (2005), bi-weekly neighborhood newspaper
