= Key Bank Tower (Everett, Washington) =

Office building in Everett, Washington

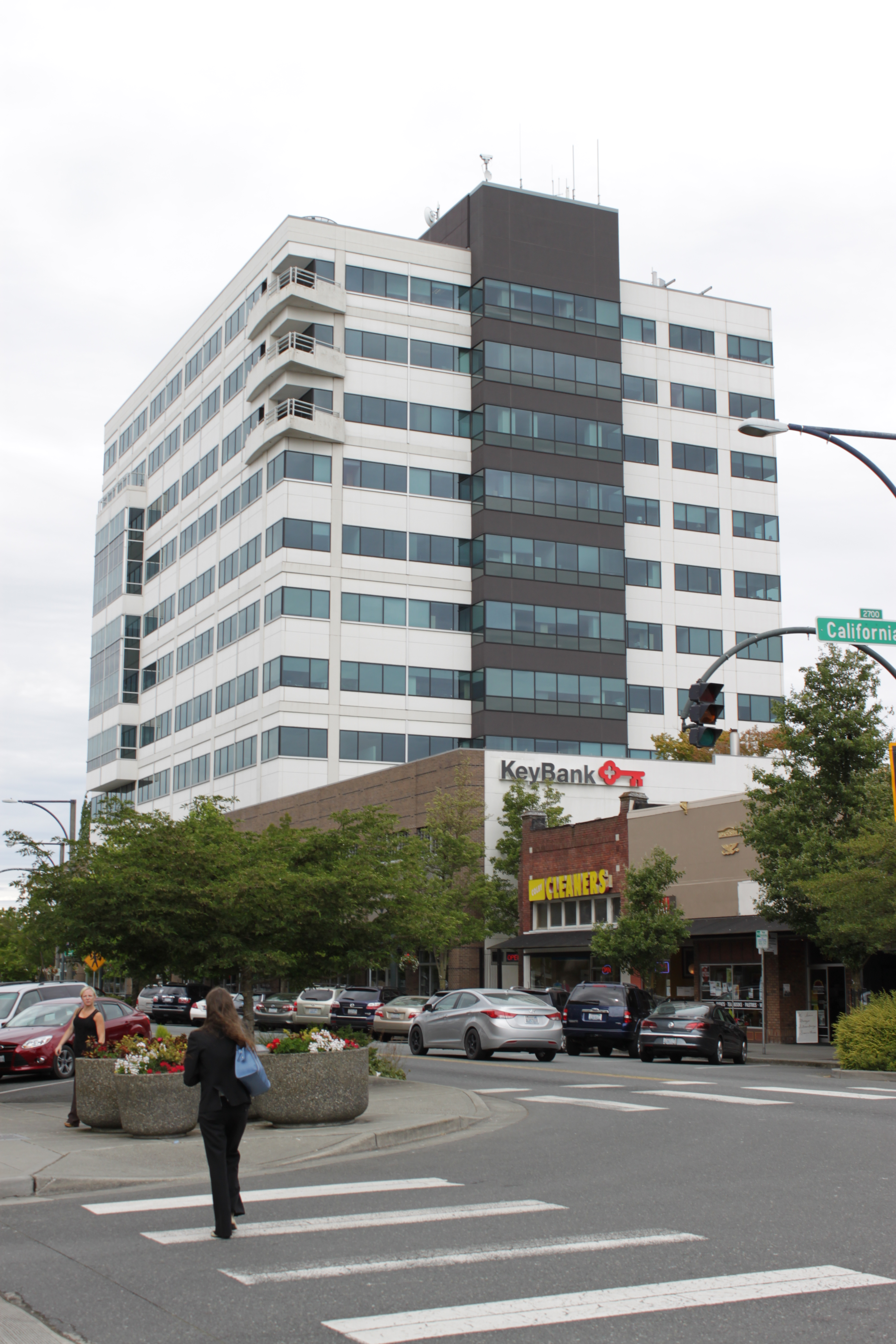
- Key Bank Tower from California Avenue in downtown Everett
- Interactive map of the Key Bank Tower area
- Former names: Everett Mutual Tower

Record height
- Tallest in Everett, Washington and Snohomish County, Washington since 1994^{[I]}
- Preceded by: Wall Street Building

General information
- Type: Commercial offices
- Location: 2707 Colby Avenue; Everett, Washington; United States
- Coordinates: 47.9815136°N 122.2081158°W
- Construction started: June 2, 1993
- Topped-out: July 8, 1994
- Completed: 1994
- Opened: 1994
- Owner: Skotdal Real Estate

Height
- Architectural: 203 feet (62 m)
- Roof: 160 feet (49 m)

Technical details
- Floor count: 11 (2 below ground)
- Floor area: 145,000 square feet (13,500 m^{2})
- Lifts/elevators: 4

Design and construction
- Architect: NBBJ
- Developer: Colby Square Partners
- Main contractor: SDL Corporation

Key Bank Tower (also known as the Everett Mutual Tower) is a 203-foot (62 m) tall high-rise office building in downtown Everett, Washington. It has been the tallest building in Everett (measured to the architectural tip) since its completion in 1994. The building originally served as the headquarters of the Everett Mutual Bank until it was acquired by KeyBank in 1998. The tower is currently occupied by Farmers Insurance, First American Insurance, KeyBank, Merrill Lynch, and Skotdal Real Estate offices as well as multiple retail outlets.

Key Bank Tower is located at 2707 Colby Avenue, adjacent to the Everett Performing Arts Center. The top floor is home to the studios of radio stations KRKO and KKXA.

== Planning and construction ==
The site was originally occupied by a Pay 'n Save store. Sears occupied the site from 1929 until 1969, when it moved into the Everett Mall. Pay 'n Save, which had shared the building with Sears, took over the vacant space and remodeled the building shortly after the latter's departure.

Key Bank Tower was originally part of the "Colby Square" development, a project intended to revitalize downtown Everett, which had declined since the construction of the Wall Street Building in 1979 as the city's growth suburbanized to the south. Announced on May 1, 1991, the project was developed by Colby Square Partners, a partnership between JDH Limited of Bellevue and Duryee Group of Everett, and designed by Seattle-based architecture firm NBBJ with funding from the AFL–CIO trust; it was later scrapped except for the building itself.

With SDL Corporation of Bellevue as the general contractor, construction started on June 2, 1993, with the demolition of the Pay 'n Save store in a groundbreaking ceremony. The building was topped off on July 8, 1994, with tenants moving in that November. The building underwent foreclosure in 1995 by the AFL–CIO trust after SDL sought payment for cost overruns due to the accelerated development schedule; it was subsequently purchased by Skotdal Real Estate in 1997.
