= Sam Cho =

American politician and entrepreneur

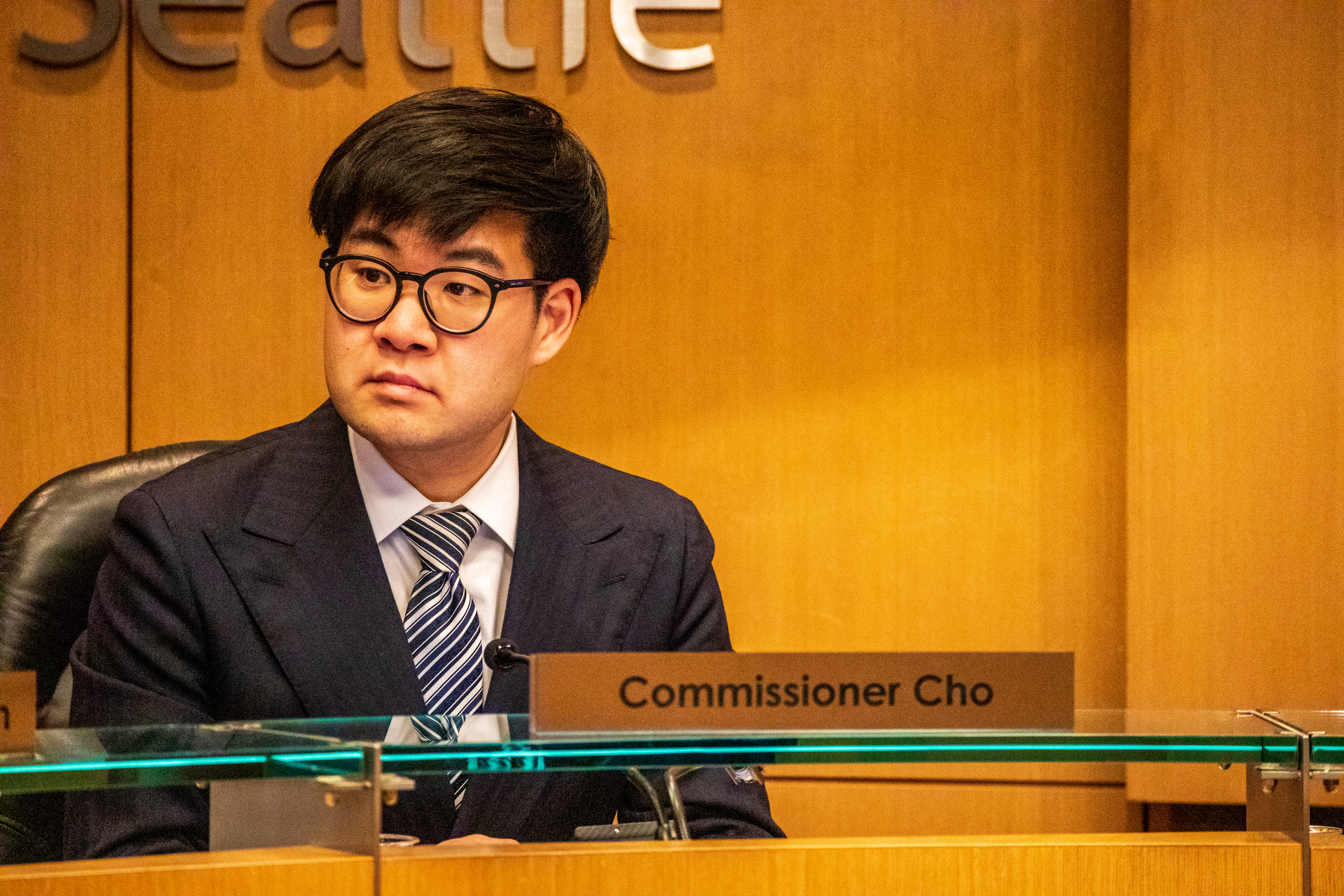
- Sam Cho in 2023

Member of the Seattle Port Commission Position 2
- Incumbent
- Assumed office January 7, 2020
- Preceded by: Courtney Gregoire

Personal details
- Born: April 24, 1990 (age 36) Chicago, Illinois, U.S.
- Education: American University (BA); London School of Economics (MS)
- Profession: Politician and entrepreneur

Sam Cho (born April 24, 1990) is an American politician and entrepreneur based in Seattle, Washington serving as a commissioner of the Port of Seattle. Prior to serving as a commissioner, he was founder and CEO of Seven Seas Export, a political appointee in the Obama administration, and a staffer for a member of the Washington State Senate and United States Congress. Cho was elected to the Seattle Port Commission in 2019, becoming the only minority port commissioner at that time. He took his oath of office in two languages, English and Korean, as a tribute to his family's immigrant roots.

Cho was listed by Seattle Magazine as one of the 25 most influential people in the region.

In 2023, Cho became the president of the Port of Seattle Commission, making him the youngest and first person of color to serve as president in the port's history.

Cho was also inducted into the Asian Hall of Fame in 2023.

== Early life and education ==
Cho was born in Chicago, Illinois, but raised in Seattle, Washington, by his immigrant parents, who came to the United States in the late 1980s through the Port of Seattle from South Korea.

Cho attended Western Washington University in his freshman year of college, but transferred to American University where Cho holds a B.A. He was member of the Pi Kappa Phi fraternity. He later attended and a received a Masters of Science degree from the London School of Economics.

== Early career ==
Cho was a congressional staffer in the U.S. House of Representatives for Congressman Ami Bera from California's 7th congressional district. He was also a special assistant in the General Services Administration.

After the Obama administration ended, he returned to his home state of Washington to start a business in international exports and work in the Washington State Legislature for Senator Bob Hasegawa.

In 2018, Cho was appointed by Governor Jay Inslee to serve as a commissioner on the Washington State Commission on Asian Pacific American Affairs (CAPAA).

== Business career ==
=== Seven Seas Export ===
In the winter of 2016, there was an opportunity to exploit the price differential of eggs in the midst of Asia's worst avian influenza (bird flu) pandemic. The bird flu wiped out chicken flocks across the region which resulted in an egg shortage. The price of eggs nearly tripled in countries like South Korea. In response, the South Korean government temporarily reduced import tariffs to 0% and subsidized freight cost to encourage egg imports to buttress the egg shortage crisis.

In February 2017, Cho founded and served as the CEO of Seven Seas Export, a trading company that took advantage of the crisis. In 2 years, Cho exported over 2.5 million pounds of American egg products to Asia.

In September 2019, Cho was a recipient of the 425 Business 30 Under 30 award.

=== Northwest Asian Weekly ===
The Northwest Asian Weekly was founded in 1983 and is one of the most widely read and most influential Asian American & Pacific Islander newspapers in the greater Seattle region. Prior to the COVID-19 pandemic in 2020, the Northwest Asian Weekly had 9,500 papers in circulation and approximately 150,000 to 200,000 monthly views on their website. In January 2023, the Northwest Asian Weekly discontinued print and went digital only.

In May 2024, founder and editor Assunta Ng announced the sale of the publication with a new generation of ownership after her retirement. Cho was announced as one of the three owners and partners in the new ownership group that took over the Northwest Asian Weekly. In the announcement, Cho stated his investment in the paper was driven mainly by the need to preserve the legacy of something that has been a staple in the community for over 40 years. Cho's vision for the publication is to expand the readership to reach the younger Millennial and Gen Z base of consumers by leveraging technology and social media platforms such as Instagram, TikTok, and YouTube, while preserving the base of legacy readers.

According to a 2023 financial disclosure report required by elected officials in the state of Washington, Cho has 25% ownership of NWAW Partners, LLC.

== Political career ==
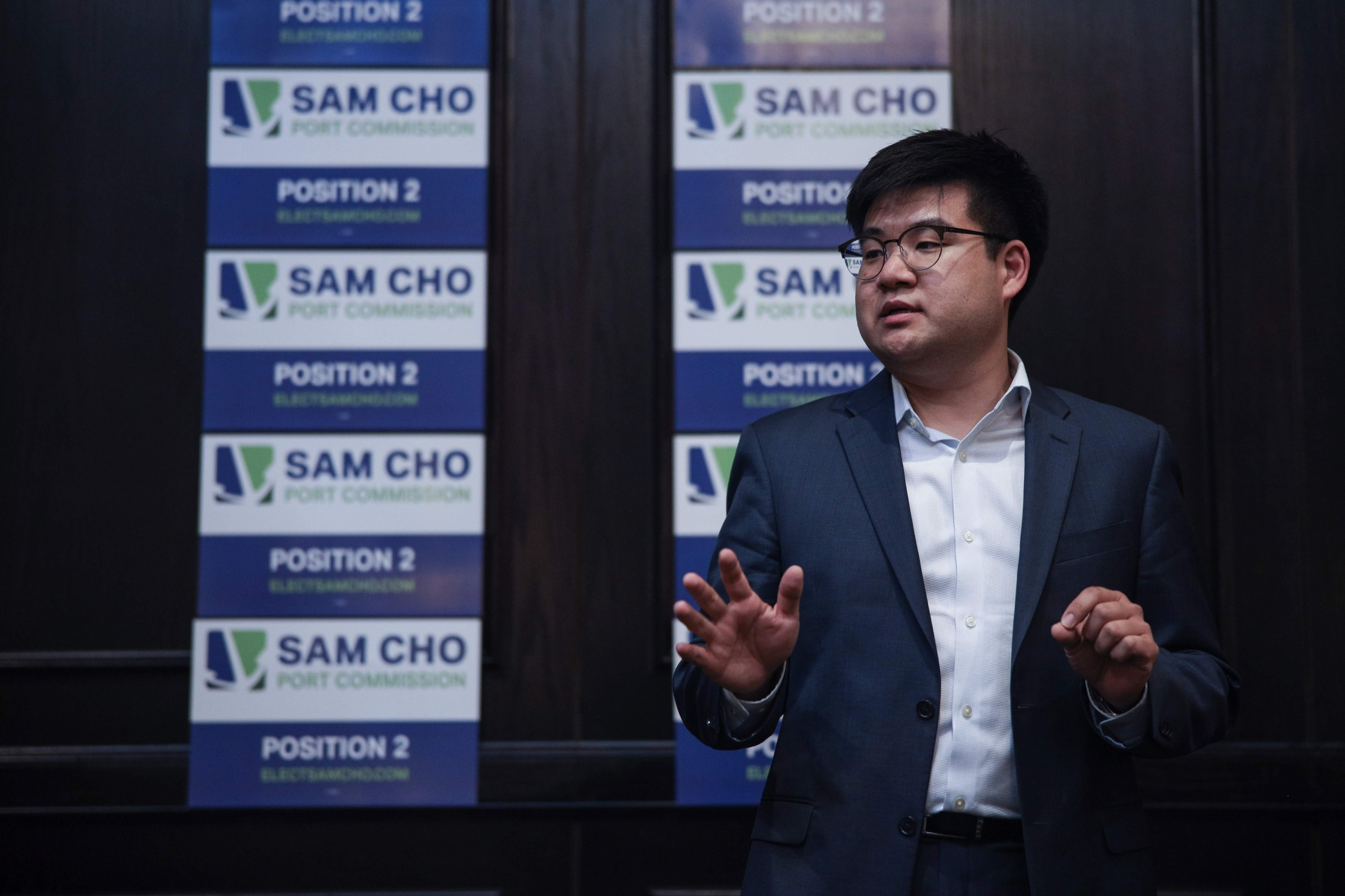
Sam Cho giving a campaign speech

=== Port of Seattle Commission ===
In May 2019, Cho announced his campaign to run and replace Courtney Gregoire on the Seattle Port Commission.

Cho's priorities included the economy, environmental sustainability, accountability, transparency, and fighting human trafficking.

Despite a primary race with six other candidates including a former mayor, Cho came first place with 31.1% of the vote to move onto the general election.

In the general election, his opponent was former City of Bellevue Mayor Grant Degginger. Cho defeated the former mayor with 60.8% of the vote, becoming the first Korean American and youngest port commissioner since the founding of the port in 1911. He was sworn in on January 7, 2020.

Cho was also endorsed by former Governor of Washington and former U.S. Secretary of Commerce Gary Locke.

In May 2023, Cho announced his re-election campaign for a second term on the port commission with over 50 endorsements including Seattle Mayor Bruce Harrell and Attorney General Bob Ferguson. He won his bid for a second term unopposed with 98.8% of the vote.

=== Trade promotion ===
Washington State is considered the most trade dependent state in the United States where an estimated 40% of jobs are tied to trade.

Cho led the effort to create an export accelerator program in partnership with the U.S. Small Business Administration, Washington State Department of Commerce, Greater Seattle partners, and the City of Seattle. The Greater Seattle Export Accelerator program provides export training, export advising services, and access to international trade opportunities for small businesses.

In September 2023, Cho was appointed by Ambassador Katherine Tai to serve on the U.S. Intergovernmental Advisory Policy Committee on Trade. The committee is composed of members who have expertise in general trade, investment, and development issues and provides policy advice to the United States Trade Representative.

=== Technology ===
During his first term, Cho pushed to adopt new technology and platforms to upgrade and modernize the travel experience at Seattle-Tacoma International Airport.

In 2021, the Port of Seattle launched a free pilot program called SEA Spot Saver that allowed passengers to make reservations for TSA security screening ahead of their flights. The virtual queue system was meant to help reduce wait times in security lines by allowing passengers to show up at their reservation times rather than stand in line. The pilot was initially with only Alaska and Delta Air Lines but was rolled out airport-wide after seeing early success.

The airport also launched Order@SEA, a mobile ordering app that allows passengers to order food from airport concessions on their phones and get it delivered to their gate.

According to Cho, "waiting in line is the least fun and most stressful part of any trip" and technology can make the airport experience a better one."

In January 2022, Seattle-Tacoma International Airport was upgraded by Skytrax to a four-star airport, becoming only the second large hub airport in the US to receive four stars. The airport was also named "Best Airport in North America" in 2022 and 2023 by Skytrax.

=== Environmental issues ===
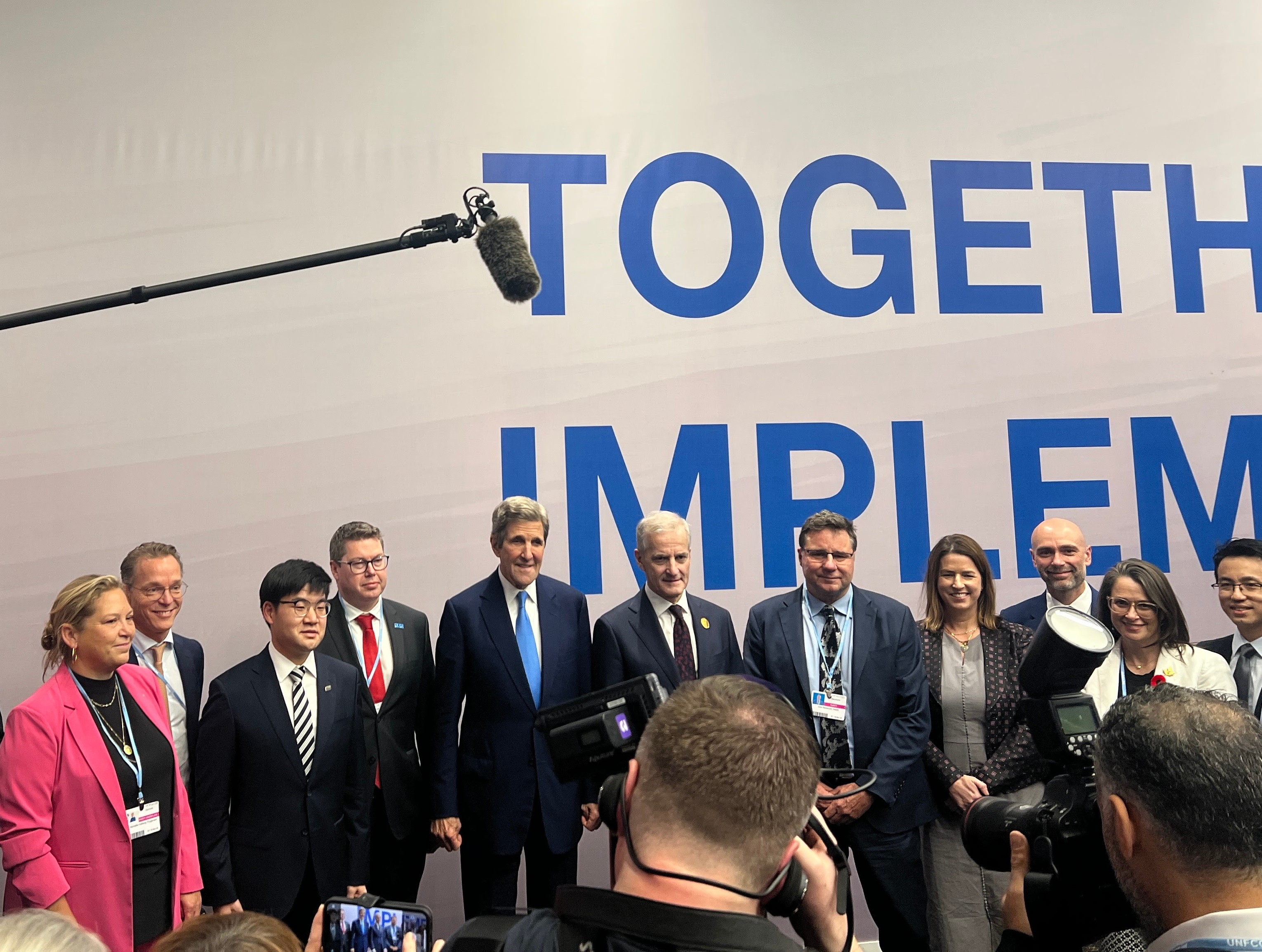
Sam Cho standing with John Kerry and other world leaders at COP 27 in Sharm-El-Sheikh, Egypt

Cho has been an advocate of strong environmental practices within and across ports industries. As a managing member of the Northwest Seaport Alliance, Cho worked in partnership with the U.S. Department of State and the U.S. Department of Energy to explore the feasibility of a "green trade corridor" between South Korea and the Pacific Northwest.

In November 2022, Cho traveled to South Korea to meet with officials of the Busan Port Authority. Immediately after, Cho traveled to Sharm-El-Sheikh, Egypt, to announce the green shipping corridor between the Port of Busan and Northwest Seaport Alliance at the United Nations COP 27 conference alongside Climate Envoy and former Secretary of State John Kerry and other world leaders.

=== Anti-human trafficking efforts ===
One of Cho's major focuses as a port commissioner has been in the area of combating human and labor trafficking. In January 2020, the Port of Seattle became the first port authority in the United States to provide proprietary training to all of the port's aviation and maritime employees on human trafficking awareness. Since the initial rollout, the Port of Seattle has received requests from other airports and port authorities to look at its model and provide similar training. Awareness campaigns resulted in higher call volumes to the National Human Trafficking Hotline, which Cho considers a positive outcome as it indicates more people are reaching out for help or reporting suspicious activity.

In 2022, the Port of Seattle received the U.S. Department of Transportation's Combating Human Trafficking in Transportation Impact Award.

In July 2023, Cho was appointed by Secretary Pete Buttigieg to the U.S. Department of Transportation's Advisory Committee on Human Trafficking. This elevated the Port of Seattle's efforts on anti-human trafficking to the national level. Cho stated in an interview that anti-human trafficking is one of the pillars of his work because so many victims are from the Asian diaspora.

=== Airline catering worker minimum wage ===
Cho publicly endorsed and supported efforts to provide airline flight kitchen workers a $16 minimum wage at the Seattle-Tacoma International Airport (Seatac). Flight kitchen workers were initially exempt from Seatac's Proposition 1 minimum wage ordinance because of jurisdictional issues. Cho provided public testimony in the Washington State Legislature in support of Senate Bill 6217 which gave the ports the authority to set minimum labor standards for certain employees at an airport.

=== Equity, diversity, and inclusion ===
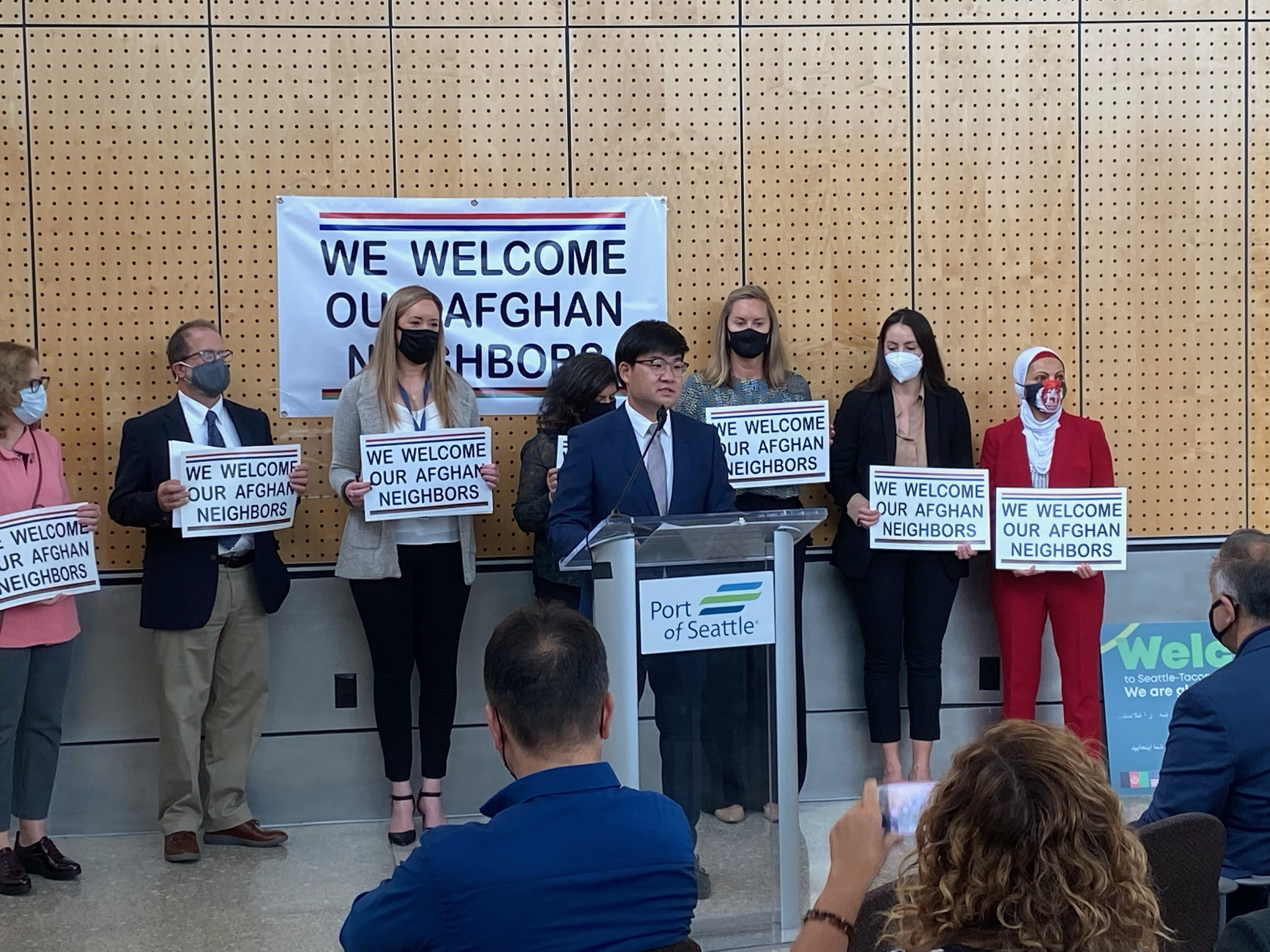
Sam Cho announcing the SEA Welcome Center for Afghan refugees at Seattle-Tacoma International Airport

In October 2020, Cho introduced and passed a motion on racial equity and addressing structural racism at the port. The motion assessed port policies to address systemic or institutionalized biases. It also mandated unconscious bias training across the organization and established a community advisory board.

=== Afghan refugee crisis ===
When President Joe Biden announced the full withdrawal of the United States Armed Forces from Afghanistan in July 2021, a crisis of refugees fleeing from the Taliban ensued. The Port of Seattle worked immediately to establish a space within Seattle-Tacoma International Airport to aid with the refugee resettlement efforts. Cho referenced his own family's difficulties immigrating to the United States as a reason for why the port needed to serve as a welcoming environment for refugees.

The established space was called the SEA Welcome Center and provided an area for resettlement agencies to welcome and assist refugees. The opening of the center was announced at a press conference with Cho and Washington State Governor Jay Inslee in October 2021 at the airport.

== Awards and recognition ==
- 2019, 425 Business Magazine "30 under 30" Award
- 2020, New America "Next-Generation Asian American Pacific Islander Foreign Policy and National Security Leaders"
- 2021, Seattle Met "100 of the Most Influential People in Seattle"
- 2022, American University "Rising Star" Alumni Award
- 2023, Seattle Magazine "Seattle's Most Influential People"
- 2023, Asian Hall of Fame Inductee

== Other affiliations ==
A member of the Council on Foreign Relations, Cho also serves on the Advisory Council for the Asia Society Seattle Center, the Asian Pacific American Institute for Congressional Studies (APAICS), as well as on several boards, including those of the Seattle Symphony and Verity Credit Union.

Cho is also on the Forbes Business Council.
