= Richard Lee (journalist) =

American journalist (born 1963)

- Born: 1963 (age 62–63); New York City, United States
- Occupations: Journalist, Public Access host
- Years active: 1994-Present
- Known for: Conspiracy theories regarding Kurt Cobain

Richard Lee is an independent journalist from Seattle, Washington, United States. He is best known for his conspiracy theories regarding the 1994 death of Kurt Cobain which he states that he believes was a homicide. Lee was the first to make this claim. Lee is also known for his attempts at various political offices and using related events to question political figures about the investigation into Kurt Cobain's death.

== Background ==
Born in New York in 1963, Lee grew up in Chicago and at a young age began writing for the Chicago Reader. In 1982, he wrote the article "Playing for Change". Some time after the story was published, the city council overturned the law and legalized street performances. Lee also wrote for the University of Washington student newspaper, The Daily.

== Life in Seattle ==
Lee moved to Seattle in the early 1990s in search of an underdeveloped political climate. He began a short-lived career with the Seattle Weekly, a local alternative paper. After leaving the Weekly, Lee began a weekly public affairs show on Public-access television cable TV, Now See It Person to Person, a homage to See It Now, the historic investigative reporting show of Edward R. Murrow.

Lee's cable television show was removed from SCAN permanently in April 2008.

== Investigations into Kurt Cobain ==
After the death of Kurt Cobain in 1994, Lee's coverage of the death led him to raise questions regarding the circumstances of Cobain's demise. The official police investigation, under police chief Norm Stamper, concluded that Cobain had died of an apparent suicide. Lee is one of a number of individuals who promote the belief that Cobain likely did not commit suicide, but must have been killed by someone else.

Lee changed the name of his show to Now See It Person to Person: Was Kurt Cobain Murdered?, then to the more definitive Now See It Person To Person: Kurt Cobain Was Murdered. Since then Lee has referred to his show and his related journalism and political activities by the abbreviation KCWM. Since 1994, with occasional involuntary hiatuses, the show has aired weekly and continues to investigate the Cobain case as well as somewhat related and prominent matters of Seattle public affairs.

Lee has appeared in some documentaries about Cobain, such as the BBC's Rock Shrines and Conspiracies TV shows. Lee's confrontational style has led to frequent encounters with police officers and other local figures. Lee is protective of his film, and if confiscated, he often fights in court to have the original copy returned to him.

== Politics ==
Lee has run for a number of political offices in Seattle. He ran for Seattle City Council in 1999, but a judge ruled him ineligible because he reused old petition signatures to get on the ballot.

=== Mayoral run ===
In 2001, Lee ran for mayor of the city of Seattle against incumbent mayor Paul Schell, but lost to Greg Nickels. Lee was critical of the way Schell's office responded to the WTO protests in 1999. He was the only candidate that year to gather enough signatures to be on the ballot without having to pay the filling fee.

While running for mayor in 2001, Lee showed up to a mayoral candidates' forum in a dress. He used the opportunity to question Greg Nickels about a supposed cover-up regarding the investigation of the death of Kurt Cobain.

== Notable incidents ==
In 2000, Krist Novoselic was granted a restraining order against Richard Lee, which expired in 2005.

In 2004, Lee was arrested in Los Angeles at a court hearing for Courtney Love, in which he attempted to ask questions about killing her husband. The incident was covered in entertainment media, especially on Celebrity Justice.

During the 2005 campaign, Greg Nickels got a mild restraining order against Lee, citing Lee's ambush interview practices over the past years as harassment. Nickel's lawyers, employed by the city, wanted a standard 500-foot restriction from the mayor's home and workplace, which would include city hall. The judge in the case kept the home restriction, but minimized the order to one floor of city hall and to a 50-foot radius in public places and events.

Part of the motivation for the restraining order was Lee's attempt to interview the mayor at a Democratic Party event in Fremont to which many Seattle residents including Lee had been invited. Lee was ejected from the grounds by the owner, but remained on the sidewalk trying to ask questions of the mayor. As the mayor was about to leave, Lee was restrained by a plainclothes police officer that Lee then allegedly kicked in the leg. Lee pleaded not guilty, maintaining that it was he who was assaulted by the officer. During pretrial hearings, he succeeded in forcing the Seattle Police Department to return the original copy of his videotape of the incident, which they had confiscated, and refused to return over concerns of publicity. In 2008, the city was ordered to return the original videotape, which Lee then aired on his program; later that year the city dropped the charges against Lee.
