= Northwest Vietnamese News =

Người Việt Tây Bắc
- Type: Weekly Newspaper
- Format: Print, Digital, Online, Video, Social Media
- Owner(s): Kim Van Pham and Hang Nga Pham
- Founder(s): Kim Van Pham and Hang Nga Pham
- Publisher: Kim Van Pham
- Founded: Dec. 5, 1986
- Language: Vietnamese and English
- Headquarters: Westminster, California, Seattle, Wa
- Website: http://www.nvnorthwest.com

Người Việt Tây Bắc (English: Northwest Vietnamese News) is a privately owned Vietnamese-language newspaper founded in Washington state. It is an affiliate of the Người Việt Daily News.

Người Việt Tây Bắc translates to the” Vietnamese people of the Northwest.” The paper publishes news stories about social issues, the economy, politics, and culture relevant to overseas Vietnamese in the United States, particularly in Washington.

Founded in 1986 by Kim Văn Phạm, a journalist in the Republic of Vietnam Navy during the Vietnam War, and his wife Hằng Nga Phạm. It is the longest-running Vietnamese language newspaper in the Pacific Northwest, published once a week.

== History ==
Người Việt Tây Bắc was established in 1986 as a response to the growing need for a local Vietnamese-language press in the Seattle-Tacoma area owing to the influx of Vietnamese refugees in the region.

In 1986, Người Việt Daily provided startup loans for Vietnamese newspapers in Seattle, San Diego, and San Jose. Kim Pham told the Seattle Times that founding the newspaper was possible because of “a chain of seven Vietnamese-exile newspapers in the U.S. and Europe that pool the resources of 40 investors and share stories by computer modem.”

The newspaper office was first established on an empty lot currently occupied by a church, near the Franklin high school area where immigrants started settling in after the Vietnam War. In 2001, it was moved further south on the Martin Luther King Jr Way corridor that runs through the heart of south Seattle, next to the current day Othello Light Rail Station.

The first edition of the paper was a 32-page publication, printed on Dec. 5, 1986. By 1989, it had “1,200 subscribers, some 30 regular contributors, six paid workers, four advisory-board members, and a host of volunteers.

Within the next few years, Người Việt Tây Bắc started publishing 100 pages of local business and political news, community announcements, digested international reports, how-to advice on American ways, and op-eds per issue.

During the 1990s, when the Vietnamese population rose in Seattle, Kim and Hang Pham began publishing a weekday edition in addition to the regular Friday edition.

In 1995, the newspaper started a Tuesday edition, which ran until 2011. Kim and Hang’s oldest and second oldest children, Julie and Andy Pham bought the Tuesday edition from their parents in 2009 and ran it until its closure in 2012 because of financial pressures from the recession.

From 1989 to 2013, they also printed a Vietnamese Business and Services Directory for businesses in Washington, Oregon, and British Columbia.

In 2002, Người Việt Tây Bắc launched a TV broadcast program on Saigon Broadcasting Television Network (SBTN) covering local issues faced by the Vietnamese community in Washington state. The video clips live on a separate NW Vietnamese News YouTube site.

Today, the newspaper operations are handled by the couple with the assistance of their three children - Julie (Hoài Hương), Andy (An), and Don (Bảo) Pham.

Kim Van Pham was honored at “We the People” by the International Channel Networks on September 25, 2002, and by the Northwest Asian Weekly as a Top Contributor to the Asian Community in its annual Top Contributors Awards Dinner on Dec. 2, 2016, held at House of Hong Restaurant in the International District.
