= Eastern Hotel =

Historic building in Seattle, Washington, U.S.

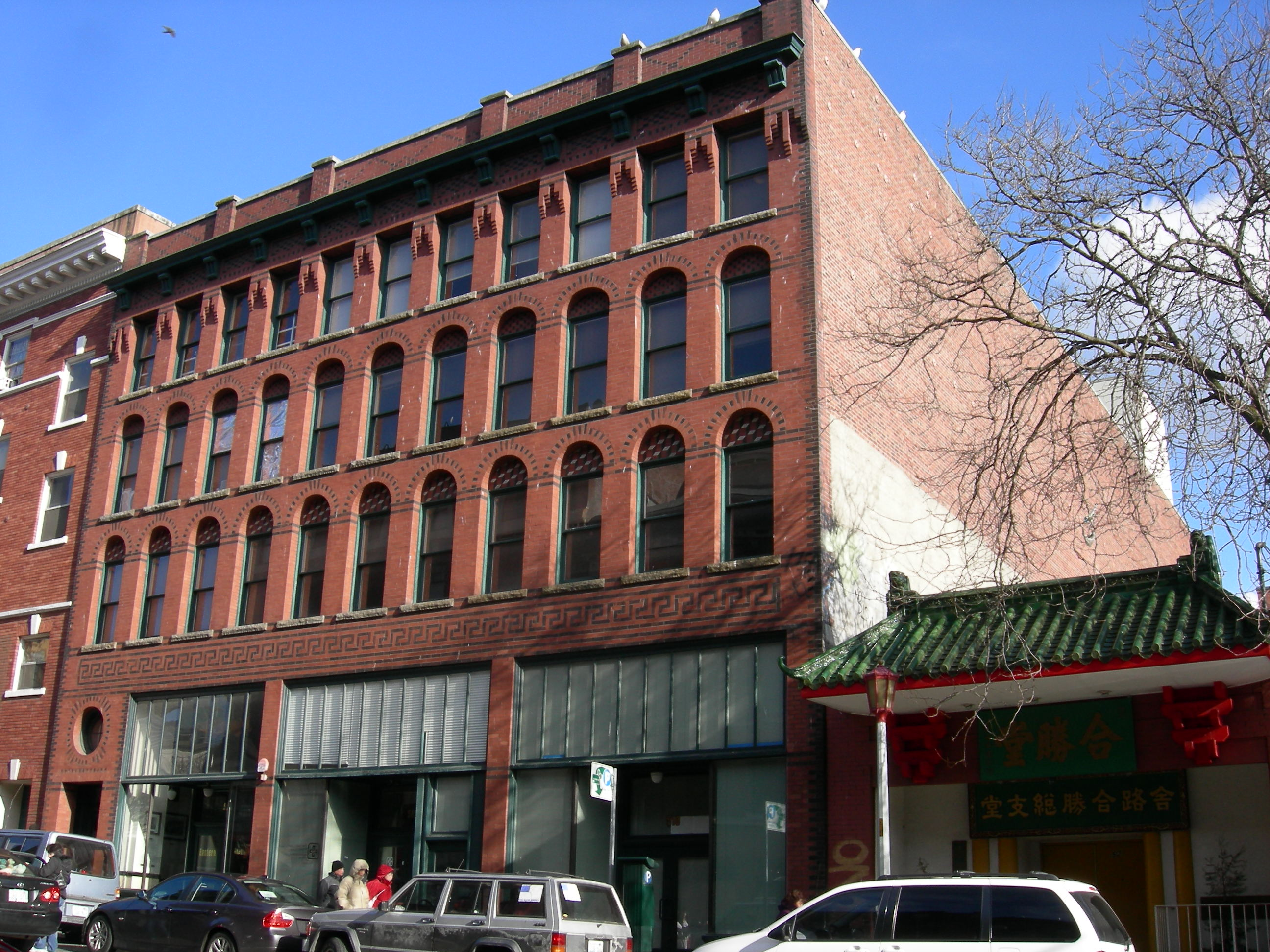
- The building's exterior in 2008
- Interactive map of the Eastern Hotel area

General information
- Location: Seattle, Washington, U.S.
- Coordinates: 47°35′53″N 122°19′29″W

The Eastern Hotel is a historic building in Seattle's Chinatown–International District, in the U.S. state of Washington. Located at 506 Maynard Avenue S, the structure was commissioned by Chun Ching Hock for the Wa Chong Company and built by contractor David Dow in 1911. The building has been designated a historical landmark and "won a distinguished award for affordable housing" from the Seattle chapter of the American Institute of Architects.

The building housed Eastern Cafe, until 2023.

== See also ==
- List of Seattle landmarks
