= Ballard News-Tribune =

- Type: Weekly newspaper
- Owner: Robinson Newspapers
- Publisher: Jerry Robinson (Publisher Emeritus 1951-2014)
- Editor: Kenneth Robinson
- Founded: 1891
- Headquarters: 5158 S. 170th Street; Seattle, Washington, U.S.
- Circulation: 9,500
- ISSN: 1535-914X
- OCLC number: 17243228
- Website: www.ballardnewstribune.com

The Ballard News-Tribune is a weekly newspaper serving the Ballard neighborhood of Seattle, Washington. It was founded in 1891 and has a circulation of 9,500. It is one of the Robinson Newspapers, a group of newspapers in the Seattle-Tacoma area which includes the West Seattle Herald, White Center News, Highline Times, Des Moines News, SeaTac News, and Federal Way News. It offers local news coverage from Seattle to north Tacoma.

On August 21, 2013, it was announced that the paper, along with the West Seattle Herald, White Center News, and Highline Times, would be combined into The Westside Weekly as of September 6.
