= West Seattle Herald =

American former newspaper

Coordinates: 47.477231°N 122.33296°W

- Owner: Robinson Newspapers
- Founder: Jerry Robinson
- Publisher: Robinson Family
- Editor-in-chief: Kenneth Robinson
- Founded: 1923
- Language: English
- Headquarters: Seattle
- Sister newspapers: Ballard News-Tribune, White Center News, Highline Times, Des Moines News, SeaTac News, Federal Way News
- ISSN: 2160-3642
- OCLC number: 304627581
- Website: WestSeattleHerald.com

The West Seattle Herald is a newspaper serving West Seattle, Seattle, Washington. Since 2013, it has been a part of Westside Seattle.

== History ==
The West Seattle Herald was founded in 1923.

In 2013, Robinson Newspapers made the West Seattle Herald part of The Westside Weekly, along with the Ballard News-Tribune, the Highline Times, and White Center News. The Westside Weekly was renamed to Westside Seattle in June 2017.

In 2014, Amanda Knox began writing for the paper.

On April 30, 2021, Westside Seattle (which the West Seattle Herald was part of) published its final print issue while continuing to maintain an online presence.
