= University of Washington Television =

American educational television service

- Country: United States
- Headquarters: Seattle, Washington

Programming
- Language: English

Ownership
- Owner: University of Washington Board of Regents

History
- Launched: 1994; 32 years ago
- Closed: December 31, 2016; 9 years ago

Links
- Website: uwtv.org

University of Washington Television (UWTV) is an educational television service from the University of Washington (UW), originating from Seattle. Through online and mobile distribution formats, UWTV serves as an ambassador to the scholarship, discoveries and breakthrough science of the nation's top-ranked public research university, and also showcases campus culture, from sports to student activities. Programs are available online through video on demand and podcasting at uwtv.org, as well as YouTube and iTunes U.

== History ==
Since its inception as a linear cable television channel in 1994, UWTV has received numerous regional and national awards for excellence in production and programming content created by UWTV's on-campus television professionals. By 2000 the station was available by cable in several cities.

In 1999 YES-TV operated by the Yakima Valley Technical Skills Center, created a new $1.2 million studio and entered an agreement to have its programs broadcast by UWTV.

In 2000 UWTV, which had been available via cable in much of the state for a decade, began broadcasting over cable in Tacoma. December 31, 2016, UWTV discontinued its linear cable television channel, preferring to focus on its website distribution and continued video production for the UW and surrounding community.

As of January 1, 2017, the University of Washington ended the television broadcast of UWTV.

== Programs ==
In 2000, The News Tribune reported that the bulk of the channel's programming was broadcasts of lectures and seminars. It televised major events at the University, such as the 2008 appearance of the Dalai Lama.

The first live video from the sea floor of the Strait of Juan de Fuca was broadcast by UWTV in 2005, showing a live view of the 700 °F (371 °C) geothermal heated waters under study by UW oceanographers John Delaney and Deborah Kelley, as part of the Visions 2005 expedition.

== Awards ==
UWTV, Patrick Witt, Greg Young, and Kathy Medak, were nominated for a Northwest Emmy Award for a one-time sports special, "Husky Softball: A Championship Journey.

In 2017, UWTV, Cara Podenski, Eric Chudler, and Lionel Flynn won a Northwest Emmy Award for "BrainWorks: Exercise and the Brain" in the Health/Science program category. in 2023, UWTV, Cara Podenski, Eric Chudler and Dave Ris won a Northwest Regional Emmy Award for the program, "BrainWorks – Vision and the Brain".
