= KRKO =

Radio station in Everett, Washington

- Everett, Washington; United States
- Broadcast area: Seattle metropolitan area
- Frequency: 1380 kHz

Programming
- Format: Classic Hits
- Affiliations: Everett Silvertips; Everett AquaSox; Vancouver Canucks

Ownership
- Owner: S-R Broadcasting Co., Inc.
- Sister stations: KKXA

History
- First air date: August 17, 1922
- Former call signs: KFBL (1922–1934); KRKO (1934–1985); KBAE (1985–1986); KRFE (1986–1987)
- Former frequencies: 833 kHz (1922–1923); 1340 kHz (1923–1928); 1370 kHz (1928–1941); 1400 kHz (1941–1950)
- Call sign meaning: "Krokodile" (slogan adopted in the 1950s)

Technical information
- Licensing authority: FCC
- Facility ID: 62056
- Class: B
- Power: 50,000 watts
- Transmitter coordinates: 47°52′31.4″N 122°4′42.6″W
- Translator: 95.3 K237GN (Everett)

Links
- Public license information: Public file; LMS
- Webcast: Listen Live
- Website: KRKO Online

KRKO (1380 AM) is a commercial radio station licensed to Everett, Washington. The station broadcasts a classic hits radio format to the Seattle metropolitan area. The station was established in 1922, and is currently owned by S-R Broadcasting Co., Inc., a locally-based company.

KRKO broadcasts on a regional frequency of 1380 kHz with 50,000 watts, the maximum power for United States AM radio stations. The signal is non-directional during daytime hours, but employs a directional antenna at night, in order to avoid interfering with other stations. KRKO broadcasts using HD Radio technology alongside its analog signal. Programming is also heard on a 250-watt FM translator, K237GN at 95.3 MHz in Everett.

== Programming ==
KRKO calls its format "Everett's Greatest Hits," mostly playing songs from the 1970s and 80s. Brian Mengle hosts mornings, with other local DJs heard around the clock. To help listeners identify the music, each song is "tagged" with the name of the artist and title at its conclusion.

While carrying a music-based format, KRKO also covers local and regional sports in Western Washington, including high school football and basketball from Snohomish County. Live play-by-play affiliations include the Everett AquaSox, a minor league affiliate of the Seattle Mariners; the Everett Silvertips of the Western Hockey League; and the Vancouver Canucks of the National Hockey League. KRKO also carries two racing networks, Motor Racing Network (MRN Radio) and Performance Racing Network (PRN Radio). Two of the local sportscasters are Bill Kusler and Tom Lafferty.

== History ==
=== Early broadcasts ===
From 1912 to 1927 radio communication in the United States was regulated by the Department of Commerce, and originally there were no formal requirements for stations. Most operated under Amateur and Experimental licenses, making broadcasts intended for the general public. In order to provide a common standard, the department issued a regulation effective December 1, 1921, requiring that broadcasting stations would now have to hold a Limited Commercial license that authorized operation on two designated broadcasting wavelengths: 360 meters (833 kHz) for "entertainment", and 485 meters (619 kHz) for "market and weather reports".

The first Everett broadcasting station authorization was issued on June 12, 1922 to Kinney Brothers & Sipprell for KDZZ. It operated on 360 meters. Because there was only the single entertainment wavelength, stations in a given region had to develop timesharing arrangements for broadcasts on the shared 360 meter wavelength.

=== KFBL ===
The first license for the station, as KFBL, was issued on August 17, 1922. It was assigned to the Leese Brothers and also broadcast on 360 meters, as Everett's second station. The original KFBL license is posted on a wall at the current station. The KFBL call letters were randomly assigned from an alphabetical roster of available call signs. Otto and Robert Leese started the radio station on the second floor of their auto repair shop on 28th and Rucker in downtown Everett.

In mid-1923, the station was assigned to 1340 kHz. On November 11, 1928, under the provisions of the Federal Radio Commission's General Order 40, KFBL was assigned to 1370 kHz, on a timesharing basis with KVL (later KEEN and KEVR) in Seattle.

=== KRKO ===
The Leese brothers transferred control of the station to their engineer, Lee Mudgett, in 1934. He changed the call letters to KRKO. In 1940, KRKO was reported to be the last remaining U.S. station operating with a power of only 50 watts.

A 1940 review by the Federal Communications Commission (FCC) found that, under Mudgett's ownership, KRKO was badly managed and financially unstable. Therefore, it initially denied the station's license renewal and its proposed license assignment to the Everett Broadcasting Company, which was controlled by the Taft family. However, the FCC later relented, and approved both applications.

In March 1941, most stations on 1370 kHz, including KRKO and its timeshare partner KEVR in Seattle, were moved to 1400 kHz, as part of the implementation of the North American Regional Broadcasting Agreement (NARBA). The next year KRKO was authorized to began fulltime operation, after KEVR moved to 1090 kHz. In 1950, KRKO moved to the station's current frequency of 1380 kHz.

KRKO remained under Taft family ownership until the late 1970s. The Taft's Washington, D.C. attorney, John Marple, operated KRKO with some investors for a few years. In the early 1980s, an Everett area investment group led by a local beer distributor, Niles Fowler, acquired control of the station. Control was transferred back to a member of the Taft family following a sale of the station in 1983, but in 1987 new local investors Art Skotdal and Roy Robinson purchased the KRKO assets and the Skotdal family continues to operate KRKO today.

=== Sports and new towers ===
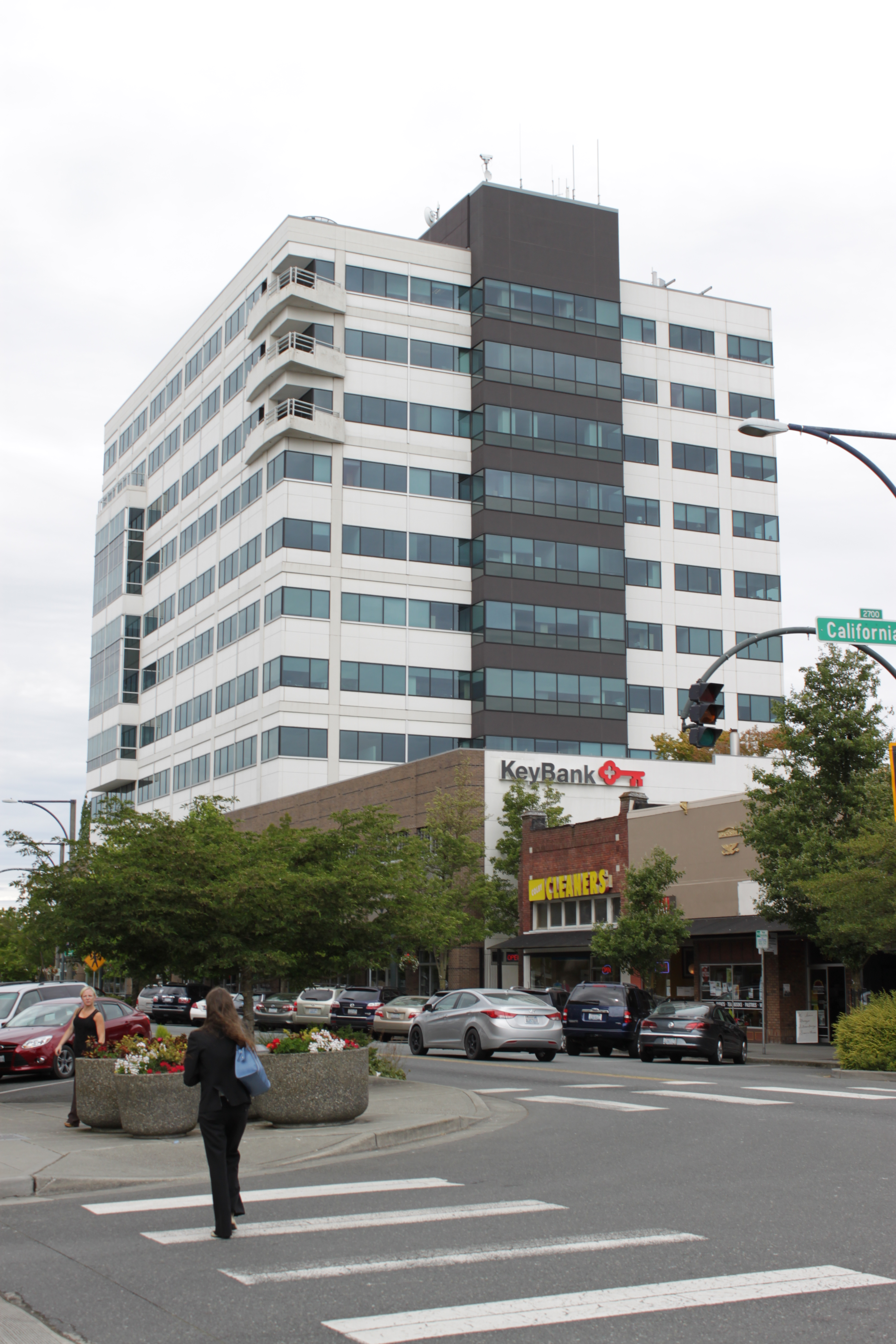
KRKO moved their studios and offices to Everett Mutual Tower (now Key Bank Tower) in 1998

KRKO moved their studios and offices from Lowell to the top floor of the Everett Mutual Tower (now Key Bank Tower), the tallest building in the city, in December 1998. The station had begun to add more sports radio programming and became affiliated with ESPN Radio. The station switched to digital broadcasting in January 1999 and spent $7,000 to prepare for potential glitches at the turn of the millennium. In January 2000, KRKO began producing its own local news broadcasts to supplement its traffic reports and syndicated national news broadcasts from CNN Radio and later Fox News Network. The station transitioned fully into a sports talk format in 2002 and affiliated with Fox Sports Radio.

In October 2000, the station applied to construct eight freestanding radio towers adjacent to the Snohomish River west of Monroe that would range in height from 425 to 466 feet (130 to 142 m). KRKO aimed to reach a wider area that covered the entirety of Snohomish County and compete with Seattle-based stations that drew away their audience during commutes into King County. A citizens' group formed to oppose the construction of the proposed towers on claims that it would pose dangers to the environment, birds, and pilots at nearby Harvey Airfield, as well as cause "visual blight" near two county parks. The Snohomish County government issued a determination of nonsignificance for the project in 2001, which was appealed by the citizens' group and the owners of Harvey Airfield.

KRKO modified their proposal to reduce the height of the tallest tower to 349 feet (106 m) and most of the towers to 20 feet (6.1 m) in April 2002 as part of an agreement with Harvey Airfield to drop their appeal. The Snohomish County hearing examiner ruled in favor of the citizens' group later that year. The county government issued an environmental impact statement for the radio towers in early 2005 that approved the modified design, but the citizens' group once again filed an appeal. A new permit was granted by a 4–1 vote of the Snohomish County Council in May 2006 for a scaled-down, four-tower version of the proposal. Following another appeal from the citizens' group, the approval of the permits was upheld by a King County Superior Court judge in January 2007.

Construction of the four new radio towers began on August 21, 2007, with plans to apply for additional towers to accommodate a second station. A federal permit was issued by the FCC on May 30, 2008. The new towers were activated in February 2009, boosting the broadcasting power of KRKO to 34,000 watts during the day and 50,000 watts at night with an expected range from Tacoma to Mount Vernon. Two of the radio towers were toppled by vandals on September 4. A sign left at the scene claimed that the eco-terrorist group Earth Liberation Front was responsible for the toppling. The station transferred its radio transmission to a backup site and remained on the air at reduced power. KRKO operated from the damaged site at full daytime power and reduced nighttime power until both destroyed towers were replaced on August 16, 2010.

=== Classic Hits ===
On October 4 and 5, 2014, KRKO was the only radio station in North America broadcasting a 100% digital signal during tests made for NAB Labs, a division of the National Association of Broadcasters. KRKO suspended analog transmissions for eight hours on Saturday and four hours on Sunday for daytime and nighttime tests. KRKO was the fourth commercial AM station in North America to test all-digital daytime transmissions.

On July 9, 2018, KRKO changed format to a blend of oldies and classic hits. Along with the music, much of the live play-by-play sporting events previously heard during the all-sports format were retained. Over time, the station's focus moved to 1970s and 80s hits.

== Translator ==
Broadcast translator for KRKO
Call sign	Frequency	City of license	FID	ERP (W)	HAAT	Class	Transmitter coordinates	FCC info
K237GN	95.3 FM	Everett, Washington	24670	250	0 m (0 ft)	D	47°55′46″N 122°14′56″W	LMS
