= Seattle Chinese Post =

Chinese American newspaper

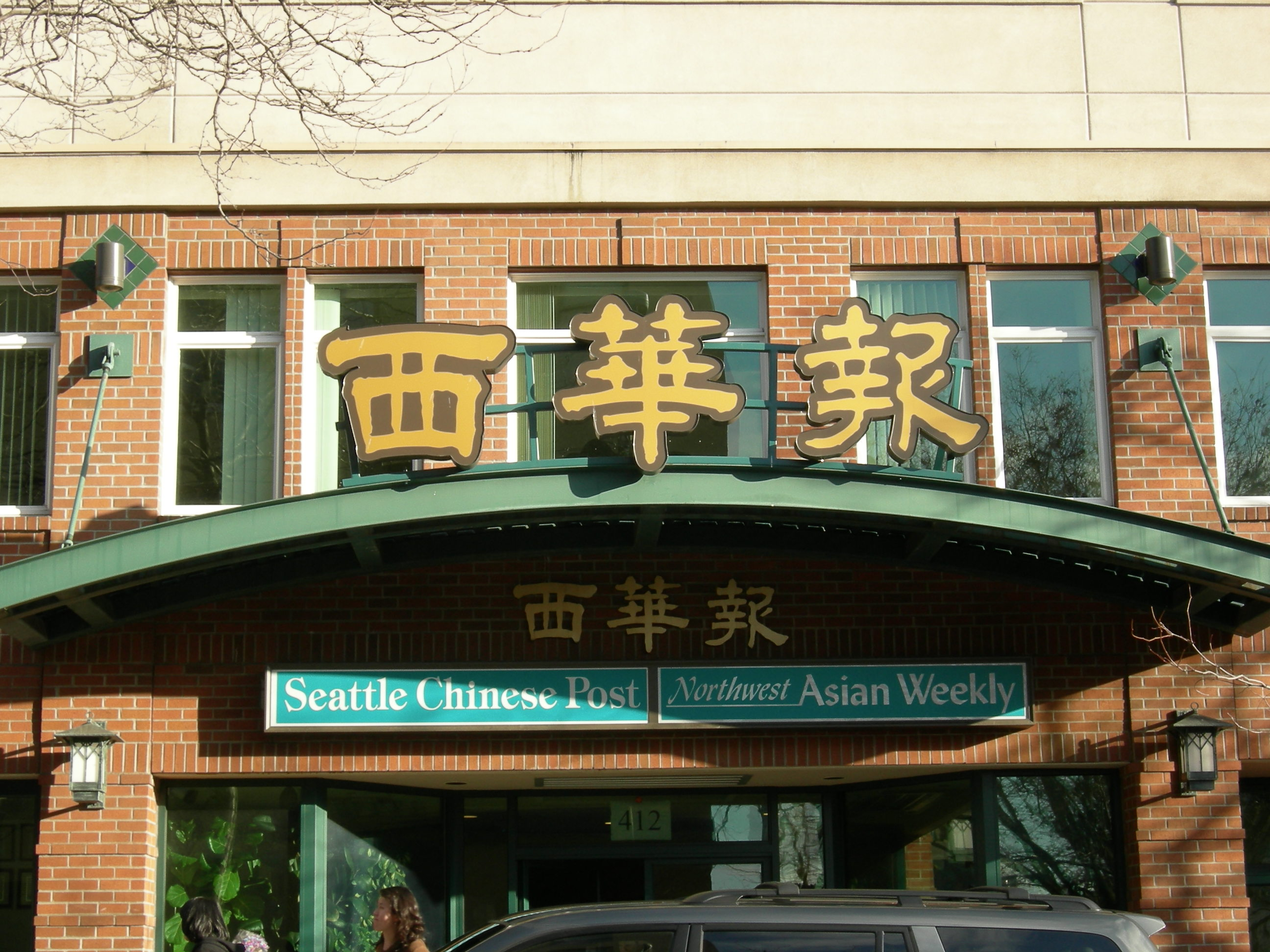
- Headquarters of the Seattle Chinese Post and Northwest Asian Weekly (2007)
- Type: Weekly newspaper
- Format: Tabloid
- Founder: Assunta Ng
- Publisher: Assunta Ng
- Founded: January 20, 1982
- Language: Chinese
- Headquarters: Seattle, Washington
- Sister newspapers: Northwest Asian Weekly
- Website: seattlechinesepost.com

The Seattle Chinese Post (traditional Chinese: 西華報; simplified Chinese: 西华报; pinyin: Xī Huá Bào; Jyutping: Sai1 Waa4 Bou3) is an online Chinese-language newspaper based in Seattle, Washington's International District. It was founded on 1982 by Assunta Ng, also founder of the Northwest Asian Weekly. At the time of its founding, it was the first Chinese-language newspaper published in the Pacific Northwest since 1927.

== History ==
The Seattle Chinese Post was founded by Assunta Ng. It was given its name in December 1981 by community members in the surrounding International District in an "open-naming" contest. Originally headquartered in the Bush Hotel in the International District, The Seattle Chinese Post's first issue was published January 20, 1982. The first issue consisted primarily of advertisements because, at the time, Chinese characters had to be manually typed and typesetters used a bulky and noisy tool imported from Taiwan.

In September 1982, The Seattle Chinese Post expanded its English-language coverage from two articles an issue to a full four-page insert. This insert grew and became The Seattle Chinese Post's sister paper, Northwest Asian Weekly, which was officially launched on February 5, 1983.

In 1985, The Seattle Chinese Post and Northwest Asian Weekly launched the first Seattle Chinese Yellow Pages.

In 1986, Ng's husband, George Liu, joined The Seattle Chinese Post and Northwest Asian Weekly as a full-time manager.

In 1987, The Seattle Chinese Post moved its offices from the Bush Hotel to the former site of the Wing Luke Museum.

On December 29, 2022, the paper announced it will cease print and online operations. Its final print issue was on January 21, 2023. The Northwest Asian Weekly also ceased print but its website will continue to be updated for the foreseeable future.

In September 2023, it was announced The Seattle Chinese Post was to resume publishing articles online on October 5 after the newspaper's owner Assunta Ng donated it to the Tacoma-based nonprofit Asia Pacific Cultural Center. Three former contributors will write for the website.

== Content ==
The Seattle Chinese Post focuses on covering mainstream news in Chinese.
