= Seattle Daily Journal of Commerce =

- Helping Business do Business Since 1893
- Type: Daily newspaper (excluding Sundays)
- Publisher: Phil Brown
- Founded: 1895
- Language: English
- Headquarters: 83 Columbia Street; Seattle, Washington
- Circulation: 1,500 (as of 2023)
- Website: djc.com

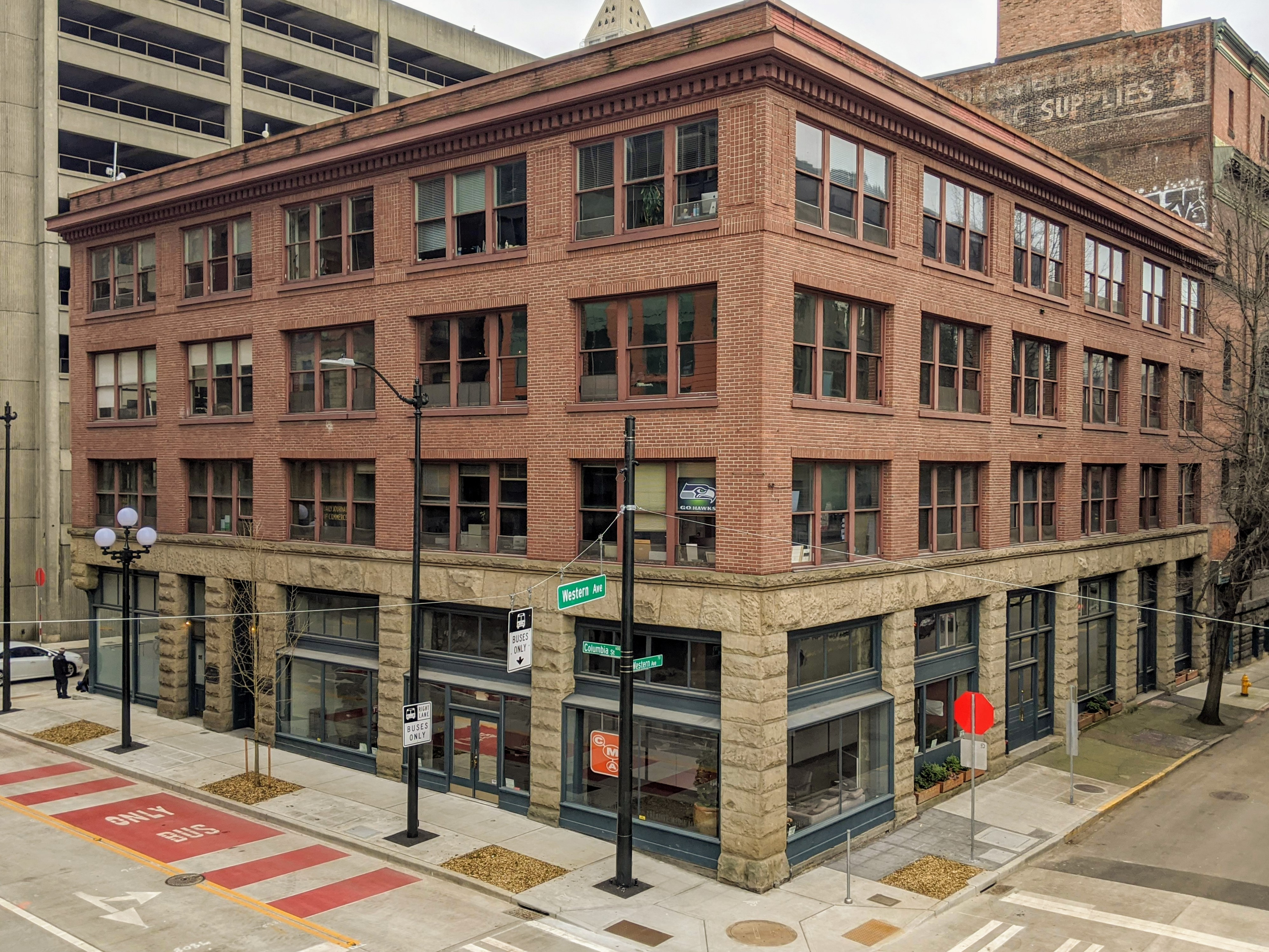
The Journal Building, associated with journalism at least since 1899 and home of the Bulletin / Journal at least since 1918. (Photographed 2020)

The Seattle Daily Journal of Commerce is a daily (six days per week) newspaper based in Seattle, Washington, specializing in business, construction, real estate, and legal news and public notices.

== History ==
Seattle Daily Journal of Commerce was founded in the year, 1893. The newspaper began publication in 1895 as the Bulletin, later the Daily Bulletin and the Seattle Daily Bulletin. After merging with the Times in 1907 (an unrelated paper to today's Seattle Times), it published as the Morning Times and Seattle Daily Bulletin for a year before reverting to its old name. It took the name Daily Journal of Commerce for the first time in 1919 as the Daily Journal of Commerce and the Daily Bulletin, dropping the Daily Bulletin portion two years later. "Seattle" was added to the paper's name in 1924. From 1951 to 1956 the paper was published under the name Seattle Daily Journal of Commerce and Construction Record, and then as the Seattle Daily Journal of Commerce and Northwest Construction Record until 1989, when it once again became simply the Seattle Daily Journal of Commerce.

In 2007, the Seattle Weekly ran a profile about the newspaper and how it was adapting to the internet age.

The paper was printed on a four-unit offset printing press from 1979 until July 2023 when printing transferred over to The Seattle Times' Rotary Offset Press facility in Kent. At that time the daily circulation was 1,500 copies.
