= Seattle Sun (2002–2005) =

American newspaper

The Seattle Sun was a free, monthly neighborhood newspaper in Seattle, Washington. Founded in 1997 by Clayton and Susan Brehme Park as the Jet City Maven, its first issue came out in March of that year. The next issue came out in May, and beginning in July, the paper went monthly. It originally covered only that part of Seattle north of N.E. 65th Street and east of Aurora Avenue N., but in September 1998 it was expanded to include all of the city north of the Lake Washington Ship Canal.

In January 2002 the Jet City Maven was renamed The Seattle Sun. The paper circulated 25,000 copies monthly with 5,000 copies direct mailed and featured neighborhood news, opinion, business, education, entertainment, home and garden, and health.

In August 2004, Wallis Bolz of Town Crier Publishing began operating the newspaper under a letter of intent to purchase it from Susan and Clayton Park. In January 2005, the Seattle Sun was officially sold to Town Crier.

With the May 18–31, 2005, issue, the Sun merged with the Seattle Star to form the Seattle Sun and Star.

In July 2005, citing a lack of advertising dollars, owner Wallis Bolz closed the newspaper. Bolz explained in an e-mail to the Beacon Hill News & South District Journal published July 27, 2005: "Faced with a choice of gutting the newspaper or closing the doors, we closed the doors."
