= Knok Studio =

Film studio and nonprofit in Washington, US

- Founded: 2011
- Founder: Beau Chevassus
- Type: 501(c)(3) non-profit corporation under the laws of the State of Washington, US.
- Tax ID no.: 45-4021000
- Headquarters: Enumclaw, Washington
- Location: Seattle, Washington, United States
- Key people: Beau Chevassus (President); Jerry Chevassus (Chairperson)
- Website: www.knok.org

Knok Studio (Knok) is a film studio and charitable organization located in Seattle and Enumclaw, Washington state producing media for non-profit 501(c)3 organizations in the Pacific Northwest as well as internationally.

== History ==
In 2011 Beau Chevassus returned from serving as the videographer aboard Mercy Ships in Sierra Leone. At this time, Mercy Ships had a media team; however, Chevassus noted the equipment, craft, and long-term commitment of conventional for-profit media studios or independent filmmakers were unaffordable for conventional non-profits. This situation arose because Mercy Ships had hired Chevassus as their videographer, but they required him to raise his own support because the non-profit group could not afford a staff videographer. Knok Studio was established in 2011 to meet the needs of accessibility and cinematic storytelling for non-profit organizations.

== Awards ==
Knok is the production company involved in winning the 168 Film Project Evangelista Award (2013) out of 7 nominations and 84 total film entries. Knok Studio's founder, Chevassus, has won multiple awards, including the Jury Award for Short Experimental Film, As Vapour (2012), in the Show Me Justice Film Festival, and is responsible for viral video content published on YouTube.

== See also ==
- Non-profit journalism
- Non-profit technology
