= Deborah Kelley =

Marine geologist (born 1958)

- Born: 1958 (age 67–68); Bellevue, Washington, USA
- Education: University of Washington, Dalhousie University
- Scientific career
- Thesis: Fluid Circulation in a Submarine Paleohydrothermal System, Troodos Ophiolite, Cyprus: Fluid Inclusion Evidence for Deep-Seated Circulation of Brines in the Oceanic Crust (1990)
- Doctoral advisor: Paul Robinson

Deborah Sue Kelley (born 1958) is a marine geologist who studies hydrothermal vents, active submarine volcanoes, and life in these regions of the deep ocean.

== Early life and education ==
Kelley was born in 1958 and grew up in Bellevue, Washington. Her father died right when she finished high school, which required her to work full-time to put herself through college. Her sister, brother, and Kelley were all first-generation college students.

Kelley earned her Bachelors degree in 1983 and Masters of Science degree in 1987 in geology from the University of Washington. She completed her Ph.D. in Geological Sciences from Dalhousie University in 1990. Her dissertation is titled Fluid Circulation in a Submarine Paleohydrothermal System, Troodos Ophiolite, Cyprus: Fluid Inclusion Evidence for Deep-Seated Circulation of Brines in the Oceanic Crust and was completed under the supervision of Paul Robinson. Kelley did postdoctoral research at the Woods Hole Oceanographic Institution starting in 1990 before moving back to Seattle in 1992, where she finished her postdoctoral research at the University of Washington through 1995.

== Research career ==
Kelley joined the faculty at the University of Washington in 1995 and is currently a professor in the UW School of Oceanography. Kelley has been a co-chief and chief scientist on numerous oceanographic excursions, participating in over forty blue water research expeditions. She has been on more than fifty dives in the submersible Alvin.

In 2000, Kelley was part of the discovery of the Lost City Hydrothermal Field on the Mid-Atlantic Ridge, an area of limestone chimneys that were further away from ocean ridges than expected. In 2005, Kelley was co-chief scientist for the shore-based participants of another Lost City Hydrothermal Field research cruise, while the NOAA ship Ronald H. Brown was on site in the Atlantic Ocean at the Mid-Atlantic Ridge. For the first time in ocean exploration, this expedition allowed the participation of an entire science party located not at sea but instead in a Science Command Center on land.

Kelley has served on several national and international professional committees, including the Committee on an Ocean Infrastructure Strategy for U.S. Ocean Research in 2030, resulting in a consensus report published by the National Academies Press in 2011.

Kelley is co-author of the book Discovering the Deep, A Photographic Atlas of the Seafloor and Oceanic Crust, published by Cambridge University Press in 2015, exploring the geologic features of the seafloor and the life that exists at depth through more than 500 high-resolution photos.

Currently, Kelley is the director for the underwater cabled component of the National Science Foundation's Ocean Observatories Initiative (OOI) Regional Cabled Array.

== Awards and honors ==
- 2016 - Named a Fellow of the American Geophysical Union for major contributions to the discovery and innovative investigation of seafloor hydrothermal phenomena and their chemo-synthetic ecosystems.
- 2016 - PROSE Award for Publishing, Earth Science - Discovering the Deep, A Photographic Atlas of the Seafloor and Oceanic Crust, presented by the Association of American Publishers’ Professional and Scholarly Publishing Division.
- 1997-1998 - Named one of six JOI/USSAC Distinguished Lecturers, visited five higher education institutions to present a talk titled, Volatile-fluid evolution in submarine magma-hydrothermal systems.
