= Seattle Star (2002–2005) =

Neighborhood newspaper (2002–2005)

The Seattle Star was a free, neighborhood newspaper in Seattle, Washington, United States, covering the south and central sections of the city. Founded in 2002 as the South Seattle Star, it changed its name to the Seattle Star in 2004. It was published biweekly.

With the May 18–31, 2005, issue, the Star merged with the Seattle Sun to form the Seattle Sun and Star. It printed its last issue on July 1, 2005.
