= Assunta Ng =

- Occupations: Journalist; publisher
- Known for: Founder and publisher of the Sing Tao Daily (San Francisco)

Assunta Ng is Chinese-American community organizer and the publisher of Northwest Asian Weekly and Seattle Chinese Post, based in Seattle's Chinatown/International District.

== Biography ==
Ng was born in China and raised in Hong Kong. Ng got her first name, which means ascension, from an Italian priest when she was baptized.

In 1971 at age 19, she immigrated to the United States from Hong Kong to attend the University of Washington (UW). Ng wanted to relocate to the U.S. because her parents had low expectations for daughters and Ng did not want to become a housewife, which was what was modeled to her as she was growing up. At that time, she had the perception that only in America could a woman be free. After the first year, Ng supported herself for the rest of her college education. Her first job was as a dishwasher in a school cafeteria, and it paid $2.50 an hour. Ng also baby-sat and worked in restaurants to keep afloat. She wrote for the Daily newspaper while at the UW, and she earned a bachelor's degree in international studies and education from the UW in 1974, a teaching certificate in 1976, and a master's degree in communications in 1979.

Post-college, Ng taught social studies to children of immigrant families at Mercer Junior High School. She observed that many were lost in a strange new system. It was during this time that she became aware of the lack of information available to the local Chinese community. In 1982, Ng started with $25,000 of her own seed money and founded the Seattle Chinese Post. A year later in 1983, Ng founded the Northwest Asian Weekly, a Pan-Asian English-language weekly.

External videos
- “Remarkable People: Making a Difference in the Northwest; Assunta Ng,” produced by Jean Walkinshaw in 1993.

In 1986, Ng was one of 15 women who joined the Seattle chapter of Rotary International, before the parent organization allowed women to join.

In 1996, Ng founded Women of Color Empowered, a tri-annual networking luncheon series that honors women of color who have made an impact in their local communities. Through her nonprofit, the Northwest Asian Weekly Foundation, Ng has organized programs and scholarships to help disadvantaged youth and women, and she has raised more than $3 million for various charities and scholarships for foster children, University of Washington, Washington State University, Seattle University, and Seattle Community Colleges.

In January 2023, Ng closed the Seattle Chinese Post after her husband was diagnosed with cancer a year earlier and she decided to retire. The Northwest Asian Weekly ceased its weekly print edition and became online-only. In September 2023, The Post was donated to the Tacoma-based Asia Pacific Cultural Center. In May 2024, the Asian Weekly was sold to four investors.

== See also ==
- Northwest Asian Weekly
- Seattle Chinese Post
