= Seattle Sun and Star =

The Seattle Sun and Star was a free, bi-weekly neighborhood newspaper in Seattle, Washington, United States formed in 2005 by the merger of the Seattle Star and Seattle Sun newspapers. The new publication put out only two issues: May 18–31, 2005 and July 1, 2005.
