= KKXA =

- Snohomish, Washington; United States
- Broadcast area: Seattle metropolitan area
- Frequency: 1520 kHz
- Branding: Classic Country KXA

Programming
- Language: English
- Format: Classic country
- Affiliations: Compass Media Networks

Ownership
- Owner: CAAM Partnership, LLC
- Sister stations: KRKO

History
- First air date: October 11, 2011

Technical information
- Licensing authority: FCC
- Facility ID: 160891
- Class: B
- Power: 50,000 watts
- Transmitter coordinates: 47°52′31.4″N 122°04′44.5″W
- Translator: 96.9 K245DL (Everett)

Links
- Public license information: Public file; LMS
- Webcast: Listen live
- Website: everettpost.com/kxa

KKXA (1520 AM, "Classic Country KXA") is a commercial radio station licensed to Snohomish, Washington, United States, and serving the Seattle metropolitan area. The station's license is held by CAAM Partnership, LLC., an entity controlled by the Skotdal family, which also publishes the Everett Post newspaper. The KKXA studios are shared with sister station KRKO at the Key Tower building in downtown Everett, Washington. The transmitter is off Short School Road (115th Avenue SE) in Snohomish. KKXA airs a classic country format.

KKXA is licensed to broadcast in HD Radio. KKXA also broadcasts on a low-power FM translator, K245DL (96.9 FM).

== History ==
=== Building the station ===
In January 2004, the Skotdal family applied to the Federal Communications Commission (FCC) for a construction permit for a new broadcast radio station. The FCC granted this permit on March 16, 2011, with a scheduled expiration date of March 16, 2014. The Skotdal family won a comparative hearing before the Federal Communications Commission against mutually exclusive applicants hoping to place the signal in Hawaii, Whidbey Island, and on the Olympic Peninsula. The station was assigned the call sign "KKXA" by the Federal Communications Commission (FCC) on March 28, 2011.

Known on-air as "KXA" as a tribute to pioneering radio station KXA (770 AM), the station began airing a loop of test audio in August 2011. KKXA broadcasts to the greater Seattle metropolitan area. On October 11, 2011, KKXA began regular broadcasting at 4:00 pm with a classic country format branded as "Classic Country 1520 KXA". The first song was "Simple Man" by Charlie Daniels. The station received its broadcast license on November 4, 2011.

Stitch Mitchell has been doing the morning show since the Classic Country format began in 2011. Stitch was previously with KBSG/Seattle, B-87/Portland, and KMZQ/Las Vegas.

=== Digital (HD) Broadcasting ===
On October 4 and 5, 2014, KKXA was the only radio station in North America broadcasting a 100% digital signal during historic tests for NAB Labs, a division of the National Association of Broadcasters. KKXA suspended analog transmissions for four hours on Saturday and eight hours on Sunday for nighttime and daytime tests, respectively. KKXA was the third commercial AM station in North America to test all-digital daytime transmissions. KKXA currently broadcasts using HD Radio technology alongside its analog signal.

== Programming ==
KKXA broadcasts classic country music. In addition to its music programming, KKXA is an affiliate of the Washington State University Cougar football and basketball network, and also carries Western Conference high school football and basketball. Occasional Everett AquaSox baseball (Seattle Mariners affiliate) and Everett Silvertips hockey games are also aired on KKXA.

== Translator ==
Broadcast translator for KKXA
Call sign	Frequency	City of license	FID	ERP (W)	HAAT	Class	Transmitter coordinates	FCC info
K245DL	96.9 FM	Everett, Washington	156877	250	152.4 m (500 ft)	D	47°55′46.3″N 122°14′56.5″W	LMS
