= ResearchChannel =

Educational cable television network

- Country: United States
- Headquarters: Seattle

History
- Launched: November 1996; 29 years ago
- Closed: 31 August 2010; 15 years ago

Availability

Terrestrial
- KAMU-TV, KUJH-LP, KWSU-TV, KYES-TV, WPSU-TV

ResearchChannel was an American educational cable television network operated by a consortium of universities, foundations, government agencies, corporations, and learned societies. It began broadcasting in 1996, and discontinued operations in 2010.

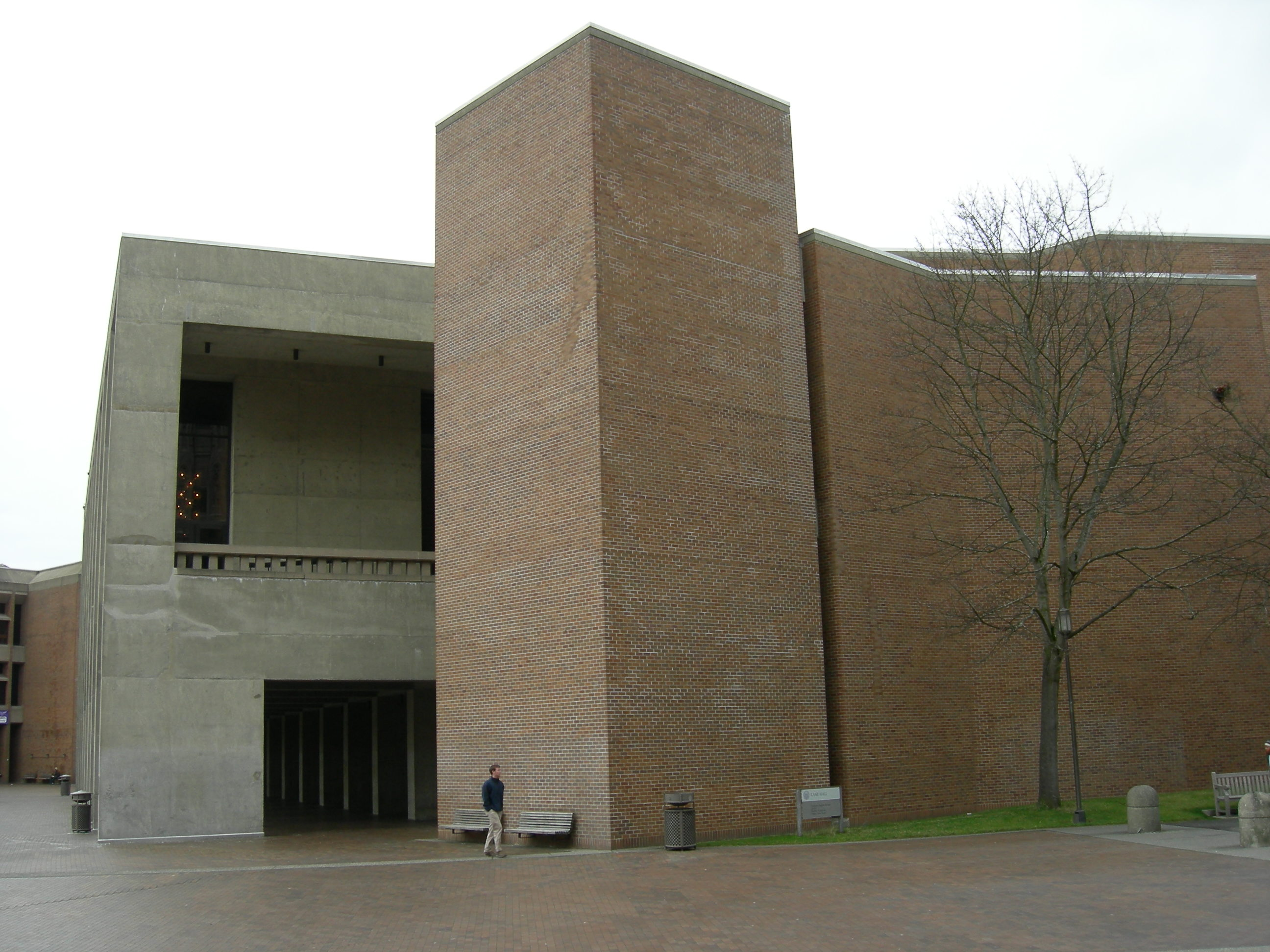
ResearchChannel studios were located at Kane Hall in Seattle

== History ==
ResearchChannel was established in 1996 under the name Research TV by a group of American universities. Its studios were physically located at the University of Washington's Kane Hall throughout its existence. Participating institutions produced and provided original programming highlighting their research and innovations to air on the station and also provided funding.

During its early existence, a period which predated YouTube, ResearchChannel partnered with Google to make its programs available for free download. It also collaborated with companies such as Microsoft to help advance what were then new video technologies, such as high definition web streaming.

In March 2010 the University of Washington – which had heavily subsidized the network by providing its physical space, satellite uplink, website maintenance, and studio staff – announced it would end its support of ResearchChannel. The network went off-air at the end of August 2010.

== Availability ==
ResearchChannel was carried on channel 9400 of the Dish Network as well as cable television channels in select American markets. It also aired over-the-air on several terrestrial television stations: KAMU-TV (College Station, Texas), KWSU-TV (Pullman, Washington), KYES-TV (Anchorage, Alaska), KUJH-LP (Lawrence, Kansas), and WPSU-TV (State College, Pennsylvania).

== Governance ==
The board of directors of ResearchChannel, as of 2007, consisted of Rita R. Colwell, David L. Evans, Ron Johnson, Ann Moore, James J. O'Donnell, Steve Smith, Ann Stunden, and Marshall Turner.

Member institutions of ResearchChannel included the American Meteorological Society, the National Institutes of Health, Rutgers University, the National University of Singapore, Stanford University, Tulane University, the University of Chicago, Yale University, the University of Pennsylvania, Internet2, the California Institute for Telecommunications and Information Technology, the National Science Foundation, Microsoft, IBM, and the Howard Hughes Medical Institute, among others.
