= Westside Seattle =

Weekly newspaper in Washington state, United States

- Type: Weekly newspaper
- Owner: Robinson Communications Inc.
- Publisher: T. C. Robinson and Kenneth Robinson
- Managing editor: Kenneth Robinson
- General manager: T. C. Robinson
- Founded: 1891 (as The Ballard News)
- Language: English
- City: Seattle, Washington
- OCLC number: 983209058
- Website: westsideseattle.com

Westside Seattle, formerly The Westside Weekly, is a weekly newspaper that serves the areas of West Seattle, Ballard, White Center, Burien, Des Moines, and SeaTac in Washington state.

== History ==
In 1952, Gerald “Jerry” Robinson, owner of Robinson Newspapers, purchased the White Center News (1923). He founded the Federal Way News in 1954 and launched the Des Monies News in 1963. He bought the West Seattle Herald (1923) in 1974 and acquired the Highline Times of Burien a few years later.

In 1989, Robinson's five-newspaper operation was sold to American Community Newspapers and he retired. In 1991, The Seattle Times Company acquired three of those newspapers (Federal Way News, Highline Times and Des Moines News) in bankruptcy court. Robinson also bought back the West Seattle Herald and White Center News. The Seattle Times later shuttered those three papers in 1997. This prompted Robinson to relaunch the newspapers and Sound Publishing to launch the Federal Way Mirror.

In 1993, Robinson acquired the Ballard News-Tribune of Ballard (founded in 1963 after The Ballard News and The Ballard Tribune merged) and the Monroe Monitor and Valley News (1899). The Monitor was later sold to RIM Publications.

On August 21, 2013, Robinson Newspapers announced that it would combine the Ballard News-Tribune, the Highline Times, the West Seattle Herald, and White Center News into The Westside Weekly on September 6, 2013. In 2014, Amanda Knox began writing for the paper. Jerry Robinson died in 2014, and ownership of the paper was passed down to his three sons. The paper's name was changed from The Westside Weekly to Westside Seattle in June 2017. The newspaper published its final print issue on April 30, 2021, but continued to maintain an online presence.
