= Northwest Asian Weekly =

Weekly newspaper in Seattle, Washington, United States

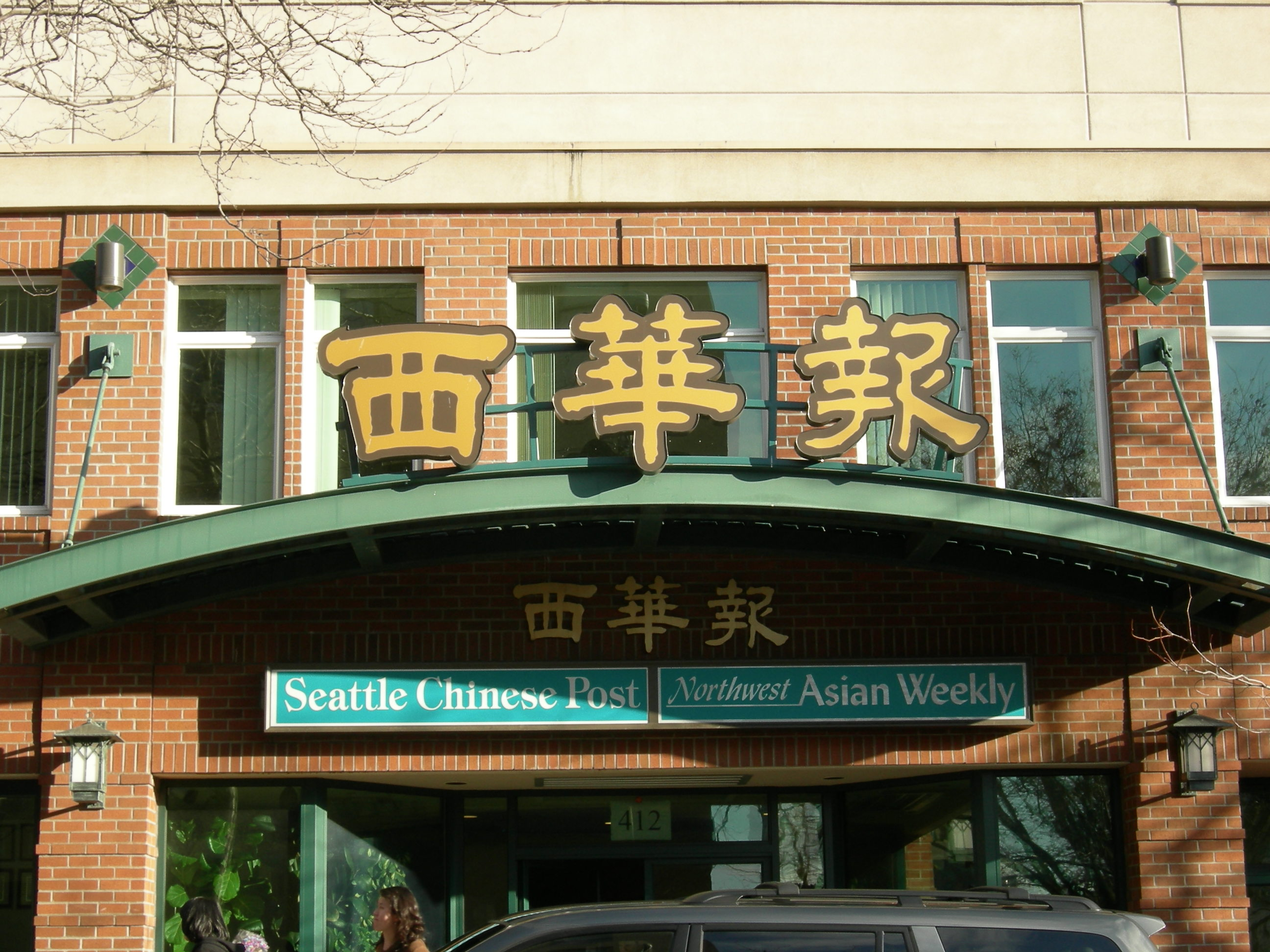
- Headquarters of the Seattle Chinese Post and Northwest Asian Weekly (2007)
- Type: Weekly newspaper (until 2023); Online-only (since 2023)
- Publisher: Assunta Ng
- Editor: Stacy Nguyen
- Founded: February 5, 1983
- Language: English
- Headquarters: 412 Maynard Avenue S Seattle, Washington, U.S.
- Sister newspapers: Seattle Chinese Post
- Website: nwasianweekly.com

The Northwest Asian Weekly is an Asian American newspaper based in Seattle's International District. It was founded in 1983 by Assunta Ng, publisher of the Seattle Chinese Post, and published free weekly editions until January 2023.

== History ==
Northwest Asian Weekly published its first edition on February 5, 1983, as the successor to an English insert in the Seattle Chinese Post that debuted in September 1982.

Both newspapers were published by Assunta Ng; among the early supporters of the Asian Weekly was Gary Locke, who later became the first Asian American governor of Washington. It was distributed for free and had a circulation of 9,500 prior to the onset of the COVID-19 pandemic in 2020.

The Asian Weekly ceased print publication on January 21, 2023, and became an online-only news outlet; the Seattle Chinese Post also ceased on the same day.

In May 2024, Ng sold Asian Weekly to a group of four investors.

== Distribution ==
Northwest Asian Weekly's print version were widely distributed in Seattle, primarily at Asian American businesses, grocery stores, and restaurants. They were also available at businesses in other parts of King and Snohomish counties, as well as public libraries statewide.
