= Denny International Middle School =

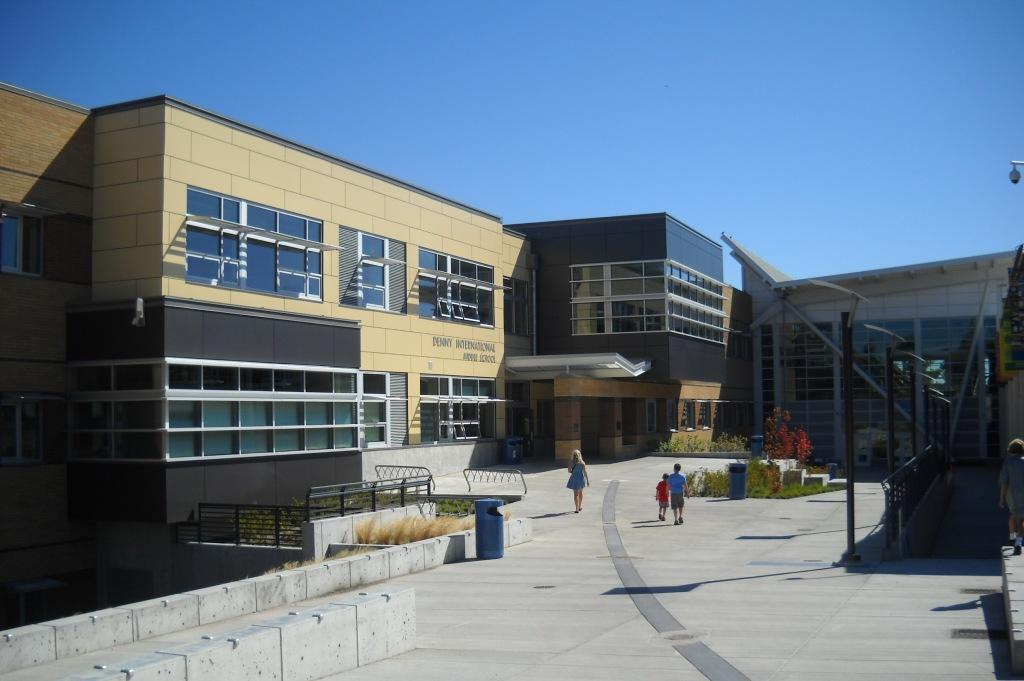

Location
- 2601 SW Kenyon Street; Seattle, WA 98126; 47°31′48″N 122°21′58″W

Information
- Type: Middle School
- Motto: "Academic Excellence, for every student, in our Global Village"
- Established: 1952, 2011 (new facility)
- Principal: Jeff Clark
- Faculty: Approx. 60
- Enrollment: Approx. 700
- Language: English/Spanish
- Colors: Blue & White
- Mascot: Dolphin
- Feeder to: Chief Sealth International High School
- Website: dennyms.seattleschools.org

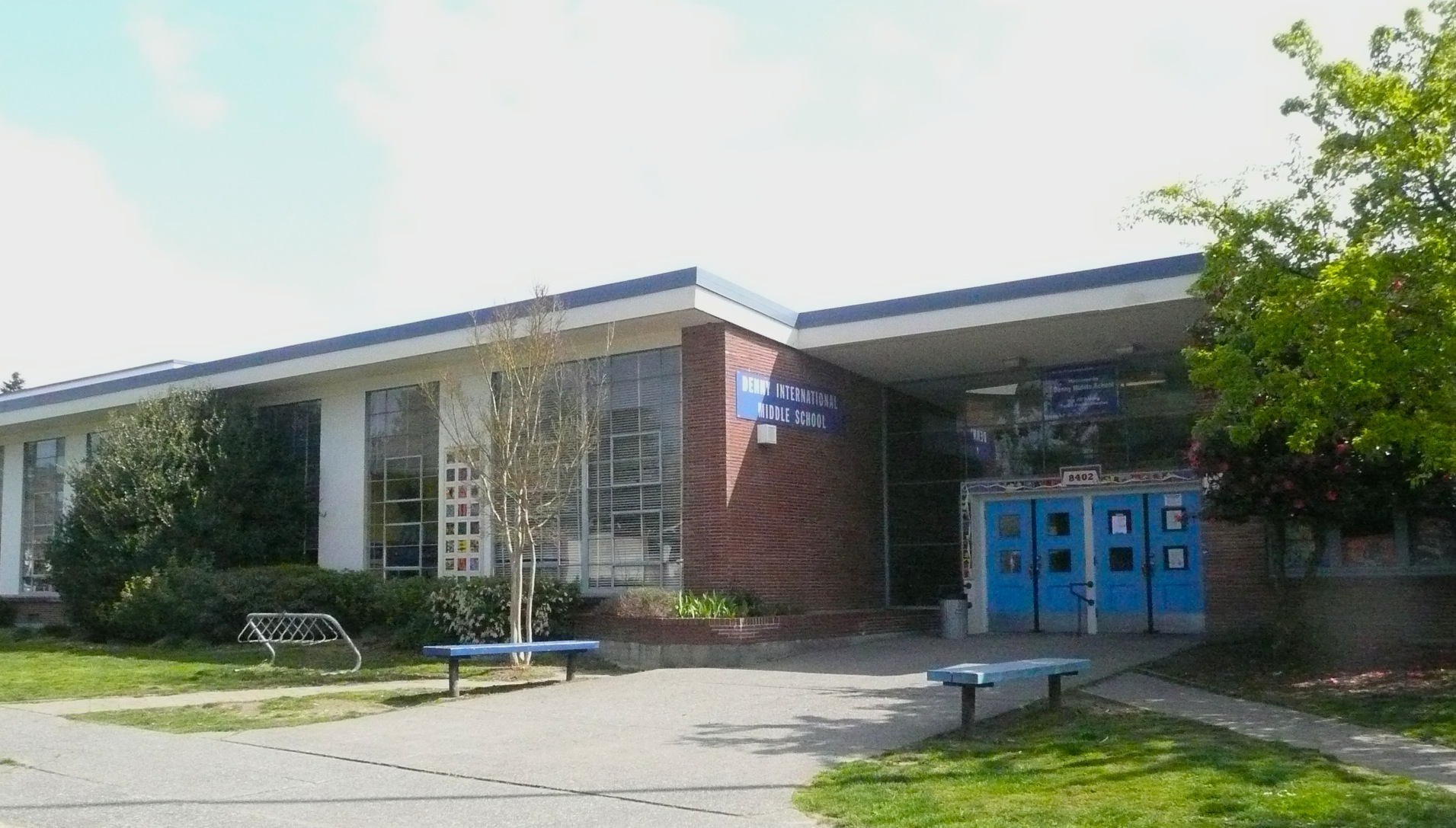
Factory model school building at the school's original location on 30th Ave SW

Denny International Middle School (DIMS) is a middle school in West Seattle, the southwest portion of Seattle, Washington. Operated by Seattle Public Schools. It is named for David T. Denny, one of Seattle’s early settlers and an early member of the Seattle School Board. The school shares a campus with Chief Sealth International High School (CSIHS) which provides a joint facility for students in grades 6-12. The school's student population is racially and culturally diverse and the programs offered reflect this.

== History & Facilities ==
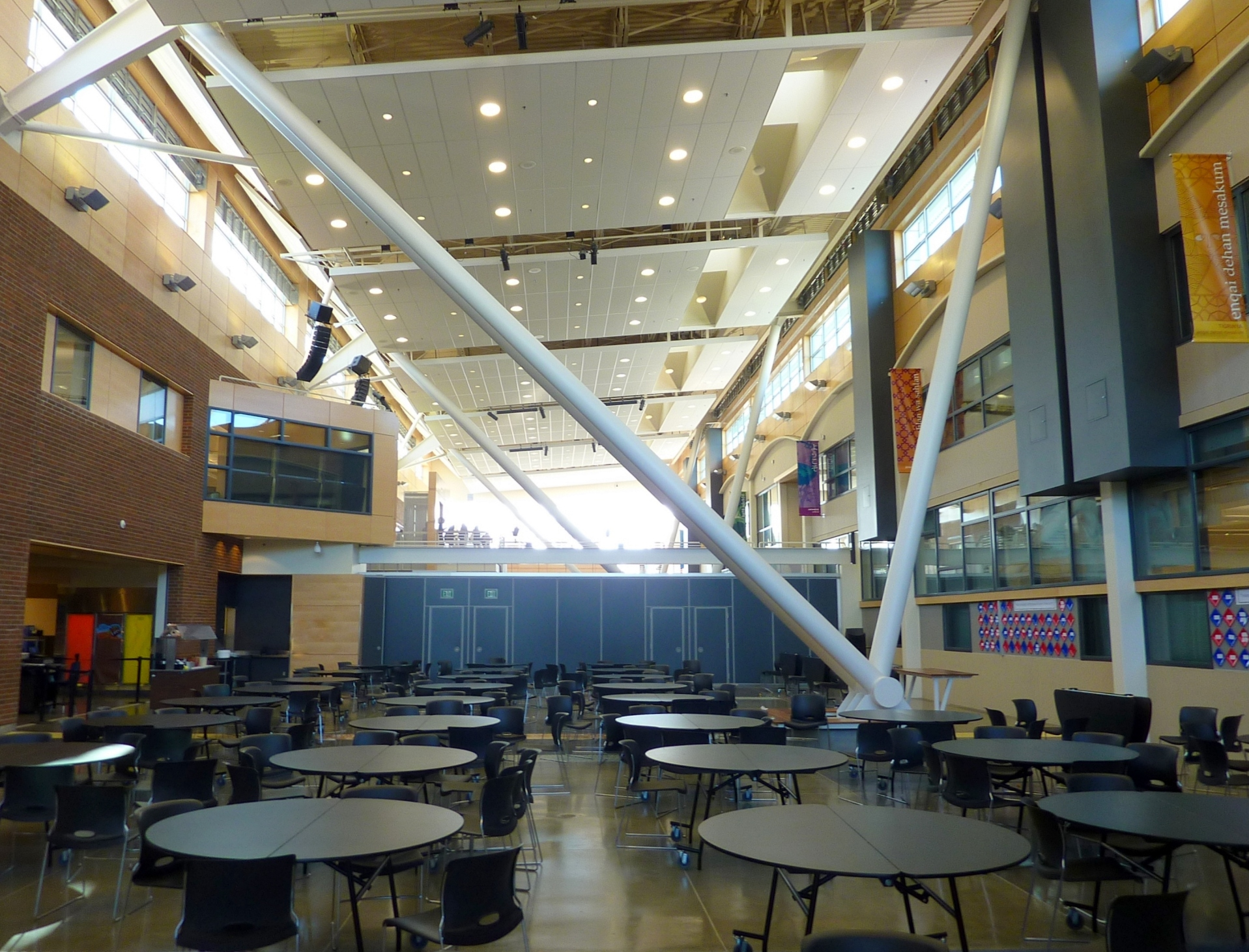
The Galleria at Denny IMS (2011). The former exterior wall of Chief Sealth IHS is on the right.

The school opened in 1952 as David T. Denny Junior High School at 8401 30th Avenue SW. The facility was designed for 900 students but in 1959-1963 enrollment was over 1,600. In 1982–83, Denny went to 7–8 configuration, in 1989–90 to a 6-8 configuration, and in 2010 it was renamed Denny International Middle School to reflect its focus on international focus studies and foreign languages.

In September 2011 the school was relocated from its original location to the nearby campus of Chief Sealth International High School. Both schools remain distinct within the shared facility, although some spaces such as the renovated CSIHS auditorium and the new Galleria are shared between the schools. The design of the renovation and expansion was undertaken by Bassetti Architects of Seattle. The school remains in close proximity to the Nino Cantu Southwest Athletic Complex, which features a 4000-seat outdoor stadium, and a community center and pool operated by the City of Seattle. The former site was converted to a school district-owned community park that includes tennis courts and a softball field.

During the 1992-93 school year, principal Joan Allen died and a garden was dedicated to her memory.

== Academics ==
The curricula of Denny and Chief Sealth are planned jointly to align programs, including mathematics and reading, to provide a clear pathway to CSIHS's International Baccalaureate (IB) Program. The school offers a global perspective and dual language immersion.

The World Language program offers classes for all grades in Spanish, Chinese, and Arabic as well as a dual-language immersion program. DIMS is a partner of the Confucius Institute of Washington, part of a worldwide program on Chinese language and culture; the institute's Education Center is now located within the new DIMS/CSIHS facility.

Proyecto Saber (Spanish for "Project Knowledge"), a Latino-focused academic support class that works closely with students' families and community partners to provide academic skill enhancement with guest speakers and parent contributions.

Project Lead The Way is a pre-engineering (STEM) program for both DIMS and CSIHS students. It offers project-based learning in subjects including automation and robotics, green architecture, and flight and space.

== Music and Band ==
Denny IMS has a music department that offers band, orchestra, jazz band and choral music. It is the only middle school in the school district that offers marching band, steel drums and mariachi. Denny and Chief Sealth have aligned their music programs to provide a continuous grade 6-12 pathway. The programs incorporate a global perspective in the selection of music and instruments as well as partnerships with the Seattle Repertory Theatre and Paramount Theatre.

== See also ==
- Seattle Public Schools
- West Seattle
