= Thelma Dewitty =

American teacher (1912–1977)

Thelma Dewitty (1912–1977) was the first African American to teach in the Seattle Public Schools, Seattle, Washington, U.S.. She was also active in the NAACP, serving as Seattle branch president in the late 1950s.

== Career ==
Dewitty was born in Beaumont, Texas. She began her career as a schoolteacher in Corpus Christi, Texas in 1933. She received her bachelor's degree in from Wiley College in Marshall, Texas, in 1941 and transferred to teach in her native Beaumont in 1942.

In the summer of 1947, she was attending graduate school at the University of Washington and writing a mathematics book for children. Her husband was working in Seattle at the time, and she was hoping to be able to stay on as a teacher. The Seattle Urban League, NAACP, the Civic Unity Committee, and Christian Friends for Racial Equality all encouraged the school system to break the color barrier by hiring her. Nonetheless, some of Seattle's long-established African American families were unhappy to see this groundbreaking role go to an outsider.

Her first teaching job in Seattle was at the Frank B. Cooper School. Principal Lester Roblee told the teachers that anyone uncomfortable with teaching on a faculty with a black teacher could transfer to another school. No one took up the offer. One mother objected to having her child in Dewitty's class and asked that the child be removed; Roblee rejected the request.

Dewitty's hiring broke ground not only because of her race, but because she was a married woman. During World War II, the Seattle School Board had relaxed a prior rule against married women teachers. The rule was finally eliminated in 1947, the year Dewitty was hired. Shortly after Dewitty was hired, a second African American woman, Marita Johnson, was hired to teach Household Service at Broadway-Edison Technical School, (the precursor to Seattle Central Community College).

From 1947 until her retirement in 1973, Dewitty taught at a number of Seattle schools. After the Cooper School, she taught at the John Hay (1953–55), Laurelhurst (1955–56), and Sandpoint (1956–58) elementaries and finally at Meany Junior High School (1958–1973). At Laurelhurst, she was responsible for successfully challenging several rigid school traditions, including assigned seats in the teachers' room, and a very strict system for distributing school supplies.

Besides serving as a teacher and working with the NAACP, Dewitty served on the Washington State Board Against Discrimination (WSBAD) and on the Board of Theater Supervisors for Seattle and King County.

== Dewitty and the Cooper School ==
Dewitty is most strongly associated with the Frank B. Cooper School. When the old Cooper school was given city landmark status, the fact that it was where Dewitty first taught in Seattle was one of the major reasons cited to give it that status. Similarly, the discussion of the school on the National Park Service page about the school as a site on the National Register of Historic Places is largely about Dewitty.

The old school building is now the Youngstown Cultural Arts Center and houses the Thelma Dewitty Theater.
