= Frank B. Cooper =

American education administrator

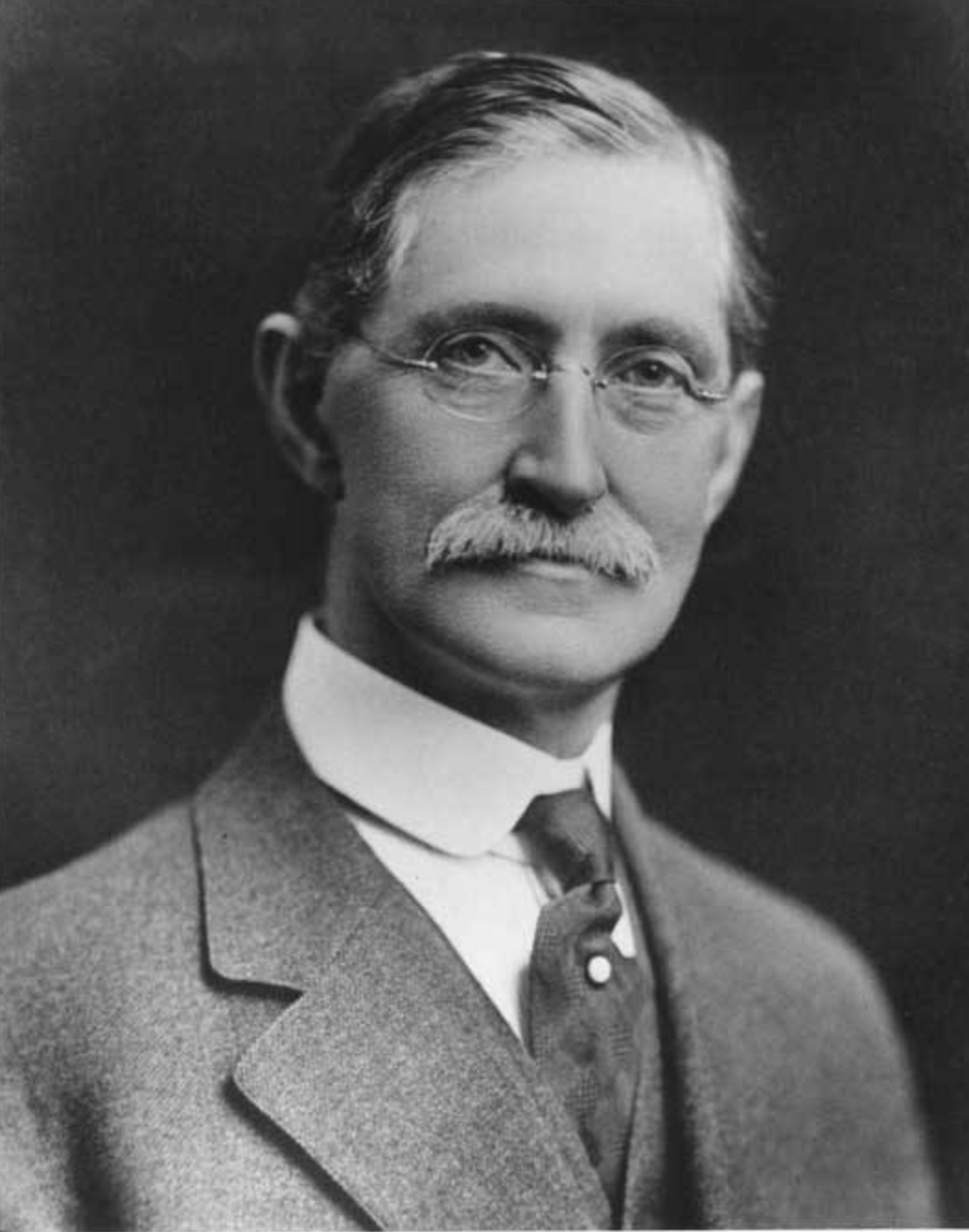
- Frank B. Cooper, c. 1910

Superintendent of Seattle Public Schools
- In office 1901 – August 1, 1922
- Preceded by: Frank J. Barnard
- Succeeded by: Thomas R. Cole

Superintendent of Schools, Salt Lake City
- In office 1899–1901

Superintendent of Schools, Des Moines, Iowa
- In office 1891–1899

Superintendent of Schools, Le Mars, Iowa
- In office 1883–1890

Personal details
- Born: September 17, 1855 Mount Morris Township, Illinois
- Died: November 23, 1930 (aged 75) Seattle, Washington
- Education: Cornell University
- Occupation: school administrator

Jere Frank Bower Cooper (September 17, 1855 – November 23, 1930) was an American education administrator. He served as the superintendent of Seattle Public Schools from 1901 until 1922, where he was known as a progressive administrator who introduced updated instruction methods and raised teacher pay in order to recruit teachers from across the nation. His program of building schools that were tightly integrated into their neighborhoods helped shape Seattle into a city known for its distinctive, cohesive neighborhoods. He also served as superintendent in Des Moines, Iowa, and Salt Lake City. A devotee of the educational reformer John Dewey, Cooper's progressive approach sometimes brought him into conflict with more conservative community members, particularly after World War I.

== Early life and family ==
Cooper was born in Mount Morris Township, Illinois on September 17, 1855, to blacksmith William Thomas Cooper and Barbara Theophania Wallace. He attended high school in Polo, Illinois, and worked as a news butcher on trains and as a mule driver in order to earn money for further education, with the aim of becoming a lawyer. He accepted a teaching position at age seventeen, and a year later became the principal of a two-room school, a position which he held for a year.

Cooper studied at Cornell University for one year, from 1878 to 1879, and decided to shift his career aspirations from law to education.

He married Martha M. "Mattie" Hazeltine of St. Johnsbury, Vermont, in Polo on August 24, 1880. The couple had two daughters, Phania and Ruth, and two sons, John and William. William was aboard the SS Tuscania when it was sunk by a German U-boat in 1918, but he survived.

Martha died in Seattle on June 14, 1916, after a lengthy illness. Cooper remarried in 1920, to Margaret Curtis, formerly of Los Angeles.

== Career ==
Cooper worked as a superintendent of public schools in two cities in Iowa, in Salt Lake City, Utah, and in Seattle, Washington. In each of the three states, he also served as president of the state's teachers' association and on the state board of education. He was a devotee of the progressive principles of education reformer John Dewey.

He served as the president of the National Education Association's Department of Superintendence in 1908, having previously been the department's secretary in 1901 and its vice-president in 1898.

=== Iowa (1883–1899) ===
Cooper served as the superintendent of public schools in Le Mars, Iowa, from 1883 to 1890. From 1890 to 1891, he was a professor of pedagogy at the State University of Iowa (now known as the University of Iowa), after which he took the position of superintendent in Des Moines beginning in 1891.

Cooper served as president of the Iowa State Teachers' Association in 1893 and used his position to argue for more rigorous training of teachers in the state. He observed that "it is a well-known fact, not flattering to be sure, that a first grade certificate in Iowa is about equal in grade to the second-class certificate in Illinois, Wisconsin, Indiana, Minnesota, and other sister states."

In March 1899 he traveled to Salt Lake City for an interview with the school board for the superintendent position there.

=== Salt Lake City (1899–1901) ===
Salt Lake City superintendent of schools Jesse F. Millspaugh had resigned his position in Salt Lake City early in his two-year term in December 1898. The debate over who should replace him reinflamed past tension between Mormons and non-Mormons on the school board and in the community, with newspapers carrying on editorial debates over whether Mormon candidates would even be considered due a perceived bias on the non-Mormon-majority board. On April 11, 1899, the board offered the job to Cooper, a Congregationalist, by a vote of 6 to 4 along sectarian lines, with the minority asserting that Cooper's lack of a formal degree disqualified him and that the other candidate, Joshua H. Paul, lost only because of his Mormon faith. Cooper was able to soothe the tension and the following year, on June 13, 1900, he was unanimously re-appointed for a full term.

The city of Seattle asked him in 1900 to become its superintendent, but he declined in order to serve out his term in Salt Lake City.

A smallpox outbreak later that year prompted the health board to mandate that unvaccinated children be kept home from school, leading to another rift between the Mormon and non-Mormon blocs of the school board. Although only a small minority of church leaders were opposed to vaccination, one of them, Charles W. Penrose, used his position as editor of the Deseret News to promote the view that the authorities had no right to mandate vaccination. The school board voted to allow the unvaccinated children into school in defiance of the health board, lawsuits ensued, and Cooper was put in the position of needing to decide which orders his employees should obey. After the board denied his request to address them about his concerns, he objected he "never again" wanted to be on a board where he was not allowed to speak and was told he "might not have the opportunity". When Seattle's offer was repeated again in early 1901, he accepted.

=== Seattle (1901–1930) ===
Cooper took over as superintendent of Seattle Public Schools in 1901 following the resignation of Frank J. Barnard. For much of his time in Seattle, his progressive approach to education meshed well with the attitude of the school board and public, but following World War I, he clashed with an increasingly conservative board.

==== Expansion and innovation ====
In Seattle, Cooper oversaw an expansion in both the number of grammar schools and the scope of their curriculum. He envisioned them as centers for both the students and the community, and expanded class offerings beyond a core curriculum to include art and music, physical education, gardening, and manual training programs for students at risk of dropping out. He championed the use of teaching techniques that required students to research and discuss topics aloud rather than perform rote memorization.

Cooper took personal responsibility for hiring teachers, and hired them from all over the country. By 1910, a quarter of the city's teachers had a bachelor's degree, and a half had a two-year normal school degree. He instituted a school medical program which grew to include a medical and dental clinic and baby-care classes, and added special education classes for students with learning or physical disabilities. Enrollment in high schools in Seattle increased from 872 to 10,885 over the course of Cooper's tenure, and the system as a whole grew from 21 buildings for 10,017 pupils to 98 buildings for 42,241.

He instituted a program of teaching English to the foreign-born parents of children in the school and felt that "any really effective scheme of Americanization must include reaching the home of foreign people using a language other than English, in our community, and one influential means of reaching such homes is by way of the mothers and through the cooperation of the children attending American schools from those homes". He also fought against a plan floated by the school board to have a permanently segregated building for teaching of foreign students, arguing that they should instead be integrated into the regular classes as soon as their English skills warranted.

==== Conflict and resignation ====
Cooper's progressive approach to education led to some tension within the community, particularly as its more conservative elements gained influence throughout World War I. A state law passed in 1915 required the performance of flag exercises at all public gatherings, including public schools. Cooper disliked the formalized flag exercises the law called for, saying that to implement it literally would be "perfunctory and tasteless." He argued that teachers be allowed to present more symbolic exercises that taught the meaning of the principles the flag stood for, which caused conflict with organizations including the Daughters of the American Revolution that were trying to ensure that a more rigorous program of patriotism be taught in schools.

In early 1918, Cooper attempted to defend the teaching of German in schools, saying, "aversion to and detestation of things German may carry us to unreasonable and reactionary limits", but relented in the face of public pressure and removed it from the curriculum that April. The following year, the board rescinded its approval of a series of history textbooks that had been deemed too pro-German, and also fired a high school teacher, Charles Neiderhauser, for an alleged lack of patriotism.

Beginning in 1916, Cooper had pushed for more administrative power for his office, but the school board instead reorganized the system in 1919 to make him just one of six department heads. A group called the Tax Reduction Council (or TRC) began attacking Cooper both professionally and personally, arguing that he had spent too much money building schools and offering unnecessary classes and extracurricular activities, and calling for him to be replaced by a younger superintendent. The board decided to hire no new teachers for the 1921–1922 year and laid off some current ones for the first time, and Cooper refused to participate in recommending further budget cuts.

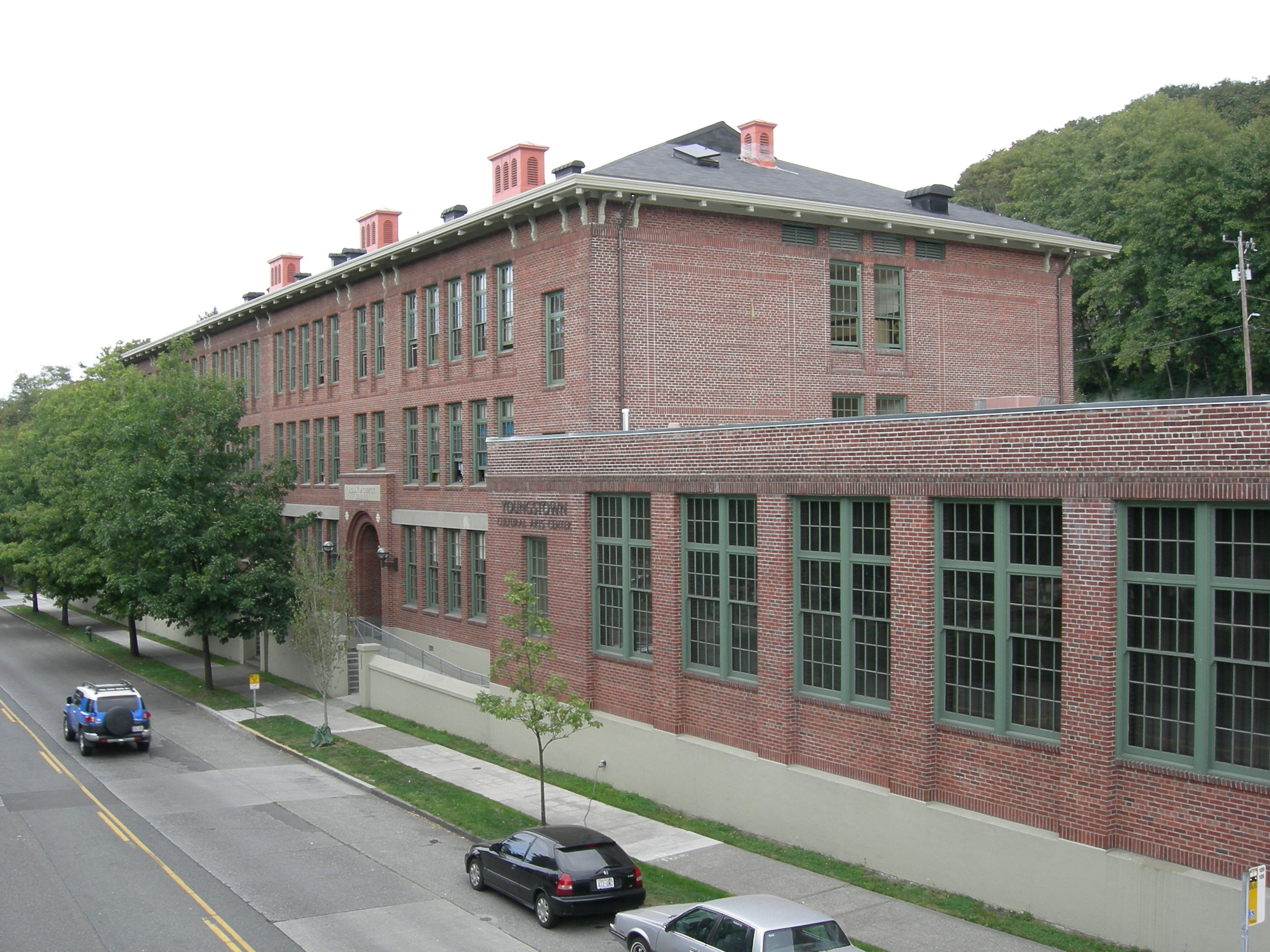
The original Frank B. Cooper Elementary School, built in 1917.

Cooper submitted his resignation on March 17, 1922, effective August 1, though after the board passed further budget cuts, he took an early leave in June, and assistant superintendent Thomas R. Cole succeeded him.

==== Later life ====
Cooper was appointed to the Washington State Board of Education to succeed W. F. Geiger, taking office on June 17, 1921, and serving until he was succeeded by George B. Miller on May 1, 1923.

After retiring, Cooper bought a ten-acre estate in Lake Forest Park. He died there on November 23, 1930, after a brief illness.

== Legacy and memorials ==
The Frank B. Cooper Scholarship Fund, for "needy and worthy students," was raised by representatives of Seattle public schools after his retirement in 1922.

Frank B. Cooper Elementary School in the Delridge district of Seattle was renamed from the Youngstown School in honor of Cooper in 1939. The school itself moved to a new building in 1999; the original building, built during Cooper's tenure and now the home of the Youngstown Cultural Arts Center, is on the National Register of Historic Places.
