= Aki Kurose =

Teacher and education/affordable housing activist

- Born: Akiko Kato; February 11, 1925; Seattle, Washington, U.S.
- Died: May 24, 1998 (aged 73)
- Occupations: Teacher and activist
- Known for: Establishing Washington state's first Head Start program

Aki Kurose (February 11, 1925 – May 24, 1998) was an American teacher and social justice activist who helped establish Washington state's first Head Start program and worked to increase access to education and affordable housing, particularly among low-income and minority families.

She was incarcerated with other Japanese Americans during World War II and during this period was exposed to the Quaker values of peace advocacy and nonviolent conflict resolution by Friends working in camp. After the war, she joined several groups in Seattle working for peace, racial equality, and open housing, and became an award-winning elementary school teacher in the Seattle Public Schools system during her 25-year tenure with the district. She is the namesake of a middle school, a low-income housing community and a peace garden in Seattle, and the local chapter of the Japanese American Citizens League awards the Aki Kurose Memorial Scholarship each year.

== Early life ==
Born Akiko Kato in Seattle on February 11, 1925, Kurose was the third of four children. Her parents had immigrated separately – her father Harutoshi arriving from Miyagi prefecture seeking work, her mother Murako from Kumamoto to study – and met through mutual friends in Berkeley, California. They moved to Seattle soon after marrying and leased an apartment building which Murako managed while Harutoshi took a job as a porter at Union Station. (The Katos were unable to purchase the property due to alien land laws which kept Asian immigrants, prohibited by law from naturalized citizenship, from owning land or real estate in Washington.)

From an early age, Kurose was encouraged to think outside expected gender roles by her parents' egalitarian and nontraditional relationship: Her mother obtained an engineer's license, operated the boiler room and furnace, and performed general maintenance around the building, while her father would bake jelly rolls every Friday evening for get-togethers with friends and neighbors.

Kurose lived and went to school with a diverse group of children from her working-class neighborhood in Seattle's Central District. Pushed together by red-lining and restrictive covenants that kept most of the city's neighborhoods off limits to Jews and people of color, the Katos frequently hosted African American, Chinese American and Jewish neighbors at social gatherings in their apartment, and Kurose and her friends "went in and out of each other's homes all the time". Her parents placed little emphasis on traditional Japanese values and cultural ties, and unlike many other Nisei at the time, she and her siblings attended Japanese language school only once a week instead of each day after their regular classes. Kurose instead spent her free time engaged with the Girl Scouts and her high school band and drama club.

== World War II ==
The December 7, 1941, attack on Pearl Harbor came during Kurose's senior year at Garfield High School in Seattle, Washington. She later recalled brushing off her father's worries of trouble, unconcerned as she and her siblings were American citizens – but at school the next day, she was reminded of her "Japaneseness" and unequal status when a teacher told her, "You people bombed Pearl Harbor."

On February 19, 1942, President Franklin Roosevelt issued Executive Order 9066, authorizing military commanders to create zones from which "any or all persons may be excluded," and over the next several months approximately 112,000 Japanese Americans were "evacuated" from the newly established Military Areas 1 and 2. The Katos were removed first to the Puyallup Assembly Center (also known as "Camp Harmony"), where Aki and her family were assigned a one-room "apartment" in a barracks on the parking lot of the requisitioned fairgrounds. The family was later transferred to the War Relocation Authority camp at Minidoka, Idaho.

Kurose completed her high school education in Minidoka and became involved with the American Friends Service Committee (AFSC), which donated books to the camp schools and helped college-age Nisei obtain leave clearance to enroll in universities outside the exclusion zone. She left camp to attend the University of Utah in Salt Lake City but, after encountering problems with her living situation, she was forced to move and ended up at the LDS Business College instead. Kurose returned briefly to Seattle when the West Coast was reopened to Japanese Americans at the end of the war, but soon moved to Wichita, Kansas, and enrolled at Friends University. She graduated in 1948 and returned to Seattle to marry Junelow (Junks) Kurose, her best friend's brother and her brother's best friend. Junks, recently discharged from the Army, had been living in Chicago, where his parents resettled upon their release from camp, and the couple moved there.

== Career and activism ==
In 1950, Kurose had their first child (Hugo, named after Junks' older brother, who had been forcibly conscripted into the Japanese army and died in the Pacific Theater of World War II), and the new family moved back to Seattle soon after. The transition was not easy. Discriminatory real estate practices, combined with a shortage of available housing, made it difficult to find a new home, so the family stayed with Kurose's parents until they were able to move into their own place. The local electrical and construction unions would not admit Japanese Americans, so Junks, an electrician, was unable to find work for some time before eventually taking a job as a Boeing machinist. During this time, Kurose worked for an interracial porter's union her father had started upon his return to Seattle. The city's largely Japanese American workforce had been replaced by African Americans during the incarceration, and employers capitalized on tension between the two ethnic groups when former camp inmates began to return and seek out their old jobs. Harutoshi helped organize the union, and Kurose was appointed its secretary.

Influenced by the discrimination she and her husband faced during their search for a home, Kurose became involved in the open housing movement in the 1950s, working first with the AFSC and later, in the 1960s, joining the Congress of Racial Equality (CORE). During this time, the Kuroses had five more children; Aki enrolled them at a Seattle Freedom School, and brought them with her to civil rights marches and anti-war demonstrations. Sparking what would become a lifelong passion for education, she began taking classes in early-childhood education and development, started working in preschool programs, and joined a group of neighborhood parents to form the state's first Head Start program in 1965.

She began teaching for Seattle Public Schools through Head Start, eventually taking a job at an elementary school in 1974. Two years later, as part of the city's (reluctant and federally-mandated) move to desegregate its public schools, she was transferred from Martin Luther King Jr. Elementary, an urban, predominantly African American school, to the exclusive Laurelhurst Elementary in North Seattle. Her arrival was not welcomed by the parents of the until recently all-white student body, and Kurose was called to a meeting with forty concerned parents to defend her qualifications before she started teaching. (She would later describe the meeting as being "on trial", and recalled a parent telling her, "If you want to bring your rice bowl and chopsticks, it's okay".) During her first month, Kurose was monitored in the classroom each day by two parents, but she gradually won over the skeptical Laurelhurst community. When students of color were bused to Laurelhurst from the city's central area beginning in 1978, Kurose worked to ease their integration into the school and push her fellow teachers to promote a multicultural curriculum.

Despite the initial resistance to her assignment at Laurelhurst, Kurose eventually became one of its most well-loved and respected teachers, both locally and nationally. In 1980, she was appointed by President Jimmy Carter to the National Advisory Council on the Education of Disadvantaged Children. She continued her own education, enrolling in a University of Washington graduate program in 1981 and receiving a Master of Early Childhood Education degree four years later. In the classroom, she encouraged her students to learn through hands-on experience instead of rote memorization, and she received numerous awards for her innovative teaching style. In 1985, she was named the Seattle Teacher of the Year, and in 1990 she was given the Presidential Award for Excellence in Mathematics and Science Teaching (PAEMST). Her work integrating peace advocacy with education was recognized internationally in 1992, when she received the United Nations Human Rights Award.

== Legacy ==
Upon her retirement in 1997, Laurelhurst students and parents dedicated the Aki Kurose Peace Garden on the school grounds. Kurose died the following year, on May 24, after a sixteen-year fight with cancer.

Aki Kurose Village, a family-friendly affordable housing community in North Seattle, opened in 1999, and in 2000 the Casper W. Sharples Junior High was renamed the Aki Kurose Middle School Academy, the first Seattle school named after an Asian American woman. Additionally, the Seattle JACL created the Aki Kurose Memorial Scholarship after her death, awarded annually to a Seattle Public Schools graduate applying to a Seattle community college or Washington state public university.

== See also ==
- List of people from Seattle
