= Chief Sealth International High School =

Location
- 2600 SW Thistle Street; Seattle, Washington 98126; 47°31′47″N 122°21′58″W

Information
- Type: High School
- Motto: "Empowering learners to be of value to themselves and to others, today and tomorrow"
- Established: 1957
- Principal: Hope Perry
- Faculty: 66.20 (FTE)
- Enrollment: 1,201 (2023-2024)
- Student to teacher ratio: 18.14
- Colors: Columbia Blue, White & Red
- Mascot: Seahawk
- Website: chiefsealthhs.seattleschools.org

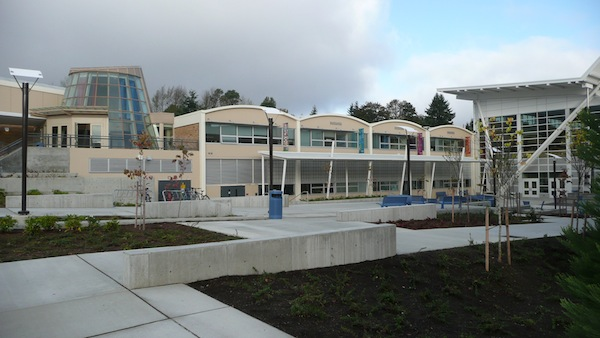
Chief Sealth High School (2010)

Chief Sealth International High School (CSIHS) is a public high school in the Seattle Public Schools district of Seattle, Washington. Opened in 1957 in southern West Seattle, Chief Sealth students comprise one of the most ethnically and culturally diverse student bodies in Washington State. The school is named for Chief Seattle, a Duwamish chief and a recognized leader amongst the local peoples at the time of the arrival of European American settlers in the area. The school shares a campus with Denny International Middle School.

== Students ==
The student population at CSIHS is culturally and linguistically diverse. In the 2010–11 school year, the student population was identified as 2.2% American Indian/Alaskan Native, 17.7% Asian, 2.1% Pacific Islander, 19.8% Asian/Pacific Islander, 24.7% African-American, 20.6% Hispanic, 31.7% Caucasian, and 1% Two or More Races. 54.8% of the students qualified for free or reduced meals.

== Academics ==
Chief Sealth offers academy-based programs, including the Academy of Finance, Academy of Travel and Tourism, Graphic Arts, Performing Arts, Proyecto Saber, Sports Marketing, and Project Lead the Way.

=== International program ===
In 2010 the District Superintendent designated Chief Sealth as the first "International" high school, which meant that its curriculum would include a multi-cultural education. Chief Sealth International High School is an accredited International Baccalaureate (IB) school, offering IB courses and the full IB diploma program since 2007. The school offers foreign language courses, including a focus on Spanish, Japanese, and Mandarin Chinese.

=== Confucius Institute ===
CSIHS is a partner of the Confucius Institute of Washington, part of a worldwide program on Chinese language and culture; the institute's Education Center is now located within the new DIMS/CSIHS facility.

=== Project Lead The Way ===
CSIHS offers the Project Lead the Way (PLTW) Pathway To Engineering program, designed to provide rigorous and innovative science, technology, engineering and math (STEM) education. Facilities include a computer-design lab, prototyping lab (shared with DIMS), and a wood shop.

=== Proyecto Saber ===
Begun in 1975 at Chief Sealth High School, Proyecto Saber (Spanish for "Project: To Know") is a "school within a school" tutoring program, providing help in all academic areas to the neighborhood's Latino community. Currently, there are about 250 students enrolled in courses offered by this program at CSIHS and DIMS in the Seattle Public Schools District. With an education-can-make-all-the-difference mantra, Proyecto Saber not only provides homework assistance, but also offers workshops that deal with topics such as racism, leadership, famous Latin Americans, etc. There is also a mariachi band, a youth club and an annual Cinco de Mayo assembly.

=== Documentaries and exhibits ===
Chief Sealth students have produced several documentaries, including The Diaries of High Point, which won an Emmy Award. An environmental studies pilot program incorporating photography, environmental research, and service learning, supported by wildlife photographer Art Wolfe (a Sealth alum), provides opportunities for Sealth students to mentor students at nearby schools. Students in the Sports Marketing program have researched and documented Negro league baseball player movements in the western United States, focusing on the career of Buck O'Neil. In 2004, Chief Sealth High School hosted the first Negro Leagues Baseball Museum exhibit on the west coast. In 2006, Sealth students, Chunda Zeng, Jasdeep Saran, and Yuto Fukushige, rode bicycles from Seattle to Kansas City, Missouri to raise funds for the museum's Buck O'Neil Education & Research Center. In 2007, Chief Sealth seniors earned more than 1.4 million dollars in grant and scholarship money for college.

== Performing arts ==
CSIHS offers a performing arts program as part of a shared 6–12 pathway with DIMS. The schools have aligned their music programs which incorporate a global perspective in the selection of music and instruments as well as partnerships with the Seattle Repertory Theatre and Paramount Theatre. The program offers Intermediate Choir, Honor Choir, Mariachi, Jazz Band, Concert/Marching Band, Orchestra, Steel Drums, Piano, and Men's Vocal Ensemble.

== Athletics ==
The school has some of the best athletic facilities in the Seattle School District, including the Nino Cantu Southwest Athletic Complex, its largest gymnasium, and two practice gyms. Athletic programs include:

- Fall: cross country, football, girls' soccer, golf, volleyball
- Winter: boys' basketball, girls' basketball, gymnastics, swimming, wrestling
- Spring: baseball, fastpitch, boys' soccer, boys' & girls' track, tennis

Its recent principal (until 2011), John Boyd, is himself a former Sealth Seahawk, who graduated in 1982. Nicknamed "Vanilla Thunder", Boyd was the leading scorer (16.1 points per game) on Chief Sealth's 1982 boys' basketball team (24 and 2, 4th in Washington State). They had All-Metro honors for two consecutive years and retired Boyd's jersey number 24.

Chief Sealth's mascot is the Seahawk, which pre-dates and has no relation to the local NFL team, the Seattle Seahawks.

== History and facilities ==
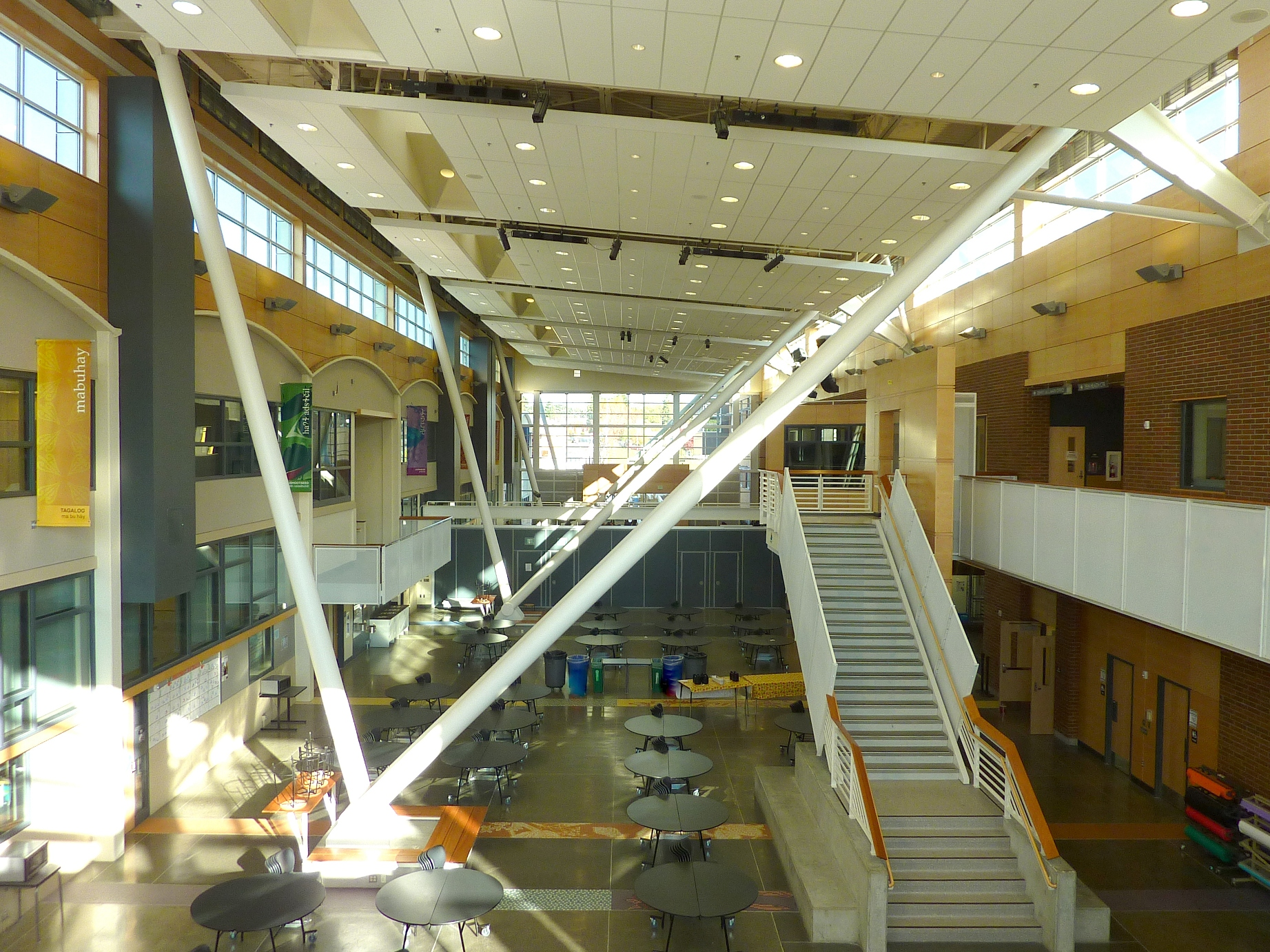
Chief Sealth High School Galleria (added 2010)

In 1954 the Seattle School District began planning for its first new high school in three decades to serve the burgeoning population in southwest Seattle. Architects Naramore, Bain, Brady & Johnson designed the new factory-model school with "thin-shell" barrel vaulted roofs. The new school was constructed on a 17.45-acre site for a capacity of 1,200. It opened in 1957 with 900 students in grades 9–11. The first graduates were the Class of 1959. By 1960–61, 13 portable classrooms were added to serve a peak enrollment of 2,206 in 1962–63. An addition in 1969 infilled one of four interior courtyards to provide a library and business education area.

In 1988 creation of a "mega-Sealth" was proposed, but never realized. The plan included closing West Seattle High School, consolidating the students at CSHS, expanding CSHS into Denny Middle School, and consolidating Denny students into both Boren and Madison Middle Schools.

In 2008 the school was relocated to the former Boren Middle School during construction for a major upgrade and expansion. On September 8, 2010, Chief Sealth re-opened in the newly renovated facility. Denny International Middle School opened in the newly expanded facility in September, 2011. The much larger building supports grades 6–12, including students from CSIHS and DIMS. The renovation included removal of portable classrooms, seismic upgrades, new mechanical, technology and fire protection systems, energy-efficiency upgrades, revamped auditorium, expanded music facilities, new finishes, and addition of new shared spaces. Both schools remain distinct within the shared facility, although some spaces such as the renovated CSIHS auditorium and the new two-story Galleria are shared between the schools. The design of the renovation and expansion was undertaken by Bassetti Architects of Seattle.

=== Nino Cantu Southwest Athletics Complex ===
The complex, the second largest in the Seattle Public Schools, includes Chief Sealth Stadium. The facility was upgraded in 2008 to include a full size synthetic turf football/soccer field surrounded by a rubberized running track and covered bleachers, and three synthetic turf baseball and softball infields. In 2012 the complex was increased by 6 acres with the demolition of the old Denny International Middle School. The expansion includes tennis courts and a softball field, replacements for those removed from the CSIHS campus to accommodate the new DIMS, and a school district-owned park designed for a future elementary school.

Adjacent to the complex is the Southwest Community Center which includes a gymnasium, Southwest Teen Life Center, and the indoor Southwest Pool. It was constructed in 1974 and is operated by the Seattle Parks Department.

== Recruiting scandal ==
In 2006, the school's girls' basketball team was stripped of their 2004 and 2005 state championship titles, and barred from playing in the 2007 tournament after it had been revealed coaches participated in illegal recruiting. Six Sealth Ladyhawks players had been enticed to transfer to the school with promises of starting positions and college scholarships.

== Notable alumni ==
- Anita M. Cal, author, screenwriter, and Emmy Award-winning TV and film producer
- Rondin Johnson, baseball player
- Keone Kela, baseball player
- Meg Tilly, actress, Broadway stage dancer, writer, and Academy Award nominee (graduated Chief Sealth HS after attending part of final year in British Columbia)
- Art Wolfe, photographer
