= Quincy Jones (comedian) =

American stand-up comedian (born 1984)

Quincy Jones (real name Quami Wallen; born June 2, 1984) is an American stand-up comedian who rose to fame when his dying wish of recording a comedy special was granted.

== Early life ==
Jones graduated from Middle College High School in the Northgate neighborhood of Seattle, Washington in 2002. He was inspired to become a stand up comedian by watching Chris Rock. He began performing comedy in 2006, and six years later moved to Los Angeles to pursue comedy full-time. He estimates that in one year, he performed stand up over 1,000 times.

== Diagnosis and comedy special ==
In August 2015, Jones was diagnosed with Stage IV mesothelioma and given one year to live. He began receiving treatment with chemotherapy. Friends set up a Kickstarter campaign to raise money to produce a stand-up special starring Jones, and his story went viral after he appeared on Ellen. After successfully raising over $50,000, Jones filmed a comedy special at the Teragram Ballroom in Los Angeles on April 4, 2016, titled Burning the Light, and it aired on HBO on June 2.

Despite his initial terminal prognosis, Jones has continued to survive his diagnosis for over a decade. Following a move to New York City to continue performing, he faced significant online skepticism and accusations of exaggerating his illness due to his unexpected long-term survival, which he publicly refuted in 2019 by providing medical documentation. In late 2021, Jones experienced a mesothelioma relapse accompanied by kidney failure, requiring multiple weeks of hospitalization. After recovering and managing his condition with ongoing treatments, including chemotherapy and planned immunotherapy, he returned to Los Angeles to resurrect his comedy career. As of 2024, Jones continues to actively perform stand-up comedy, describing his ongoing survival as a testament to specialized medical care and his dedication to his craft.
