= South Lake High School =

South Lake High School may refer to:

- South Lake High School (Florida)
- South Lake High School (Michigan)
- South Lake High School (Seattle)
