= Frank B. Cooper School =

Coordinates: 47°33′45″N 122°21′29″W

- Frank B. Cooper Elementary School
- U.S. National Register of Historic Places
- Seattle Landmark
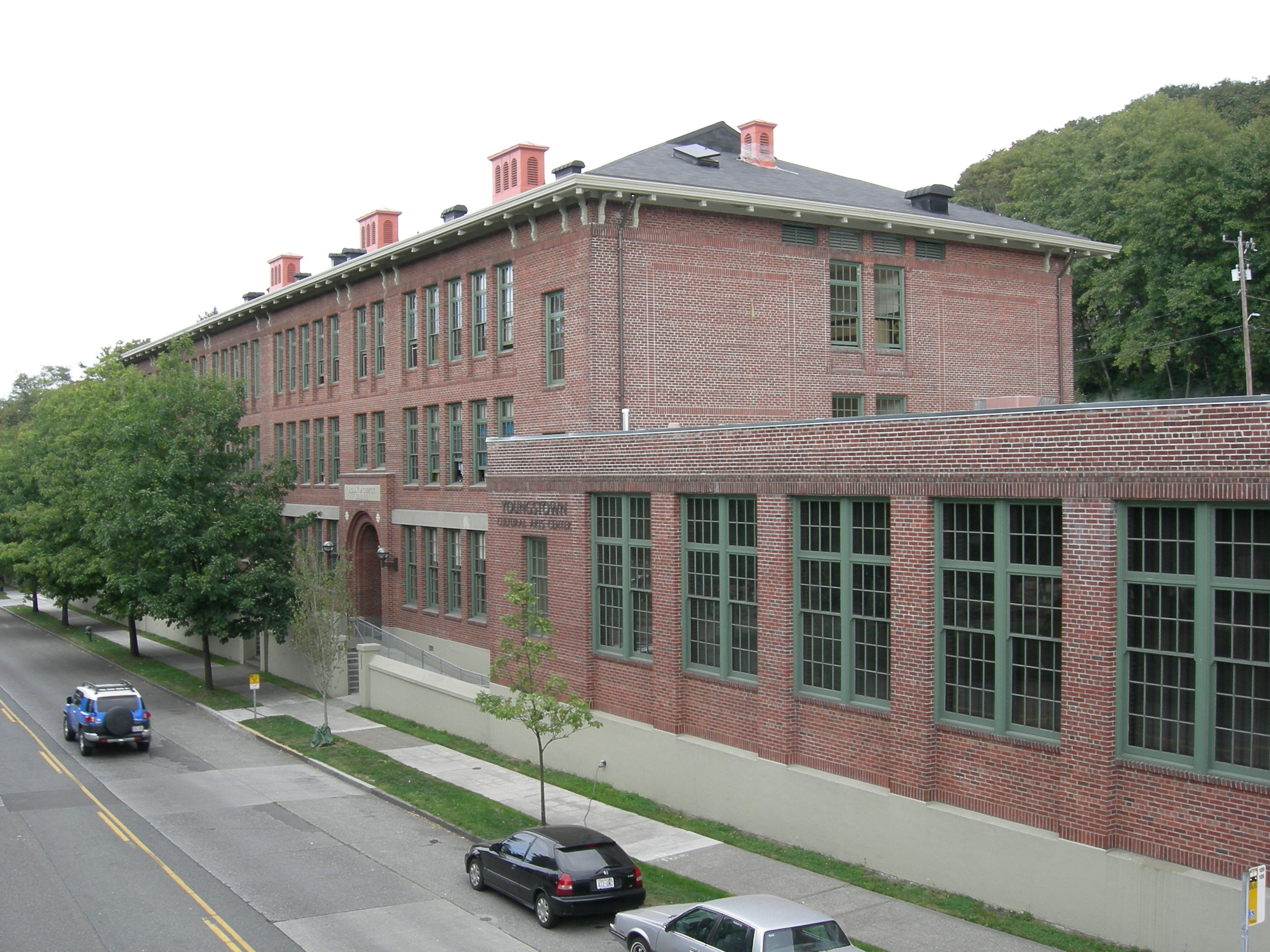
- The old Frank B. Cooper School, now Youngstown Cultural Arts Center
- Location: Delridge, Seattle, Washington
- Built: 1917, expanded 1929
- Architect: Edgar Blair, Floyd A. Naramore
- NRHP reference No.: 03000161

Significant dates
- Added to NRHP: 2003
- Designated SEATL: July 18, 2005

Frank B. Cooper Elementary School, usually called Cooper School, serves students from kindergarten through 5th grade. Located in the Pigeon Point neighborhood of Delridge, Seattle, Washington, it is part of the Seattle Public Schools district. The school's 14-acre (57,000 m^{2}) site is immediately adjacent to the 182-acre (0.74 km^{2}) West Duwamish Greenbelt, one of Seattle's largest wildlife habitat corridors. This rich natural environment enhances the school's environmental education program.

While the current building, located at 1901 SW Genesee Street, was opened in 1999, Cooper School enjoys a long history in the community, dating back to 1906, when a group of 70 students, children of steel mill workers, attended classes at Youngstown School in a small building offered by the Seattle Steel Company. A year later, a wooden building—known as Riverside School—was built for the school at the base of Pigeon Hill. As the population of the community grew, the wooden structure was replaced by a brick building 1917, which was designed by Edgar Blair, with a 1929 expansion designed by Floyd Naramore. In 1939, the school was renamed to honor Frank B. Cooper, a former Seattle school superintendent. The historic Youngstown School building, located at 4408 Delridge Way SW, now houses the Cooper Artist Housing and Youngstown Cultural Arts Center. It is listed in the National Register of Historic Places.

One of the school's assets is its diversity. Approximately 80 percent of Cooper students are racial or ethnic minorities and approximately one-quarter are bilingual.

The first African American teacher hired to teach in Seattle Public Schools, Thelma Dewitty, worked at Cooper School from 1947 until 1953. The Thelma DeWitty Theater at the Youngstown Cultural Arts Center is named after her.

On Thursday January 29, 2009, the Seattle School Board voted to close Cooper Elementary School and move the Pathfinder K-8 program to the Cooper campus.
