= The Nova Project =

High school in Seattle, Washington, U.S.

Coordinates: 47°37′21″N 122°18′20″W

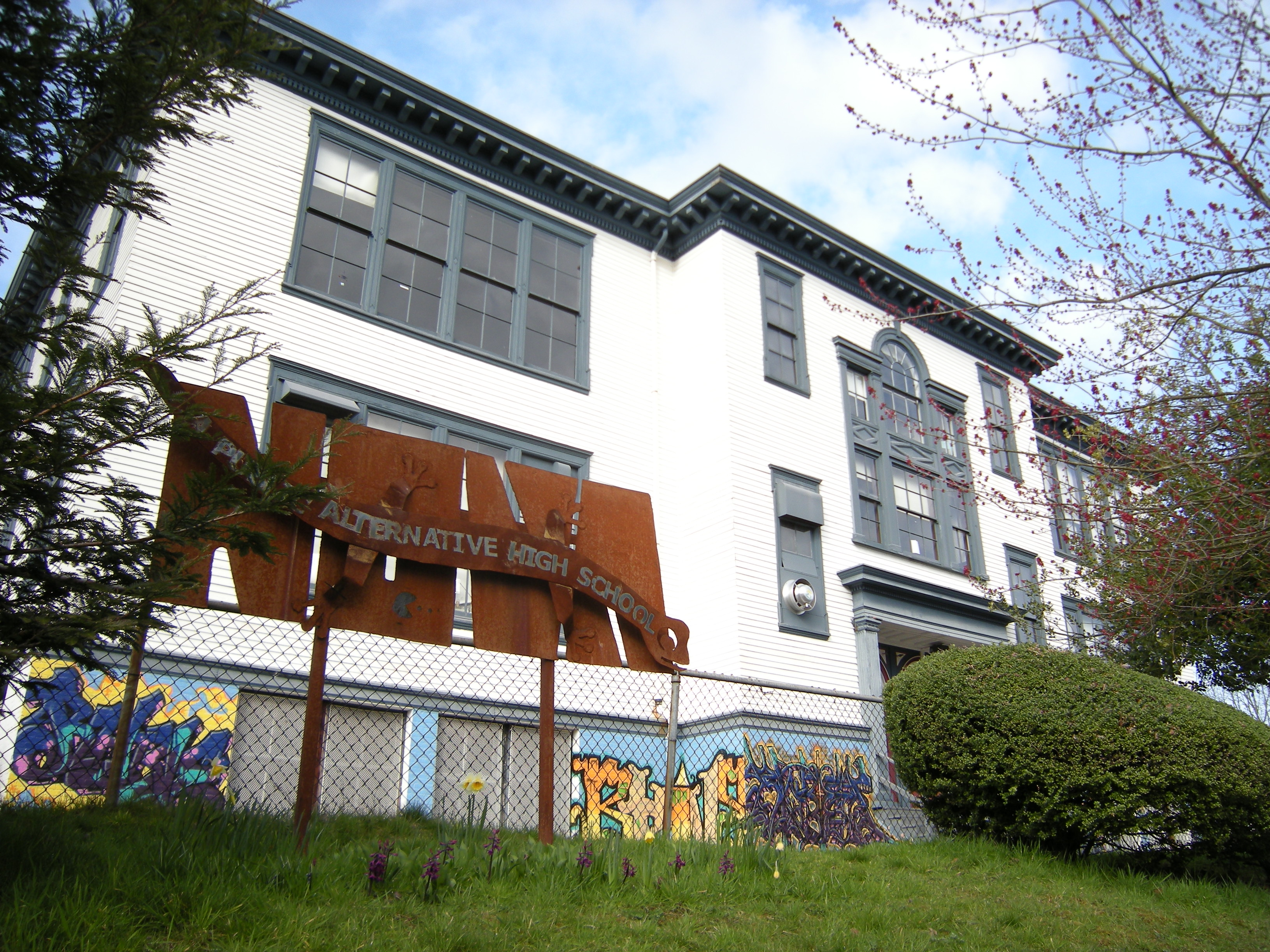
- 2410 E. Cherry St. Seattle, Washington 98122

Information
- Type: Alternative, Public
- Established: 1970
- Principal: Eyva Winet
- Faculty: 25
- Enrollment: 280 Students
- Colors: Black on black, on blacker black, on blacker-than-black-black
- Website: novahs.seattleschools.org

The Nova Project, also simply known as Nova, is a small public alternative high school in Seattle, Washington, in the Seattle Public School District. Its aim is to be a "democratically governed learning community of broadly educated, creative, and independent thinkers who work collaboratively and demonstrate a high degree of individual responsibility."

== About ==
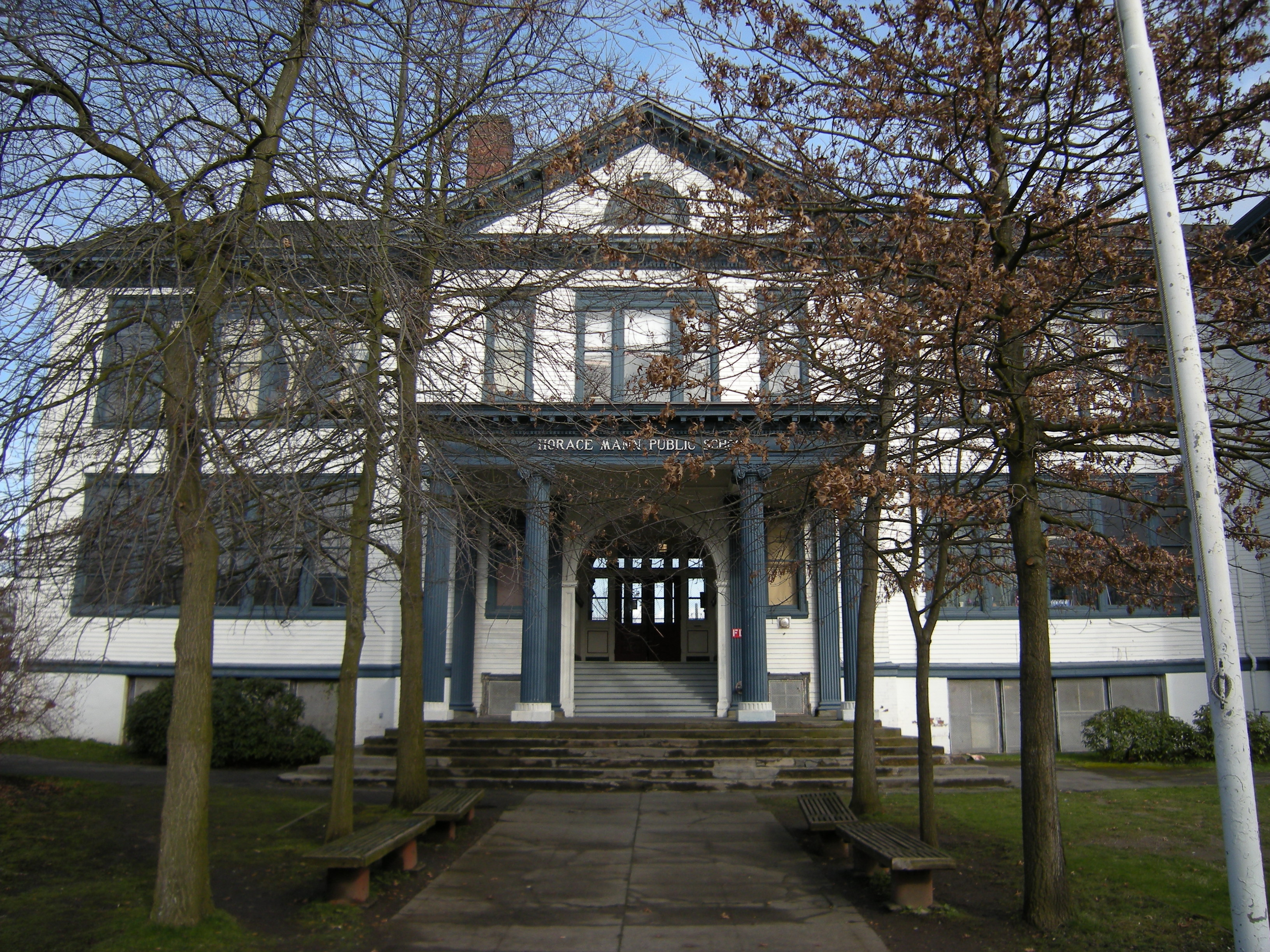
The former Horace Mann School, site of Nova for most of its history.

Nova was founded by a group of students, parents and teachers in 1970. The curriculum is multidisciplinary and project-oriented, with an emphasis on individualized learning contracts, internships and community service. Nova functions through student-run, teacher-supported committees that decide school budgeting, the hiring and review process of staff, discussion forums, orientation of new students, and cultural affairs.

The credit system is competency-based which means students receive either full, partial or no credit. Each student picks a teacher to be their coordinator, with whom they design a personal learning plan. As of the 2022-2023 school year, Nova's 4 year graduation rate was 70%. Nova classes include every grade (9-12). Class size varies but they tend to be quite small ranging from ten to twenty students. However, some classes can be smaller, such as classes for students with special needs or lab-based science classes. Nova students have the option of creating "independent contracts" with their teachers to earn credit for extracurricular projects and activities. It is common for Nova students to co-teach classes with their teachers, generating curriculum and building facilitation skills in line with Nova's student-led philosophy. Like other Seattle Public Schools students, Nova students may participate in the Running Start program and take classes at a local community college.

== Notable staff, alumni and former students ==
- Reiko Aylesworth, actress best known from the TV series 24
- Stephen Funk, the first U.S. military service member to publicly refuse to deploy to the US war in Iraq
- Stefan Gruber, animator and performance artist
- America Hoffman, son of Abbie Hoffman
- Rose McGowan, actress and singer
- Bonnie McKee, singer and songwriter
- Brisa Roché, musician
