= Seattle Public Schools =

Public school system of Seattle, Washington. U.S.

Seattle Public School System

Address
- 2445 3rd Ave. S. Seattle, Washington, 98134; United States
- Coordinates: 47°34′50″N 122°19′51″W

District information
- Type: Public
- Motto: Every student achieving, everyone accountable
- Grades: Pre-K through 12
- Established: January 3, 1867; 159 years ago
- Superintendent: Ben Shuldiner
- Budget: $1,044,890,979 (FY 2019–2020)
- NCES District ID: 5307710

Students and staff
- Students: 50,773
- Teachers: 3,073

Other information
- Website: seattleschools.org

Incorporated and Unincorporated areas of King County, with Seattle highlighted

Seattle Public Schools is the largest public school district in the state of Washington. The school district serves almost all of Seattle. Additionally it includes sections of Boulevard Park and Tukwila. As of the 2023-2024 academic year, 104 schools are operated by the district, which serve 49,226 students throughout the city.

== Governance ==
The board of directors for Seattle Public Schools is an elected body representing seven geographical regions, known as Districts, within the City of Seattle. The length of the term is four years. Board meetings are generally held twice monthly. For the 2019–2020 school year (until COVID-19 disruptions), board meetings were scheduled for the first and third Wednesdays of each month, at 4:15 p.m., with some exceptions. Its headquarters are in the John Stanford Center for Educational Excellence.

School board members
Director	Geographical district	Notes
Liza Rankin	I	
Kathleen Smith	II	
Evan Briggs	III	Vice president
Joe Mizrahi	IV	Member at large
Vivian Song	V	
Gina Topp	VI	President
Jen LaVallee	VII	

== History ==
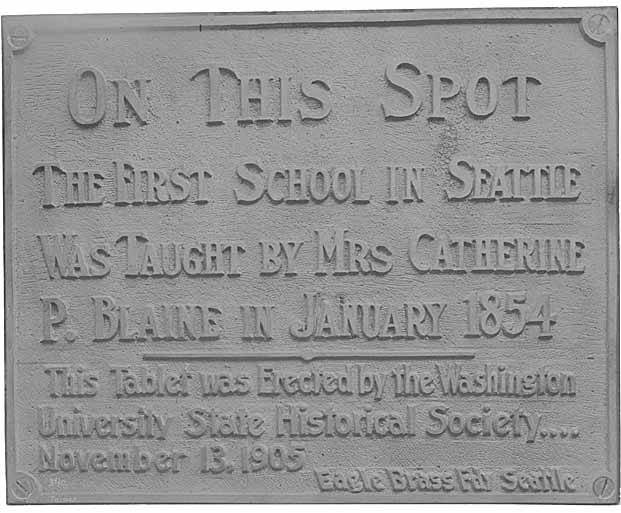
A historical marker for Seattle's first school

Thomas E. Peiser photographed a 1905 historical marker commemorating the site of Seattle's first school. According to the marker: On this spot the first school in Seattle was taught by Mrs Catherine P. Blaine in January 1854. This tablet was erected by the Washington University State Historical Society November 13, 1905. Eagle Brass Fdy (foundry) Seattle.

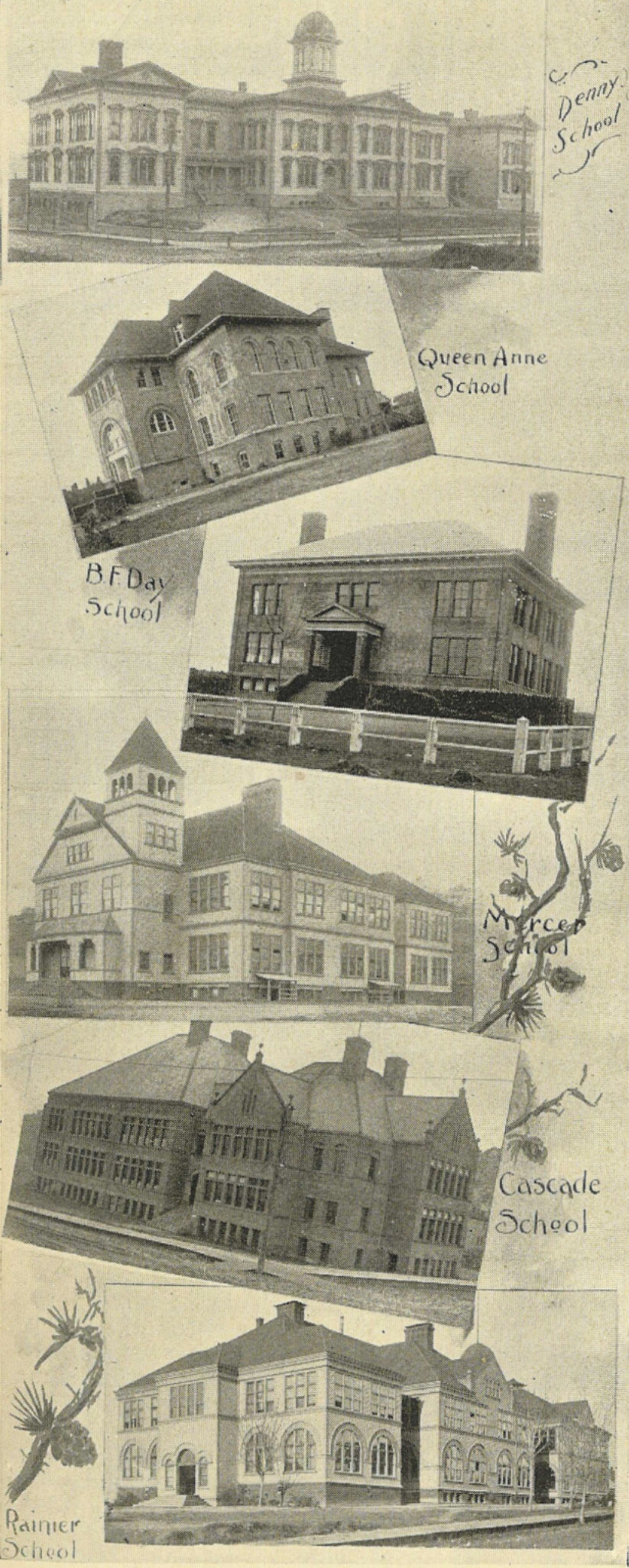
Six Seattle public elementary schools in 1900.

Like most city school systems, the district has had to face controversy dealing with problems concerning racial tension, student population assignments, and administrative scandal; such incidents include a student boycott in 1966 and using "racial tie-breakers" which led to a 2007 Supreme Court case.

=== Early schools ===
When the University of Washington was founded as the Territorial University in 1861, its initial class offerings were not at a level that would now be considered those of a college or university. Its first class offering was a primary school (elementary school) taught by Asa Mercer, and for some years it was jointly supervised by the newly formed Seattle School Board its own Board of Regents. It functioned as Seattle's first public school.

In 1867, the public school moved to what was then the County Building on Third Avenue between James and Jefferson, the site of today's Prefontaine Fountain. A year later, the school moved to Yesler's Pavilion (later Yesler's Hall) at present-day First and Cherry. A year later the school moved again to a temporary building (called Bacon's Hall after its first teacher, Carrie Bacon) located at the site of the present King County Court House. In 1870 the first "permanent" school building, the Central School, opened on Third Avenue between Madison and Spring Streets. It originally had two classrooms; a third was built in its attic in 1881.

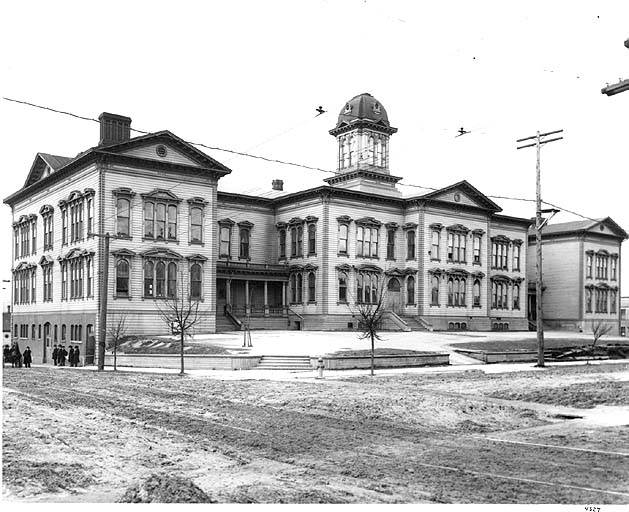
Denny School, 1905

Meanwhile, in 1873 the two-room North School opened at Third and Pine, and in 1875 the school district had purchased 1.4 acres (5,700 m^{2}) at 6th and Madison, where the Sixth Street School, also known as Eastern School, opened promptly in a temporary building and grew into successively larger and better-built buildings in 1877 and 1883. The latter, an "elegant wooden building" with an imposing "French mansard roof, clock tower, and tall central belfry" superseded the old Central School as well as the North School. From 1884, it was known as the Central School. Classes extended through 12th grade, and the first class graduated from 12th grade in 1886. However the school burned in 1888.

The district had, in this period, started a number of other schools, including the even more imposing Denny School on Battery Street between 5th and 6th Avenues in Belltown, opened 1884. Described as "an architectural jewel... the finest schoolhouse on the West Coast," it was demolished in 1928 as part of the Denny Regrade project. When the Central School burned in 1888, its high school and first grade classes were parcelled out to the Denny School, other classes to the former downtown building of the university, with other classes going to temporary facilities, some of which also burned, in the Great Seattle Fire.

A new brick Central School opened in 1889 at Seventh and Madison, and was repeatedly expanded with annexes and extensions. After Seattle High School opened in 1902, the Central School was briefly known in 1903 as the Washington School before returning to its older name. The Central School functioned as an elementary school until 1938, and then until 1949 as the Central Branch of the Edison Technical School. The building was fatally damaged by the 1949 earthquake and razed in 1953; its site is now under Interstate 5.

=== 20th century ===
In 1919, there were 64 grammar schools, six high schools, two parental schools (comparable to today's youth detention centers), a school for the deaf, and nine "special schools... for pupils who do not progress normally in regular classes."

In the early 20th century, Seattle Public Schools were "exemplary" under the leadership (1901–1922) of superintendent Frank B. Cooper and a series of "civic-minded progressives" who served on the Seattle school board.

=== 21st century ===
In 2005, it was revealed that a teacher at Broadview-Thomson Elementary had been serially molesting children at the school for a period spanning several years. The teacher, Laurence E. "Shayne" Hill, had been molesting children for at least four of the twelve years he worked at the school, according to the Seattle Weekly. The article also said that several school officials had known of the inappropriate touching and did nothing to stop it, drawing outrage from concerned parents. Hill is serving his sentence as of December 2, 2005 and is facing anywhere from five years to life.

In June 2006, Andrew J. Coulson of the Cato Institute wrote a column in the Seattle Post-Intelligencer taking the district to task for a page on "equity and race relations" on its website that indicated, in his words, that "only whites can be racist in America" and which, among other things, stated that "Emphasizing individualism as opposed to a more collective ideology" and that this and preferring a "future time orientation" were forms of "cultural racism." The page was removed from the site the same day.

In June 2007, the United States Supreme Court decided the case of Parents Involved in Community Schools v. Seattle School District No. 1, where they rejected Seattle Public Schools longstanding use of "racial tie-breakers" in assigning students to schools. The decision prohibited assigning students to public schools solely for the purpose of achieving racial integration and declined to recognize racial balancing as a compelling state interest. In a fragmented opinion delivered by Chief Justice John Roberts, five justices held that the School Boards did not present any "compelling state interest" that would justify the assignment of school seats on the basis of race. Chief Justice Roberts wrote that "the way to stop discrimination on the basis of race is to stop discriminating on the basis of race." Associate Justice Anthony Kennedy filed a concurrence that presented a more narrow interpretation, stating that schools may use "race conscious" means to achieve diversity in schools but that the schools at issue in this case did not use a sufficient narrow tailoring of their plans to sustain their goals. Four justices dissented from the Court's conclusions.

In January 2013, the entire teaching body of Garfield High School refused to administer the standardized Measures of Academic Progress, or MAP, which is administered system-wide, three times per year. The teachers called the tests useless and a waste of instructional time. The American Federation of Teachers has endorsed the school's boycott of the tests. Garfield's boycott of the test quickly expanded to other Seattle schools and drew national attention. In May 2013 Superintendent Jose Banda announced that the Seattle School District will no longer require MAP tests at city high schools.

In September 2024, SPS announced two possible school closure lists it is considering to help address the $100 million budget deficit. One scenario would close 21 schools, keep 52 schools open, and save an estimated $31.5 million annually. The other scenario would close 17 schools, keep 56 schools open, and save an estimated $26 million annually. 16 schools appear on both closure lists, with K-8 and option schools heavily impacted.

=== Historic architecture ===
Several former Seattle Public Schools buildings are on the National Register of Historic Places (NRHP):

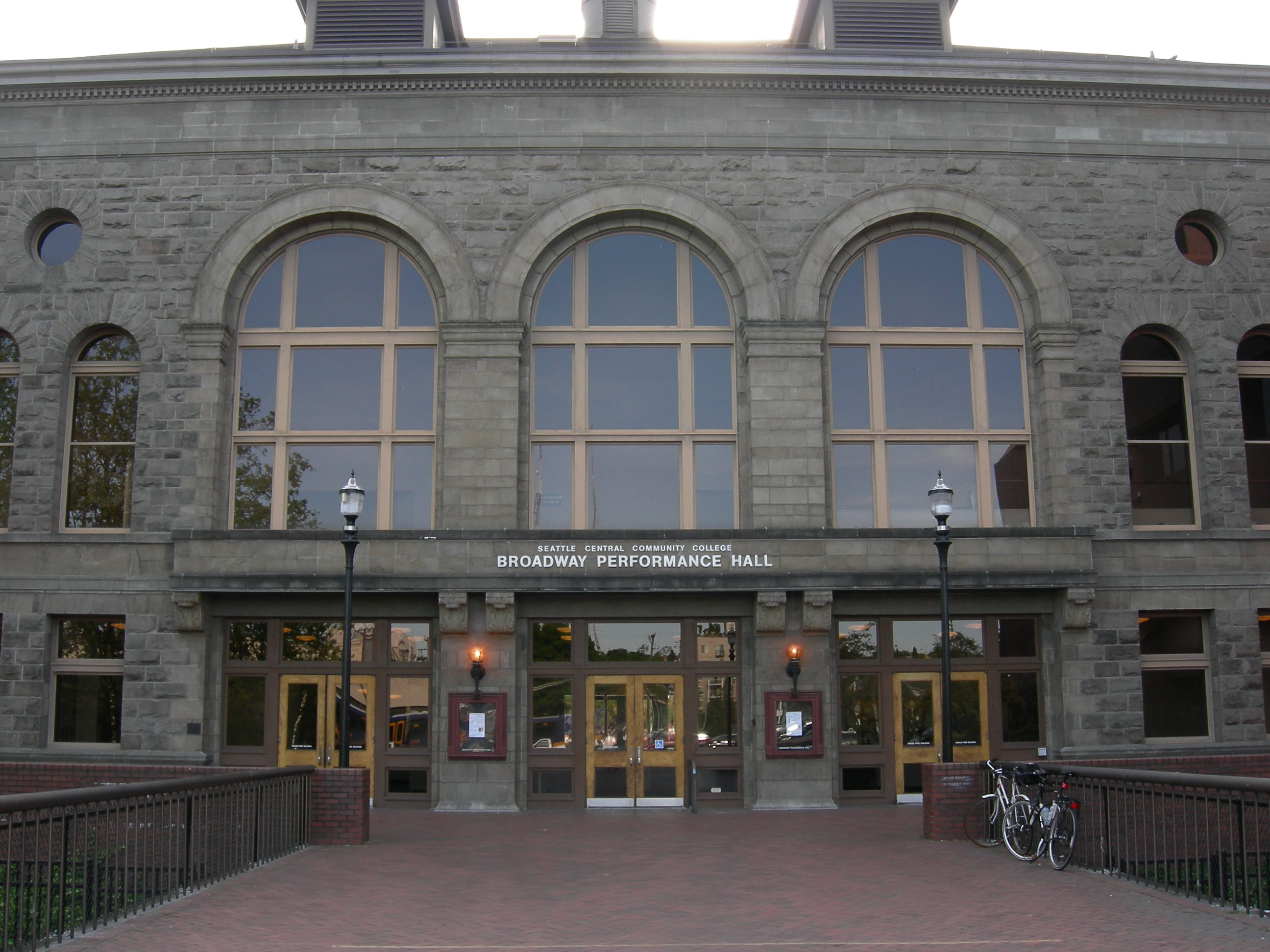
Broadway High School, incorporated into Seattle Central Community College.

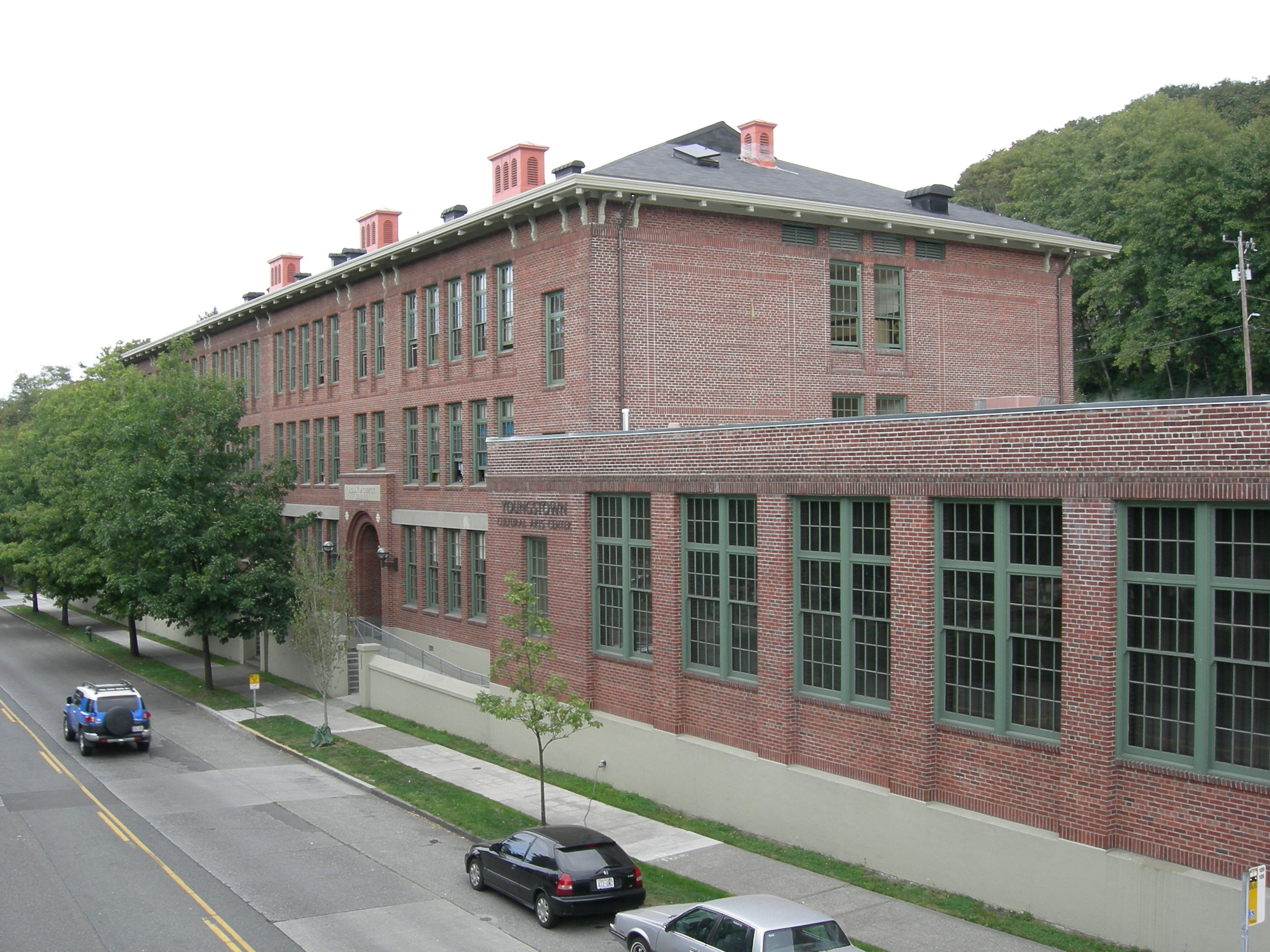
Old Frank B. Cooper Elementary School, now Youngstown Cultural Arts Center.

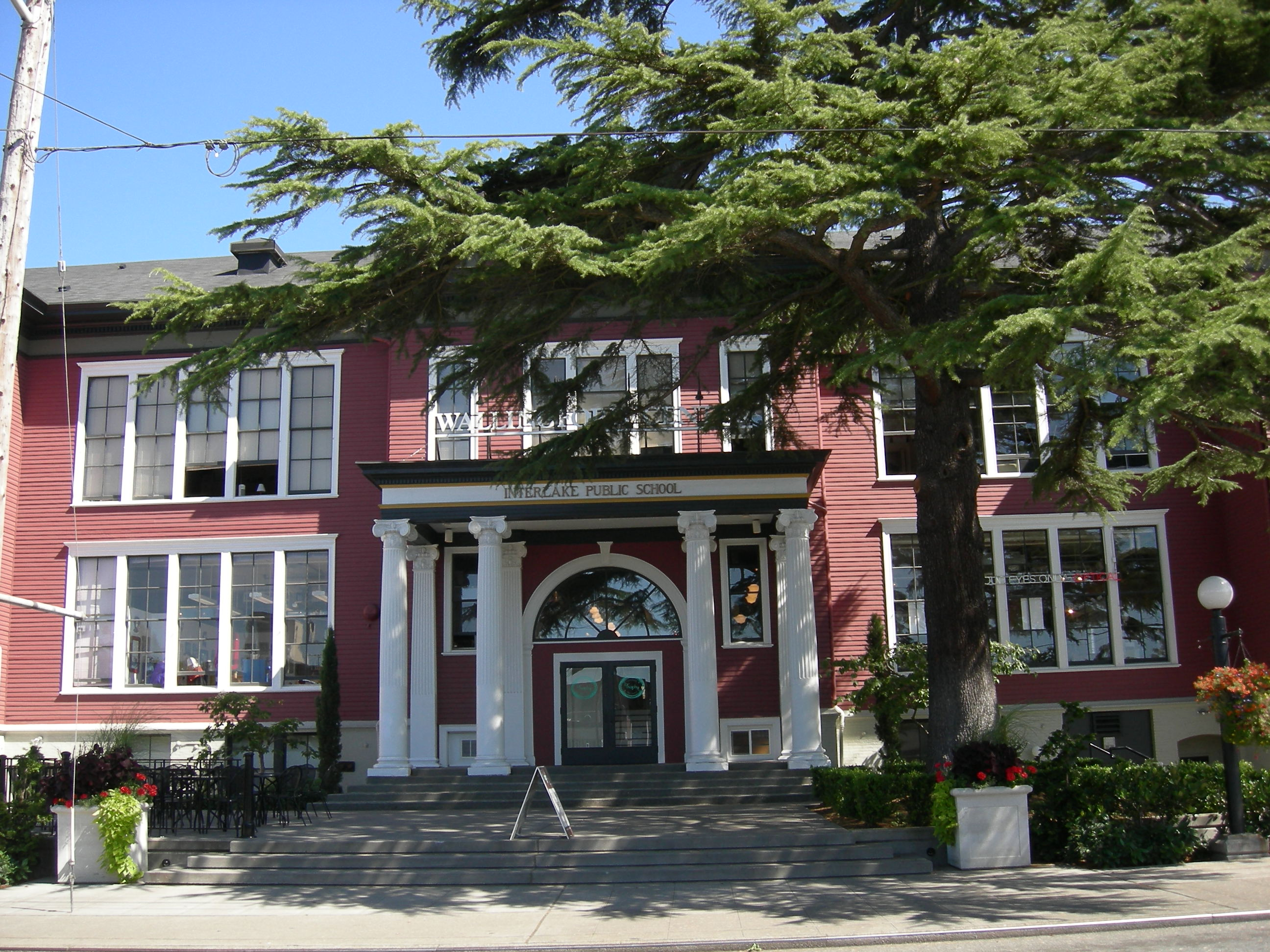
Interlake Public School, now Wallingford Center.

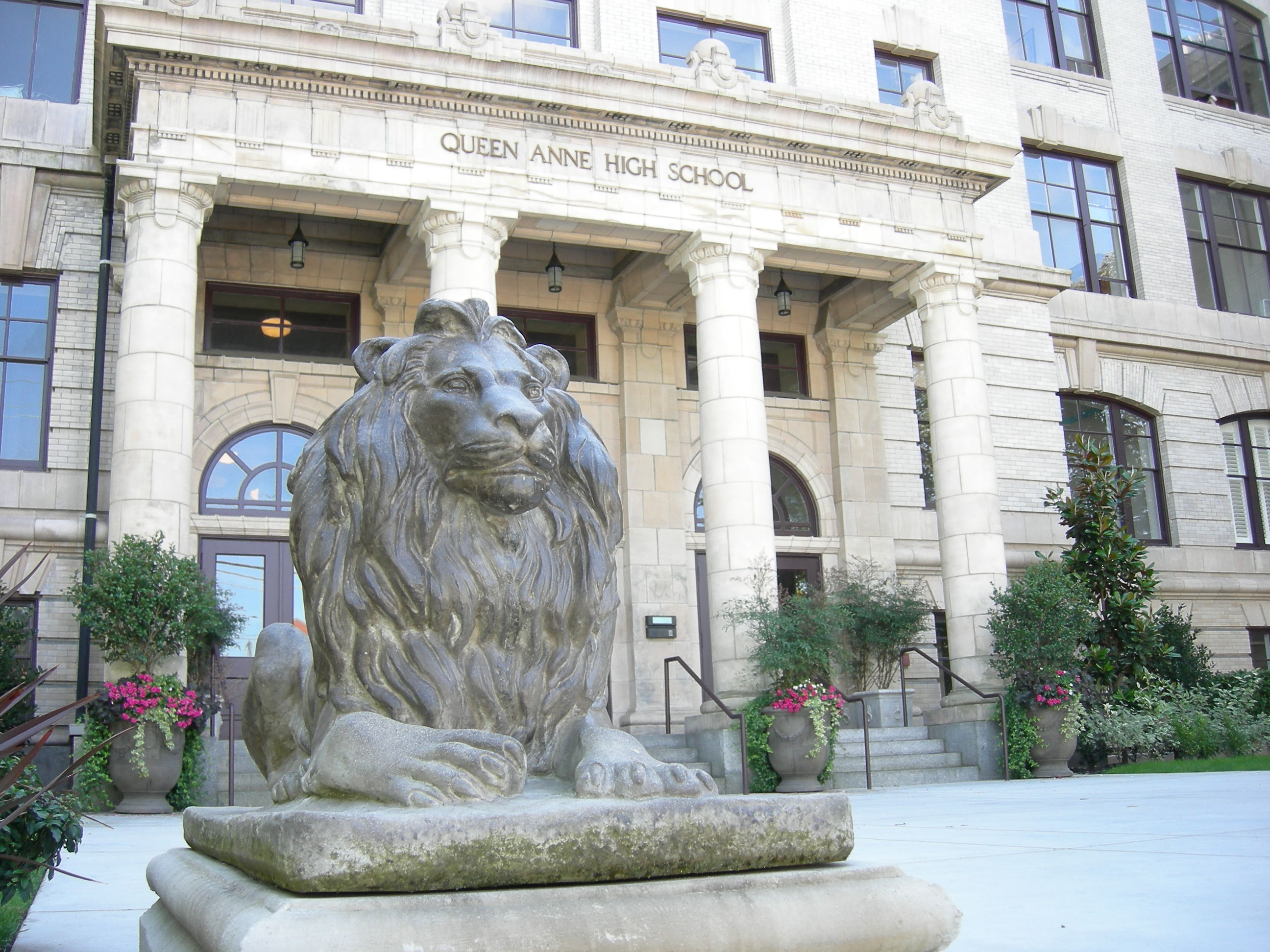
Queen Anne High School.

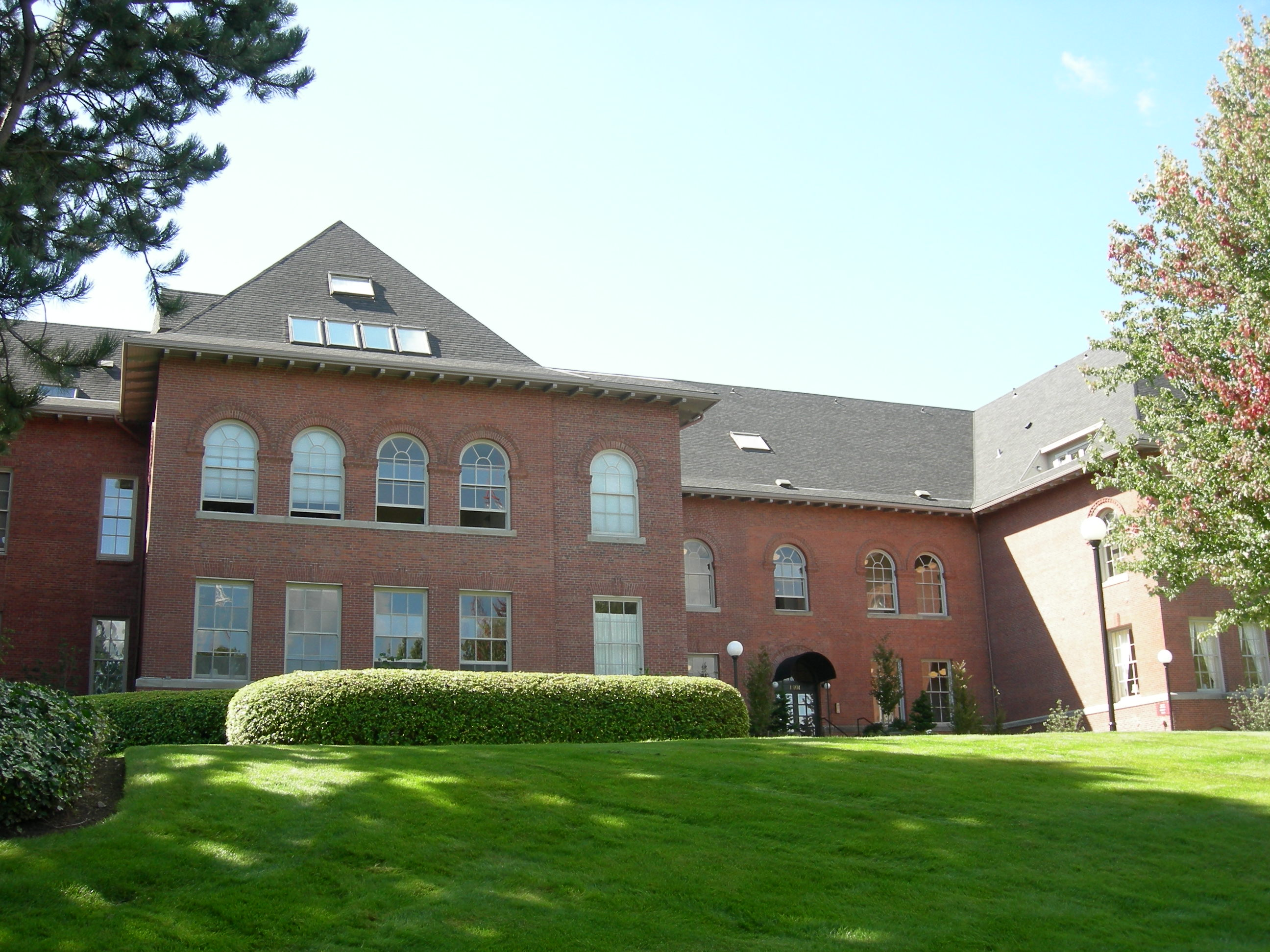
Queen Anne Public School, later West Queen Anne School

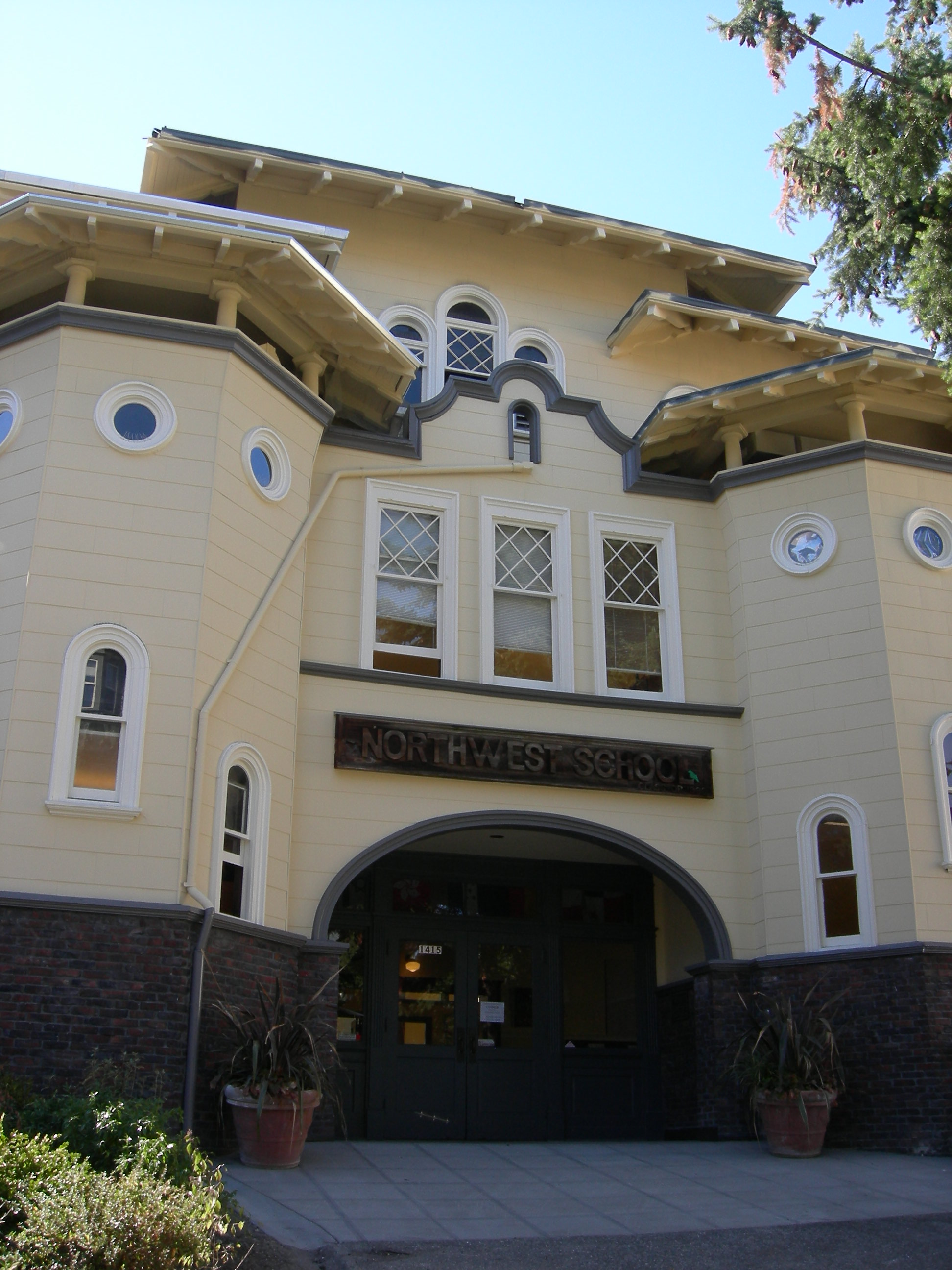
Old Summit School.

== Notable schools ==
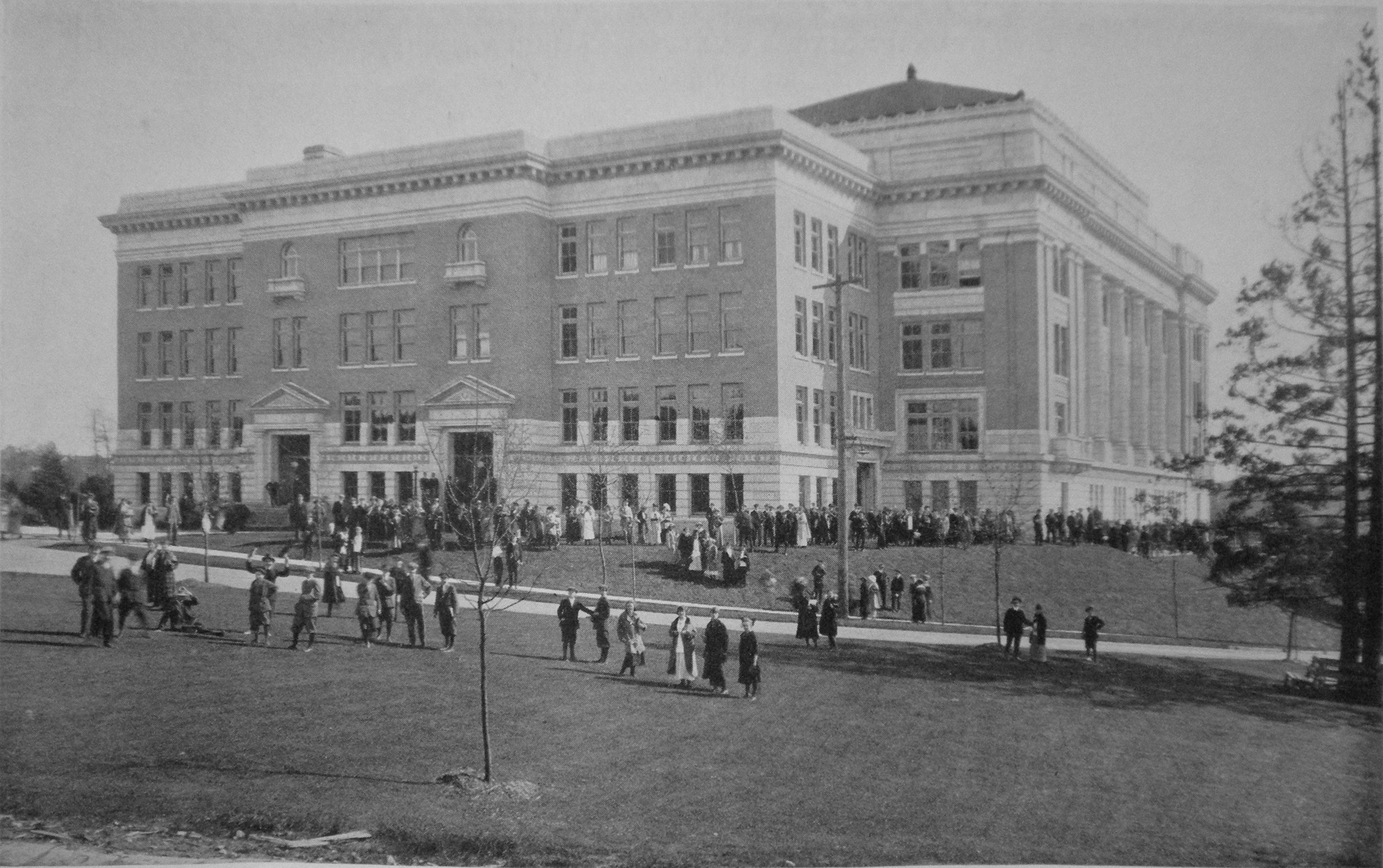
Franklin High School, 1915

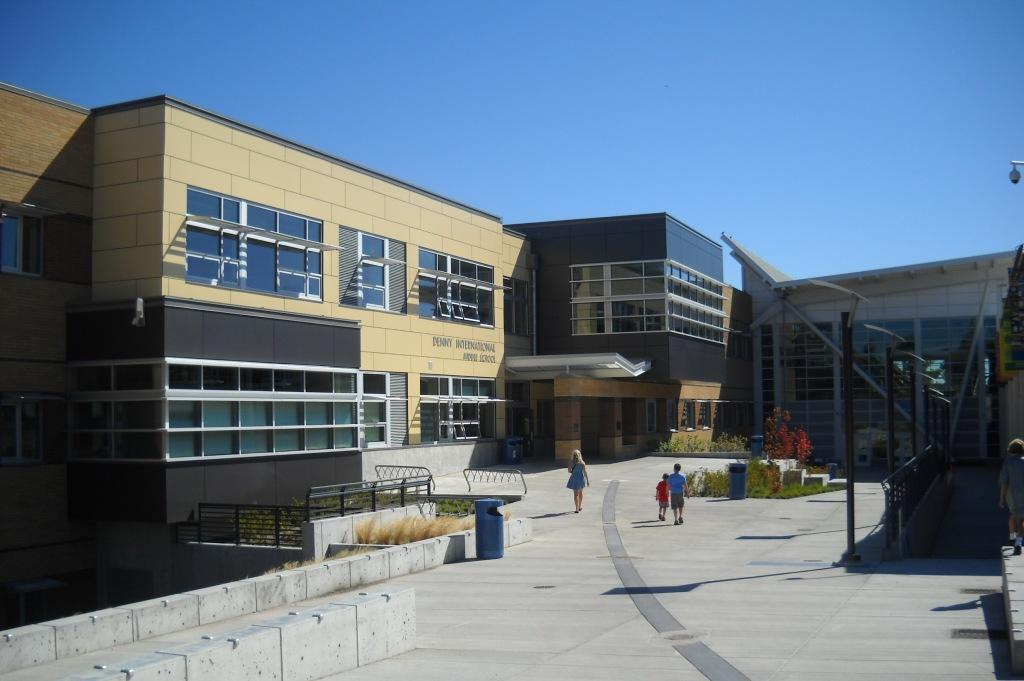
Denny International Middle School

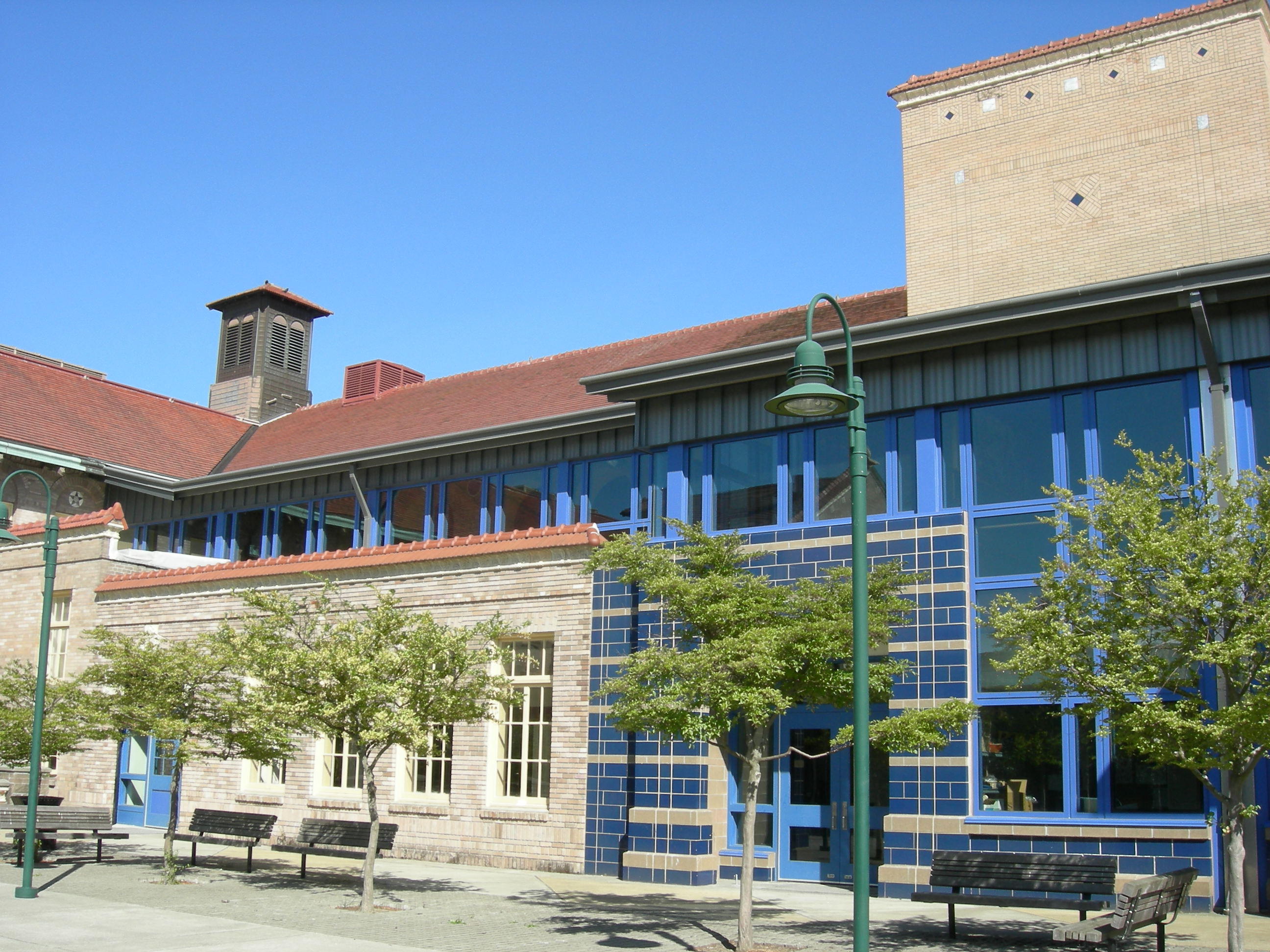
West Seattle High School

Elementary Schools, Grades K–5

- B.F. Day
- Graham Hill
- John Stanford International

Middle Schools, Grades 6–8

- Denny International
- Eckstein (Self-Contained Spectrum Program Offered)
- Aki Kurose

High Schools, Grades 9–12

- Ballard
- The Center School
- Chief Sealth Int'l
- Cleveland
- Franklin
- Garfield (Highly Capable Pathway)
- Nathan Hale
- Ingraham (Highly Capable Option Site)
- Lincoln (Highly Capable Pathway)
- Middle College
- Nova
- Rainier Beach
- Roosevelt
- South Lake
- West Seattle (Highly Capable Pathway)

== Demographics ==
As of 2023–2024, the enrollment and demographic figures for the district are:

Total students: 49,226

K-5th: 23,283
6-8th: 10,648
9th-12th: 15,295

By ethnicity:
Caucasian: 46%
Black: 14%
Asian: 12%
Hispanic: 15%
Multiracial: 13%
Native American/American Indian: 1%
Native Hawaiian/Pacific Islander: 1%

By gender:
Male: 51%
Female: 48%
Gender X: 1%

4-Year Graduation Rate: 88%

Beginning in the 2026 school year, all students at SPS schools will receive free school meals, including breakfast and lunch.
