= Stefan Gruber =

American cartoonist

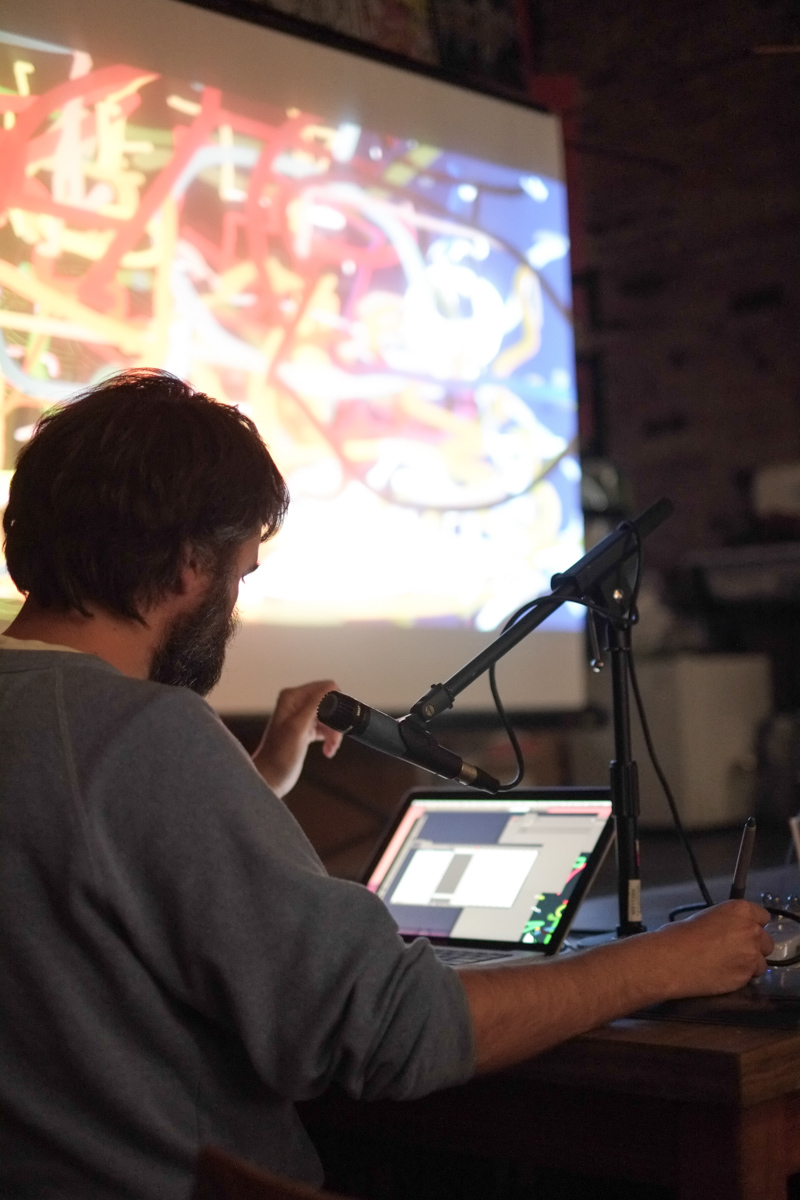
- Stefan performing at the Drawn and Quarterly shop.
- Born: Stefan William Gruber; December 8, 1975 (age 50); Seattle, Washington, US
- Other names: Stefan Gruber, Big Imagination
- Occupations: animation director, editor, colorist, experimental animator, performance artist, motion graphics artist, teacher
- Years active: 1994–present
- Notable work: Edible Rocks, Anaelle, Leashlessness, Both Worlds
- Website: Official website

Stefan Gruber (born December 8, 1975) is an American experimental animator and performance artist from Seattle, Washington. They create hand-drawn, digitally finished experimental animation shorts and are Animation Department founder and teacher at The Nova Animation Project and the founder of Seattle Experimental Animation Team (SEAT).

== Biography ==
Gruber was born into a creative environment and was exposed to animation from an early age. Raised by an inventor father and a mother involved in modern dance, Gruber is also the grandchild and partial namesake of William Gruber, inventor of the ViewMaster Stereoscopic photography technology. At the age of thirteen, they spent the summer in Portland, Oregon to study at the Saturday Academy, under the tutelage of Sharon Niemczyk. They attended high school in Seattle at The Nova Project. While at Nova, they pursued a combination of acting, electronic music (with an Ensoniq ASR10) and illustration, which would cultivate their interest in animation as performance art.

Gruber moved to Los Angeles and pursued a BFA in Experimental Animation at the California Institute of the Arts under Jules Engel. During this time, they met many of their mentors, including Christine Panushka, Maureen Selwood, Raimund Krumme, Kathy Rose and Suzan Pitt. By their graduation in 1999, Gruber had completed their first few short films, including Leashlessness and Jewels.

== Career ==
Following college, Gruber returned to Seattle to act as ambassador for the concept of Experimental Animation. In 2001, they returned to Nova High School to found their animation program and the Nova Animation Portal, an annual benefit to fund the department. Gruber continues to teach today as head of the Animation Department. Gruber is also founder of the Seattle Experimental Animation Team (SEAT), a collective of animators and filmmakers who make independent, non-commercial animated work to raise awareness surrounding the independent animation scene in Seattle.

Today, Gruber creates one hand-drawn, digitally finished experimental animation short per year and spends their summers touring North America with their work—in addition to their work with Nova and SEAT.

== Cartoons ==
=== Edible Rocks (2012) ===
Charcoal, colored pencils, gel pens. This animation recounts the time when the animator convinced their little brother that there were some rocks you could eat.

=== Both Worlds part 1 (2010) ===
Hand drawn, digitally finished animation. This animation is accompanied by a live score and improvised dialogue, so every performance is different. Both Worlds part 2 was slated for 2013. The piece features two peaceful creatures in talks with each other about how to maintain the flora and fauna on the mountains they each live on top of.

=== Petting Zoo 2 (2009) ===
Hand drawn, digitally finished animation. This animation concludes Petting Zoo's premise of liberating trapped animals as symbols of contained human emotions.

=== Petting Zoo (2008) ===
Hand drawn, digitally finished animation. The main character is either the voyeur or liberator of animals trapped in a haunted abandoned zoo.

=== Anaelle (2006) ===
Hand drawn, digitally transferred, finished as 35mm film print. This animation follows Gruber's account of a magical encounter involving resurrecting drowned ladybugs.

=== Fantasy Pleasure Complex (2001–2010) ===
This project is the collective title of a collection of short digital animation experiments by Stefan and guests and updated bi-yearly.

=== Thought City (2000) ===
Hand drawn punched paper animated film shot on Oxberry 16mm. Armies of commuters go about their routine, abstract and near-nonsensical business, within an ever-shifting cement block world. Occasionally, they get literally consumed by their own news, and they wage war against small, not entirely defenseless birds.

=== Leashlessness (1999) ===
Hand drawn flipbook animated film shot on Oxberry 16mm. In this animated clip, two dogs go into sensory overload, and it's up to a good Samaritan to liberate the four-legged friends from their oppressive leash-holders.

== Comics ==
=== Scentagons (2021) ===
16-page, full color comic published by Neoglyphic Media. The story revolves around the intrusion of empty bottle-headed beings into a pantheon of deities, aliens, cryptids, and animal characters recurring in Gruber's work.

=== Viking Eggling (2008) ===
This twelve-page, full color comic is part of the SOS comic anthology. In this comic, a Birdman rises up in ranks in some unusual outer space jobs.

=== Duck Lessons (2003) ===
Twelve-page mini comic about a person trying to get wisdom from a duck who never talks to him.

=== Kometes (2002) ===
Twelve-page mini comic about two people trying to start a radical garden.

=== Some Sonic Nurturing in Washington's Mystic Bayou (2001) ===
In this ten-page full color comic in the anthology Kramers Ergot #4, two mountainside dwellers find inspiration for new musical styles based on their encounter with Jake the Alligator Man.

=== Gain Way (2000) ===
This story consists of several one-page stories in Kramers Ergot #3

== Performance Art ==
=== Lead Bunny (2012) ===
Evaporation animation technique was invented for this show, and dancers modeled their movements to be sampled into a 5-minute piece that accompanied the live modern dance performance at Hedreen Gallery in 2012.

=== Psychic Portraiture (2009) ===
The purpose of this performance is to create and perform a show in which the artist paints portraits of audience members with animated light on a stage arranged with a large-sized canvas. Symbols from the life of the model materialize to decorate the portrait. In banter with the model and audience, psychic details are intuited.

=== Real Time Comic (2008–2010) ===
This project was started to navigate a way of improvising with animation in the company of musicians and dancers. Three shows, at OKOK, Velocity, and On the Boards were staged. Ongoing.

=== Cuckoo Crow (2006) ===
This was a sold-out show at the Moore Theatre featured experimental performers Degenerate Art Ensemble with several animations projected onto experimental screens, such as an animated caged bird on the underside of a dress, slot machine animations on an ice cream truck, and 4 foot tall egg shapes that slowly dropped from the three-story tall rigging, filled with the movements of animated birds.

=== Relatively Real (2005) ===
On the Boards featured Lingo Dance Co and Gruber's animation projected onto mobile, wheeled 'sails' which could be arranged live by the dancers to form several sets. Abstract animations based on the dancer's movements were created alongside the practice times leading up to the performance.

=== Slide Rule (2003–2010) ===
Slide Rule Digital Players hosts a community of comic makers who want their comics to be experienced as performance. Gruber and fellow comic makers built PowerPoint presentations with live dialogue and scores. Adaptations include versions of the mini comics Duck Lessons, Viking Eggling, Kometes and many more.

== Other endeavors ==
In the mid-nineties, Gruber was involved in a band called Soapy Grapes, which consisted of high school friend Rosten Woo and Gruber's then seven-year-old cousin, Hannah Burney. Gruber maintains the music on their site.

In 2010, Gruber drew six different 102-page tape bound hand assembled Flipbooks. They continue to sell these at their performances and showcases.

In the summer of 2012, Gruber painted Both Worlds, a triptych mural installation in Seattle's Cal Anderson Park, painted for the Sound Transit Art Program (STart). According to the STart blog, the "wall is meant to be a cartoon place where characters from Stefan's previous films can go to relax."

== Inventions ==
Stefan Gruber's Hexagonal Chess is partially an answer to Douglas Hofstadter's challenge to translate traditional square lattice chess into a hexagonal lattice version, which Hoffstadter calls, "chesh." Gruber completed the preliminary list of rules in 1993 and created an animated accompaniment to explain the game. A group meets regularly in Seattle to playtest the game.

Gruber invented 3 Way Soccer at The Nova Project in 2005. The game is an unorthodox sports workshop with continuously evolving rules, only loosely resembling soccer. Each game is one hour in length, during which the first forty minutes, the ball is in play, and the remaining twenty minutes are used to decide how the rules of the game should change for the next game. In each game, three teams are formed on a circular field, and a large yoga ball is used instead of a soccer ball. The interactions of three opposing teams creates what Gruber describes as a "dance-related trajectory".

== Awards ==
- Semi-finalist: Creative Capitol (2012)
- Featured artist in Creative Capitol's On Our Radar (2012)
- The Mayor's Office of Arts and Cultural Affairs (2011)
- Artist Trust Fellowship (2007)
- Finalist: Stranger Genius Awards (2006)
- Seattle Arts Commission (1999)
- The Princess Grace Foundation (1998)
- Finalist: Student Academy Awards (1998)
- GAP (Multiple)
- 4Culture (Multiple)
