= Seattle school boycott of 1966 =

Protest against racial segregation

The Seattle school boycott of 1966 was a protest against racial segregation in the Seattle Public Schools. On March 31 and April 1, thousands of students left classes at their public schools, with the large majority of them attending community Freedom Schools instead.

== History ==
Parents, civil-rights groups, and community organizations had spent years pushing the city to improve the public education system and make Seattle schools equitable for all children. They challenged the structure that concentrated children of color disproportionately in a few under-funded schools and demanded that the district improve the quality of these schools. However, they were unable to persuade the majority-white school board to deal with the issue.

After years of frustration with city officials, a coalition of organizations led by the Central Area Civil Rights Committee (CACRC), the Congress of Racial Equality (CORE), and the National Association for the Advancement of Colored People (NAACP) organized a boycott, requesting that all Seattle parents keep their children out of school for two days.

Organizers saw the need for alternative education programs during the boycott to provide childcare for working parents and model multicultural education for the students. They decided to call these sites "Freedom Schools" to connect the local boycott to the national struggle for racial justice.

Eight Freedom Schools were originally planned, but on the morning of March 31, so many students walked out of school that many new Freedom School sites had to be set up. Some parents stayed when they came to drop their children off because the sites were so crowded. Freedom Schools were held at: First A.M.E. Church, Madrona Presbyterian Church, Goodwill Baptist Church, East Madison YMCA, Cherry Hill Baptist Church, Tabernacle Baptist Church, Mt. Zion Baptist Church, Woodland Park Presbyterian Church and the East Side YMCA.

The curriculum of the Seattle Freedom Schools included subjects that were not taught in Seattle Public Schools. There was an emphasis on teaching African American history and the history of the civil-rights movement. Freedom Schools also provided "leadership training [for youth to become] a new generation of civil rights leaders," said Dr. Earl Miller, a Seattle organizer with the NAACP and CORE.

Hundreds of volunteers served as teachers, doctors on call, outreach workers, transportation directors, childcare assistants, and resource people. The total number of students who walked out is estimated at 4,000. Organizers estimated that 3,000 of them participated in Freedom Schools. The school district absentee rate rose 58.5% over the two days. According to the chairman of the Boycott Committee, about 70% of the students attending Freedom Schools were people of color, predominantly African American, while approximately 30% were white. Though the school district attributed the absences to the upcoming spring vacation, organizers of the boycott considered it a huge success

Some participants criticized what they saw as token support from white families who participated in the Freedom Schools. Other people were disillusioned by a lack of long-term results as the Seattle Public School district continued to perpetuate racism and inequity. Regardless, the Seattle Freedom School campaign of 1966 is part of a history of racial-justice organizing which gives strength and guidance to the people who continue to work for racial equity.

== See also ==
- Chicago Public Schools boycott of 1963
- New York City school boycott of 1964
