= Ben Shuldiner =

Educator (born 1977)

- Born: April 19, 1977 (age 49); New York, NY
- Education: Harvard College; Baruch College
- Occupation: Superintendent of Seattle Public Schools

Ben Shuldiner (born April 19, 1977) is an American educator who has served as the superintendent of Seattle Public Schools since February 2026. He previously led the Lansing School District in Michigan from 2021-2026. Shuldiner was President of the Association for Supervision and Curriculum Development from 2017-18. He was appointed to the New York City Board of Education in 2015.

== Early life and education ==
Shuldiner, who is Jewish, was raised in New York City, though his family moved considerably when he was a child due to his father, Joseph Shuldiner's involvement in the movement to improve public housing (Joseph Shuldiner eventually became an undersecretary of housing in the Clinton Administration).

Ben Shuldiner attended Harvard University as an undergraduate and was involved in labor activism. He was selected to join the inaugural class of the AFL–CIO's Union Summer, where he worked organizing day care workers in urban Chicago. On campus, he co-founded Harvard's Progressive Student Labor Movement to fight for living wages for university employees and also served as a sports writer for The Harvard Crimson. In addition to his primary study of history of science, he took graduate-level education courses to earn his teaching credentials and graduated with a bachelor's degree in history and science magna cum laude in 1999. He holds a Master of Science in Education from Baruch College.

== Foundation of High School for Public Service (HSPS) ==
In 2002, Shuldiner and co-founder Marisa Boan received a grant from the Bill and Melinda Gates Foundation to build a high school that better reflected their vision of a fair public education system, and the High School for Public Service: Heroes of Tomorrow opened on the George W. Wingate High School campus in Crown Heights, Brooklyn in the fall of 2003. The school was founded as one of eight New Visions schools opened in Brooklyn that year in an effort to replace failing high schools with smaller, more successful ones. When the school opened, Shuldiner became the youngest public high school principal in the history of the state of New York. The school enjoyed rapid success and today boasts extraordinary passing rates on the Regents Exams, a 98% graduation rate in 2010, and a unique on-campus urban farm program.

== Political campaign ==
Shuldiner was one of four Democratic candidates in the 2006 election to defeat incumbent Republican Sue Kelly for New York's 19th congressional district. His campaign was focused on ending No Child Left Behind and creating a single payer national health care program. Shuldiner lost the nomination to fellow Democrat John Hall, who went on to beat Kelly in a close election.

== Awards and honors ==
A lifelong hemophiliac, he was selected as the keynote speaker for the 2003 annual conference of the National Hemophilia Foundation. In 2005, he was chosen from a nationwide pool as the recipient of the prestigious Jefferson Awards for Public Service, "Greatest Public Service by an Individual 35 Years or Under." In 2011, he was an Honoree in the Outstanding Young Educator program by ASCD.
