= Alan T. Sugiyama High School =

Coordinates: 47.5257°N 122.2709°W

Alan T. Sugiyama High School at South Lake

Location
- 8601 Rainier Ave S Seattle, Washington 98118; United States

Information
- Type: Public
- Motto: "A family that believes, inspires and empowers voice and choice."
- Established: 1981
- Principal: Joe Powell
- Faculty: 20-30
- Grades: 9–12
- Enrollment: 31 (2022-23)
- Mascot: Blue Sharks
- Website: Alan T. Sugiyama High School at South Lake

Alan T. Sugiyama High School at South Lake (ATS) is a high school in Seattle with an arts and entertainment focus.

== History ==
Opened as Sharples Alternative Secondary School in 1981, after the closing of Sharples Junior High School, the school operated in the Casper W. Sharples Junior High School Building until 1988, when Franklin students used the building while their school was renovated. The Alternative Secondary School moved to Washington Institute for Applied Technology (the former Seattle Opportunities Industrialization Center Building) at 22nd Avenue and Jackson Street. The program returned to the Casper W. Sharples Junior High School Building in the fall of 1990.

In the fall of 1999, the South Shore Middle School moved into the Casper W. Sharples Junior High School Building, due to issues with the open floor plan of the South Shore Middle School Building. With this change, the Sharples Alternative Secondary School moved into the South Shore Middle School Building, and was renamed South Lake High School, and it shared the building with a number of programs.

In the fall of 2008, South Lake High School moved to a new building, where they currently operate.

In May 2020, the school was again renamed to Alan T. Sugiyama High School At South Lake, in recognition of Alan Tsutomu Sugiyama, who was the first Asian American elected to the Seattle School Board in 1989.

== Facilities ==
In 2005, the Seattle School Board voted 6-1 to approve construction of a new facility for South Lake High School, with construction planning to begin in July 2007. In the Fall of 2008, South Lake High School opened their new building, where they currently operate.

== Awards and recognitions ==
In 2014, the principal of South Lake High School, Barbara Moore, won the Thomas B. Foster Award for Excellence, an award recognizing outstanding secondary school principals in Seattle. This award was also accompanied with a $50,000 cash grant for the high school.
