= Aki Kurose Middle School Academy =

Aki Kurose Middle School
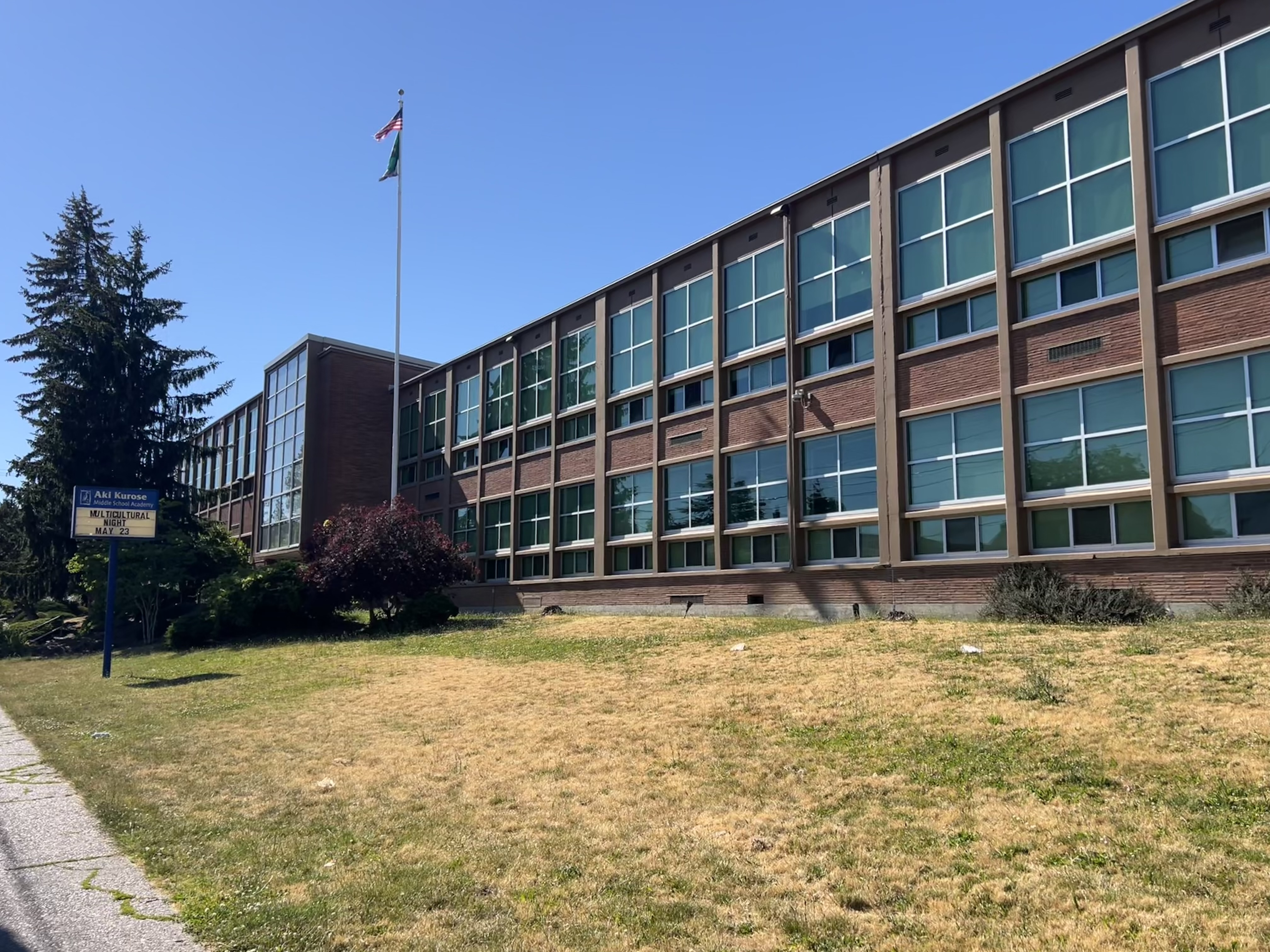

Location
- 3928 S Graham Street; Seattle, Washington 98118; United States; 47°32′46″N 122°16′57″W

Information
- School type: Public, Middle School
- Opened: 1952
- Status: Open
- School district: Seattle Public Schools
- Principal: Daniel Reeve
- Grades: 6-8
- Gender: Coed
  - Grade 6: 232
  - Grade 7: 252
  - Grade 8: 264
- Language: English
- Colors: Blue and Gold
- Mascot: Peace Cranes
- Feeder to: Rainier Beach High School
- Website: kurosems.seattleschools.org

Aki Kurose Middle School is a public secondary school in Seattle, Washington, part of the Seattle Public Schools. Located in the Rainier Valley in southeast Seattle, it serves students in grades 6-8. The school is one of the most racially diverse schools in Seattle, with 97% of its student body being of color. A high proportion of its students are also recent immigrants, and 42% of the students are non-English speakers. The school emphasizes development of relationships between the community and the school, and establishing respect between students and teachers.

== Aki Kurose ==
Aki Kurose was a teacher who inspired many by advocating for peace. She taught in the Seattle Public Schools for 25 years, and helped bring Head Start programs to Seattle schools. Mrs. Kurose would often care for students who needed food or shelter or other kinds of help. She died in 1998. Aki Kurose Middle School was the first Seattle public school to be named after a teacher.

== History ==
Aki Kurose is a relatively new middle school in an old building. It first opened as Caspar W. Sharples Junior High School in 1952. The nearby South Shore Middle School opened in 1973, but afterward enrollment at both schools declined. In 1981 the district closed Sharples and re-opened it as Sharples Alternative Secondary School, to accommodate students who were behind in credits. The middle school students moved to South Shore. The site subsequently added a reentry program for students who had dropped out or been suspended, the Project Transition vocational program serving students with disabilities, the Teenage Parent Program, the Secondary Bilingual Orientation Center, and Samoan Integration Services. The programs were temporarily displaced from 1988–1990 to accommodate students from Franklin High School during its renovation.

In 1999, the alternative program moved to the South Shore building and became South Lake Alternative High School. South Shore's middle school students moved to the Sharples building, which was renamed Aki Kurose Middle School that November.

== Demographics ==
Of all Seattle's middle schools, Aki Kurose has the highest percentage of non-white students at 97.2%. African American students are 42.2% of the total, Asian Americans 41.1%, and Hispanics 11.8%. Whites and Native Americans account for less than 3% each. 42.4% of students are non-English speakers and 18.3% are bilingual. Aki Kurose houses the school district's Bilingual Family Center, an office that helps students and their families whose home language is not English. On June 22, 2010, the Bilingual Family Center will move to the SPS headquarters building.

== Academic programs ==
English as a second language is taught at the school. Spanish is taught as a foreign language.

Spectrum students study at about one year above their grade level. The school also offers a rigorous honors program in all grade levels. Honors classes are offered in Language Arts, Reading and Math.

Many students from Aki Kurose attend Rainier Beach High School or Franklin High School, which are nearby.

== Special Needs ==
Aki Kurose Middle School offers special education services to about 100 of its students. They have 6 classes that offer modified curriculum, services for autistic students and/of self-containment for students with emotional/behavior disabilities. In the self-contained special education program, students stay together in one class most of the day and receive individual help.

== Academic Performance ==
Aki Kurose lags behind the Seattle Public Schools and Washington State averages in WASL testing. In 2008, 50.3% of 8th graders passed Reading, 51.5% passed Math and 47.9% passed Science. 22.7% of students who were tested passed all three subjects. From 2005 to 2008, pass rates rose by an average of 2% to 5%. The school has failed to make Adequate Yearly Progress as defined by the federal No Child Left Behind Act for every student category in Math, and every category in Reading except Asian/Pacific Islanders and Hispanics.

== Creative Arts ==
The school offers classes in drawing and painting, journalism/yearbook. There are drama and band/orchestra, guitar, and choir music classes. Manufacturing technology students work with wood, metal, plastics and robotics. The City of Seattle Parks and Recreation department oversees the after school activities for the school offering extracurricular activities like hip-hop dance, drumline, cooking, gardening and art.

== Sports ==
Aki Kurose offers boys basketball and soccer, and girls volleyball, soccer and basketball. Students also can compete in co-ed activities like track and Ultimate Frisbee.

== Safety ==
In June 2008, a class aide was charged with third degree child molestation. In June 2007, a girl reported being sexually assaulted in a school bathroom.

According to Aki Kurose's 2009 annual report, student suspensions were more than four times the district average in 2006–07, when approximately 25% of students were suspended. In 2008–09, suspensions were more than three times the district average and approximately 20% of students were suspended.

== Partnerships ==
Aki Kurose Middle School has partnerships with Diplomas Now, Communities In Schools, City Year, TreeHouse and the City of Seattle. Through their partnerships with Diplomas Now they were participants of the "Be Here, Get There" attendance challenge during the 2012–13. The attendance at the school rose to 95%, which allowed R&B singer/songwriter Ne-Yo to be principal for a day during the 2012–13 school year. Aki Kurose Middle School won the Communities In School-School of Excellence award in 2013. They also won the Diplomas Now Road Map Project school award in 2014. They have also had visits from Seattle Seahawks players, including Marshawn Lynch during the 2014–15 school year. They were also awarded the School of Excellence award
