= Mount Morris Township, Illinois =

Coordinates: 42°03′07″N 89°26′32″W

Mount Morris Township
- Township
- Location in Ogle County.
- Country: United States
- State: Illinois
- County: Ogle

Government
  - Supervisor: J William Murray

Area
  - Total: 36.14 sq mi (93.6 km^{2})
  - Land: 36.14 sq mi (93.6 km^{2})
  - Water: 0 sq mi (0 km^{2}) 0%

Population (2010)
  - Estimate (2016): 3,771
  - Density: 109.8/sq mi (42.4/km^{2})
- Time zone: UTC-6 (CST)
  - Summer (DST): UTC-5 (CDT)
- FIPS code: 17-141-51011
- Website: http://www.toi.org/MOUNTMORRISTOWNSHIP/

Mount Morris Township is located in Ogle County, Illinois. As of the 2010 census, its population was 3,968 and it contained 1,858 housing units.

== Geography ==
According to the 2010 census, the township has a total area of 36.14 square miles (93.6 km^{2}), all land.

== Demographics ==
Historical population
Census	Pop.	Note	%±
2016 (est.)	3,771
U.S. Decennial Census
