= Middle College High School (Seattle) =

High school in Seattle, Washington

Coordinates: 47.5448°N 122.3722°W

Middle College High School is a high school in Seattle, Washington. Established on January 30, 1990, the main goal of Middle College High School is to give underserved and underrepresented students a second chance at earning their high school diploma. Beginning their junior year, all students at Middle College High School begin taking college classes through Washington State's Running Start program.

== Location ==
Middle College High School has two campuses, one at North Seattle College in Northgate and another at Seattle Central College, once the site of Seattle's first high school.

=== Former Locations ===
- Middle College at American Indian Heritage – 1330 N. 90th St.
- High Point School for Social Justice
- Middle College at High Point Center – 6400 Sylvan Way S.W.
- Northgate Mall Academy – 401 N.E. Northgate Way
- Middle College at Seattle University – As of September 2012, temporarily located at the American Indian Heritage center. Slated to move to Seattle University in autumn 2012.
- Ida B. Wells School for Social Justice at University of Washington
