= Project Lead the Way =

Non-profit education organization in the US

- Abbreviation: PLTW
- Founded: June 1997; 28 years ago
- Type: Educational
- Headquarters: 5939 Castle Crk Pkwy Dr N, Indianapolis, IN 46250, U.S.
- Region served: United States
- President & CEO: David Dimmett
- Staff: 200+
- Website: pltw.org

Project Lead The Way (PLTW) is an American nonprofit organization that develops STEM curriculum for use by US elementary, middle, and high schools.

== Description ==
PLTW provides curriculum and training to teachers and administrators to implement the curriculum. The curriculum is project-based. Three levels of curriculum are used for elementary, middle, and high-school levels. PLTW Launch is the elementary school level, designed for preschool through fifth grade. The curriculum consists of 28 modules (four per grade) that touch on a variety of science and technology topics. PLTW Gateway is the middle school level, covering grades six through eight. It consists of 10 different modules, which can be taught in any order, so schools can organize the modules into courses as best fits their own schedules. At the high school level (grades 9–12), three different programs are offered, each with a four-course sequence. The three high-school pathways are computer science, engineering, and biomedical science. Within each high school pathway are four or more courses designed to be taken in a certain order - an introductory course, two or more middle-level courses that can be taken in any order, and then a capstone course for the final high-school year.

=== High school courses ===
The program offers the following courses at high school level:

==== PLTW Engineering ====
- Engineering Essentials
- Introduction to Engineering Design
- Principles of Engineering
- Aerospace Engineering
- Civil Engineering and Architecture
- Computer Integrated Manufacturing
- Computer Science Principles
- Digital Electronics
- Environmental Sustainability
- Engineering Design and Development / PLTW Capstone

==== PLTW Computer Science ====
- Computer Science Essentials
- Computer Science Principles (in collaboration with AP/CollegeBoard)
- Computer Science A
- Cybersecurity
- PLTW Capstone

==== PLTW Biomedical Science ====
- Principles of Biomedical Science
- Human Body Systems
- Medical Interventions
- Biomedical Innovation
- PLTW Capstone

== AP + PLTW ==
In 2015, College Board partnered with Project Lead The Way in an effort to encourage STEM majors. Students who have successfully passed at least three exams (one AP exam, one PLTW exam, and another AP or PLTW exam) are eligible to receive the AP + PLTW Student Recognition for one or more of the following: engineering, biomedical sciences, and computer science.

== Payment and distribution ==
Schools that register with PLTW pay a flat participation fee that includes the curriculum, all required course software, access to school and technical support, and access to PLTW's learning-management system. Teachers who instruct the PLTW curriculum are required to take part in PLTW's three-phase professional development program.

== Financial support for PLTW ==
Governments of several states, including New York, Indiana, Iowa, and South Carolina, have provided funding to PLTW to support future development.

The Kern Family Foundation of Wisconsin provides financial support for the program in Wisconsin, Illinois, Iowa, and Minnesota. Kern first became involved with PLTW in Wisconsin in 2004 as one of several programs it funds in an attempt to enhance U.S. economic competitiveness by trying to qualify more students for engineering and technology careers. The foundation's expenditures in support of the funding of PLTW total more than $23 million. Other foundations funding PLTW include the Ewing Marion Kauffman Foundation, the John S. and James L. Knight Foundation, and the Conrad Foundation.
