= Campus of the University of Washington =

College campus in Seattle, Washington, US

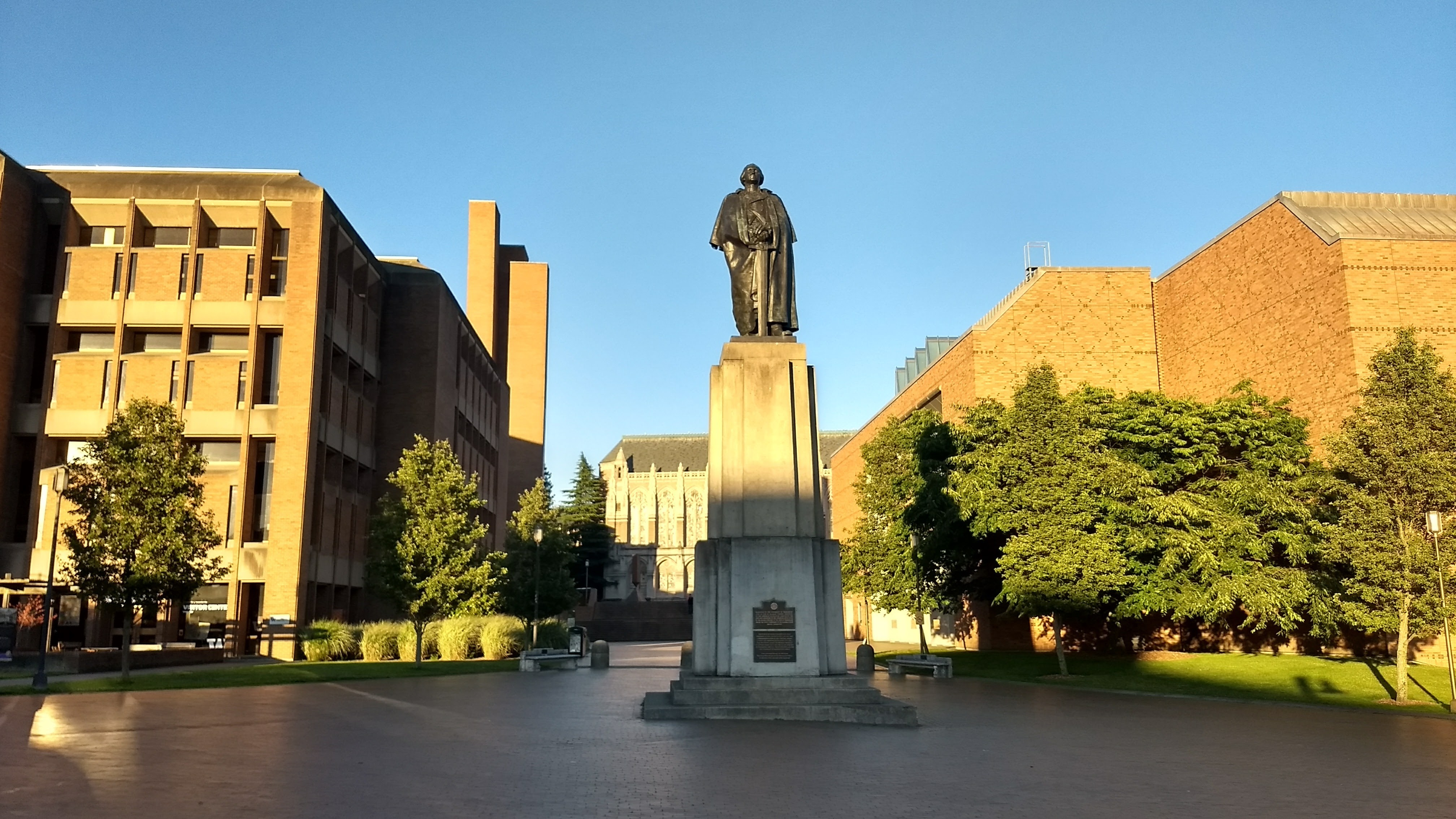
The statue of George Washington greets students entering Red Square.

The Campus of the University of Washington is located in the University District of Seattle. Campus buildings are categorized by the major street or vicinity on which they are located on campus. In 2011, Slate magazine and Travel + Leisure described the Seattle campus as one of the most beautiful university campuses in the United States.

== History ==
The University of Washington, Seattle campus is situated on the shores of Union and Portage Bays, with views of the Cascade Range to the east and the Olympic Mountains to the west. The main campus is bounded on the west by 15th Avenue N.E., on the north by N.E. 45th Street, on the east by Montlake Boulevard N.E., and on the south by N.E. Pacific Street. East Campus stretches east of Montlake Boulevard to Laurelhurst and is largely taken up by wetlands and sports fields. South Campus occupies the land between Pacific Street and the Lake Washington Ship Canal which used to be a golf course and is given over to the health sciences, oceanography, fisheries, and the University of Washington Medical Center. West Campus is less of a separate entity than the others, many of its facilities being on city streets, and stretches between 15th Avenue and Interstate 5 from the Ship Canal to N.E. 41st Street. University Way, known locally as "The Ave", lies nearby and is a focus for much student life at the university.

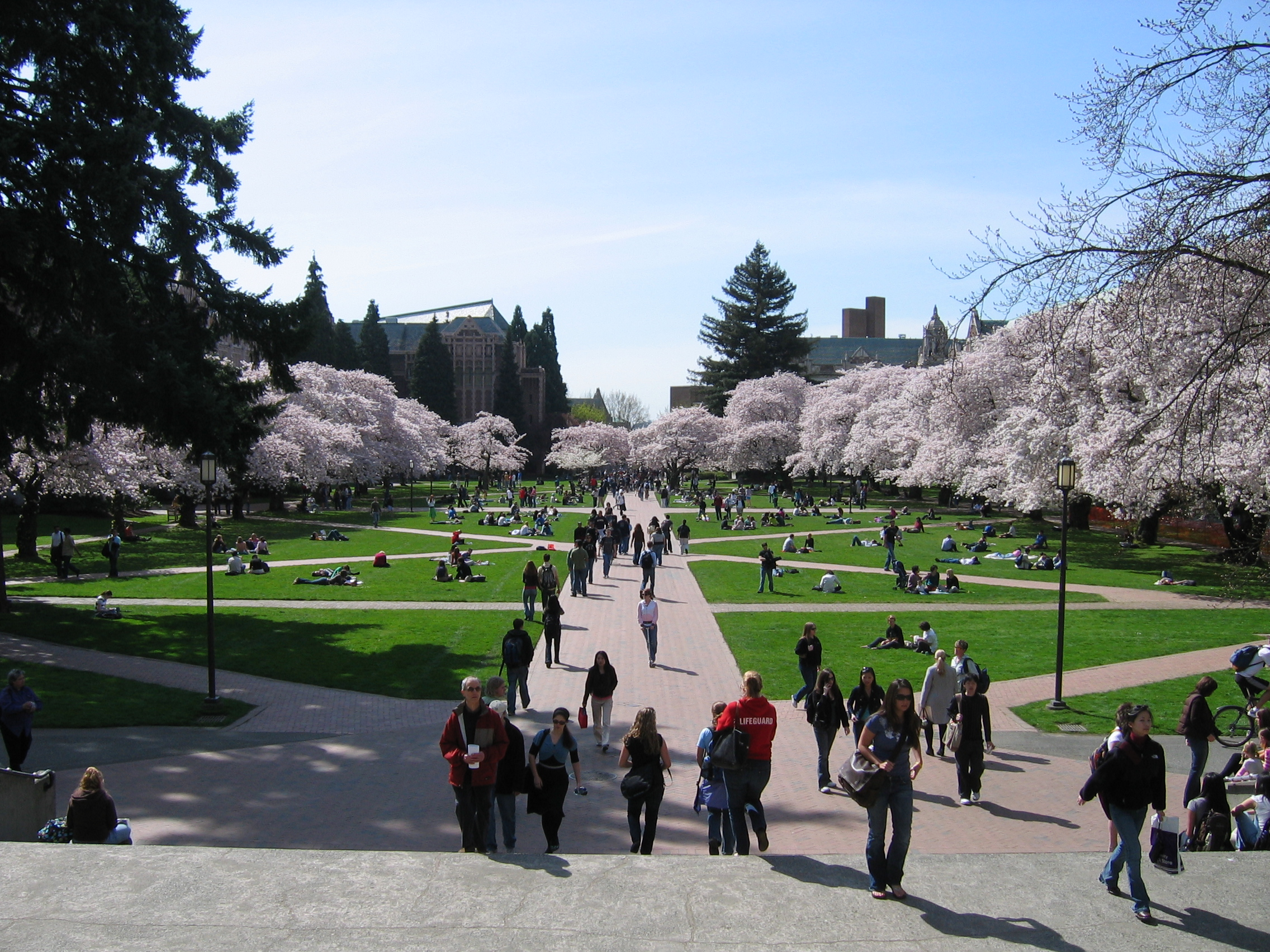
Cherry trees in bloom in the Quad

The oldest building on campus is Denny Hall. Built of Tenino sandstone in 1895 and named in honor of Seattle pioneers Arthur A. and Mary Denny. It served as the core of the university for many years. The Theodor Jacobsen Observatory, the on campus observatory situated just north of Denny Hall, was built from the left over sandstone used in the construction of Denny Hall. Although it is rarely used today, the observatory is the second oldest building on campus. After other structures were erected near Denny Hall with apparently little overall planning, the Board of Regents determined that a master plan was needed. Early plans, including a preliminary proposal by John Charles Olmsted, stepson of renowned landscape architect Frederick Law Olmsted, had little impact.

Instead, it was the Alaska–Yukon–Pacific Exposition that defined much of the campus's future layout. The exposition plan, also designed by John C. Olmsted, defined the university's major axis on the lower campus. Oriented to the southeast, it follows the East Asian concept of shakkei or borrowed scenery, providing the university with its primary vista of Mount Rainier on clear days. Most of the university's science and engineering buildings line this axis.

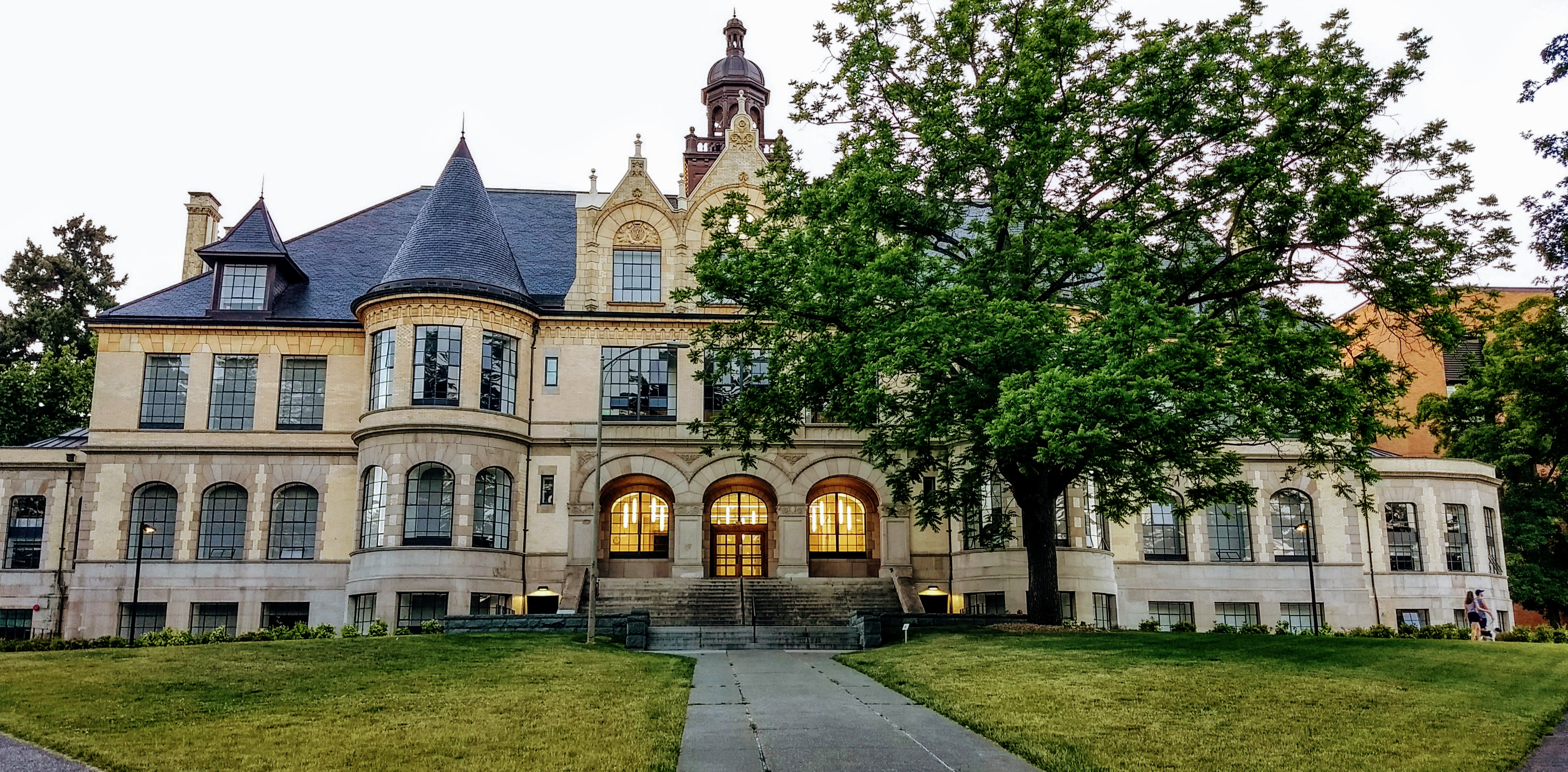
Denny Hall

After the exposition, the Board of Regents sought a master plan that would unite the newly developed lower campus with the original buildings of the upper campus including Denny Hall. Rejecting a further proposal from Olmsted, the regents instead turned to local architects Carl F. Gould and Charles H. Bebb. Their proposal was accepted, and came to be called the Regents' Plan. It specified a northeast–southwest axis on upper campus around which would be centered the university's liberal arts departments. This axis joins the lower campus axis laid down during the Alaska-Yukon-Pacific Exposition at an open space left behind after a large temporary structure built for the fair was torn down. This space was later paved with a distinctive red brick and has come to be known as Red Square. Some of the buildings from the exposition were kept by the university and have been retrofitted over the years since. One of these is Architecture Hall.

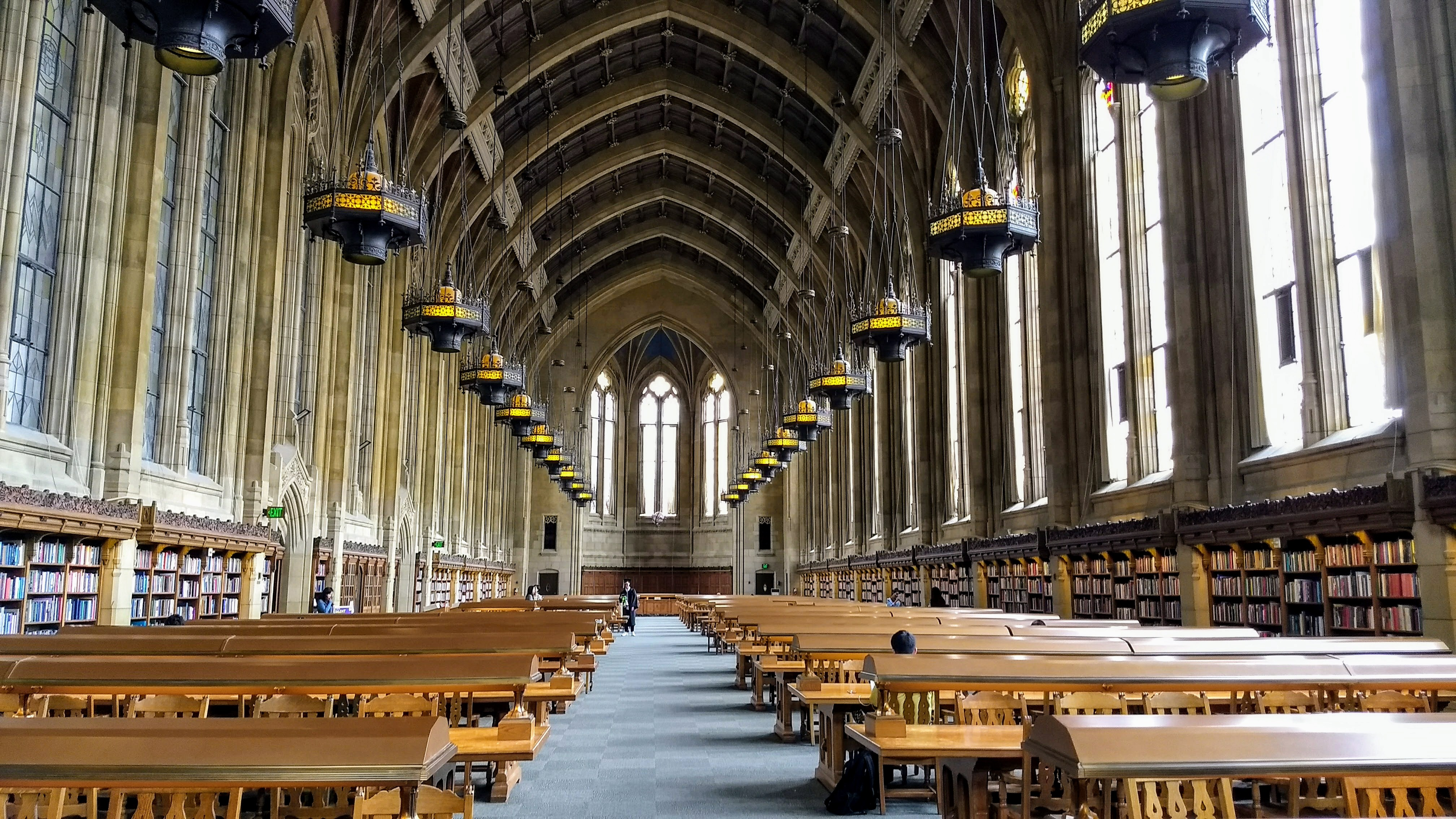
Suzzallo Library Reading Room

Bebb and Gould's plan also called for all future construction to adhere to a Collegiate Gothic style. This style is best exemplified on the university campus by the early wings of Suzzallo Library, the university's central library.

New construction in the 1960s saw a deviation from the Collegiate Gothic style as specified in the Regents' Plan. Business facilities on the upper campus, science and engineering structures on lower campus, and a new wing of Suzzallo Library, were all built in a modernist style. A unique, glass-walled building housing an experimental nuclear reactor as also built in the style and later named the More Hall Annex. The reactor opened in 1961; a small radioactivity leak in 1972 resulted only in a temporary shutdown, but security concerns eventually led to it being decommissioned. It was deactivated in 1988, dismantled in 2006, and the building was demolished in 2016.

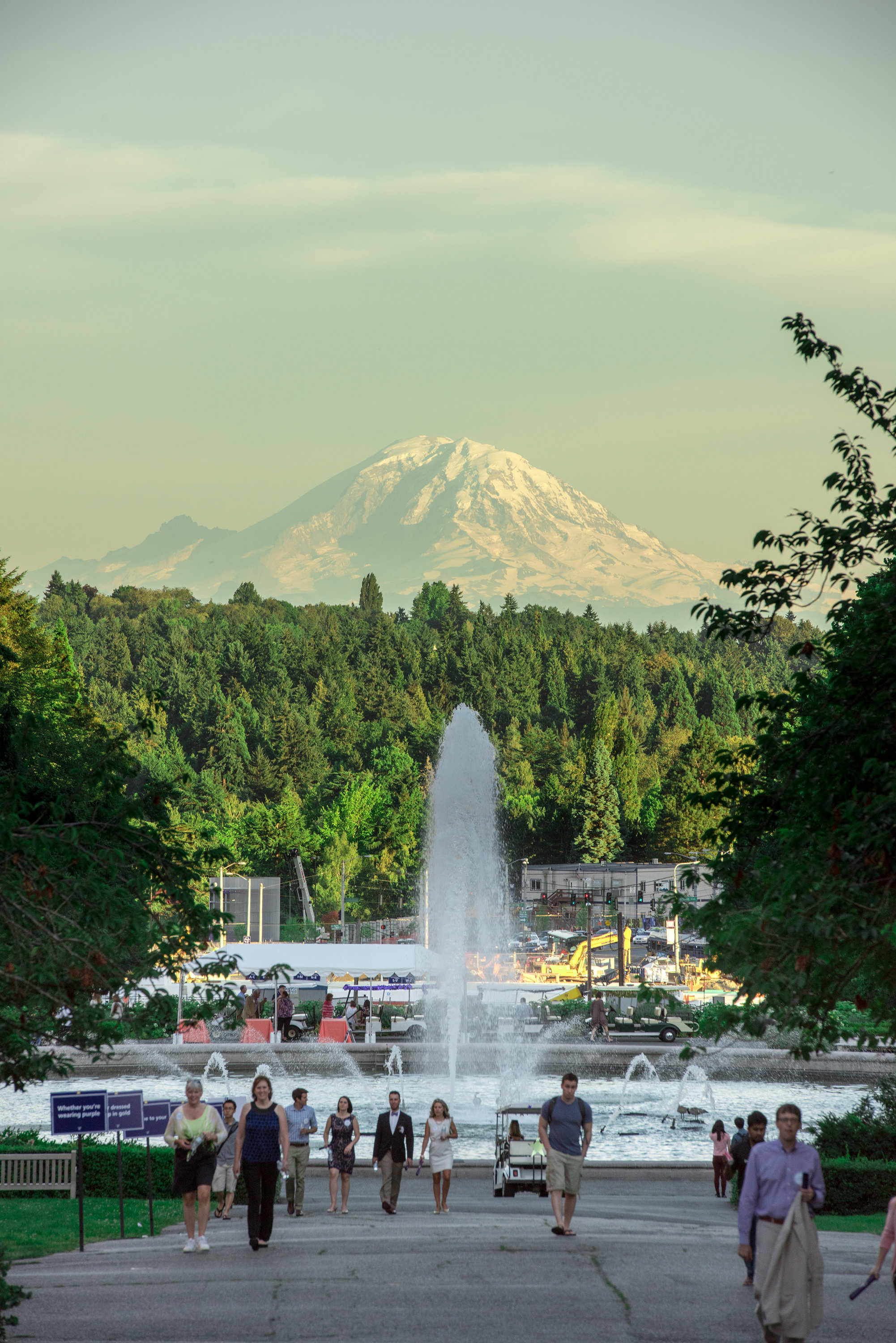
View of Mount Rainier from Drumheller Fountain

An apparent attempt to harmonize future development with the Regents' Plan can be seen in the university's most recent construction, including the 1990 Kenneth Allen wing of the central library and a new generation of medical, science and engineering buildings. Significant funding came from Microsoft co-founders Paul Allen and Bill Gates, who have strong family connections to the university but did not attend UW. Mary Gates Hall opened in May 2000, and in September 2003, the UW law school relocated to the $74 million William H. Gates Hall on the northwest corner of campus, and the $90 million UW Medical Center surgery pavilion opened for operation. The $72 million Paul G. Allen Center for Computer Science & Engineering opened in October 2003. In March 2006, the $150 million William H. Foege bioengineering and genome sciences building was dedicated by Bill Gates and former U.S. president Jimmy Carter.

In September 2006, then President Mark Emmert announced that the university had finalized the purchase of the neighboring 22-story Safeco Plaza (a University District landmark) as well as several adjacent buildings for the sum of $130 million. At present, plans are being finalized to relocate UW administration and support services to the complex, leaving the main campus (two blocks away) for teaching and research.

Most of the streets and major walkways on campus are named after the state's counties. Major exceptions are Memorial Way and George Washington Lane. Memorial Way is named in honor of members of the UW community who died in World War I and also features a flagpole engraved at its base with the members of the UW community who died in World War II.

Other attractions on campus include the Henry Art Gallery and the Burke Museum of Natural History and Culture. The Washington Park Arboretum, south of main campus across Union Bay, is run by the university, though owned by the city of Seattle. The Warren G. Magnuson Health Sciences Center, at 5,740,200 square feet (533,280 m^{2}), is the second largest office building in the United States.

Several major motion picture films were filmed on campus or used it as a backdrop, including The Sixth Man, WarGames, What the Bleep!?: Down the Rabbit Hole, and 21 and Over.

== Memorial Way ==
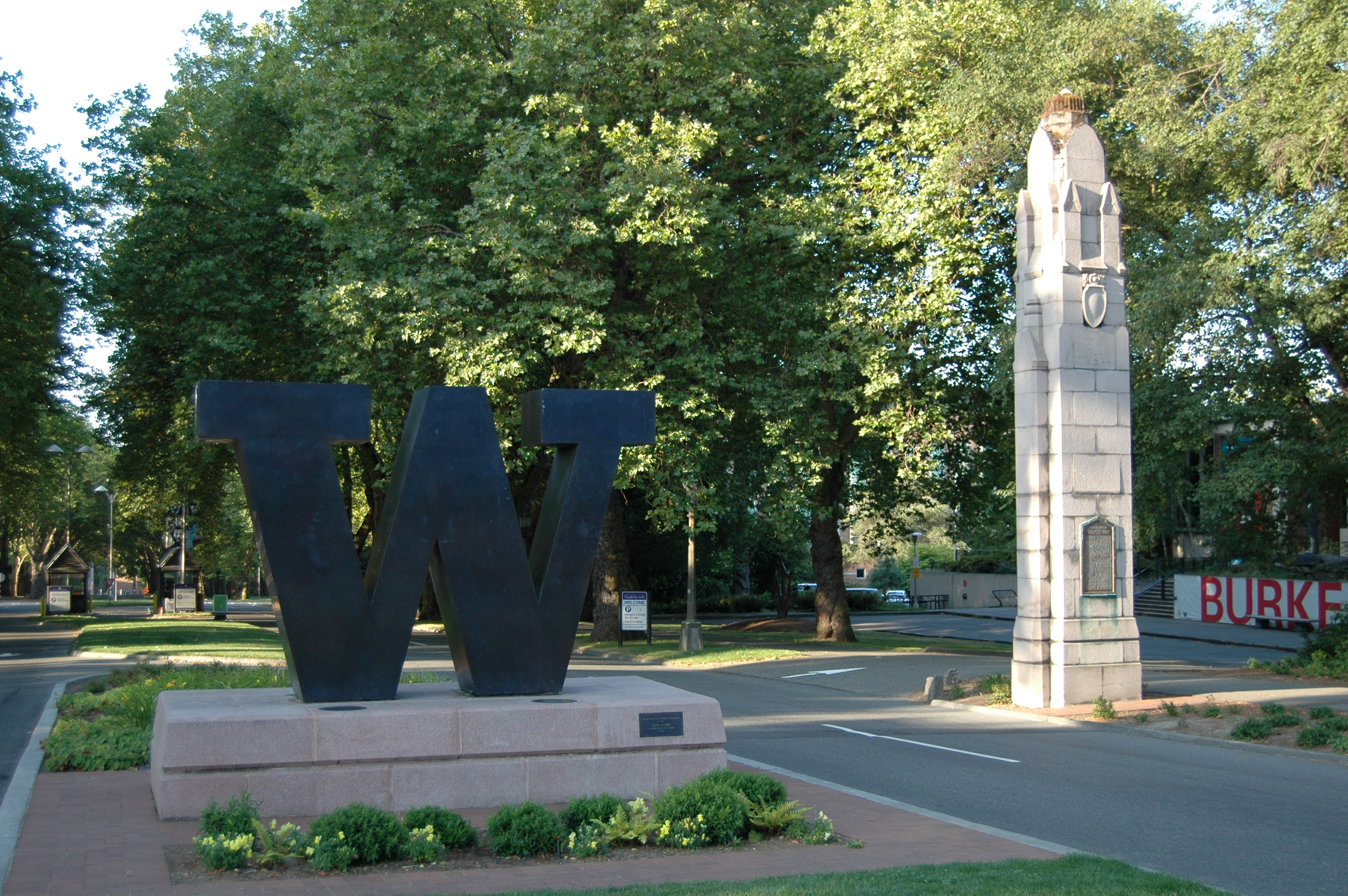
Northern entrance to the University of Washington campus

Memorial Way is the ceremonial entrance to the main campus, facing Greek Row.

- Theodor Jacobsen Observatory
- Burke Museum of Natural History and Culture
- Paccar Hall

=== William H. Gates Hall ===
William H. Gates Hall houses the University of Washington School of Law. It is located off of 15th Avenue Northeast at the northwestern corner of the University of Washington campus. William H. Gates Hall, located south of the Burke Museum of Natural History and Culture, has 196,000 square feet (18,200 m^{2}) of space. The building is named for William H. Gates, Sr., a lawyer who served as a partner of the Preston Gates & Ellis law firm. William H. Gates, Sr.'s son, William Henry "Bill" Gates III, provided most of the funding for the building. Bill Gates and his wife Melinda Gates donated $12 million to the UW School of Law. The Gates couple was the largest private donor to the William H. Gates Hall project. Gates Hall was built and constructed for $80 million. Its groundbreaking occurred on May 4, 2001, and its public opening occurred on September 12, 2003. Upon completion of the building, the school of law moved from Condon Hall to William H. Gates Hall.

=== Military memorials ===
Memorial Way is the campus memorial for students, staff, and faculty involved in World War I. At the terminus of Memorial Way is Interrupted Journey, the campus World War II memorial dedicated in 1999. A Medal of Honor Memorial is located in between the war memorials and sits at the traffic circle connecting Memorial Way and George Washington Lane. The memorial was dedicated Veterans Day 2010.

== Central Plaza ==
Central Plaza or more commonly referred to as Red Square is the intersection of the three axes that outline central campus: Memorial Way, Campus Parkway, the Quad, and Rainier Vista. Five buildings that frame Red square are named after a university presidents.

- Suzzallo Library
- Gerberding Hall
- Odegaard Undergraduate Library
- Kane Hall
- Meany Hall

== The Quad ==
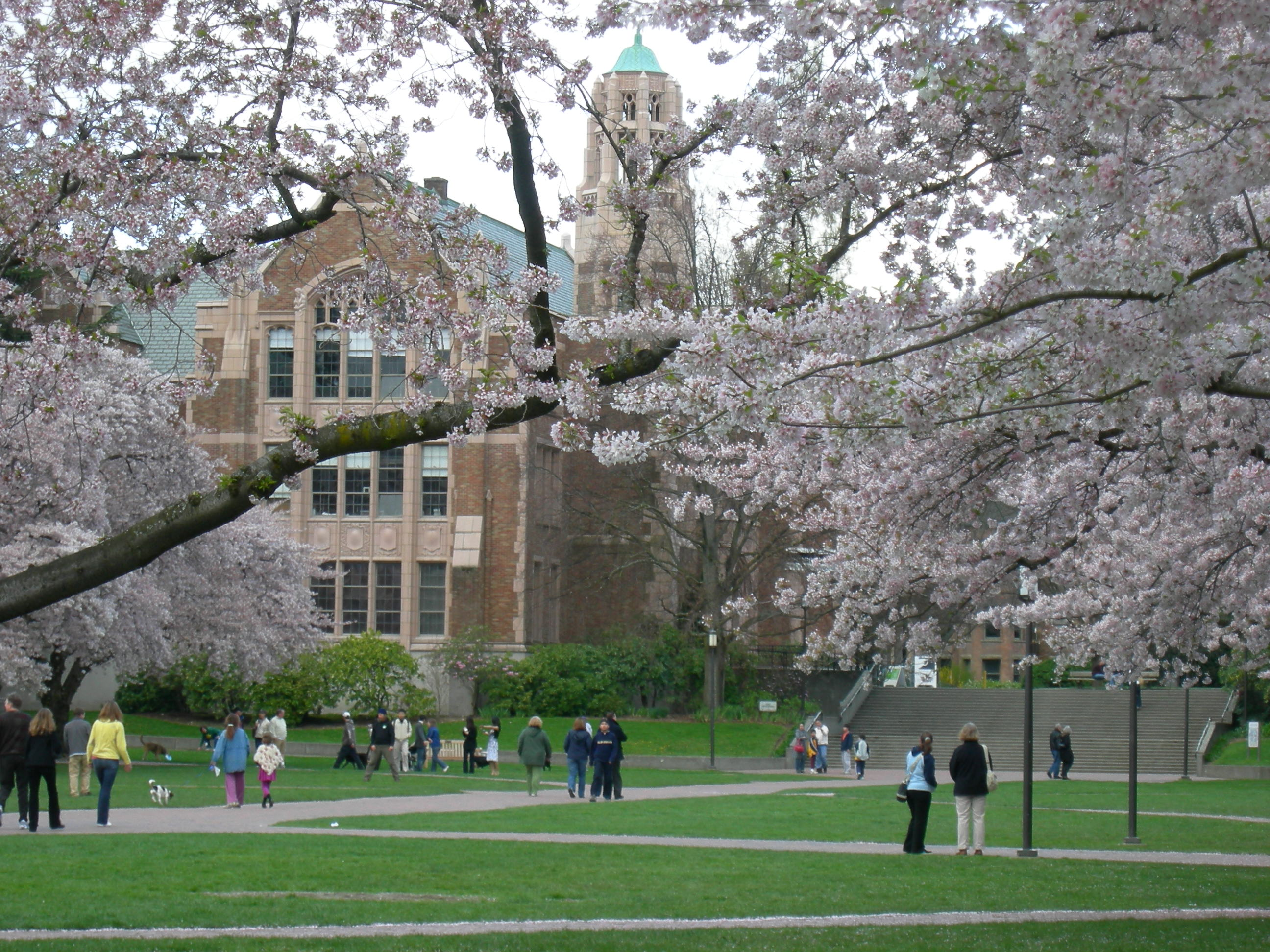
University of Washington Quad, Spring 2004, featuring the cherry blossoms

Officially the Liberal Arts Quadrangle, the quad is the most photographed location on campus. Raitt Hall and Savery Hall frame the northwestern boundary while Gowen, Smith, and Miller Halls frame the southeast. The southeast boundary is defined by the Art and Music Buildings (last to be built). The quad contains thirty Yoshino cherry trees, which blossom between mid-March and early April.

== Rainier Vista ==
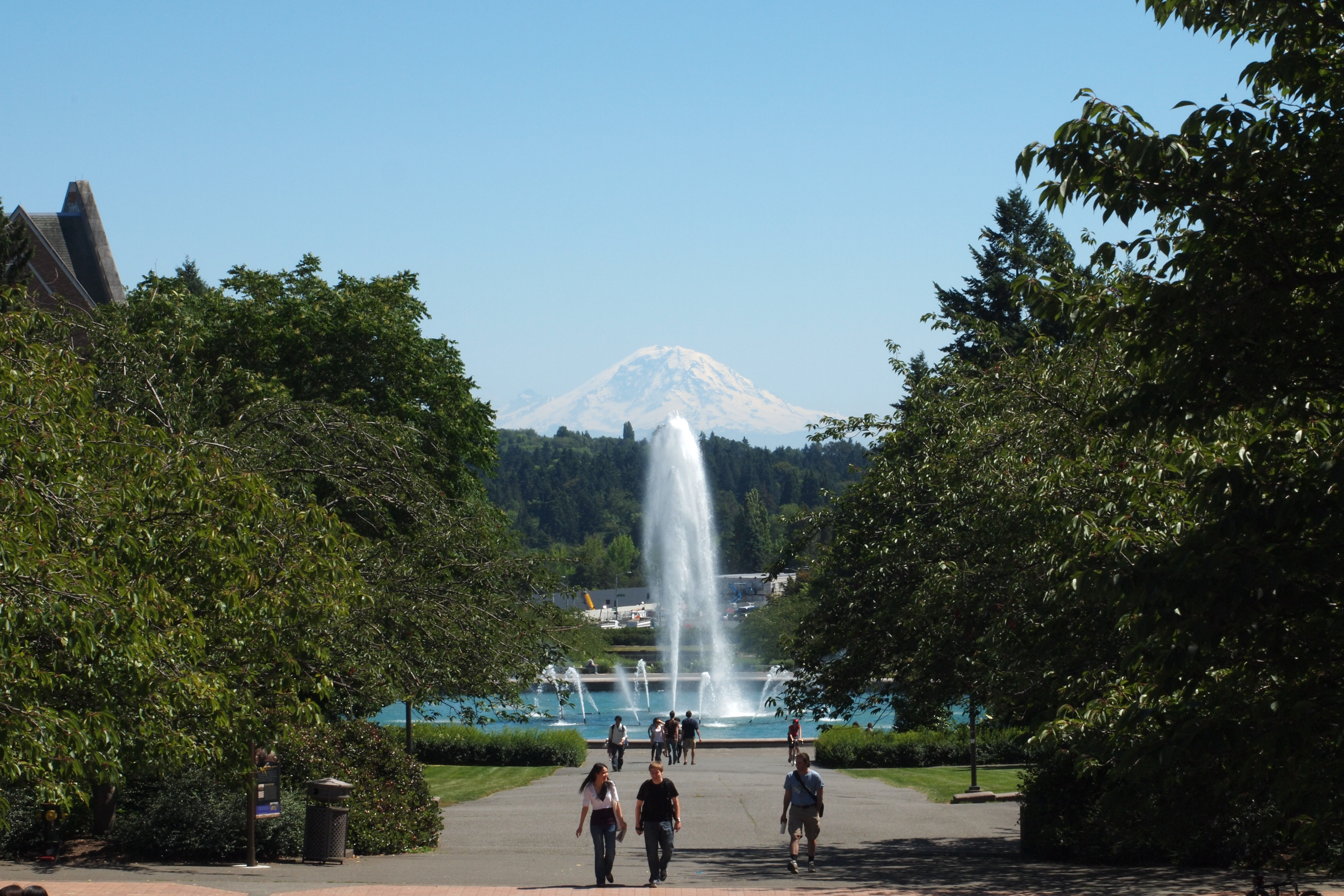
Drumheller Fountain and Mount Rainier

- Mary Gates Hall
- Johnson Hall
- Drumheller Fountain
- Guggenheim Hall
- Bagley Hall and Chemistry Building
- Sylvan Grove Theater and Columns

== Stevens Way ==
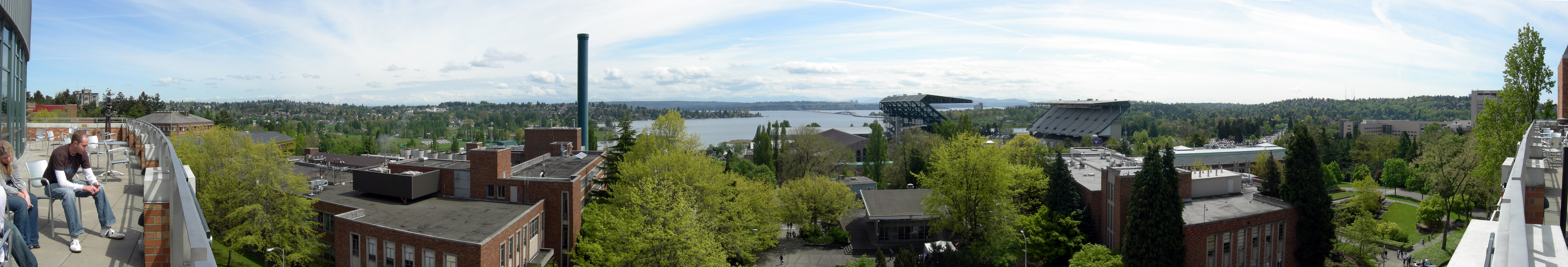
Panoramic view from the Alberg Terrace of the Paul G. Allen Center for Computer Science & Engineering looking East between the Mechanical Engineering building (left) and Civil Engineering building (right). Husky Stadium is in the distance to the right.

Stevens Way forms a horseshoe connecting West Campus at 15th Ave NE to Memorial Way at North Campus. The Burke-Gilman Trail runs parallel to most of Stevens Way. Buildings for the natural sciences and the School of Engineering are primarily located along Stevens Way.

- Architecture Hall
- Guthrie Hall
- Benson Hall
- Husky Union Building
- Molecular Engineering & Sciences
- Physics/Astronomy Auditorium, including the University of Washington Planetarium
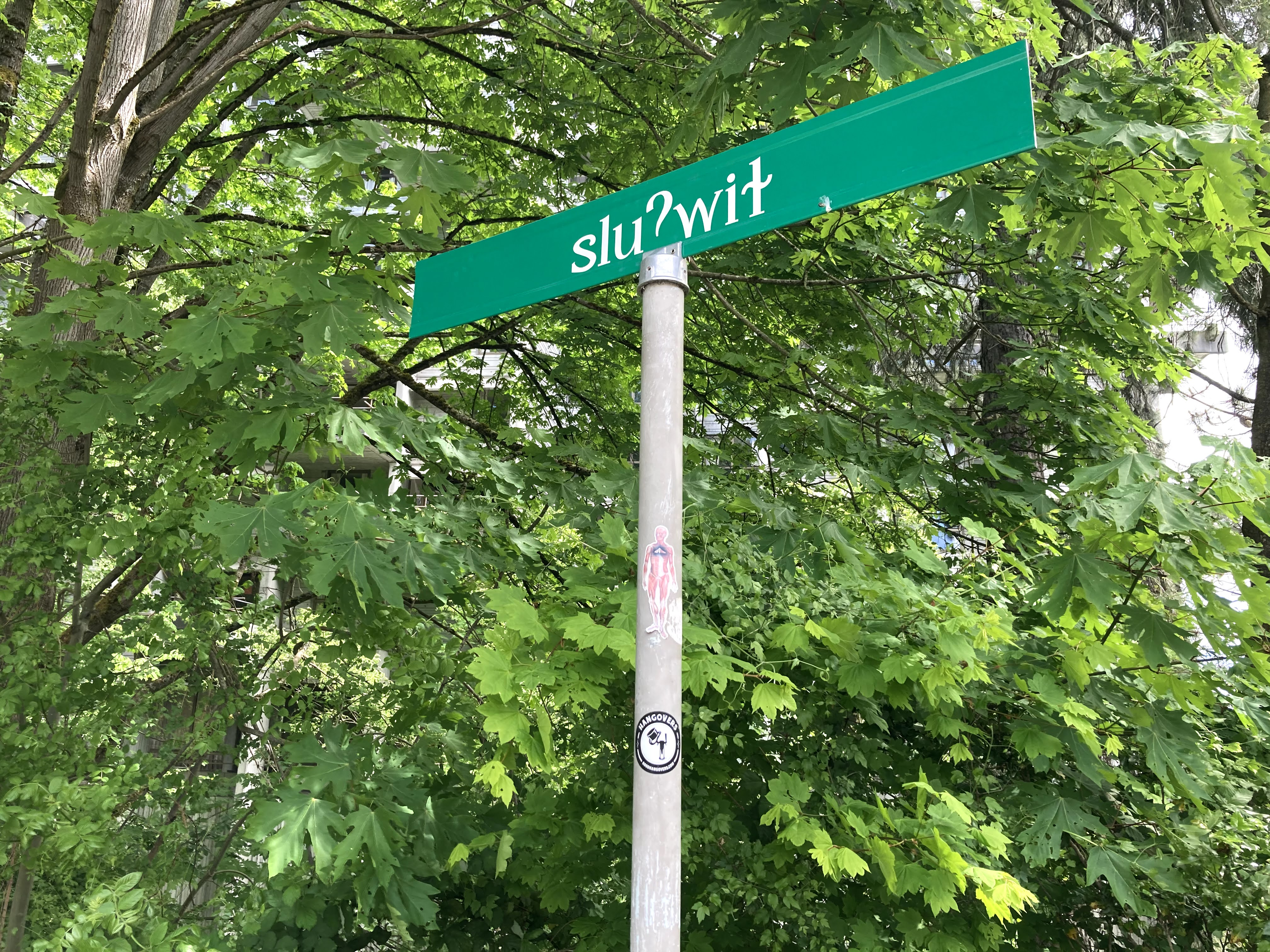
- A street sign in the Lushootseed language.
  Allen and Gates centers of Computer Science & Engineering

sluʔwiɫ, a cul-de-sac off Stevens Way, leads to the north campus dormitories McMahon, Haggett, McCarty, and Hansee halls. In 2020, the street name was changed from Whitman Court to its current Lushootseed name that loosely translates to “Little Canoe Channel”, honoring the village that once occupied the area where University Village stands today. Tami Hohn, a Puyallup tribe member and Southern Lushootseed lecturer at UW, helped formalize the street sign's spelling, font, and color.

== Campus Parkway and West Campus ==
- Henry Art Gallery at the Faye G. Allen Center for the Visual Arts
- Terry-Lander
- Jones Playhouse
- Condon Hall

== Pacific Street ==
- Warren G. Magnuson Health Sciences Building

== Montlake ==
Facilities for the Washington Huskies athletic teams stretch along Montlake Boulevard from the Montlake Cut to the Union Bay Natural Area. The area south of Husky Stadium (parking lot) and Pacific Street (medical center) was formerly a nine-hole golf course.

== Utilities and tunnels ==
The university generates electricity and heat through its own steam power plant that is powered by natural gas. It was built in 1908 to replace an earlier plant and used coal as its fuel source until 1988. The plant's steam is distributed to campus buildings through 7 miles (11 km) of tunnels that also carry other utilities. Construction of the tunnel system began as early as 1895 and continued through expansion of the campus; additional escape hatches were installed following the 2001 Nisqually earthquake.
