= TJO =

TJO may refer to:

- Theodor Jacobsen Observatory, at the University of Washington, Seattle, US
- Tara Jane O'Neil (born 1972), American musician
