= Fulldome =

Dome-based video projection environment

Fulldome refers to immersive dome-based video display environments. The dome, horizontal or tilted, is filled with real-time (interactive) or pre-rendered (linear) computer animations, live capture images, or composited environments.

Although the current technology emerged in the early-to-mid 1990s, fulldome environments have evolved from numerous influences, including immersive art and storytelling, with technological roots in domed architecture, planetariums, multi-projector film environments, flight simulation, and virtual reality.

Initial approaches to moving fulldome imagery used wide-angle lenses, both 35mm and 70 mm film, but the expense and ungainly nature of the film medium prevented much progress; furthermore, film formats such as Omnimax did not cover the full two pi steradians of the dome surface, leaving a section of the dome blank (though, due to seating arrangements, that part of the dome was not seen by most viewers). Later approaches to fulldome utilized monochromatic vector graphics systems projected through a fisheye lens. Contemporary configurations employ raster video projectors, either singly or grouped together to cover the dome surface with full-color images and animations.

Newer emerging technologies include flexible curved LED displays installed at the fulldome MSG Sphere with assistance from Industrial Light and Magic. They are working together with 360-degree content creators to create feature-length fulldome content utilizing 360 degree cameras including Red Digital Cinema.

== Video technology ==
Fulldome video projection can use a variety of technologies in two typical formats: single- and multiple-projector systems. The individual projector(s) can be driven by a variety of video sources, typically feeding material rendered in either real-time or pre-rendered modes. The result is a video image that covers an entire domed projection surface, yielding an immersive experience that fills a viewer's field of view.

=== Single-projector versus multiple-projector systems ===
Single-projector fulldome video systems use a single (or mixed) video source displayed through a single fisheye lens, typically located at or near the center of a hemispherical projection surface. A single projector has the benefit of avoiding edge blends (see below) between multiple projectors. The main disadvantage of single fisheye systems is that they are limited to the resolution of one projector, and in the smallest dimension of the video image to cover a full dome. Another disadvantage of central projectors is the loss of the center of the dome for optimal viewing of the reconstructed perspective view provided by true hemispheric projection, a problem shared with traditional planetarium projectors. However, this disadvantage fades as audience size increases (everyone cannot be at the center of the dome anyway).

Single-projector mirror systems, initially pioneered by Mirrordome at Swinburne University, are now offered by various manufacturers. These systems are positioned along the edge of the dome to enhance seating capacity, reduce costs, and facilitate the transition of analog planetariums to digital formats without sacrificing their star projectors. It is also possible to build such a system at relatively low cost. The main disadvantage is noticeably lower projection quality compared to purpose-built lenses, despite being able to project a higher proportion of the projector resolution.

Multiple-projector fulldome video systems rely on two or more video projectors edge-blended to create a seamless image that covers a hemispherical projection surface; splitting the entire image up into segments allows for higher-resolution imagery and projector placement that does not intrude on the viewing area underneath the dome. A disadvantage of multiple projection is the need to frequently adjust the alignment of projectors and the uneven aging of separate projectors leading to brightness and color differences between segments. Even minor performance differences between projectors can be obvious when projecting a solid color across the entire scene. Edge blended areas where projectors overlap often have some smearing, double images, and can have very obvious additive black level areas if poorly designed or configured.

=== Common video projector technology ===
A wide variety of video projection technologies has been employed in domes, including cathode ray tube (CRT), Digital Light Processing (DLP), liquid crystal display (LCD), liquid crystal on silicon (LCOS), and most recently, two varieties of laser projectors (see the laser video projector).

For multi-projector systems, in particular, display devices must have a low black level (i.e., project little or no light when no signal is sent to them) to allow for reasonable edge-blending between the different projector footprints. Otherwise, overlapping video images will have an additive effect, causing a complex pattern of grey to appear even when no image is being projected. This becomes particularly important for users in the planetarium field, who have a vested interest in projecting a dark night sky. The desire for projectors to "go to black" has resulted in continued use of CRT technology, even as newer and less expensive technologies have emerged.

LCD projectors have fundamental limits on their ability to project true black as well as light, which has tended to limit their use in planetariums. LCOS and modified LCOS projectors have improved on LCD contrast ratios while also eliminating the "screen door" effect of small gaps between LCD pixels. "Dark chip" DLP projectors improve on the standard DLP design and can offer a relatively inexpensive solution with bright images, but the black level requires physical baffling of the projectors. As the technology matures and reduces in price, laser projection looks promising for dome projection as it offers bright images, large dynamic range and a very wide color space.

DOME lenses and standard lens are similar in some ways. They both depend on the type of display device: LCD, DLP, LCOS, D-ILA, etc.; and the size chip or panel that is part of this device. The unique feature of the DOME lens is the actual shape of the glass, the projected image spills out from the top and all around the circumference of the lens. The biggest advantage is how this type of lens maintains focus over the full 180 x 180 field of view. A single standard flat field or curved field lens would have major focus and distortion issue. Several lens developers offer DOME lenses with each designed to a specific projector class and a display device. These lenses can cover a variety of pixel sizes and display resolutions.

=== Types of content ===
360-degree and 180-degree content creator filmmakers are developing more and more refined feature-length ready fulldome films and virtual reality content every year. And computer graphic (CG) content is a source of material for fulldome, that can be live simulator output, such as from planetarium simulation software, or prerecorded fulldome video. Live-Action FullDome videos are becoming more available for dome use as digital video camera resolutions increase. Real Time content can also be displayed, referring to fulldome content that is not pre-rendered and generated using VJ software or game engines.

Notable films able to be displayed in the Fulldome format are Flesh and Sand by Academy Award winning director Alejandro González Iñárritu and three-time Academy Award-winning cinematographer Emmanuel Lubezki. The immersive film won a Special Achievement Academy Award by the Academy of Motion Picture Arts and Sciences.

Another notable film able to be displayed in the Fulldome format is The Protectors from Academy Award-winning director Kathryn Bigelow.

Other similar fulldome content is Avatar Flight of Passage.

== History ==
1983
First Evans & Sutherland Digistar I calligraphic scan (projection of light points and lines – also known as vector scan) planetarium projector at the Science Museum of Virginia in Richmond, Virginia, U.S.A.
1992
First dome-based vector/calligraphic scan scientific visualization system at SIGGRAPH, installed by the North Carolina Supercomputing Center using a reprogrammed Digistar I for molecular visualization
1994
Alternate Realities Corporation premieres their first VisionDome prototype at Glaxo Inc. in Research Triangle Park, North Carolina, U.S.A. Developed at the North Carolina Supercomputing Center, the VisionDome uses a raster scan projector (full-color video) and fisheye lens to project interactive 3D graphics onto a 5-meter dome.
1995
First Evans & Sutherland Digistar II calligraphic scan planetarium projector opens at the London Planetarium, UK

British Telecom uses a vertical five-meter Alternate Realities Corporation VisionDome for its "Shared Spaces" media environment research programme, incorporating computer graphics, virtual landscapes, data graphics, video, composited live action. and spatialized sound.

August: Full-day SIGGRAPH '95 course entitled "Graphics Design and Production for Hemispheric Projection" introduces spherical perspective, hemispheric projection, and suggests a convergence of simulation systems employing edge-blended raster video projection, virtual reality systems such as the CAVE (Cave Automatic Virtual Environment), and planetarium theaters to create a new medium with an enhanced illusion of presence. Organized by Ed Lantz with presenters Mike Hutton, Steven Savage and Chris Ward.
1996
July 13–19: First Goto Virtuarium demonstrated at the International Planetarium Society Conference in Osaka, Japan

October 26–29: Evans & Sutherland StarRider demonstrated at Association of Science-Technology Centers conference in Pittsburgh, Pennsylvania, U.S.A.
1997
April: First permanent installation of Spitz ElectricSky at Northern Lights Center in Yukon Territory, Canada using three Electrohome 9500 CRT projectors, line-quadrupled video playback, and real-time edge-blends for 200x60-degree field-of-view virtual desktop. Bowen Technovation produces the first three shows for this new system.

May 7–10: Spitz ElectricSky publicly unveiled at MAPS conference in Chadds Ford, PA. Bowen Technovation introduces show capabilities and production methods for the new technology.
1998
May 22 – September 30: The Oceania pavilion opens at the EXPO 98 in Lisbon, Portugal. Among numerous virtual reality exhibits, it includes The Artefact Room, a 7-meter dome VisionDome theater with interactive 3D animations of a fly-through of Atlantis that are controlled by 40 participants simultaneously.

June 28 – July 2: Sky-Skan premieres SkyVision at the International Planetarium Society Conference in London, UK. First astronomical digital fulldome animation shown to audiences there, "Pillars of Creation" by Don Davis, and a solar system tour and International Space Station animation by Tom Casey of Home Run Pictures. This marks the first public demonstration of fulldome video, distinguished by playback of actual video—as opposed to previous efforts based on proprietary image generators using vector or raster graphics—covering a full hemisphere.

December: Vertical dome installation by SGI and Trimension at University of Teesside, UK.

December: Houston Museum of Natural Science opens SkyVision system as a permanent public theater, with seed funding from NASA in partnership with Rice University. First playback fulldome show: "Cosmic Mysteries".

1999
Adler Planetarium reopens in Chicago, Illinois, U.S.A., with an Evans & Sutherland StarRider system

Evans & Sutherland premiers their first linear playback show "We Take You There" at SIGGRAPH '99

Houston Museum of Natural Science premieres the first Earth Science fulldome show "Powers of Time"

Carnegie Museum of Natural history opens the Earth Theater with a SkyVision system

2000
Hayden Planetarium reopens at the American Museum of Natural History in New York, New York, U.S.A., with a Silicon Graphics Onyx2 and Trimension video system

Houston Museum of Natural Science in conjunction with Rice University premieres the first Earth and Space Weather show "Force 5" (updated in 2010 and still in distribution)
2002
BMW Group EarthLounge Premiere of the ADLIP (All-Dome Laser Image Projection) System from Carl Zeiss with SkyVision Full Dome Video System and DigitalSky from Sky-Skan and fulldome film by LivinGlobe (ag4, Exponent3) in the world's largest fulldome projection dome (24m) at the UN World Summit on Sustainable Development, Johannesburg South Africa.
2002
First full Digital planetarium in the world installed (RSA Cosmos SkyExplorer) inaugurated in Valladolid, Spain.
2003
Clark Planetarium (formerly Hansen Planetarium) reopens in Salt Lake City, Utah, U.S.A., with an Evans & Sutherland Digistar 3

Adler Planetarium upgrades their StarRider to the new Evans & Sutherland Digistar 3 system. The mini-dome also opens in their production department running both the Digistar 3 SP and Producer systems.

The first digital planetarium systems designed for the portable market are introduced independently by Digitalis Education Solutions and by Sky-Skan (in partnership with Rice University and the Houston Museum of Natural Science). HMNS/Rice version subsequently diverges to become Discovery Dome, in distribution through ePlanetarium.

July 27–28: First industry-wide showcase of fulldome programming at SIGGRAPH in the Reuben H. Fleet Science Center including full-day course on fulldome art and science entitled "Computer Graphics for Large-Scale Immersive Theaters."

November 3: The Eugenides Planetarium of Athens, Greece, re-opens premiering its first 40-minute production "Cosmic Odyssey" with both a fulldome Sky Skan Skyvision-Digital Sky system and an Evans & Sutherland Digistar 3 system under a 24,5 meter Astrotec dome.
2004
First DomeFest held at the LodeStar Astronomy Center in Albuquerque, New Mexico, U.S.A.

First ASTC Fulldome Showcase held at Tech Museum of Innovation, San Jose, CA

First Immersive Cinema movie R+J (Romeo and Juliet) by LivinGlobe

First fulldome animation feature film `Kaluoka´hina, the Enchanted Reef´ Kaluoka´hina, the Enchanted Reef by Softmachine Softmachine

December: Beijing Planetarium New Building opens in Beijing, China, with a Silicon Graphics Onyx 300 and the first fulldome laser display (Zeiss ADLIP)
2005
GOTO installs the first complete fulldome sphere at EXPO 2005 in Aichi, Japan
2007
October: Obscura Digital and The Elumenati develop a temporary 90' diameter geodesic fulldome experience for Google's Zeitgeist event on the Google campus

UCSB AlloSphere opens with full surround audio and video for multiple users
2008
January: Sky-Skan installs the world's first full dome 3D Stereoscopic Planetarium at Imiloa Astronomy Center of Hawaii in Hilo, Hawaii. Imiloa Planetarium first Stereoscopic show is "Dawn of the Space Age" produced by Mirage IIID.
2008
July: Sky-Skan demonstrates Definiti 8K: a 60,000 lumen, 8k x 8k fulldome projection system at IPS 2008 at Adler Planetarium in Chicago rivaling image quality of large-format film (system subsequently opens at Beijing Planetarium)
2008
July: Carl Zeiss demonstrates prototype "Velvet" projectors at IPS 2008 at Adler Planetarium in Chicago. Zeiss designed the Velvet Series from the ground up for the planetarium environment, and achieves an unparalleled black background to preserve the quality of the fulldome/planetarium experience.
2009
March: University of Colorado Denver College of Arts and Media (CAM) set up a 25 Mac Octo-core Cinema 4D and After Effects Render Farm to specifically process full dome content alongside Denver Museum of Nature Science and IMERSA
2010
June: Vortex Immersion Media installs a 50-foot immersive cinema digital dome theater on the studio lot at Los Angeles Center Studios in downtown Los Angeles as an arts and entertainment R&D studio managed and run by Ed Lantz, MEE. Together, he and Kate McCallum, Producer, create an AIR: Artist In Residence Program to promote the creation and presentation of experimental projects in the dome space such as; live music+art concerts, mixed media musicals, a 360 ballet, performance art, theater, and 360 cinema projects.

November: Institute of American Indian Arts opens the world's first fully articulating digital dome.

2011
January: University of Washington Planetarium opens first 6 channel HD full dome digital projection conversion based entirely on Microsoft Research WorldWide Telescope. Done on a hardware and construction budget of 40,000 USD the planetarium features the world's largest all-sky panorama at 1 terapixel, allowing zooming to 1 arc-second per pixel anywhere in the sky. UW graduate student Philip Rosenfield presented a paper at the Astronomical Society of the Pacific 2010 Cosmos and EPO symposia describing the design and construction of the system.
2013
October: Fiske Planetarium at University of Colorado opens true hybrid optical-8K digital theater, with a Sky-Skan 8K Definition projection system linked to a Megastar IIA optical star projector.
2014
July: Digitalis Education Solutions, Inc releases the lightest all-in-one digital planetarium projection system, the Digitarium Iota. Weighing only 20.6lbs and 33.5lbs respectively, the Digitarium Iota and Digitarium Delta 3 systems represent a portable-first design philosophy to complement its new flagship fixed-dome system, the Digitarium Aethos.
2015
January: Emerald planetariums releases their 3D portable digital theaters, with a stereoscopic fulldome projection system linked to their MV2 planetarium simulation software. As a part of the LITE series of portable planetarium systems.

== See also ==
- Virtual reality
- Flexible display
- LED display
- Academy of Motion Picture Arts and Sciences
- 180-degree video
- 360-degree video
- 360 degree camera
- Curved screens
- High technology
- IMAX Corporation
- IMAX Dome
- Immersion (virtual reality)
- Sphere
- Mixed reality
- Oculus
- Red Digital Cinema
- Technology
