= Odegaard Undergraduate Library =

Coordinates: 47°39′24″N 122°18′37″W

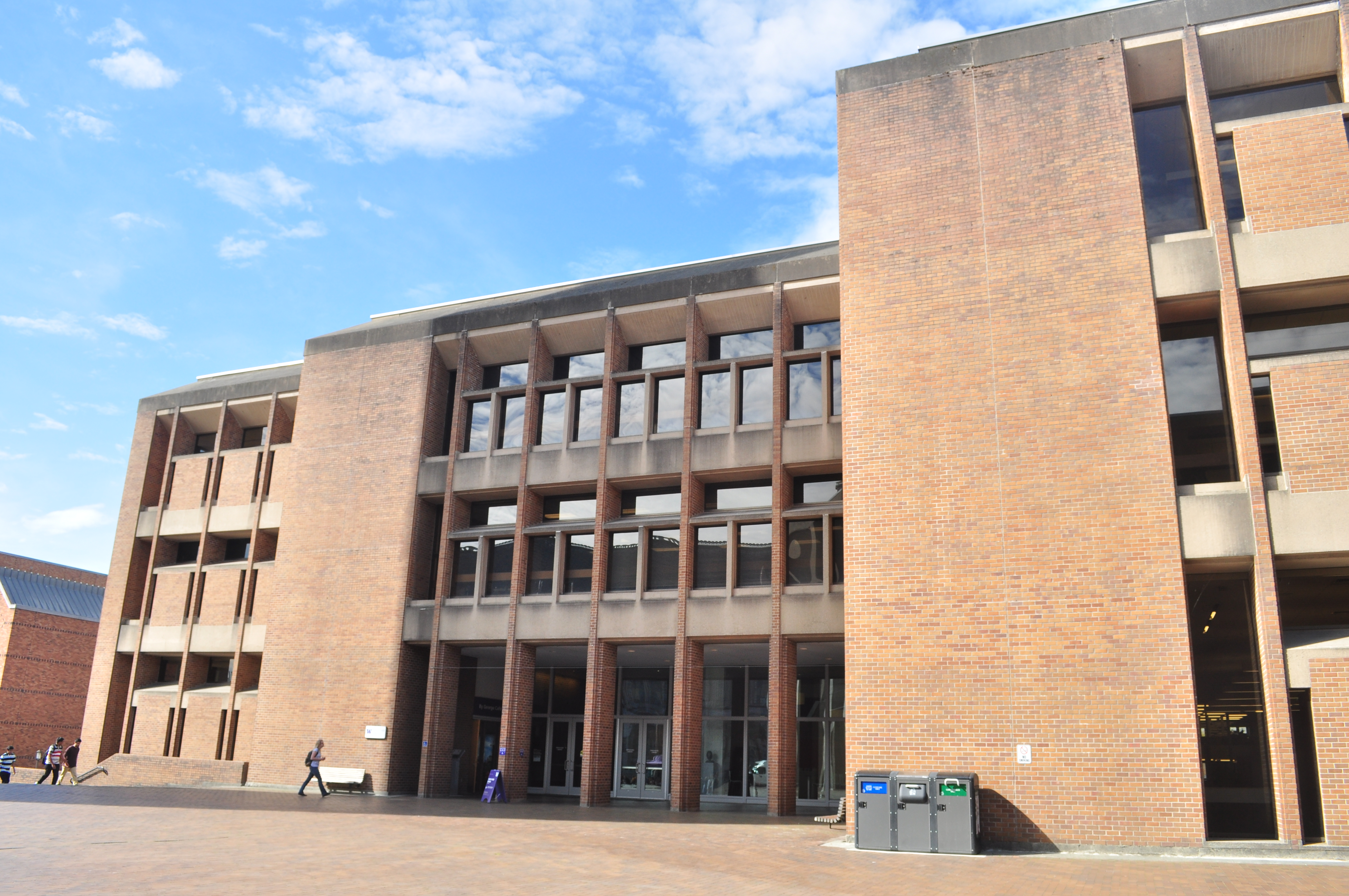
- Odegaard Undergraduate Library main entrance
- Interactive map of the Odegaard Undergraduate Library area

General information
- Architectural style: Brutalist
- Location: Seattle, Washington, United States of America
- Completed: 1972
- Renovated: 2013
- Client: University of Washington

Design and construction
- Architects: Kirk, Wallace & McKinley
- Main contractor: Sellen Construction

Website
- Odegaard Undergraduate Library

The Charles E. Odegaard Undergraduate Library (OUGL) is a library on the campus of the University of Washington in Seattle, Washington. It houses secondary stacks, a learning commons and on-campus technology resources for students, primarily undergraduates. Named after the 19th president of the university, it opened in 1972, replacing the small undergraduate library previously located at Suzzallo Library. It fronts the northwest corner of Red Square and provides access to the parking garage below the plaza, which was built simultaneously with the library. In addition to library space, the building includes a cafeteria and newsstand on the ground floor.

The Odegaard Undergraduate Library was renovated from June 18, 2012, to June 24, 2013. The library's renovation architects were awarded the 2014 American Institute of Architects' Institute Honor Awards for Interior Architecture.

== Architecture ==
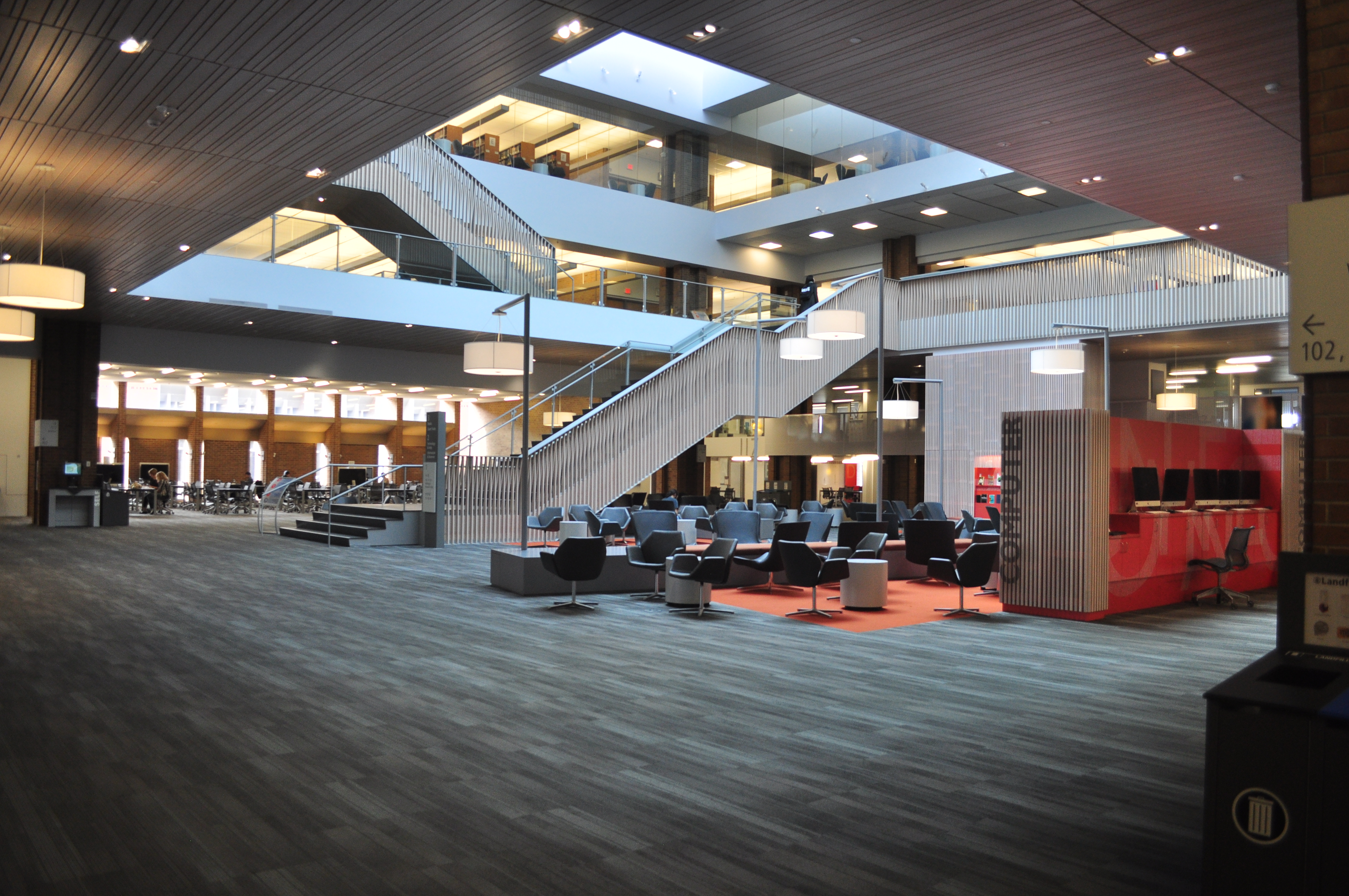
The renovated interior of the Odegaard Undergraduate Library

The library was originally designed by Kirk, Wallace, McKinley & Associates, led by Paul Kirk. It was one of three Brutalist-style buildings constructed as part of an expansion to the university's Central Plaza in the early 1970s, along with Kane Hall and Meany Hall for the Performing Arts. As student population grew in the 1960s, the existing Suzzallo Library became insufficient to serve the needs of both graduate and undergraduate students, leading to the construction of the new undergraduate library.

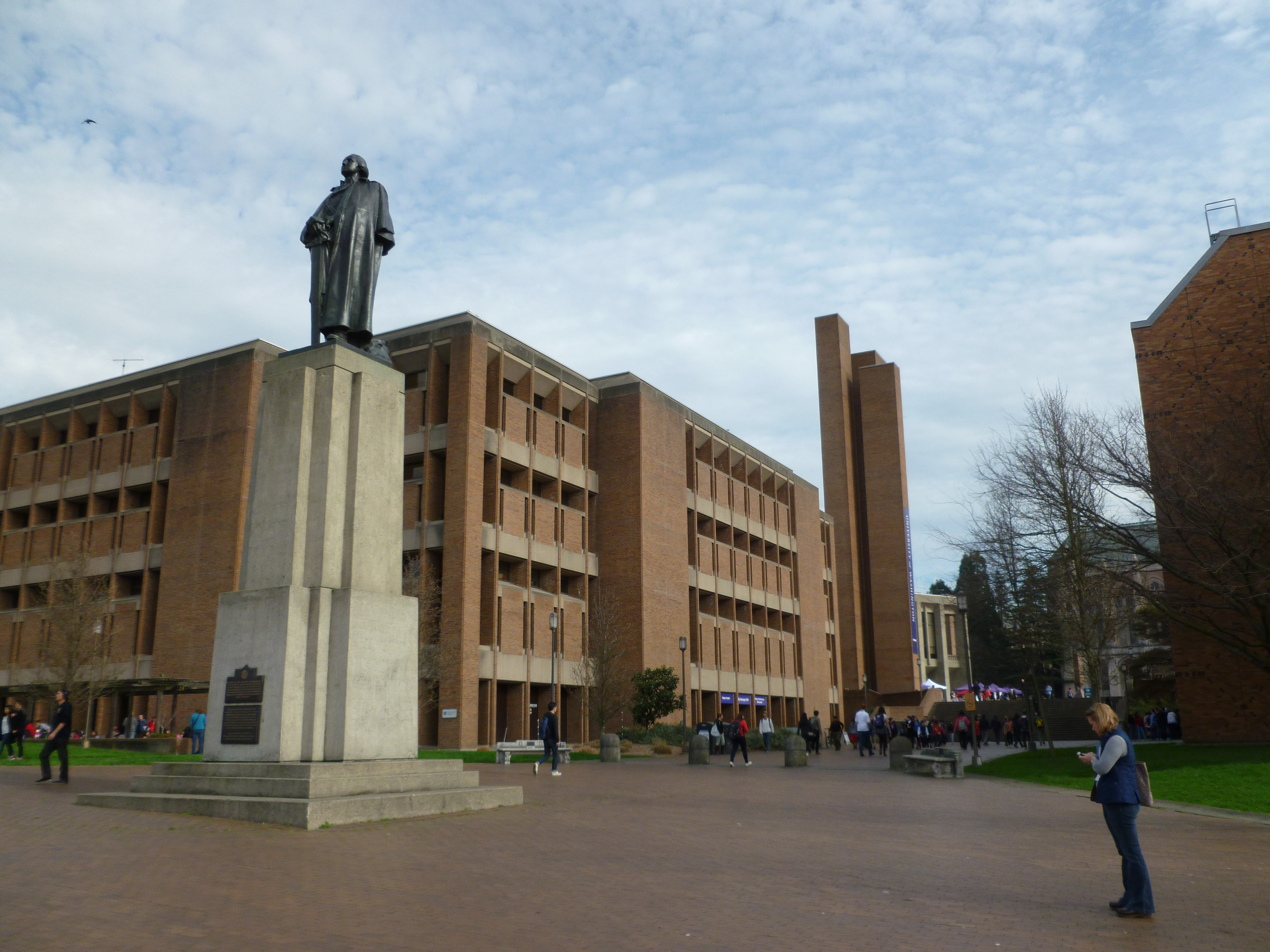
Back of the library building, with access to the ground floor

The building's main façade and entryway is located on the northwestern side of the campus's Central Plaza, also known as Red Square. The building is relatively cube-shaped with a largely flat roof, and the exterior is dominated by red bricks, concrete, and large recessed windows. The main library space consists of three floors that surround a central atrium. They house the library collections, open study areas, computer workstations, and rooms for both individual and collaborative work. There is also a ground floor one story below the main entrance that contains a cafeteria and newsstand. Due to the slope of the surrounding ground, this floor is accessible directly from the west side of the building.

The library was renovated in 1997 and again in 2012-2013. The 2012-2013 renovation was designed by the Miller Hull Partnership and focused mostly on the interior of the library space. The redesign created a more open feel to the central atrium by shrinking the central staircase and adding a skylight. They also added new classrooms and technology studios, window booths for group work, and a glass enclosure on the third floor to allow for more quiet study.
