= Red Square (University of Washington) =

- Location: Seattle, Washington, United States
- Interactive map of Red Square
- Coordinates: 47°39′21″N 122°18′34″W

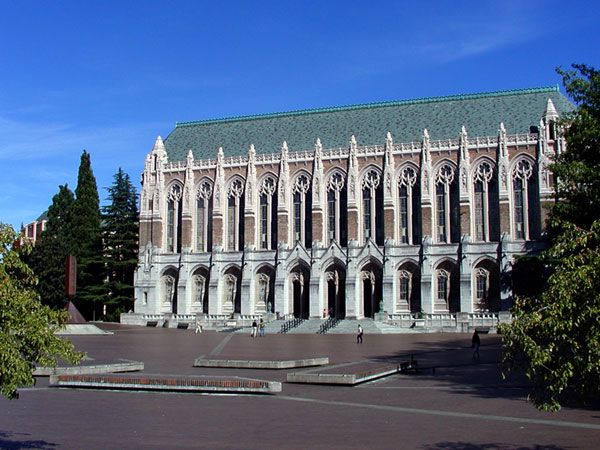
Suzzallo Library from the southwest in 2004

Red Square, officially Central Plaza or the Suzzallo Quadrangle, is a large open square on the Seattle campus of the University of Washington that serves as a hub for two of the university's major axes, connecting the campus's northern Liberal Arts Quadrangle ("The Quad") with the science and engineering buildings found on the lower campus. The plaza is paved with red brick, and becomes notoriously slippery during rain.

During the Alaska–Yukon–Pacific Exposition in 1909, the square was the site for the temporary U.S. Government Building. After the exposition closed, the building was removed and the area left an open field that eventually became known as Central Plaza or Suzzallo Quadrangle, after Suzzallo Library, along its eastern edge.

In 1969, the field was excavated to construct an underground parking garage; the engineers who designed the garage thought that the rain on the grass would leak into the garage, leading to the choice of a distinctive red brick surface. Cassandra Amesely, then an editor of the student paper The Daily, convinced the student population to refer to the area as Red Square, presumably in reference to the color of the brick. Whether it was also meant to refer to Moscow's Red Square in an era known for student activism is unclear.

The northwest area of the square is dominated by three adjacent brick monoliths, one to ventilate the underground garage and the other two for aesthetic reasons. The northeast corner of the square features a version of Barnett Newman's Broken Obelisk sculpture. Steps to the southeast lead down Rainier Vista to Drumheller Fountain, aligned with Mount Rainier. A 1909 bronze statue of George Washington is below the west entrance, facing west toward The Brothers of the Olympic Mountains. The elevation of Red Square is approximately 150 feet (45 m) above sea level.

The plaza is surrounded by the following buildings:

- Suzzallo Library to the east: the university's central library
- Gerberding Hall to the southeast: university administration
- Meany Hall to the southwest: performing arts facilities
- Odegaard Undergraduate Library to the northwest
- Kane Hall to the northeast: lecture halls
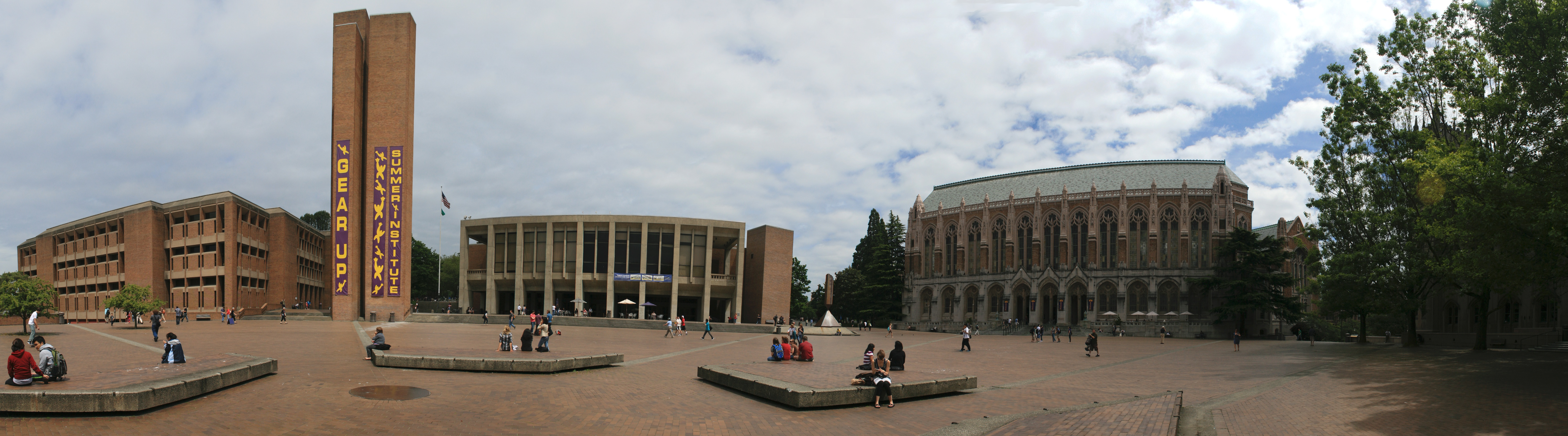
Panoramic view from the southwest in 2010 (Odegaard, Kane, Suzzallo, and Gerberding (behind trees))
University of Washington Red Square (Central Plaza)
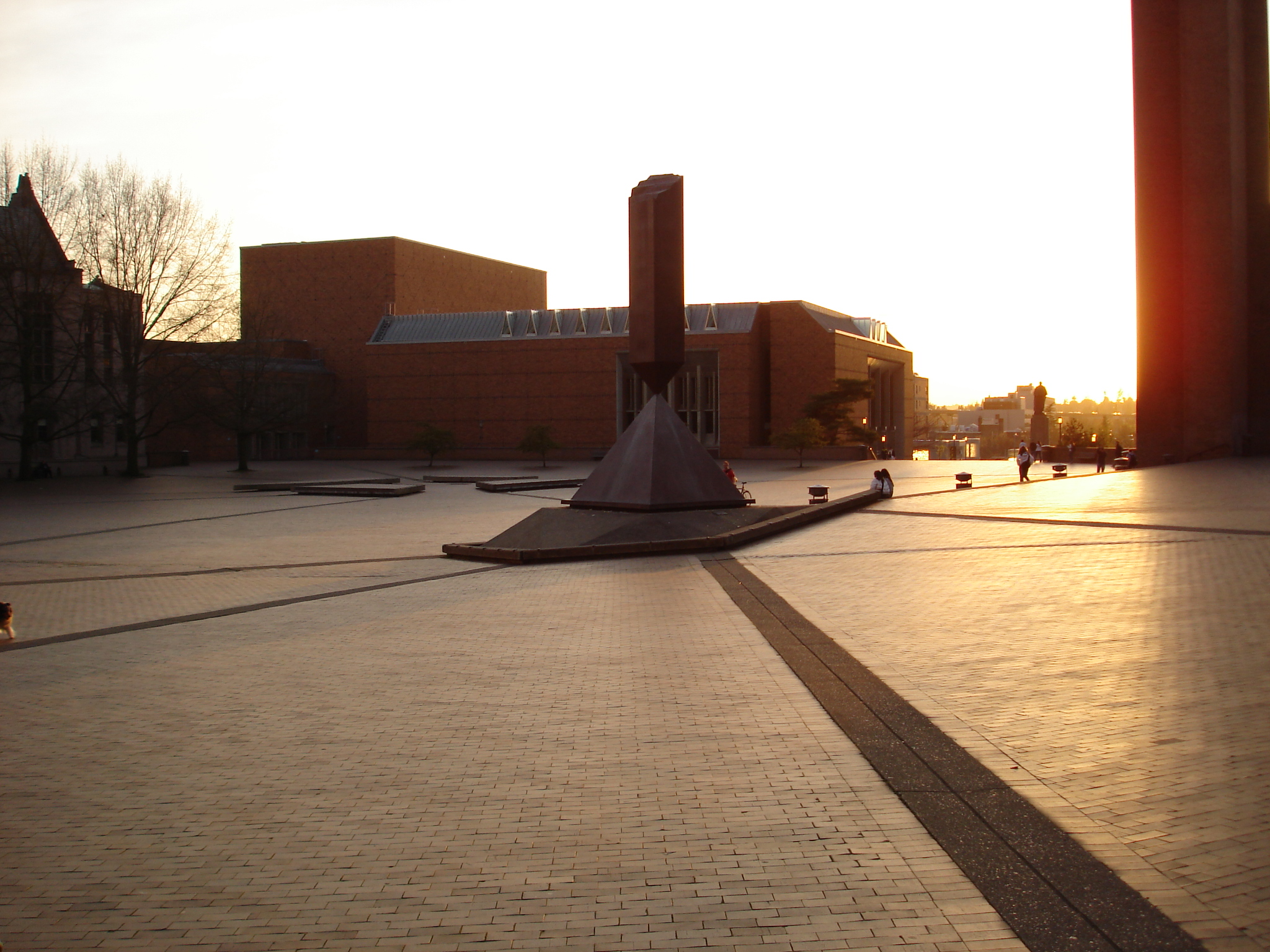
Red Square at dusk

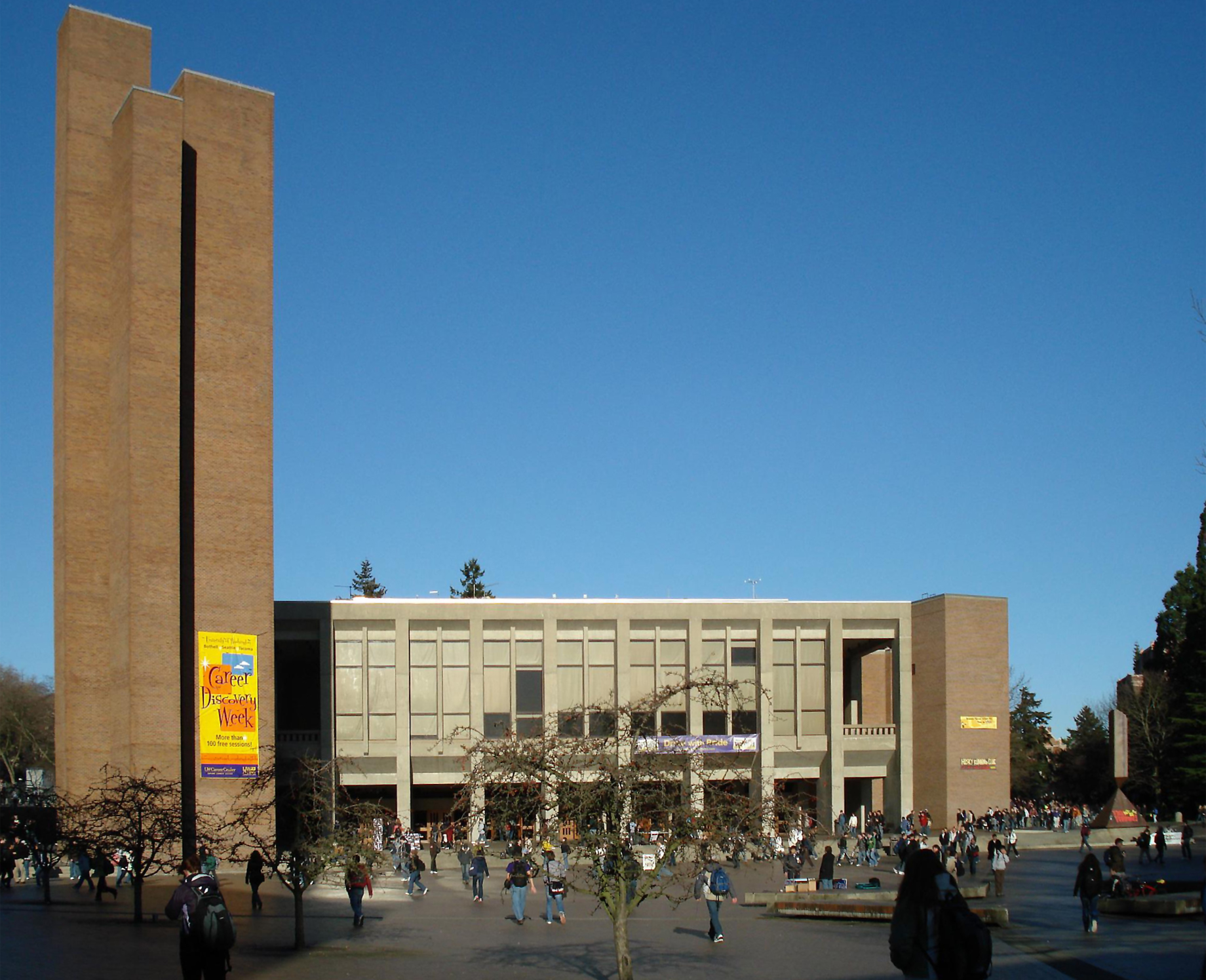
Kane Hall and the three brick monoliths

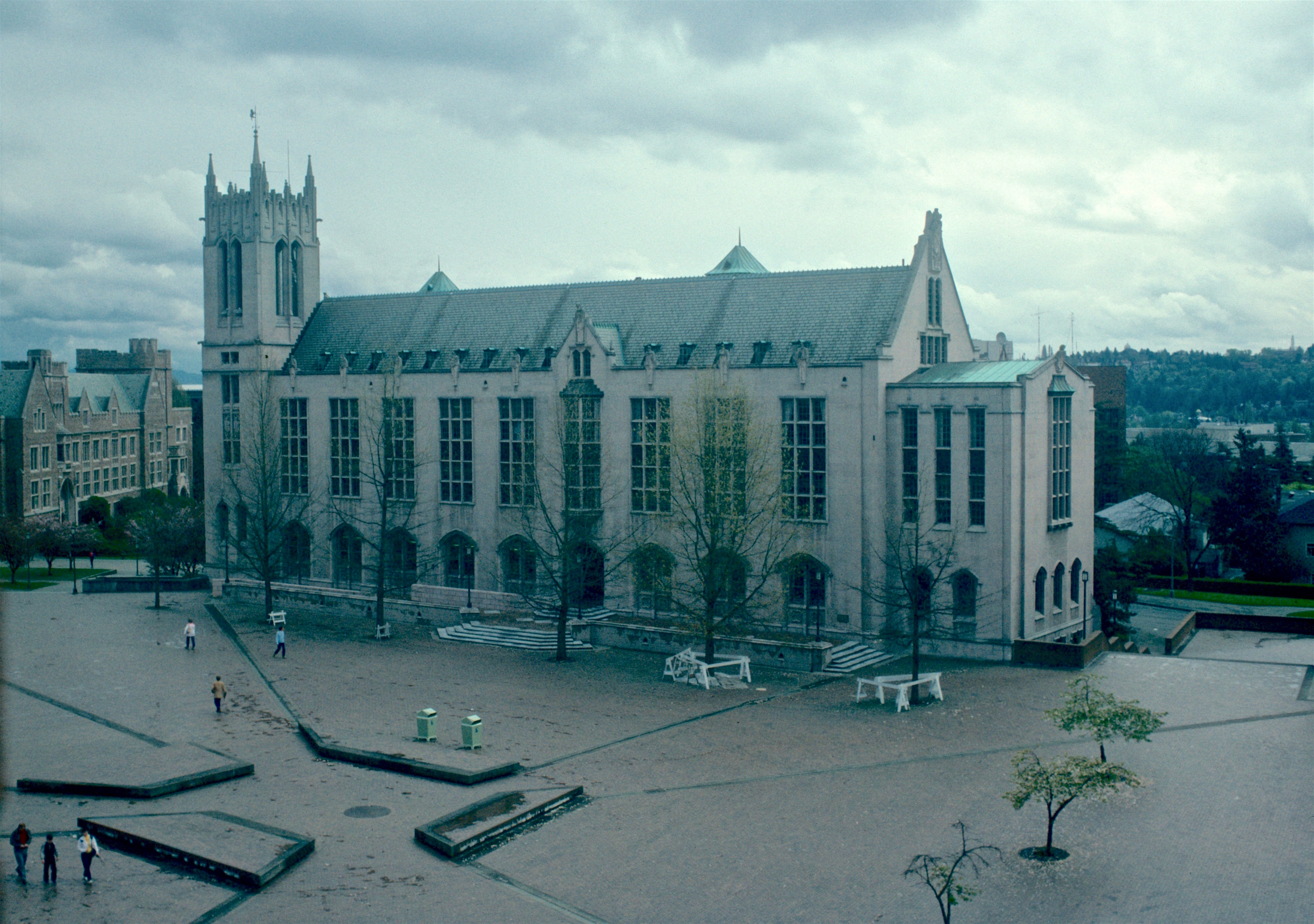
Gerberding Hall, viewed from Odegaard in 1984

== College GameDay ==
Red Square has hosted ESPN's College GameDay three times, in 2013, 2016, and 2023.
