= Meany Hall =

Coordinates: 47°39′19″N 122°18′38″W

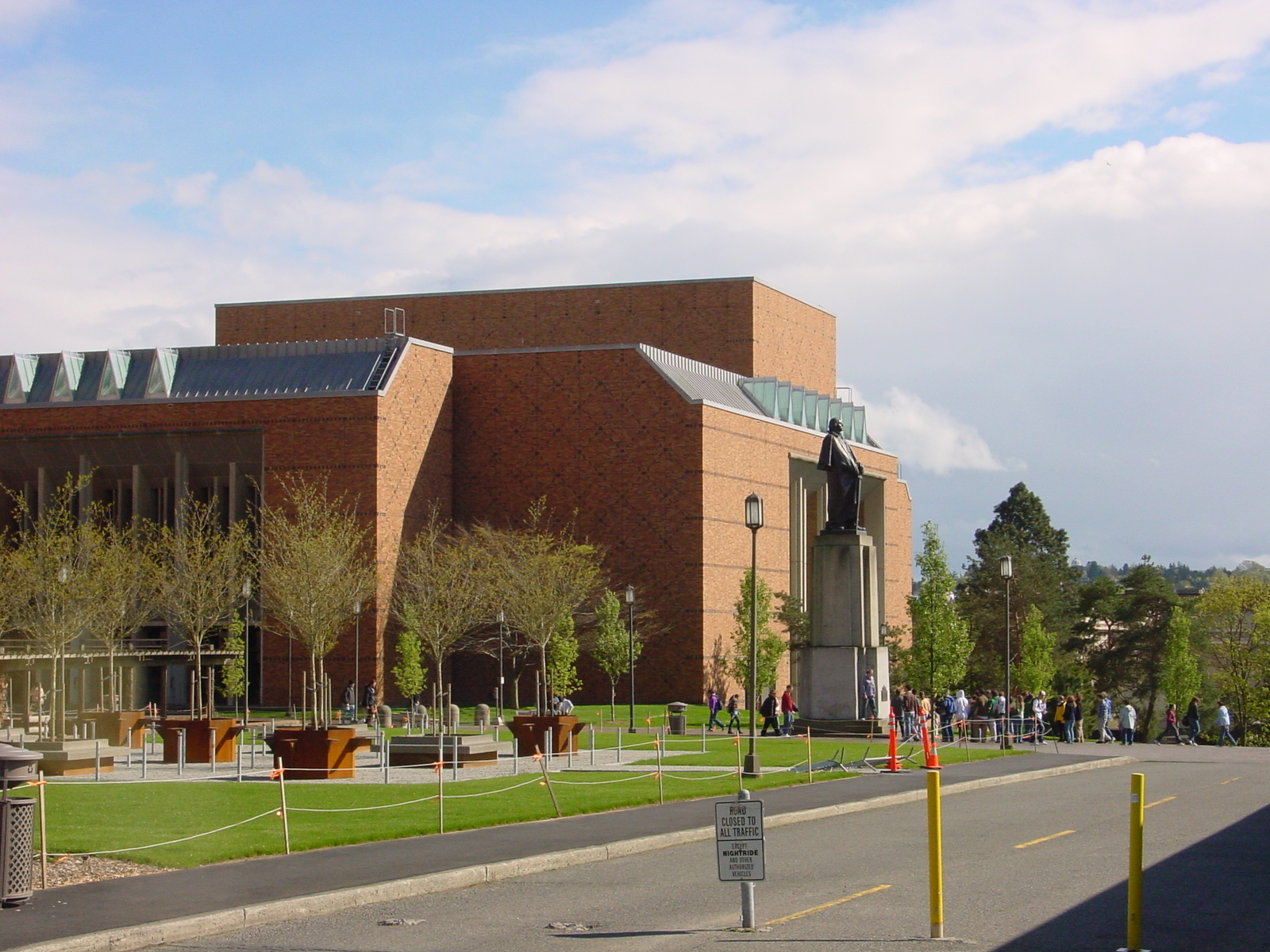
Meany Hall at the University of Washington

Meany Hall has been the name of two buildings on the University of Washington campus in Seattle. Individual performance venues include the 1,206-seat proscenium Katharyn Alvord Gerlich Theater, and the 238-seat Meany Studio Theatre.

Meany Hall hosts international performers through Meany Center for the Performing Arts, as well as performers from the School of Drama, School of Music, Dance Program, and the Center for Digital Arts & Experimental Media. The lobby of Katharyn Alvord Gerlich Theater is adorned with the artwork from various artists, including Dale Chihuly, Jacob Lawrence, and Robert Rauschenberg.

== "Old" Meany Hall ==
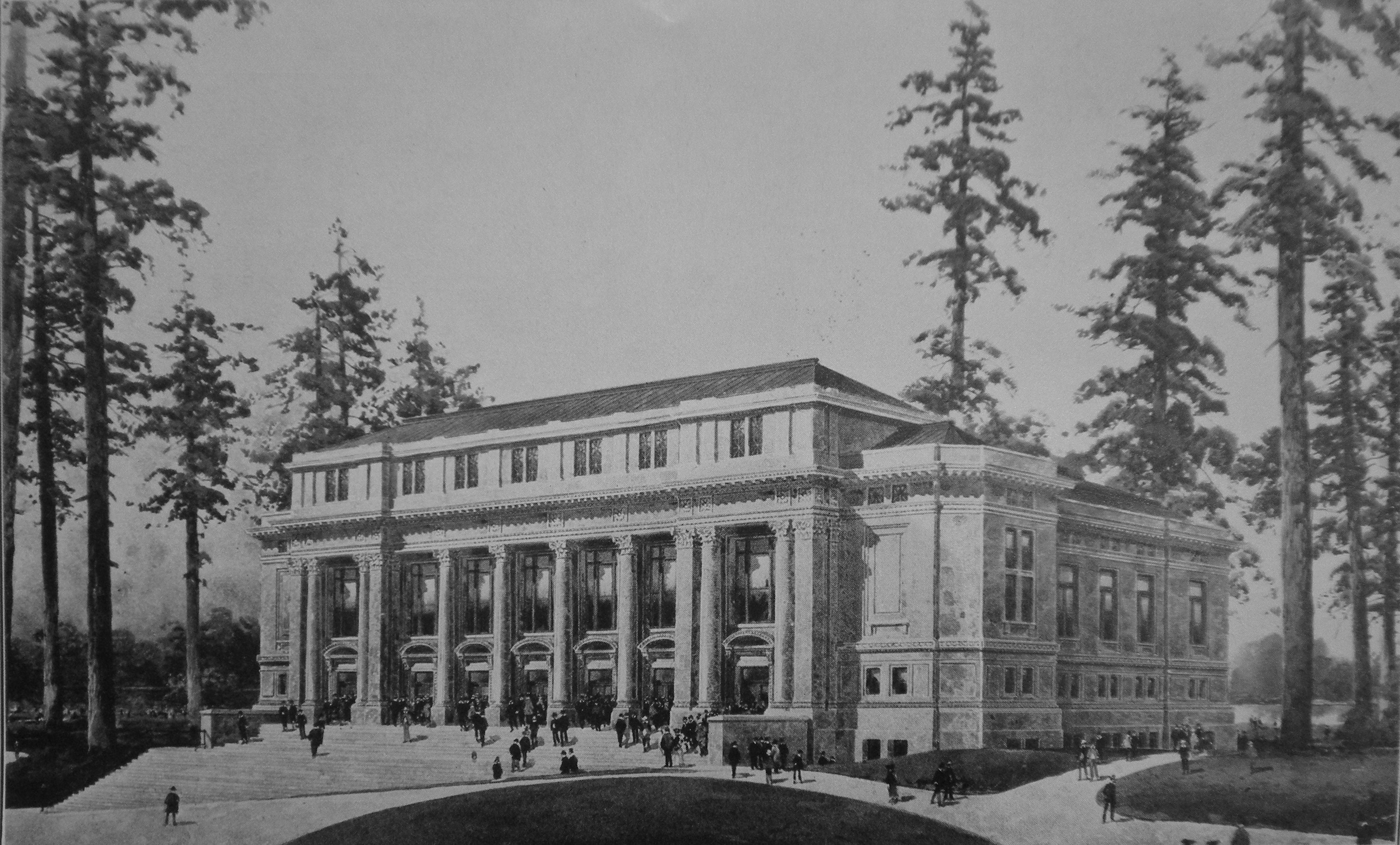
"Old" Meany Hall depicted at the time of the Alaska-Yukon-Pacific Exposition. Probably an artist's representation before actual construction.

The original building, known now as "Old" Meany Hall, was situated between Memorial Way and 15th Avenue, directly across from Suzzallo Library. It was one of several buildings constructed on campus for the 1909 Alaska-Yukon-Pacific Exposition. Auditorium Hall, as it was then known, was an athletic arena where boxing matches and other competitions were held. The architects for the original building were Howard & Galloway, and it was built for a cost of $181,000. From 1909 to 1965, Meany had the largest capacity of any building on campus with 2,600 seats. After the exposition, the hall was used for student assemblies and for music and drama performances.

The building was named for Professor Edmond S. Meany, a UW graduate and head of the history department, who was instrumental to the success of getting the exposition and many of the buildings on the UW campus. Because of Meany's dedication to the campus, The Daily student newspaper started an editorial campaign in 1909 to rename Auditorium Hall to Meany Hall, going so far as referring to the hall as "Meany Hall" in the news columns. The Board of Regents resisted the name because no other campus building had been named for a living person. Meany himself wanted the building to be named Seward Hall, after William H. Seward, the U.S. Secretary of State who bought Alaska from Russia in 1867. On May 1, 1914, the regents relented and the hall was officially renamed at a ceremony held to mark Edmond Meany and his wife's 25th wedding anniversary.

Before 1925, the University Book Store was housed in Meany Hall's basement. It was relocated following objections from the city fire marshal about lack of fire escapes and fire extinguishers.

In 1958, a $75,000 renovation improved the lighting and sound of the interior of Meany. The Daily reported that the interior of Meany, newly painted salmon pink, was "no longer staid and Victorian - it is almost futuristic with soft red-and-gray seats and ... salt-shaker lights suspended like mobiles from the roof." The 1958 renovation also included structural reinforcements, although engineers predicted that the Hall would eventually have to be brought down. Only seven years later in 1965, an earthquake in Seattle on April 29 rendered Meany Hall unsafe for occupation and it was condemned. Its demolition provided more opportunities for campus planners to open up space in the Central Plaza area, now known informally as Red Square. The Collegiate Gothic edifice of Suzzallo Library now became the main plaza's centerpiece.

It was not until 1974 that a new performing arts hall, costing $7,123,000, was built southeast of the former entrance. The architects for the new building were Kirk, Wallace, McKinley & Associates. The acoustician was Paul S. Veneklasen, who has some history in the design of Seattle Auditoria, such as the Seattle Center Opera House. In stark contrast to the Neo-classic façade of the old building, the new Meany Hall was built in the same contemporary style as the brick Odegaard Undergraduate Library, adjacent to the north.

In 1995, the Allen Center for the Visual Arts, a southern extension to the Henry Art Gallery, was built in old Meany Hall's former place.

Preceded by Sony Pictures Studios	Host of the Jeopardy! College Championship; Fall 2000	Succeeded by Pauley Pavilion
