= Charles Odegaard =

President of the University of Washington in 1958–1973

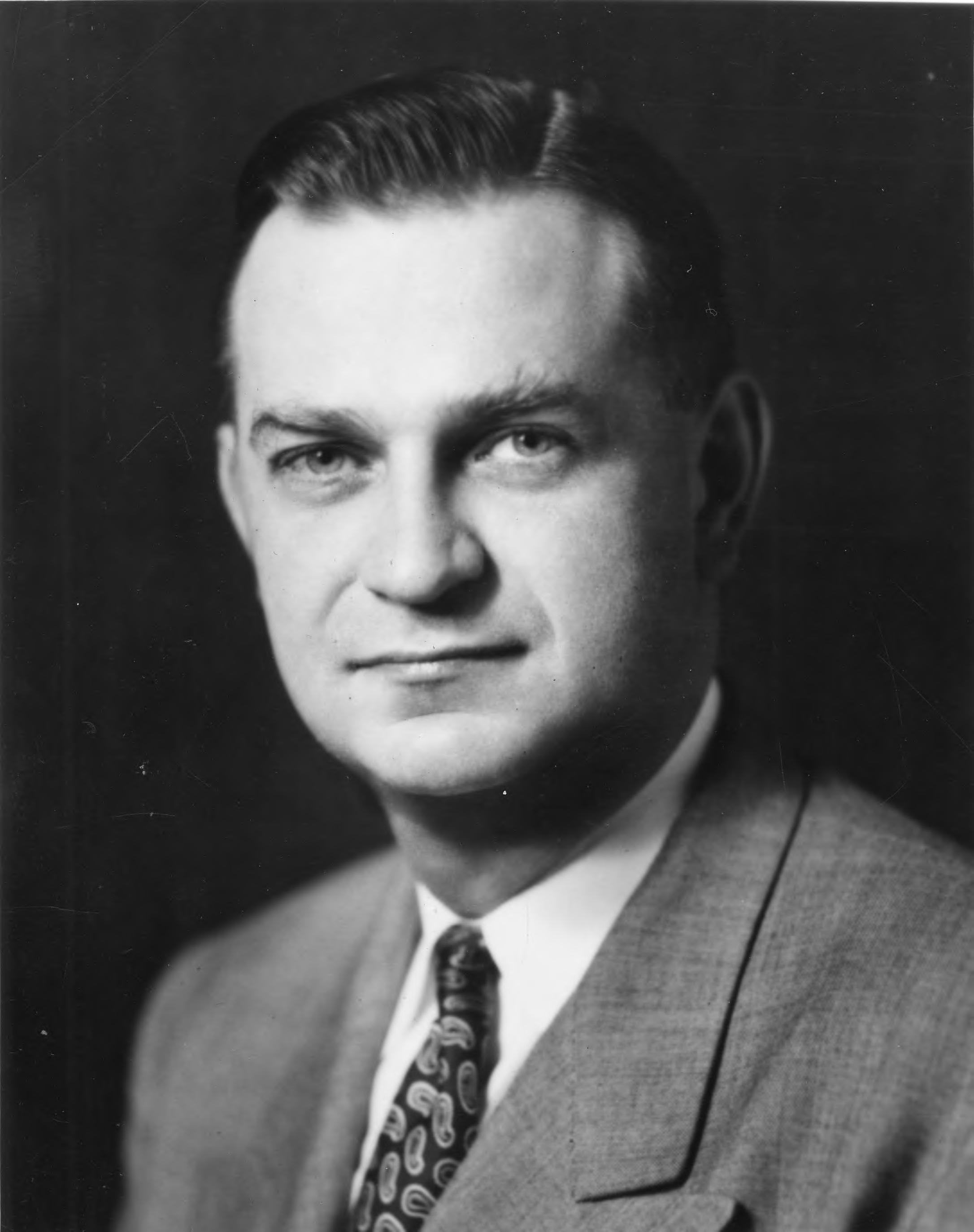
University of Michigan faculty portrait

Charles Edwin Odegaard (January 10, 1911 – November 14, 1999) was the 24th president of the University of Washington from 1958 to 1973. Odegaard is credited in transforming the University of Washington from an average state university to one among the top public universities in the United States.

== Background ==
Odegaard was born in 1911 in Chicago Heights, Illinois to Charles Alfred and Mary Cord Odegaard.

== Career ==
Odegaard taught history at the University of Illinois at Urbana-Champaign, and then took a leave of absence to serve in the Navy during World War II, earning the rank of lieutenant commander. Odegaard returned to academia, first teaching at the University of Illinois, then becoming the Executive Director of the American Council Of Learned Societies. In 1953 he became the Dean of Arts and Sciences at the University of Michigan.

In 1958, Odegaard accepted the presidency of the University of Washington and quickly made changes to remedy perceived complacency in the university's administration. Six years after Odegaard arrived, only three of the original fifteen deans remained. The university witnessed tremendous growth during Odegaard's tenure with the student population growing from 16,000 to 34,000, 35 new buildings (doubling the square footage of the university), increased investment in the medical school, instituted a vision of building a "community of scholars", and oversaw the growth of the operating budget from $37 million USD in 1958 to over $400 million USD in 1973.

== Personal life ==
In 1941 he married Elizabeth Jane Ketchum (1908-1980) in Chicago at the University of Chicago Chapel. Elizabeth Ketchum was the daughter of Milo Smith Ketchum, former Dean of the College of Engineering at Colorado, Pennsylvania, and Illinois, and Mary Esther Beatty Ketchum, who taught at the University of Illinois. Charles and Elizabeth Odegaard had one daughter, Mary Ann Odegaard. Odegaard died in his sleep of heart failure in 1999 at the age of 88, after several years of failing health.

== Legacy ==
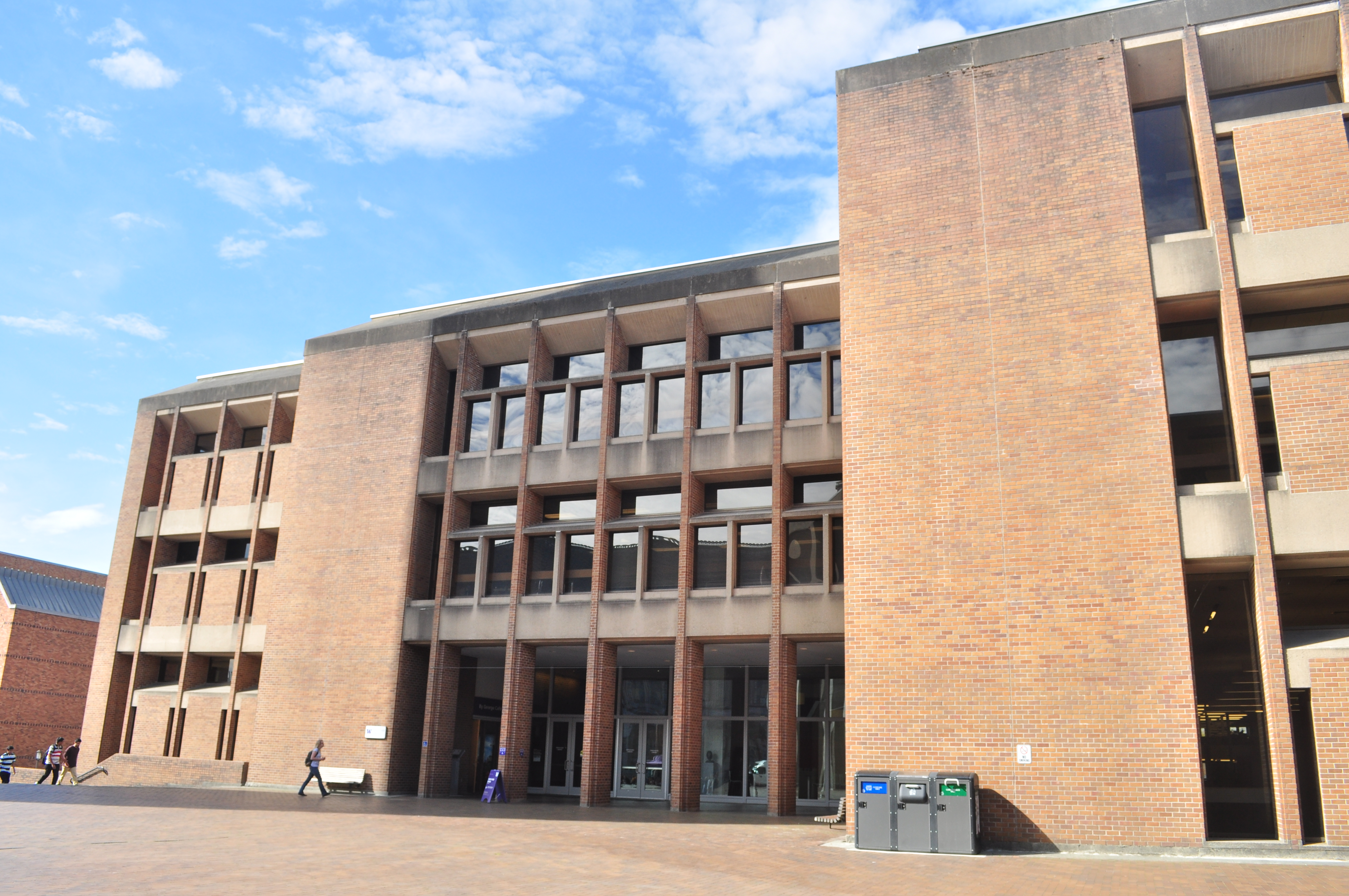
Odegaard Undergraduate Library at the University of Washington

- Odegaard Undergraduate Library, the undergraduate library at the University of Washington is named in his honor.
- The Charles E. Odegaard Award was established at the University of Washington on behalf of diversity at the university.
- Blake Island Marine State Park has a plaque dedicating the island to him, despite the islands history.
- He was co-defendant in US Supreme Court case DeFunis v. Odegaard.

== Bibliography ==
- Odegaard, Charles E. (2000). A Pilgrimage Through Universities. Seattle, WA: University of Washington Press. p. 203. ISBN 978-0-295-97760-7.

== Archives ==
- Lauren R. Donaldson papers. 1906-1994. 29 cubic feet (42 boxes). At the University of Washington Libraries Special Collections.
- Charles M. Gates papers. 1881-1963. 24.84 cubic feet. At the University of Washington Libraries Special Collections.
