= Benson Hall =

Building on the University of Washington campus

Coordinates: 47°39′11″N 122°18′34″W

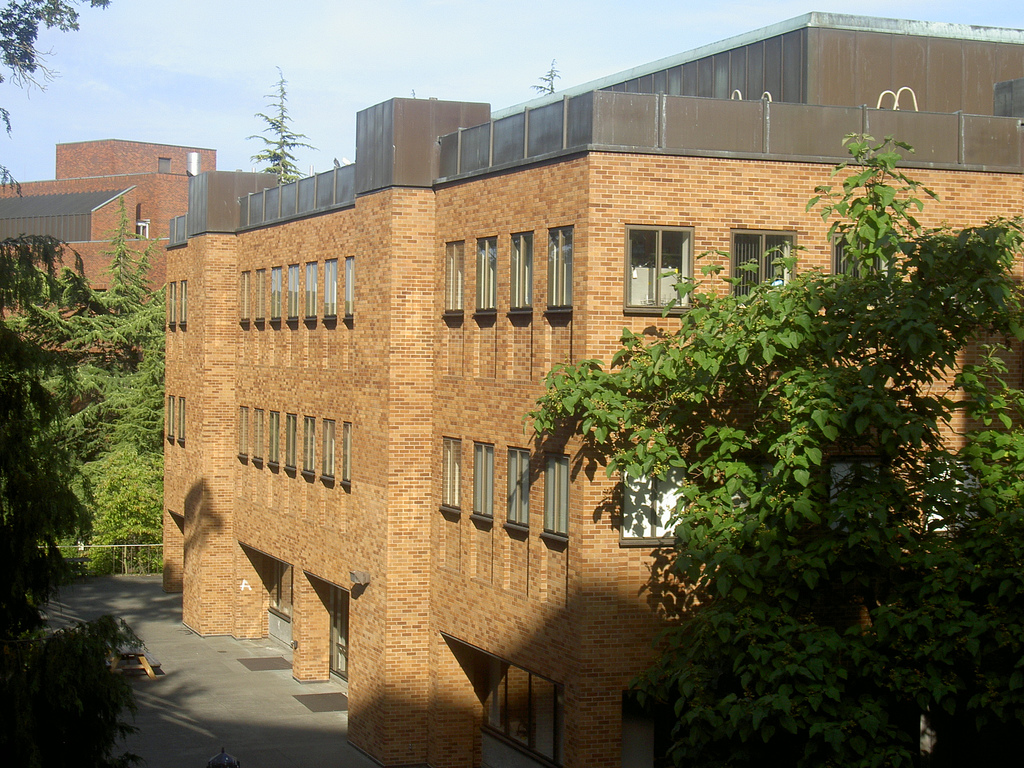
Benson Hall

Benson Hall is a building in the University of Washington campus. It is home to the chemical engineering department. The building was named after Henry K. Benson, a faculty member from 1904 to 1954. During this time, he held the position of Chair of Chemistry and Chemical Engineering. Leonard William Bindon and John LeBaron Wright designed Benson Hall.

Benson Hall is located along Stevens Way, on the south side of the University of Washington campus. It is southwest of Bagley Hall, southeast of the Chemistry Library, and northwest of the Medicinal Herb Garden.

The building itself consists of three above ground floors and a basement. The main floor is home to a computer lab, the main office, a student lounge, a lobby, a research lab, and two classrooms. The second and third floors hold faculty offices, grad student offices, a classroom, and many research laboratories. The basement contains the remainder of the graduate student offices, research laboratories, and the Unit operations lab.

Benson Hall is home to the University of Washington student chapter of the American Institute of Chemical Engineers (UW AIChE). The UW AIChE chapter is responsible for a variety of student events on campus.

== Chemical engineering coursework ==
The chemical engineering program at the University of Washington generally involves two years of coursework as well as two years of prerequisites prior to admission to the program.

Chemical Engineering classes are structured such that the entire class progresses together over the course of final two years, beginning with Material and Energy Balances, and finishing with Process Design II.
