= Henry Suzzallo =

President of the University of Washington

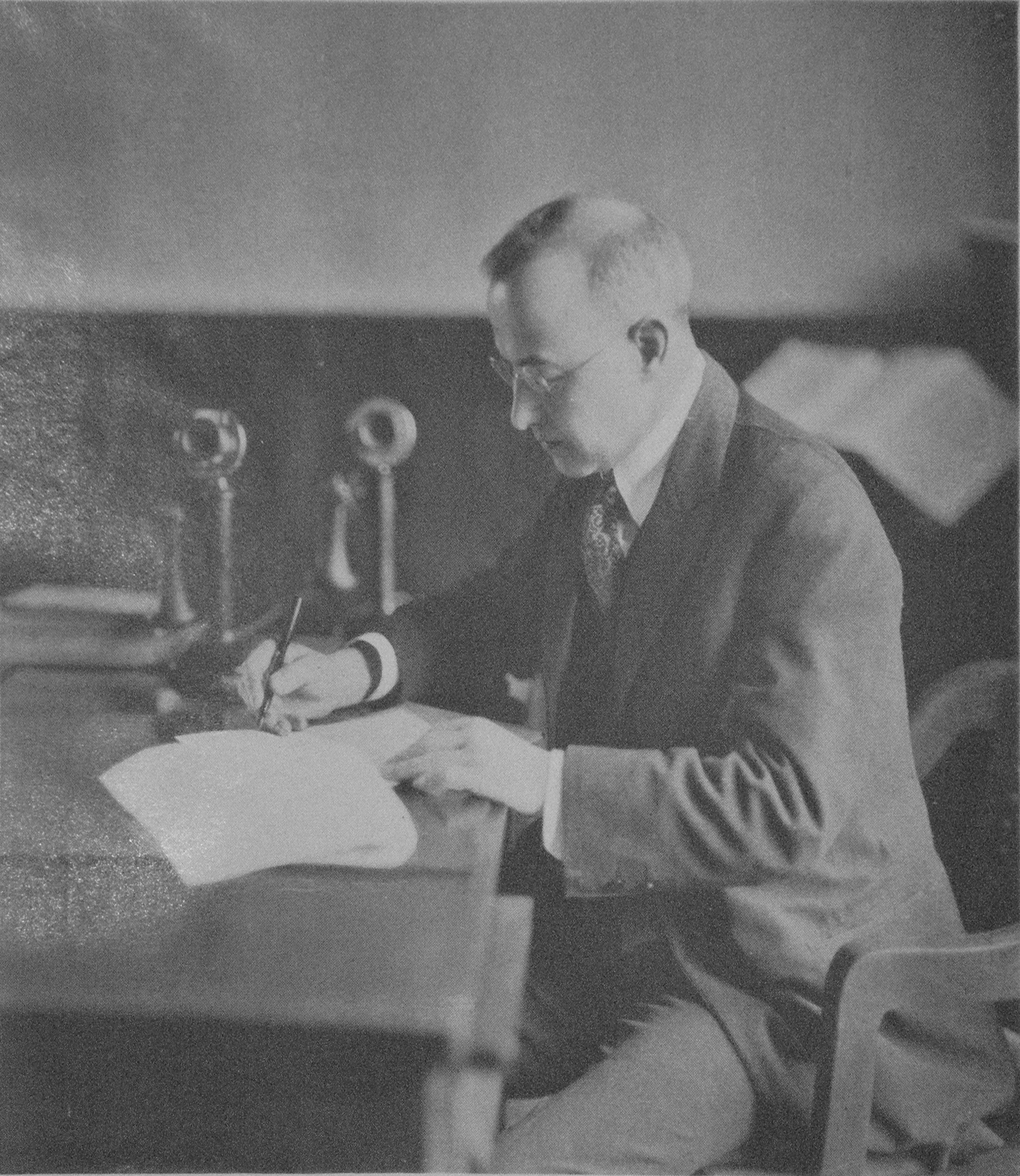
Henry Suzzallo c. 1921

Henry Suzzallo (August 22, 1875 – September 25, 1933) was the 16th president of the University of Washington from 1915 to 1926. He later served as director of the National Advisory Committee on Education and president of the Carnegie Foundation for the Advancement of Teaching.

== Biography ==
Of Venetian descent, Suzzallo was born in San Jose, California, just after his parents' emigration from the Dalmatia region of the Austrian Empire. The surname Suzzallo, whose name in the old country had been Zucalo, is also common in Herzegovina and Montenegro. Poor health in his youth resulted in mediocre grades during his primary and secondary education. He graduated from the California State Normal School in San Jose (now San José State University), and later Stanford University in 1899. He eventually attended Columbia University Teachers College for graduate school, where he got his master's degree in 1902 and his Ph.D. in 1905. His focus was educational sociology. He was principal of an elementary school in Alameda, California, deputy superintendent of city schools in San Francisco, professor of education at San Jose State and Stanford, and professor of educational sociology at Columbia, before becoming president of the University of Washington in 1915.

"It was there (Columbia) that the Washington regents found him (Suzzallo) in 1915, and he returned to the coast of his birth gladly. The University of Pittsburgh tried to lure him east again in 1919, offering to double his salary. He refused. The Carnegie Foundation, the National Research Council, the English Speaking Union, the Hall of Fame, the Scouts, the International Institute of the University of Heidelberg, and a dozen or so literary, sociological, and scientific societies soon made inroads on his time, recognizing him for a man of creditable character and intelligence; hearing of him from his many friends as one in whom force combined with charm, integrity with flexibility of manner. His prime attention, however, he devoted to the institution that was now in his charge" (Time magazine, October 18, 1926).

Suzzallo, along with two other University of Washington faculty members, Richard Frederick Scholz (History Professor - predicted the rise of fascism in Europe) and Dr. Robert Max Garrett (English Professor - humanitarian), became an honorary member and advisor of the Phi Lambda chapter of the Zeta Psi fraternity of North America upon its charter in December 1920. Suzzallo's involvement with the Phi Lambda chapter of Zeta Psi is unusual because he did not become a member until after he was President of the University of Washington.

While at the University of Washington, Suzzallo fired head football coach Gil Dobie due to a scandal about players and testing irregularities. Although Dobie had a remarkable record of 58-0-3, Suzzallo fired him because he sided with the players.

During World War I, Suzzallo served as a chairman of the State Board of Defense, an advisor to the War Labor Board, and as a member of the Labor Industries Board. A labor dispute at the time concerned the eight hour workday in the logging and lumber industry, which Suzzallo favored and helped enact. Suzzallo's actions enraged lumberman Roland H. Hartley, who was elected governor in 1924. In 1926, Hartley removed five of the seven members of the University of Washington's Board of Regents and replaced them with his own appointees. The new board shortly thereafter announced Suzzallo's "leave of absence" for no apparent reason. Enraged students threatened to strike, but were compelled not to upon Suzzallo's request.

After his dismissal from the University of Washington, Suzzallo became associated with the Carnegie Foundation for the Advancement of Teaching, which he became president of in 1930. Suzzallo died in Seattle, Washington in 1933. Suzzallo Library, the University of Washington's central library, is named in honor of him.
