= Theodor Jacobsen Observatory =

Observatory in Washington state, US

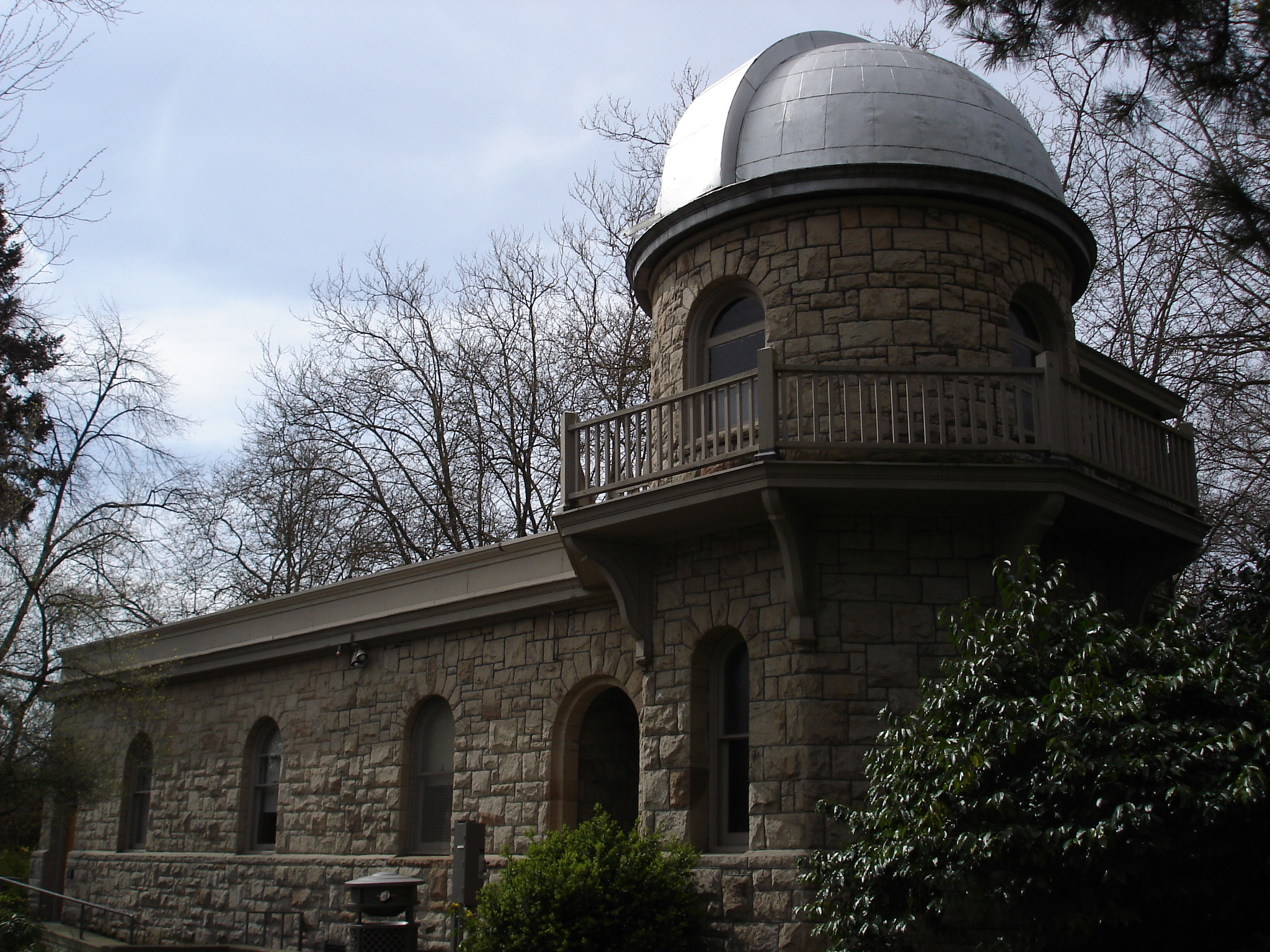
- Theodor Jacobsen Observatory (2006)
- Organization: University of Washington
- Location: Seattle, Washington, United States
- Coordinates: 47.660432°N 122.3092°W
- Established: 1895
- Website: astro.washington.edu/jacobsen-observatory

Telescopes
- Warner & Swasey: 6" refractor
- Bamberg: transit
- Related media on Commons

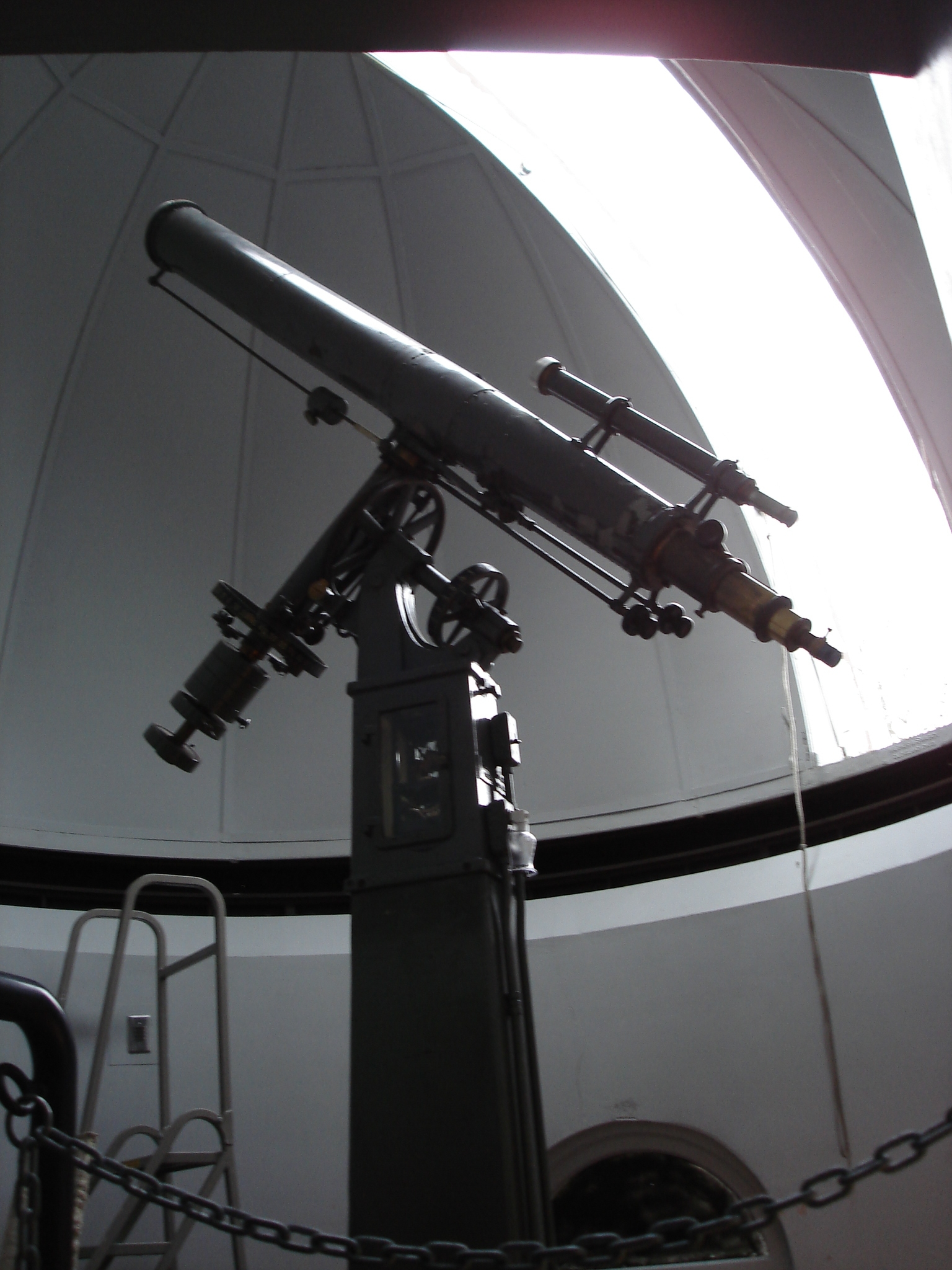
Inside the dome

The Theodor Jacobsen Observatory (TJO) is the on-campus observatory of the University of Washington. Built in 1895, it is the second oldest building on campus and was constructed using the remaining Tenino sandstone blocks from Denny Hall, the oldest and first building on campus. The refracting telescope, enclosed within the dome, has a six-inch Brashear objective lens of a Warner & Swasey equatorial mount. The observatory also includes a transit room on the west side, and a 45-seat classroom that was built as an addition in 1912, on the south side.

Today, the observatory is primarily used for public outreach and is run jointly by the UW Department on Astronomy and the Seattle Astronomical Society. Every first and third Tuesday between April and September the observatory is open to the public.

The observatory is listed on the State Register on Historical Buildings.

Information on the original design and building of the observatory by Prof. Joseph Marion Taylor may be found on the University Washington Astronomy Department website and other sources.

== See also ==
- List of observatories
