= University of Washington Planetarium =

Planetarium

Coordinates: 47°39′10″N 122°18′40″W

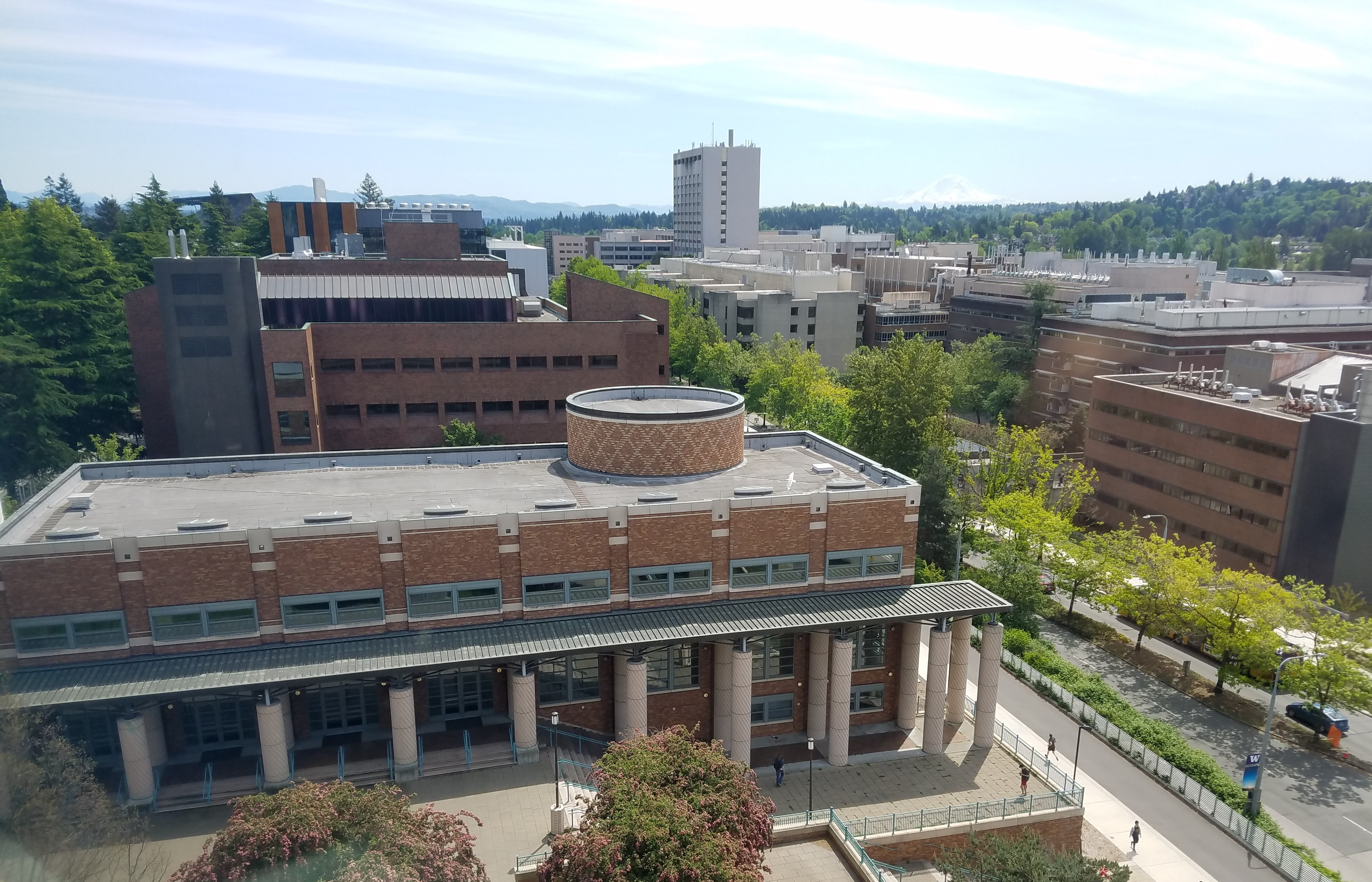
UW Physics Astronomy Auditorium. The Planetarium is located in the round structure on the roof of the building

The University of Washington Planetarium is an active planetarium located in the Physics/Astronomy Auditorium on the University of Washington campus in Seattle, WA. The dome is 30 feet in diameter and utilizes six digital projectors to create an interactive display using the Worldwide Telescope planetarium software.

== History ==
The planetarium was constructed in the Physics/Astronomy Auditorium in 1994. It initially featured a Minolta MS-8 starball projector, but in 2009, the University of Washington partnered with the Microsoft Research division to bring the WorldWide Telescope software to the planetarium. The upgrade was completed in 2011, and the transition from physical to digital technology gave the planetarium "a rich and truly interactive experience," according to team member Jonathan Fay at the 2010 Astronomical Society of the Pacific in Boulder, CO. The projector configuration creates an 8-million pixel digital display.

== Mobile Planetarium ==
The University of Washington also constructed a mobile planetarium available to faculty and students which is used as an outreach tool to bring astronomy to schools in the Seattle area. The university purchased a Go-Dome mobile planetarium dome and a fish-eye projection lens. Philip Rosenfield, an NSF Astronomy and Astrophysics Fellow at the Center for Astrophysics | Harvard & Smithsonian, wrote a guide for constructing a mobile planetarium with based on the construction of the University of Washington mobile planetarium titled "The University of Washington Mobile Planetarium Do-it-Yourself Guide."
