= Suzzallo Library =

Library at the University of Washington

Coordinates: 47.6557°N 122.3084°W

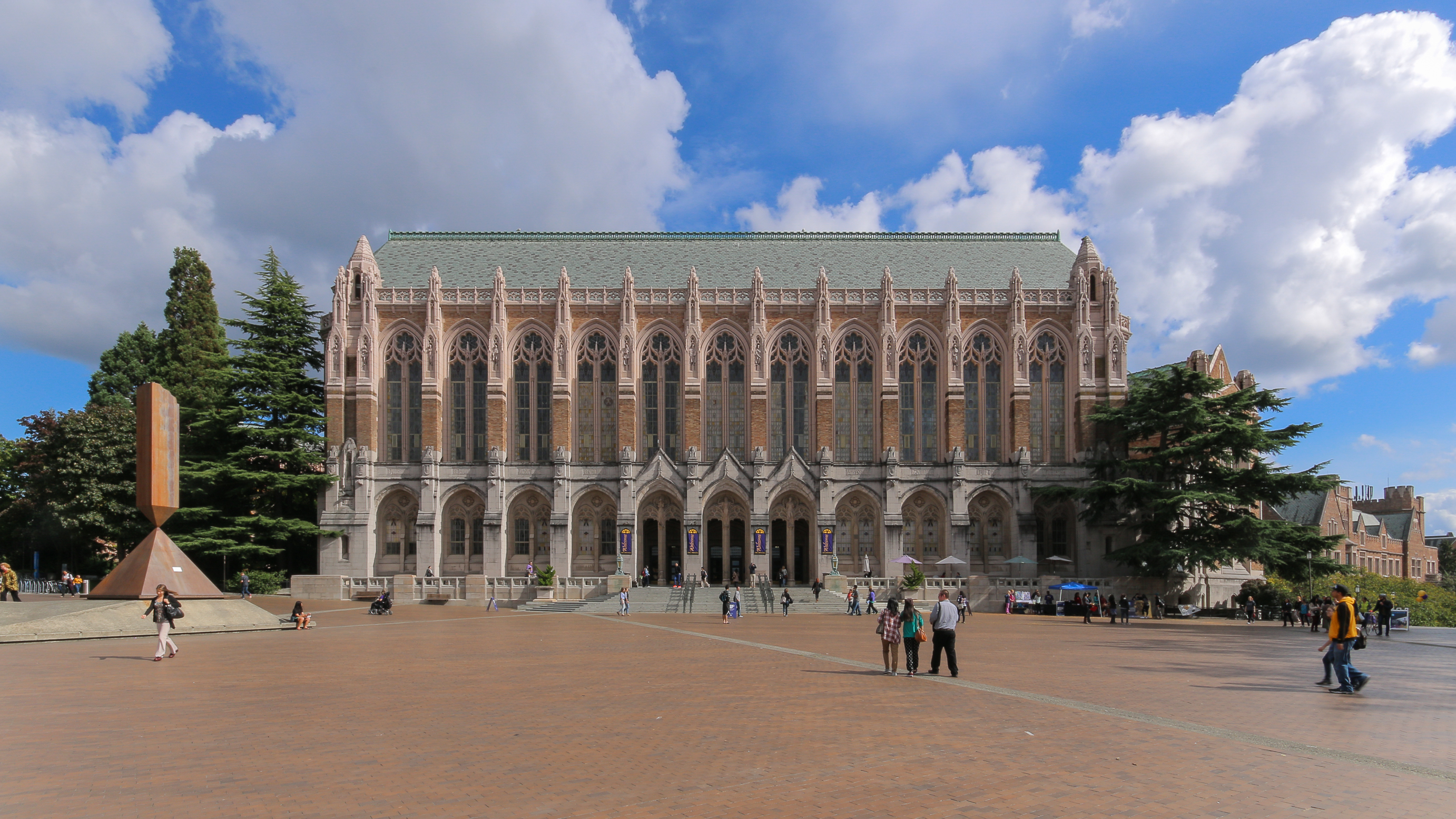
- Interactive map of the Suzzallo Library area

General information
- Architectural style: Collegiate Gothic
- Location: Seattle, Washington, United States of America
- Construction started: 1926
- Completed: 1963
- Renovated: 2000
- Client: University of Washington

Design and construction
- Architects: Charles H. Bebb, Carl F. Gould

Website
- Suzzallo & Allen Libraries

Suzzallo Library is the central library of the University of Washington in Seattle, and perhaps the most recognizable building on campus. It is named for Henry Suzzallo, who was president of the University of Washington until he stepped down in 1926, the same year the first phase of the library's construction was completed. The library was renamed for him after his death in 1933.

== Architecture ==
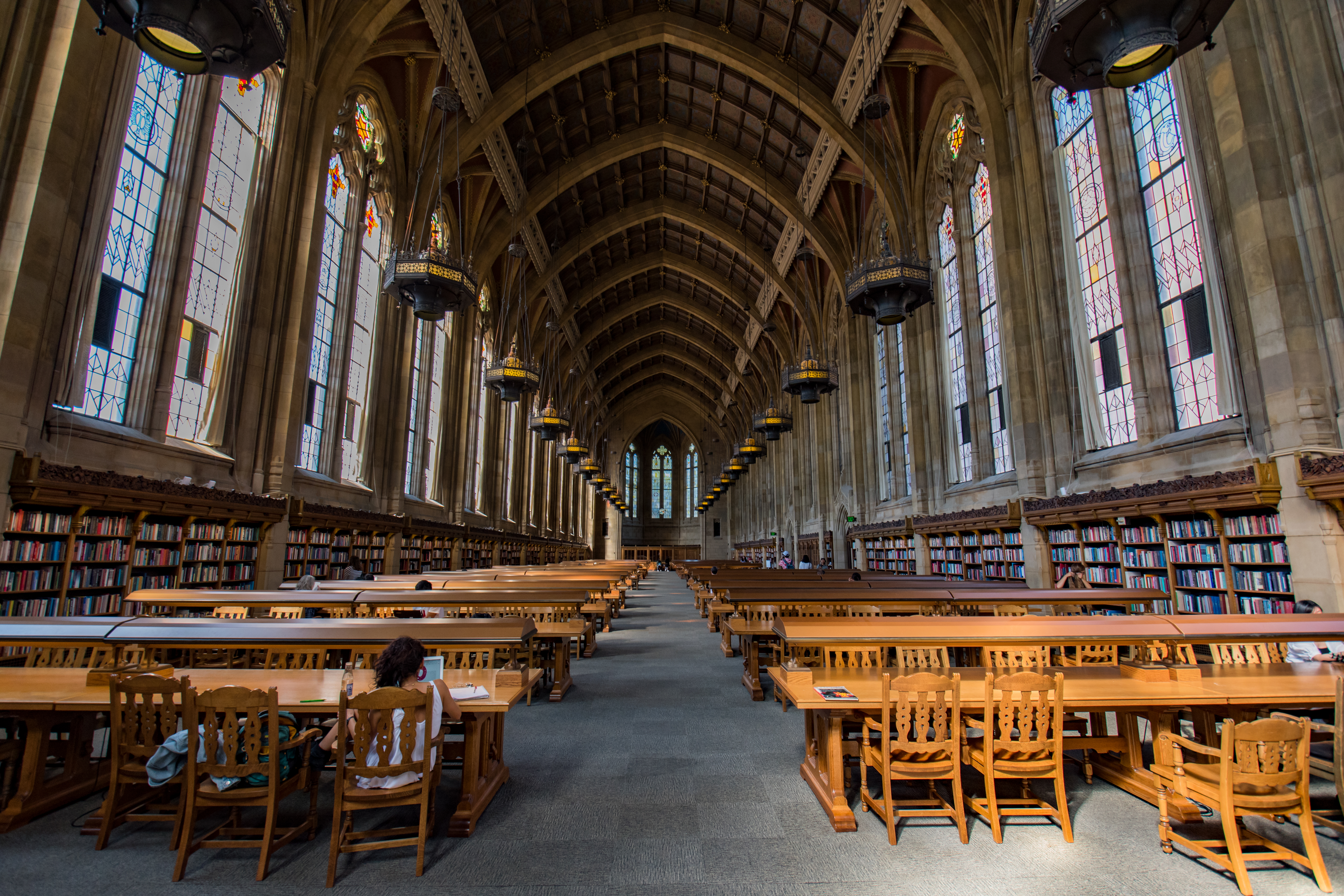
Graduate Reading Room in the Suzzallo Library

The library's original architects, Charles H. Bebb and Carl F. Gould, called for three structures built in Collegiate Gothic style and arranged in a roughly equilateral triangle with a bell tower in the center. The proposed 300-foot (91 m) bell tower, however, was never built. A terra cotta bas relief of this plan, with the bell tower, can still be found on the wall outside the northeast entrance to Smith Hall.

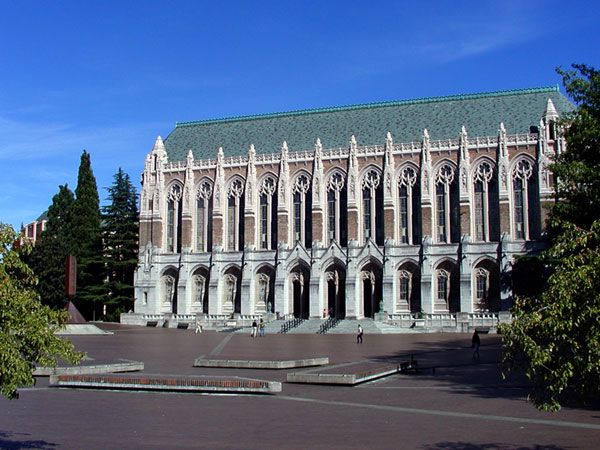
Suzzallo Library, looking east across Red Square

The first phase, completed 1926, built the wing that forms the west face of the triangle. Its façade dominates the eastern side of the university's Central Plaza, better known as Red Square. The south wing, the second phase of construction, was completed in 1935. Part of this second phase added a floor between the first and second floors of the original building, and the curving Grand Staircase on either side of what was formerly a rotunda. The original plans for the third wing of the library, completed in 1963, were extensively revised, as by this time the university had largely moved away from its earlier architectural style and had adopted instead modernist concrete and glass forms. A fourth and final addition was completed in 1990 with the Kenneth S. Allen Library wing, named for the father of Microsoft co-founder Paul Allen; the elder Allen was an associate director of the university library system from 1960 to 1982. Between the years 2000 and 2002, Suzzallo Library underwent extensive retrofitting to strengthen the structure's integrity as a precaution against the effects of an earthquake. It remained open to the public throughout the entire renovation process, although sections were closed for periods of time. While the 2001 Nisqually earthquake occurred during the renovation, the library only sustained minor damage as 60 percent of the interior seismic work was completed when it occurred.

The 250-foot (76 m) long, 52-foot (16 m) wide, 65-foot (20 m) high Graduate Reading Room (illustrated below) features cast-stone ashlar wall blocks and details, and oak bookcases topped with hand-carved friezes of native plants, under a painted and stenciled timber-vaulted ceiling. Tall leaded windows feature 35 foot stained glass panels reproducing Renaissance watermarks. On the oriels at each end of the room, painted world globes bear the names of European explorers. The Graduate Reading Room spans the entire third floor of the west front of the library. Its distinctive look, reminiscent of the great halls of Oxford and Cambridge colleges, is also said to have been inspired by Henry Suzzallo's stated belief that universities should be "cathedrals of learning."

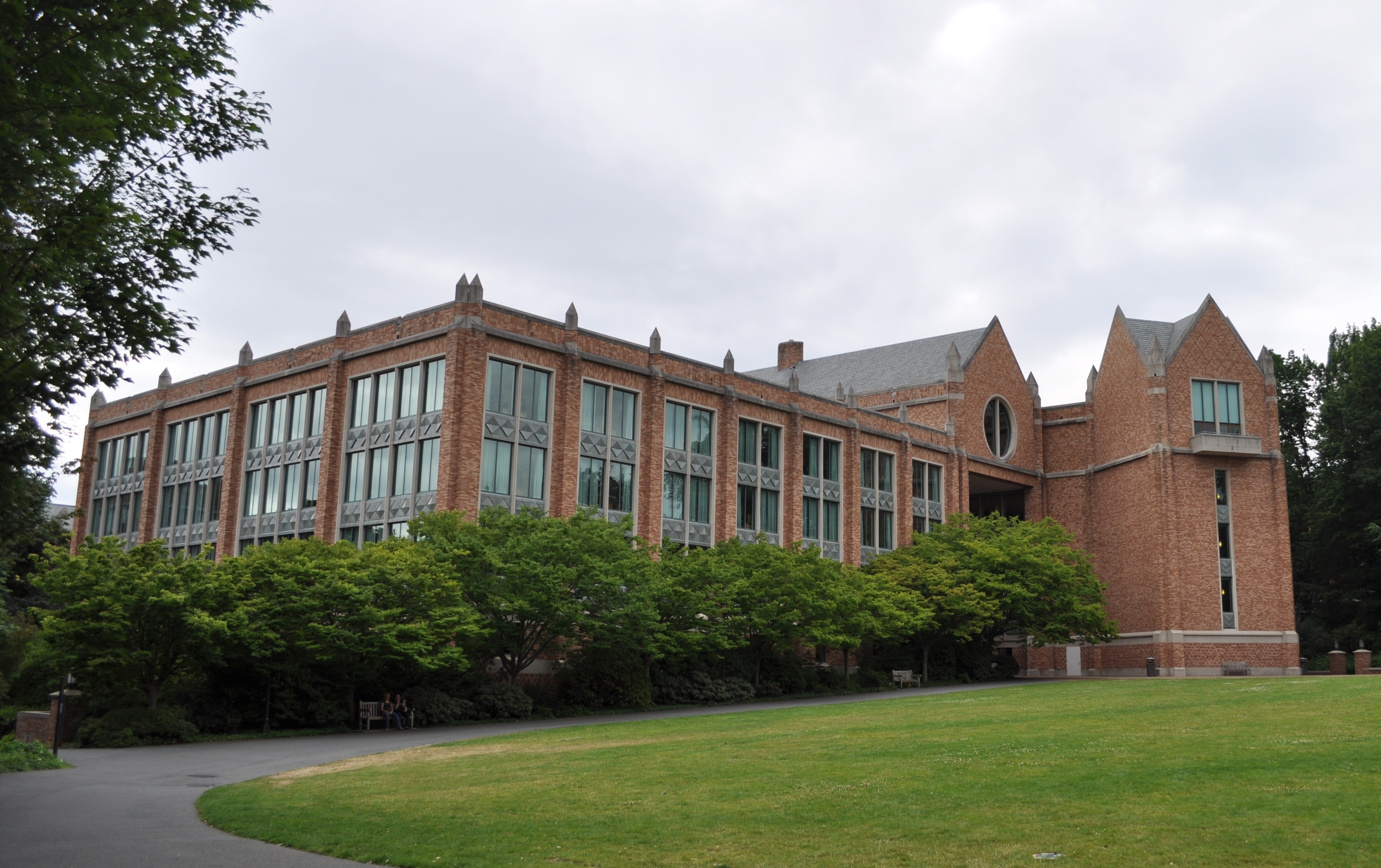
Allen Library

Adorning the exterior of the early wings are terra cotta sculptures by Allen Clark of influential thinkers and artists selected by the faculty. These include Moses, Louis Pasteur, Dante Alighieri, Shakespeare, Plato, Benjamin Franklin, Justinian I, Isaac Newton, Leonardo da Vinci, Galileo Galilei, Johann Wolfgang von Goethe, Herodotus, Adam Smith, Homer, Johann Gutenberg, Ludwig van Beethoven, Charles Darwin and Hugo Grotius. The front façade is also decorated with stone coats of arms from universities around the world, including Toronto, Louvain, Virginia, California, Yale, Heidelberg, Bologna, Oxford, Paris, Harvard, Stanford, Michigan, Uppsala, and Salamanca. Three cast stone figures representing "Thought", "Inspiration", and "Mastery" stand above the main entrance.

In 2025, the University of Washington started a seismic retrofit of Suzzallo Library as part of a campus-wide earthquake safety program. Construction began in June 2025 and was expected to finish by August 2026, at an estimated cost of $21.5 million.

== Artwork ==
The Allen wing hosts the Raven Brings Light to this House of Stories (ʔuʔəƛ̓cəb ʔə kaw̓qs tiʔəʔ sləx̌il dxʷʔal tiʔəʔ ʔalʔal ʔə syəyəhub in Lushootseed), an installation project by the Washington State Arts Commission, Art in Public Places Program. It is composed of sculpted ravens and crows in the lobby, the Table of Knowledge (a cedar table by Ron Hilbert Coy) with a presentation of International Symposium of Light (a book printed and bound by Mare Blocker), Broadsides (poems by J.T. Stewart) in the lobby and on the 2nd floor, Study Desks (two cawpets by Carl Chew) on the 1st and 3rd floors of the Allen wing, and a Things the Crows Left (a special collection).

== Library collection ==
Of the 6 million volumes that make up the University of Washington Libraries collection, approximately 1.6 million are housed in Suzzallo/Allen Library. Along with the Main Collection, Suzzallo/Allen Library also has a Children's Literature, Government Publications, Natural Sciences, and Periodicals collections. The Special Collections contains a Rare Book Collection with books printed before 1801. The Microforms/Newspapers collection is the largest collection of microform materials in any Association of Researches Library. Suzzallo Library also houses the main technical services units of the UW Libraries, including the Monographic Services Division and the Serials Services Division.

== In popular culture ==
The Suzzallo Library appears as a recurring setting in the 2018 virtual reality video game Moss. Several members of Polyarc, the game's developer, graduated from the University of Washington.

== See also ==
- University of Washington Libraries
