= Husky Union Building =

Building at the University of Washington

Coordinates: 47.655755°N 122.305401°W

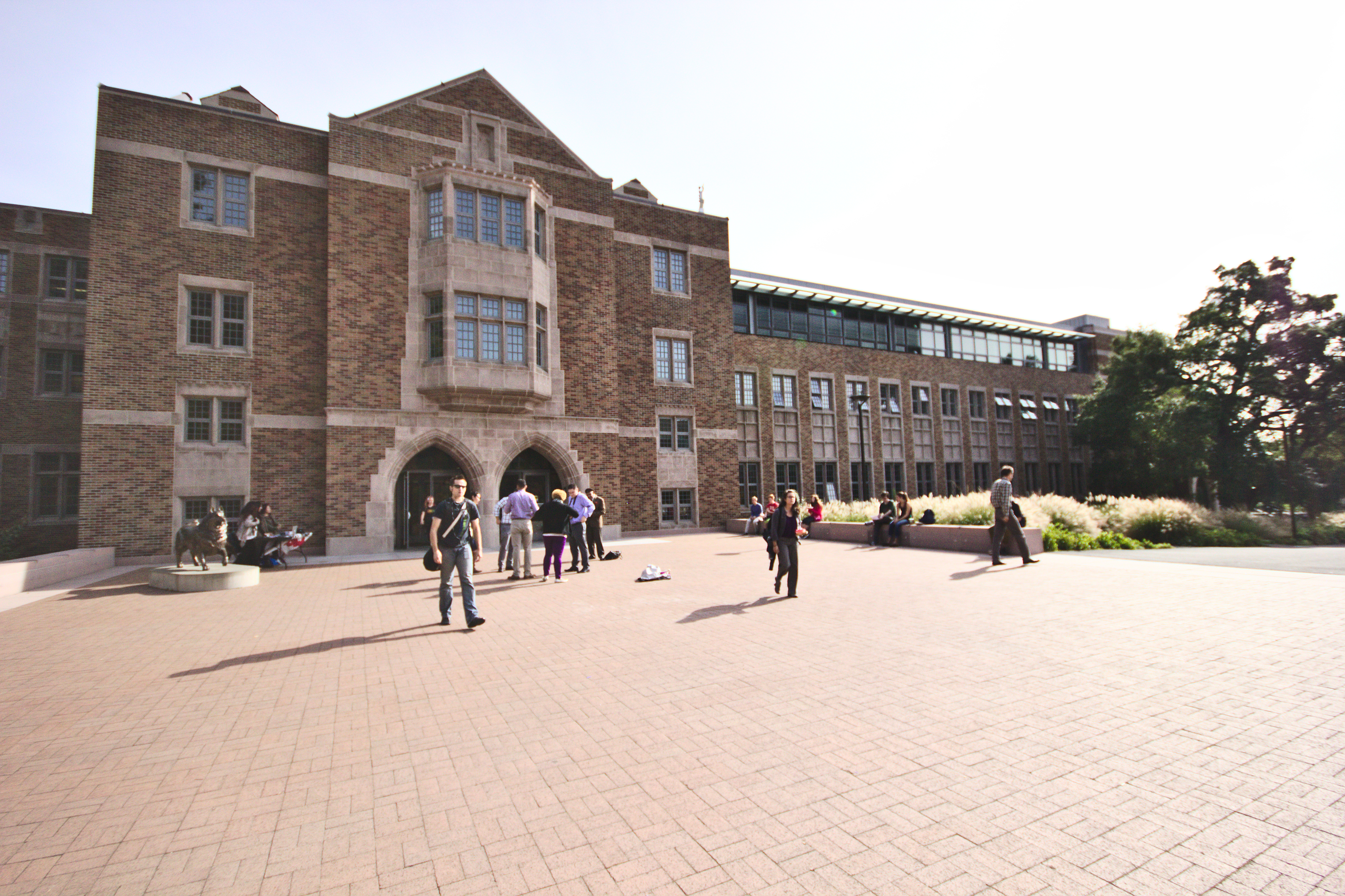
Northwest entrance to the Husky Union Building

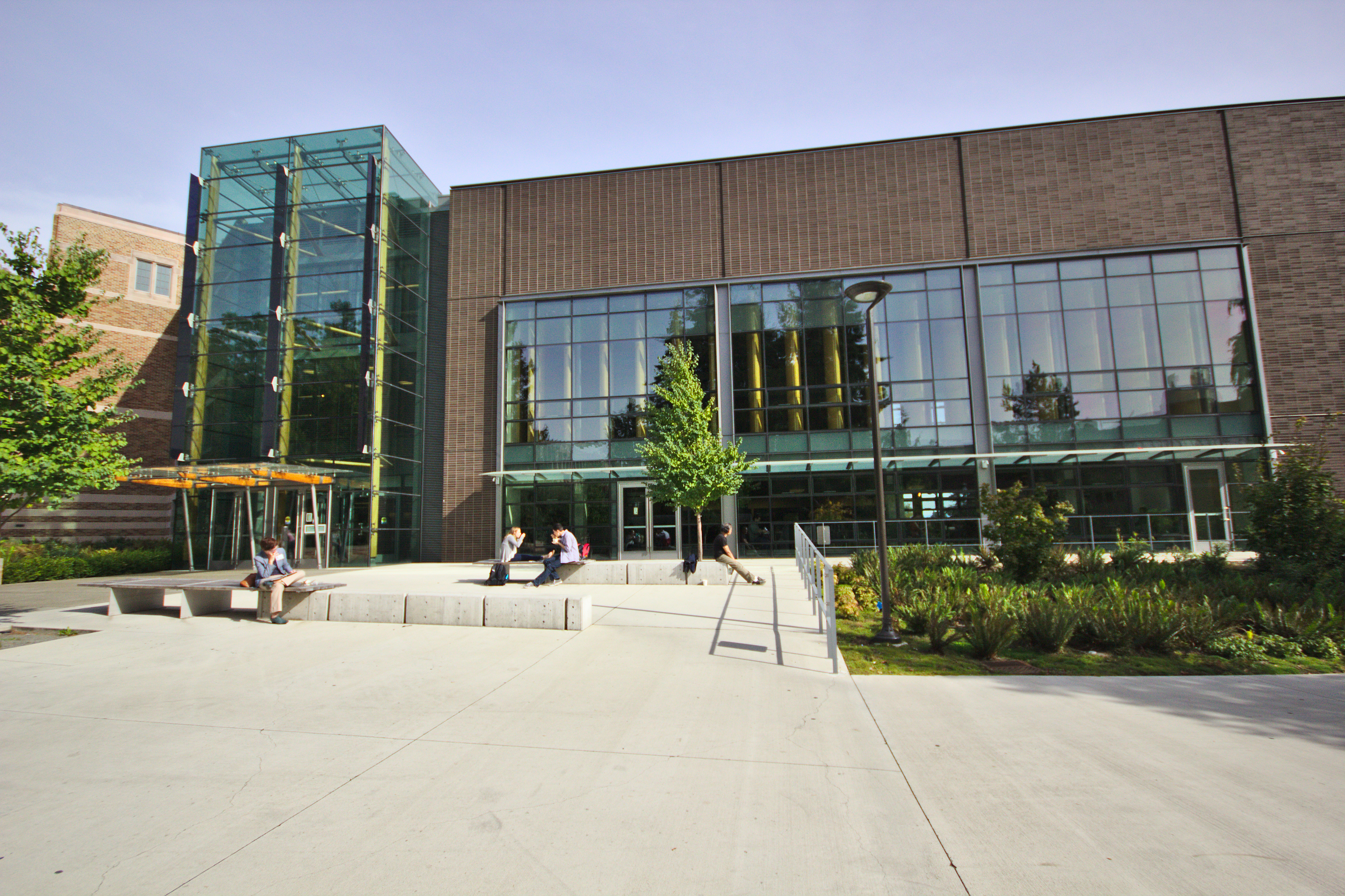
Southwest entrance to the Husky Union Building

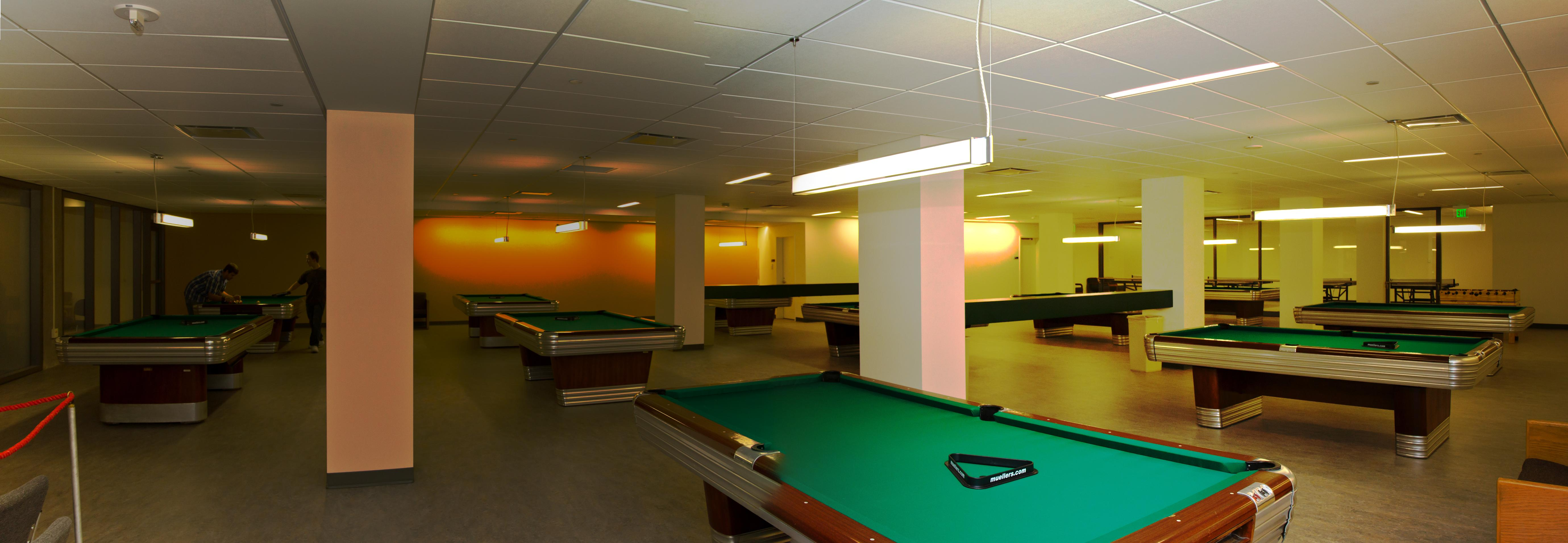
Pool room of HUB Games

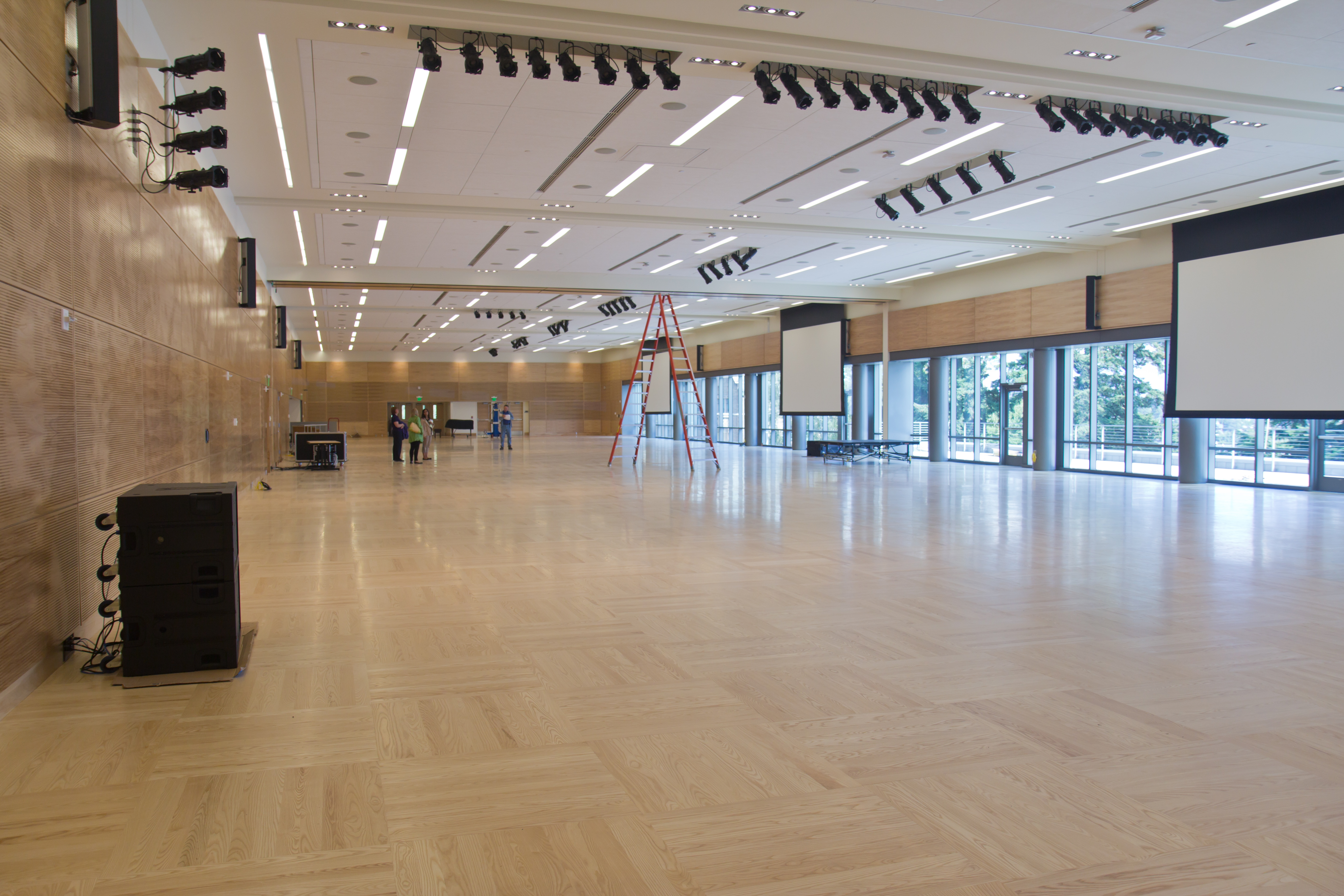
The HUB Ballroom

The Husky Union Building (The HUB) is a building at the University of Washington that is known as the center of campus as it functions as an event center, a place for student engagement, and a place intended to improve student experience.

== History and architecture ==
The HUB's original architecture contained elements of Collegiate Gothic Revival Style, but a more modern interior. It was transferred from the Associated Students of the University of Washington (ASUW) to the university administration in April 1962.

Talks of building a union building at the University of Washington began in 1919, after decades of planning, it was fully constructed and opened in October 1949. The original building was 71,000 square feet. Throughout time, many additions were made to the HUB; what student paper The Washington Daily would refer to as the building's name. In 1952, a ballroom, game room, deck, an expansion of the food service, and barbershop were all added to the building. In 1953, the University Book Store added a branch inside the building.

In the early 1970s, the hub underwent a major renovation that included one of the largest precast structural beams ever used in a structure. The firm Joyce Copeland Vaughan and Nordfors designed the renovation, the principal architect was Clayton R Joyce, a University of Washington graduate class of 58. The HUB now stands at 262,000 square feet. Construction began in July 2010 on another remodeling of the HUB. The Grand Opening of the new HUB took place in Fall 2012.

== Activities and event spaces ==
Within the HUB, there are variety of spaces to hold activities and events.

The lower floor hosts HUB Games, which is home to a bowling alley, an e-sports lounge, table tennis and pool tables, and other gaming consoles and board games. The HUB also contains the Husky Den Food Court, a dining hall which contains a variety of food options. Some of the notable restaurants in the food court include: Ace Sushi, DUB Street Burgers, Firecracker, Motosurf and Pagliacci Pizza. In addition, many other services are hosted at the HUB, such as an information desk and a University Book Store branch. One notable trait about many of the office rooms at the HUB is that they are hosts to specific student groups and services available to registered student organizations (RSO) or to the general student population. These rooms include the Q Center, an office for Greek Life, and a meditation room. Until 2022, the HUB also hosted Scissor's Edge, a salon and styling shop. Another notable space to hold events in is the HUB Ballroom, which fills almost 14,000 square feet.
