= Gelatiamo =

Italian cafe in Seattle, Washington, U.S.

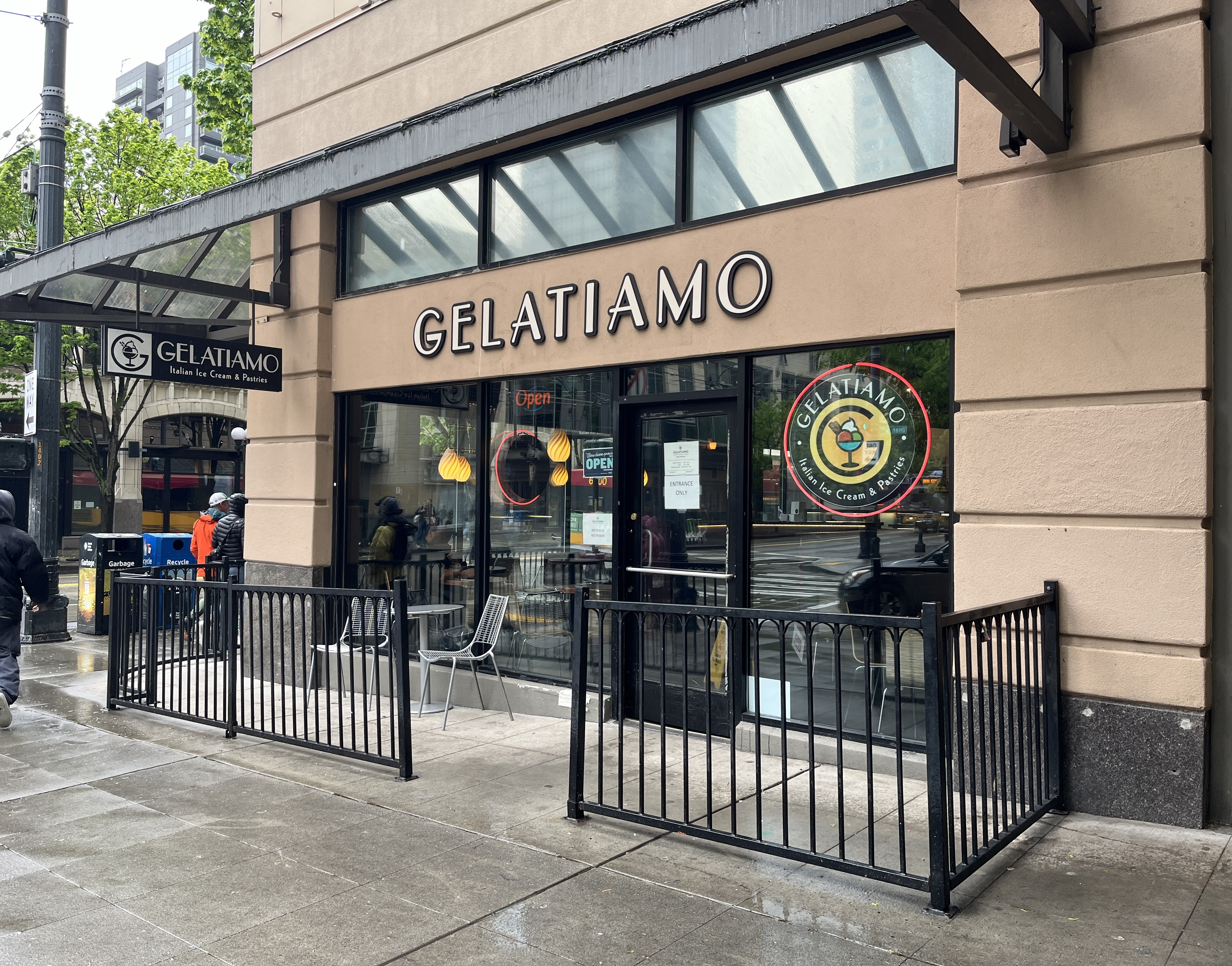
- The cafe's exterior, 2024
- Interactive map of Gelatiamo

Restaurant information
- Established: 1996
- Owners: Maria Coassin; Skyler Locatelli
- Location: 1400 Third Avenue, Seattle, King, Washington, 98101, United States
- Coordinates: 47°36′32″N 122°20′13″W

Gelatiamo is a gelato shop in Seattle, in the U.S. state of Washington. The business has operated in downtown Seattle since 1996.

== Description ==
Gelatiamo is an Italian cafe at the intersection of Union and Third Avenue in downtown Seattle. The Seattle Times has described the business as an ice cream and pastry shop. Among gelato flavors are salted hazelnut caramel, chocolate, and coconut. In addition to gelato and pastries, the menu includes cookies and cakes such as the Diplomatica, a sponge cake with rum. Gelatiamo has also served biscotti, panettone, sandwiches, and espresso drinks. According to The Daily of the University of Washington, "Something else that makes this gelato unique is the tight quality control system."

== History ==
The business was established in 1996. Maria Coassin is the owner. In 2022, Coassin described an increase in crime and vandalism in the area in recent years.

Gelatiamo is served at Pagliacci Pizza locations.

== Reception ==
The Not for Tourists Guide to Seattle has called the pastries "tasty" and the gelato "heavenly". In 2006, Mark D. Fefer of Seattle Weekly said Gelatiamo was a "thriving" eatery "that any connoisseur will tell you [has] the city's best" gelato. Bradley Foster and Emma Banks included Gelatiamo in Thrillist's 2022 list of the city's fifteen best ice cream shops. In The Infatuation's 2023 overview of the city's best ice cream, Aimee Rizzo wrote, "This is the best gelato shop in Seattle, and the closest you’ll come to replicating what you ate on your trip to Rome last year. The flavors are all great, from stracciatella to rice—which tastes like the best rice pudding you’ve ever had, but even colder." Seattle Metropolitan has said the coconut gelato "is the most delicious embodiment of that flavor on the planet".

== See also ==
- List of Italian restaurants
