= Associated Students of the University of Washington =

Student Government at the University of Washington

ASUW
- Associated Students of the University of Washington
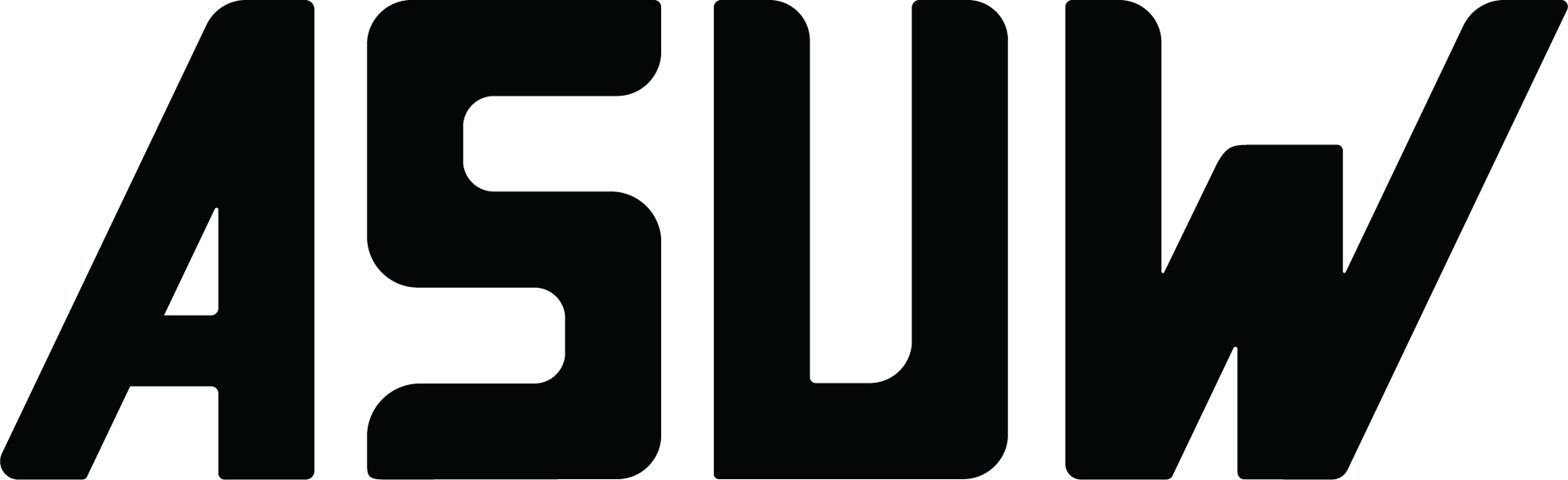
- ASUW Logo
- Formation: 18 April 1906
- Type: Student association
- Headquarters: HUB 121, 4001 E. Stevens Way NE, Seattle, WA 98195
- Location: Seattle, Washington, United States
- Members: 40000 (2023)
- President: Shantanu Adekar
- Vice President: Dylan Bianchi
- Senate Speaker: Avery Kirscht
- Main organ: Board of Directors
- Subsidiaries: Student Senate, Joint Commissions Committee, Office of Government Relations, Arts & Entertainment
- Affiliations: University of Washington
- Budget: $1.5 m USD
- Staff: 82
- Volunteers: 500
- Website: www.asuw.org
- Formerly called: The Student Assembly

The Associated Students of the University of Washington (ASUW) is the student association at the University of Washington. It is funded and supported by the University's Services and Activities Fee with which it provides services that directly and indirectly benefit student life. The ASUW consists of over 80 student employees and 500 volunteers, and the organization spends approximately $1.5 million annually to run events, lobby the legislature, and fund various Registered Student Organizations as they put on their own programs.

The ASUW Student Senate was established in 1994 as the legislative division of the Associated Students of the University of Washington. The Student Senate provides a broad-access forum for discussion of issues both on campus and abroad, serving as the voice of student opinion for those at UW. Currently, the ASUW Student Senate has a membership of over 150 senators representing students from on-campus, off-campus, and commuter residential communities, as well as several protected classes and organizations.

== History ==
The Student Assembly was founded in 1888 as the student government of the University of Washington. In 1900, the Student Assembly founded the University Bookstore, which became independent in 1932 due to ASUW’s insufficient budget.

The Student Assembly would only last until 1901, when the Associated Students of the University of Washington was created by the Athletic Association, the Oratorical Society, and other student groups.

The ASUW began on campus as the Board of Control which was later directly succeeded by the Board of Directors. The ASUW was formally incorporated in the State of Washington on April 18, 1906 by Chas. W. Hall, James W. Dootson, Mildred Boy, Helen M. Vaupell, Fred Hastings, J. Webster Hoover, and E. Rex Smith.

In 1942, ASUW created a Student Union Building Trust Fund for what would become the Husky Union Building. In 1962, ASUW lost control of Intercollegiate Athletics, when it became an independent department of UW.

The Graduate and Professional Student Senate broke off from the ASUW in 1967, evolving from the Joint Committee on Graduate Programming created in 1965, in order to directly represent graduate student interests. In 1968, ASUW would launch the experimental college and the course evaluation catalog, two major initiatives which were later discontinued.

The Minority Affairs Commission was established in 1971 to represent ethnic minorities on campus, bringing together the Black Student Union, the Women's Action Commission, and more. This was renamed into the Intercultural Commission in 1980, though funding was withdrawn the same year, and it was soon reformed into six commissions, representing African-Americans, Asians, Latinos, women, the LGBT community, and Native Americans, respectively. Today, there are nine diversity commissions.

As demand for a larger platform for advocacy developed alongside a growing student population, the ASUW Student Senate was established in 1994 as a division of the Associated Students of the University of Washington. Later, in 2000, the Board of Control was renamed the Board of Directors, reflecting the final change into the current form of the Associated Students of the University of Washington.

== Board of Directors ==
The ASUW Board of Directors is elected every school year on the fourth week of spring quarter and consists of 8 elected officials and 3 hired, ex-officio members.

=== Current Members of the Board of Directors (2026-2027) ===
- President - Shantanu Adekar
- Vice President - Dylan Bianchi
- Finance & Budget Director - Josue Villalobos
- Personnel Director - Jenny Suwanchote
- Communications Director - Riya Dhariwal
- Director of University Affairs - Kitana Ludwig
- Director of Internal Policy - Raagini Ganesh
- Director of Diversity Efforts - Carlos Hugo Ladron de Guevara
- Director of Campus Partnerships - Caroline Huguely
- Director of Programming - Aisha Rana
- Director of Community Relations - Simon Thompson
- ASUW Student Senate Representative - Avery Kirscht
- GPSS Representative - Zoe Love

=== Duties of the Board of Directors ===
==== President ====
The President is the Chief Executive Officer (CEO) of the Association and serves as the chair of the Board of Directors. They are responsible for overseeing various aspects of the ASUW's operations, including coordinating internal operations with the Vice President, participating in essential University committees, and ensuring effective student participation in governance. Additionally, the President serves as the official spokesperson of the ASUW, representing the organization in campus, community, and inter-school relationships. They are also involved in political lobbying efforts, ensuring open communication with relevant stakeholders, and overseeing various committees and liaisons. The President represents the ASUW to University of Washington administration through sitting as an ex-officio member on the UW Board of Regents and UW Faculty Senate. The President also ensures inter-campus collaboration amongst UW’s three campuses and sits on the Tri-Campus Student Advisory Board. The position is elected by instant runoff voting (IRV) in the fourth week of spring quarter.

==== Vice President ====
The Vice President serves as a voting member of the Board of Directors. The Vice President is the Chief Operating Officer (COO) of the Association and chairs the Executive Advisory Committee. They oversee ASUW strategic planning and goal setting. In their capacity of COO, the Vice President serves as the internal supervisor of all ASUW employees through oversight of the Personnel Director’s administration of the Personnel Policy; quarterly reviews of all employees; assistance of the Finance and Budget Director in entity budget request and revision forms; and assistance of the Office of Communications Director in the creation and publication of the annual ASUW report. Additionally, the Vice President serves as the liaison between ASUW and the Student Activities Office and appoints student representatives to various committees. They also facilitate all staff meetings and ensure smooth organization-wide transitions at the end of their term. In the President's absence, resignation, or forfeiture of office, the Vice President administers the duties of the President. The position is elected by IRV voting in the fourth week of spring quarter.

==== Personnel Director ====
The Personnel Director serves as a non-voting ex-officio member of the Board of Directors and reports directly to the Vice President. They function as the Chief Human Resources Officer (CHRO) of the organization. The Personnel Director chairs the Personnel Committee which oversees all employee hiring. Responsibilities include overseeing all paid employee hiring and disciplinary procedures, preparing office space for incoming employees, and organizing association-wide events such as Fall Orientation and the Spring Social. The Personnel Director works with the Director of Diversity Efforts to recruit diverse applicants. They maintain files of job applicants, draft employment contracts, and advise the Board of Directors on personnel-related policies and procedures. The Personnel Director ensures employee accountability, initiates projects as necessary, and attends mandatory training sessions and staff meetings. They also verify the eligibility of individuals holding ASUW paid positions and ensure employee accountability. It is one of three hired Board of Director positions.

==== Communications Director ====
The Office of Communications (OCOMM) Director serves as a non-voting ex-officio member of the Board of Directors and reports directly to the President. They function as the Chief Marketing Officer (CMO) of the organization. Responsibilities include developing marketing and communication plans, managing external communications, and overseeing the Office of Communications employees. The OCOMM Director leads marketing campaigns, creates annual reports, and collaborates with various entities within ASUW. They serve as a resource for publicity strategies, ensure consistency in branding and marketing across all media, and work to maintain the ASUW website. Additionally, the Director collaborates with other departments to ensure accessibility and inclusivity of official materials, resolves conflicts among Office of Communications employees, and updates communications policies as needed. They maintain accountability through office hours, attend mandatory training sessions and staff meetings, and complete quarterly reports and evaluations. Furthermore, the Director serves as the Board liaison to the Office of Outreach and Involvement and the UW Sponsorship Advisory Committee. It is one of three hired Board of Director positions.

==== Finance & Budget Director ====
The Finance and Budget (F&B) Director serves as a non-voting ex-officio member of the Board of Directors and reports directly to the Vice President. They are the Chief Financial Officer (CFO) of the organization. Responsibilities include advising the Board of Directors on financial matters, chairing the Finance and Budget Committee, and overseeing the ASUW budget process. The F&B Director maintains financial policies, supervises internal fiscal operations, and ensures transparency by publishing financial records. They also manage payroll, oversee committee appointments, and serve on various committees including the Services and Activities Fee Committee. Additionally, the Finance and Budget Director serves as the Board liaison to the ASUW Enterprises of the ASUW Bike Shop and the ASUW Bean Basket, collaborating with these entities to set goals and monitor performance. It is one of three hired Board of Director positions.

==== Director of Internal Policy ====
The Director of Internal Policy is a voting member of the Board of Directors. They serve as the Chair of the Judicial Committee and Parliamentarian to the Board of Directors. In addition to enforcing ASUW Elections violations and ensuring compliance with record-keeping guidelines, the Director plays a crucial role in upholding transparency and accountability within the organization. They oversee compliance with the Open Public Meetings Act (OPMA) by registering all qualifying internal ASUW meetings with the UW Office of Public Records including those of the Judicial Committee, Finance and Budget Committee, Joint Commissions Committee, Personnel Committee, Transfer Student Advocacy Committee, ASUW Senate, and Legislative Steering Committee.

The Director manages ASUW's records, working with the Administrative Assistants to ensure proper records management and is the historian of the ASUW. The Director serves as a member of both the Graduate and Professional Student Senate and the Graduate and Professional Student Senate Executive Committee, with vote. They work with liaison entities to develop goals and strategies, establish specific benchmarks and metrics to measure their successes, and report progress to the Board of Directors. In case of conflicts or job description issues with liaison employees, the Director collaborates with the Personnel Director to recommend necessary corrective actions according to the ASUW Personnel Policy. The position is elected by instant run-off voting in the fourth week of spring quarter.

==== Director of Diversity Efforts ====
The Director of Diversity Efforts is a voting member of the Board of Directors. They serve as chair of the ASUW Joint Commissions Committee (JCC). The position is dedicated to advancing diversity, equity, and inclusion initiatives across the university campus. This position entails coordinating many programs and activities aimed at fostering a diverse and inclusive environment while addressing the needs of underrepresented communities within the student body. One of the Director of Diversity Efforts' main responsibilities is to facilitate collaboration among various ASUW commissions and organize diversity-focused programming. This includes assessing and addressing issues pertinent to University students related to diversity promotion, conducting research, and implementing strategic initiatives to promote inclusivity and awareness. The position is elected by instant run-off voting in the fourth week of spring quarter.

==== Director of University Affairs ====
The Director of University Affairs is a voting member of the Board of Directors. They are responsible for representing student interests in various university committees and advisory boards. They engage with faculty councils, university committees, and student councils, ensuring student voices are heard in decision-making processes. Additionally, they collaborate with the Student Senate and the Graduate and Professional Student Senate on academic and administrative issues, and work with the Office of Government Relations to advocate for student interests at legislative levels. The Director also addresses conflicts among liaison employees and reports progress to the Board of Directors. The position is elected by instant run-off voting in the fourth week of spring quarter.

==== Director of Programming ====
The Director of Programming is a voting member of the Board of Directors. The position oversees and coordinates a wide range of programming initiatives, including collaborations between ASUW entities and external organizations. The Director plans and executes large-scale events like the Everybody Every Body Fashion Show and W Day in partnership with entities like the Office of Student Health Relations and the UW Alumni Association. Additionally, they organize the RSO Leaders' Summit and serve as a liaison to Registered Student Organizations (RSOs). The Director also manages the Husky Pride Fund, overseeing fundraising efforts and submitting quarterly reports to the ASUW Board of Directors. The position is elected by instant runoff voting (IRV) in the fourth week of spring quarter.

==== Director of Community Relations ====
The Director of Community Relations is a voting member of the Board of Directors. The position serves as a vital link between the student body and various campus communities. They act as liaisons to diverse groups such as the Residential Community Student Association, Greek communities and councils, commuter and transfer students, student veterans, and international student organizations like the Center for International Relations & Cultural Leadership Exchange (CIRCLE). Additionally, the DCR collaborates with Parent & Family Programs, chairs the Undergraduate Transfer Student Advocacy Committee, and maintains communication with UW Housing and Food Services, Washington Student Athlete Advisory Council, UW Athletics, and the Dawg Pack Executive Board. They work with liaison entities to develop strategic goals and metrics for success, reporting progress to the ASUW Board of Directors. The position is elected by instant run-off voting in the fourth week of spring quarter.

==== Director of Campus Partnerships ====
The Director of Campus Partnerships is a voting member of the Board of Directors. The position plays a crucial role in fostering connections between the student body and various campus entities. Acting as a liaison, they engage with key stakeholders such as the University Bookstore, UW Police Department, Office of Student Conduct and Community Standards, U-District Partnership, Office of Student Health Relations, UW Recreation, UW Athletics, and UW Sustainability. Additionally, the Director appoints student representatives to committees like the Student Safety Advisory Board, U-Pass Advisory Board, University Transportation Committee, Campus Sustainability Fund, Environmental Stewardship Advisory Committee, and North Precinct Advisory Council through an open selection process. They collaborate with liaison entities to establish strategic goals and metrics for success, reporting progress to the ASUW Board of Directors. The position is elected by instant run-off voting in the fourth week of spring quarter.

==== GPSS Representative ====
The Graduate and Professional Student Senate (GPSS) representative to the Board of Directors is a voting member of the Board of Directors. The role is tasked to the GPSS Vice President of Internal Affairs. The position is bound by both the Constitution and Bylaws of the Graduate and Professional Student Senate, as well as those of the ASUW. This representative ensures alignment between the interests of graduate and professional students and the broader ASUW organization while carrying out their official duties.

==== ASUW Student Senate Representative ====
The ASUW Student Senate Representative to the Board of Directors was a role originally tasked to the ASUW Senate’s elected Senate Vice Speaker as a non-voting ex-officio member. In the 2024-25 school year the role was updated and tasked to the Senate Speaker in addition to becoming a voting ex-officio member. They are an integral link between the ASUW Student Senate and the Board of Directors. Selected in accordance with the Senate Bylaws and Rules, this representative ensures effective communication between the Student Senate and the Board of Directors by informing the latter of all legislative actions taken by the former. They operate within the framework provided by the Bylaws and Rules of the Student Senate, as well as the broader ASUW Constitution and Bylaws.

== Student Senate ==
The ASUW Senate is the sole, official opinion-making body of the Associated Students of the University of Washington. Founded in 1994, the Senate is in its 33rd Session as of the 2026-27 school year. The leadership of the Student Senate is the Senate Committee on Steering, made up of the Speaker, Vice Speaker, Public Relations Officer, Clerk, and Committee Chairs. The 33rd Session Senate Speaker is Avery Kirscht, the Vice Speaker is Collin Saywers, the Public Relations Officer is Pierce Wallbaum, and the Senate Clerk is Addison Wooster. Senate follows the Roberts Rules of Order.

Other committees of the Student Senate include four legislative committees and two non-legislative committees. The legislative committees, the Academic and Administrative Affairs, On-Campus, Off-Campus, and General Affairs, are assigned various pieces of legislation based on subject matter. In terms of non-legislative committees, Oversight maintains accountability for ASUW and its liaisons, whereas Resolution Follow-Up researches the effects and results of passed legislation.

Any registered member of ASUW may propose legislation. Legislation types include resolutions, which serve as statements of student opinion, Organic acts, which amend the Senate Bylaws, and Legislative Directives, which direct government lobbying efforts of the ASUW.

The legislative process begins with approval by the Senate Committee on Steering. Then, the legislation is presented to the Senate for questions and comments, followed by a period of committee edits. Upon being passed out of Committee, it is brought to the Senate floor for more debate and, finally, a vote on approval. Once legislation is passed by the Senate, the Board of Directors must approve it for enactment, and, once approved, legislation takes effect as official student opinion.

Membership in the Student Senate is open to all UW students. In order for a matriculated student to join the Senate, they must receive five signatures from other UW students, confirmed by the Public Relations Officer. Registered Student Organizations on campus may activate Senate seats as well, provided they have five or more members. Certain seats, additionally, are designated to ASUW diversity commissions and other major student groups and associations on campus, such as the Residential Community Student Association.

== Departments of the ASUW ==
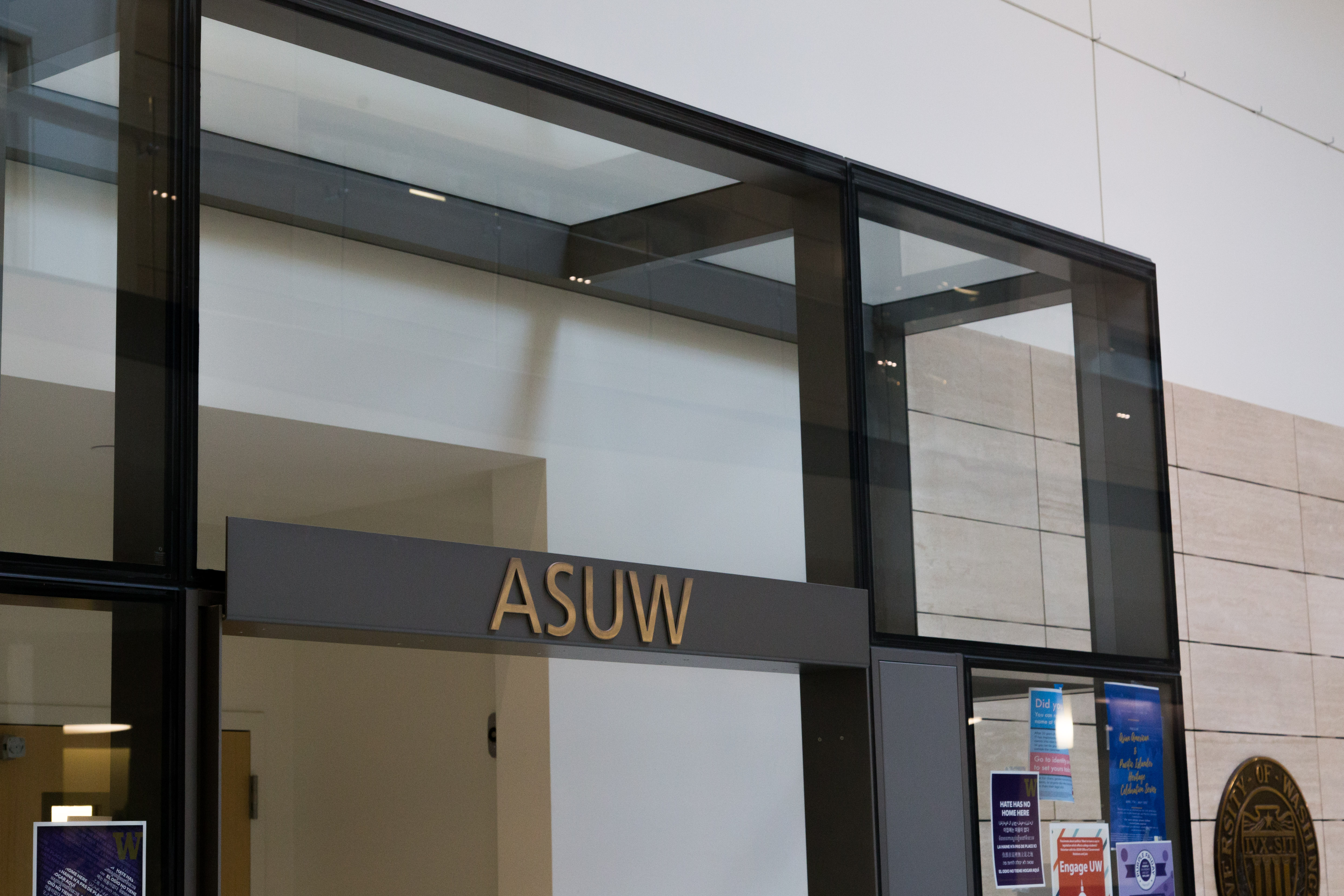
The ASUW Office located inside the Husky Union Building (HUB).

The ASUW is composed of over twenty different departments that serve student populations by providing identity-based support, access to legislative advocacy, and inclusive programming that brings in students from across the University of Washington's Seattle Campus:

Diversity Commissions

- American Indian Student Commission
- Asian Student Commission
- Black Student Commission
- Student Disability Commission
- Queer Student Commission
- Middle Eastern Student Commission
- Latine Student Commission
- Pacific Islander Student Commission
- Gender Equity Commission

Entities

- Arts & Entertainment
- Elections Administration Committee
- Office of Communications
- Office of Government Relations
- Office of Outreach and Involvement
- Office of Student Health Relations
- Rainy Dawg Radio Station
- UW Leaders
- Student Food Cooperative
- Sexual Assault and Relationship Violence Advocates
- Office of International Student Advocacy
- Office of Inclusive Design

Enterprises

- The Bike Shop
- The Bean Basket

=== Diversity Commissions ===
The ASUW is home to nine diversity commissions. These commissions are tasked with planning events and programming for their respective constituents. In 1991, the ASUW was one of the first colleges in the nation to create a Gay, Bisexual, and Lesbian Student Commission with over $10,000 in funding to help sponsor events for the community.

ASUW provides funding for programming and advocacy on behalf of issues affecting groups that have faced historical or social discrimination. There are currently nine different commissions that host events relating to educational goals and diversity. For instance, the Latine Student Commission focuses primarily on promoting awareness and advocacy for the Latinx/Chicanx community, and the Black Student Union focuses primarily on promoting awareness and advocacy for the African American/African community. Every Commission is run by a director, and the Joint Commissions Committee is a committee for these organizations to coordinate efforts for various combined causes and activities, and is chaired by the Director of Diversity Efforts, a member of the ASUW Board of Directors. The ASUW is often at the forefront of social justice issues that face both previous, current, and future generations of University of Washington students. For example, the ASUW has taken a stand against cultural appropriation through Halloween costumes by releasing a 6-minute public service announcement which drew the attention of major media outlets such as The New York Times.

=== Entities ===
The twelve entities of the ASUW are responsible for myriad events and programming for the student body. Entity focuses ranges from government lobbying from the Office of Government Relations to yearly school-wide concerts from Arts & Entertainment. Other entities include Rainy Dawg Radio, which is the only student run radio station on campus.

=== Enterprises ===
The ASUW has two enterprises that directly generate revenue from their operation: The Bike Shop and The Bean Basket.

The ASUW Bike Shop was founded in 1974 and is entirely student run. The Bike Shop is in the Husky Union Building (HUB) and provides mechanical bike services to the UW community. The Bike Shop offers extensive bike services and also allows students to use tools to service their own equipment.

The ASUW Bean Basket was started by the ASUW Student Food Cooperative program. The Bean Basket is a student-run bulk buying store and is the first student-run store opened on campus that serves students, faculty, and staff. The focus of The Bean Basket is food insecurity and health eating and the store sources its organic products in bulk to lower costs. Staples like dried oats, rice, dried fruit, and spices are all sold at cost to lower the prices for students. The store opened a new location in the Odegaard Library basement in Fall of 2023.

== Annual Events ==
=== Fall Fling ===
Fall Fling is a back-to-school concert featuring up and coming artists organized by ASUW Arts & Entertainment. It is organized in collaboration with The HUB and First Year Programs as a key-note event during the freshman welcome week period known as Dawg Daze.

=== Spring Show ===
Spring Show is ASUW's annual showcase. It occurs in Spring quarter of the UW academic year. The Show was temporarily discontinued during the COVID-19 pandemic and was brought back in 2022.

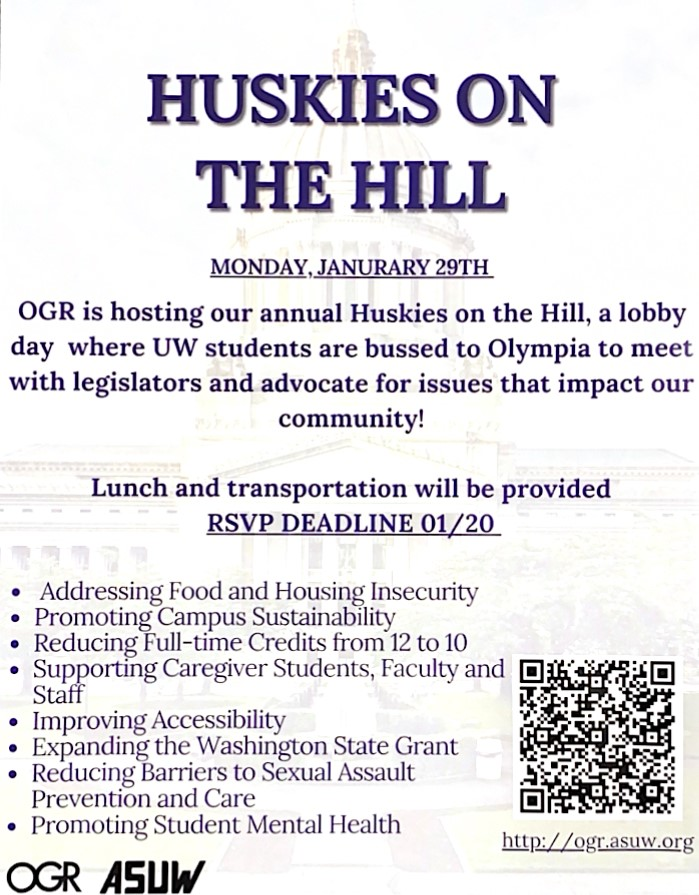
A poster advertising the annual student lobbying day in Olympia.

=== Huskies on the Hill ===
Huskies on the Hill is a day of lobbying and activism organized by the Office of Governmental Relations in conjunction with the Graduate and Professional Student Senate and the tri-campus governments of ASUWT and ASUWB. It is aimed to challenge the state legislative system with current affairs and provided University of Washington (UW) students the opportunity to travel to Olympia and lobby on behalf of student issues. Community members are assembled to engage in conversations with legislators regarding various issues affecting higher education experiences, including tuition and textbook costs, mental health resources, sexual assault protections, and disability inclusion and accessibility on campus.

=== Queer Prom ===
Queer Prom is a signature dance put on by the Queer Student Commission. Since 2022, the Gender Equity Commission has been a co-sponsor of this event. The event is ASUW's adaptation of the queer prom event and is an annual gathering space for the queer community at UW to celebrate their identic and reclaim an experience often inaccessible to the queer community in high school when prom traditionally occurs in the United States.

== Accomplishments ==
The ASUW works through programming, services, and advocacy to serve the students and improve student life on the UW campus. Annual activities like Fall Fling, a free concert at the beginning of the school year, and Everybody Every Body Fashion Show, a program designed to create dialogue around topics of bodies and identities, are just some of the many events that ASUW hosts each year. The Universal U-PASS, the UW Food Pantry, the University Bookstore, The Daily student newspaper, and many other campus staples were all the created because of the work of ASUW. In addition, the ASUW has also had a hand in campus remodeling, scholarships, cultural and ethnic awareness, and more.

Largely through the Student Senate, ASUW advocates for University policies as well as releasing opinions on city-wide, state-wide, and nation-wide issues. In 1996, a Student Senate resolution promoting equality for same sex couples and domestic partnerships within the university, as well as its inclusion in that year’s Legislative Agenda, drew criticism from a number of students. Supported by campus organizations such as Pride Dawgs and the Washington Student Lobby, the ASUW continued to lobby for domestic partnership equality, until the Board of Regents extended healthcare and housing benefits to same sex domestic partnerships in 1997.

In 2013, a Diversity credit requirement was introduced to UW’s general education requirements, spurred on by student activism. Up to that point, ASUW had a long history of advocating for this credit requirement – in 1991, following two years of negotiation, the Faculty Senate shot down one proposal. Leading up to its implementation in 2013, three resolutions of student opinion were formed pushing for the requirement to be adopted.

In Fall 2013, R-20-4 "A Resolution Opposed to 'Free Speech Zones'" was introduced to the ASUW Student Senate by Senator Forrest Taylor, joined by five fellow student cosponsors. On November 26, the resolution passed unanimously, earning praise from the Foundation for Individual Rights and Expression (FIRE), a free speech organization. FIRE, which has assigned the University of Washington Seattle Campus a "red light" speech rating, indicating poor protections for First Amendment rights, welcomed the Resolution as a step towards more free speech protections.

Following a 2015 stabbing incident of student-on-student violence, Jarred Ha, the accused perpetrator, received an emergency suspension from the University of Washington. When Ha’s acquittal was not met with a reversal of the suspension, the ASUW Student Senate passed a resolution calling on the University to amend emergency suspension procedures to correct perceived injustices against the student body. When a 2016 UW Spirit cheerleader auditions flyer on tryout appearance received massive backlash from the student body and general public, the ASUW released a statement denouncing the flyer in the strongest possible terms, declaring that it “completely objectifies women.”

In 2018, the Seattle City Council imposed a “one-year moratorium on rent-bidding platforms,” a controversial trend facing Seattle residents, as a result of a Student Senate resolution calling for a ban on the practice. Attorney General Bob Ferguson's 2022 cease-and-desist letter to Leda Health followed a complaint by the ASUW on the legal inadmissibility of their DIY sexual assault test kits. 2022-2023 ASUW President Timothy Billing worked closely with university administration following cases of gun violence on campus, seeking to "completely reexamine and uproot" what he viewed as outdated policy structures.

In 2024, the ASUW Student Senate passed R-30-7, formally adopting the Chicago Statement on freedom of expression and requesting that the UW administration do the same.

== Legal action ==
=== Good vs. Associated Students Washington Supreme Court Case 1975 ===
Good v. Associated Students was a legal case representing action taken by three University of Washington students, individually and as representatives of a class against the Associated Students of the University of Washington, the University of Washington, its regents, and others. The suit comes from the required student membership in the ASUW and the associated activities of the student organization and fees collected by the University. The two primary issues raised by the plaintiffs were “(1) Does the university have the authority to allocated funds to the ASUW? (2) Are students’ First Amendment rights violated by (a) the requirement that they be members of the ASUW; (b) that they are charged a fee to support the ASUW?”

The Court ruled that while it was legal for the University to collect Students and Activities Fees (SAF), it could not require mandatory enrollment in a student association. The mandatory enrollment in the student association violated students’ First Amendment right of freedom of association. The Court also recognized the special relationship between student associations and university administration as unique compared to other campus student groups.

The mandatory fee requirement would remain constitutional so long as the ASUW did not use student funds as the “vehicle for the promotion of one particular viewpoint, political, social, economic or religious.” Good v. Associated Students set the legal precedent that universities could not require mandatory student involvement in any extracurricular student organization.

== Partner Organizations ==
The University of Washington has a student government association for each campus in Washington – Seattle, Bothell, and Tacoma. These branches of ASUW mirror the administrative organization of the University of Washington. While the Associated Students of the University of Washington (ASUW) tends to refer to the student government of the Seattle campus, the Associated Students of the University of Washington Bothell (ASUWB) and the Associated Students of the University of Washington Tacoma (ASUWT) serve as equivalent organizations.

Furthermore, even within the University of Washington Seattle campus itself, ASUW is not the only student government. The Graduate and Professional Student Senate serves as the official government of graduate and professional students on campus, independent from ASUW. GPSS works with ASUW's Office of Government Relations for the Huskies on the Hill lobbying event, passing its own Legislative Agenda to supplement the goals of ASUW for student lobbying efforts.

ASUW is a member of the Washington Student Association, which serves as a state-wide, nonpartisan organization for governmental lobbying on behalf of Washington students. ASUW works alongside campus student groups, from receiving Senators from the Residential Community Student Association to collaborating with and funding events from clubs in UW.

== Notable alumni ==
- Bob Ferguson (ASUW President 1988-1989) - Washington State Governor
- Robert McKenna (ASUW President 1984-1984) - Washington State Attorney General
- Norm Dicks (ASUW Student Council) – Member of the U.S. House of Representatives
- Noah Purcell (ASUW Board of Control Member) – Washington State Solicitor General

== See also ==
- Student governments in the United States
- The Daily of the University of Washington
- The University of Washington
- The ASUW Shell House
