= USS Colorado (BB-45) =

Dreadnought battleship of the United States Navy

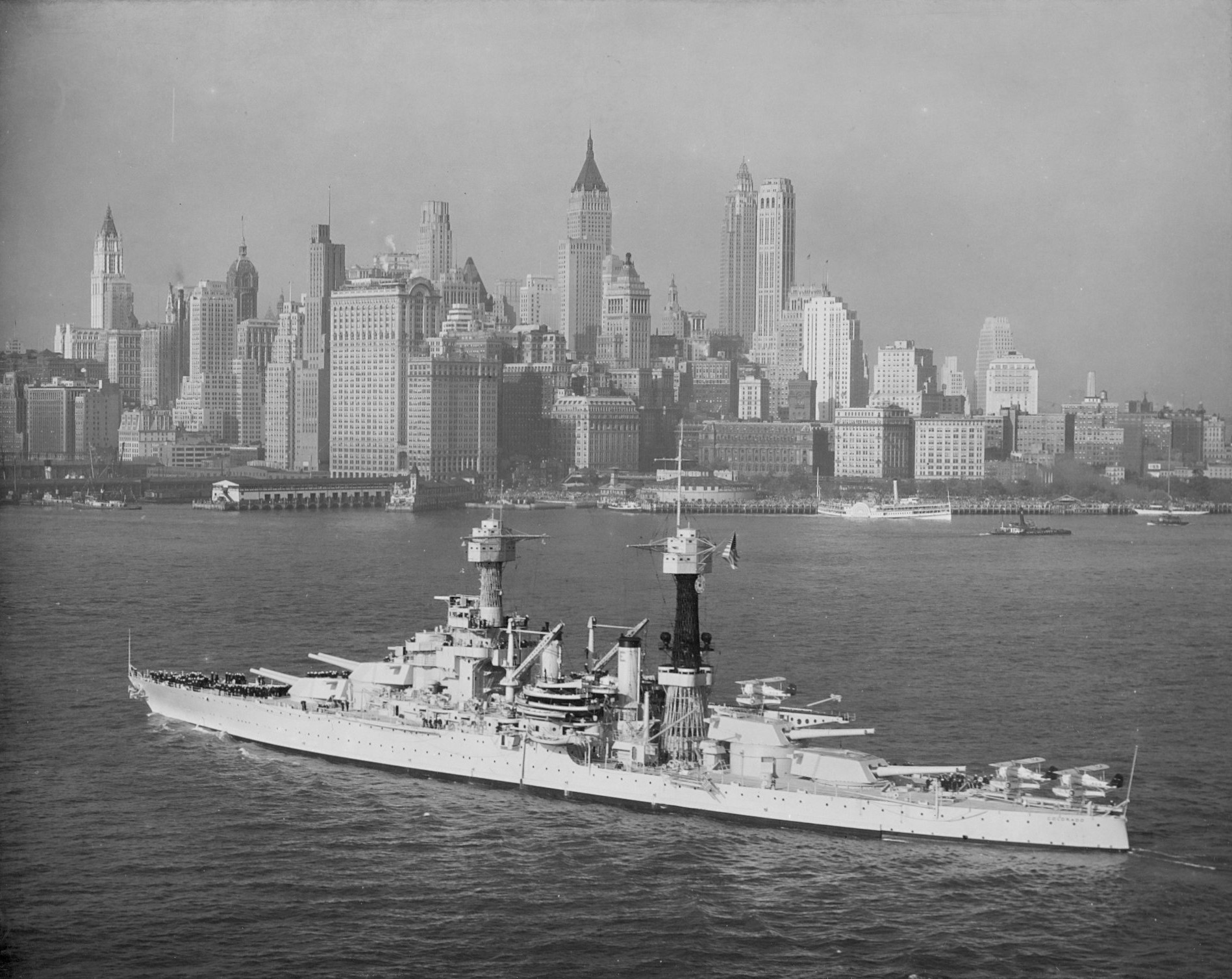
- USS Colorado visiting New York City in 1932.

History

United States
- Name: Colorado
- Namesake: Colorado
- Ordered: 29 August 1916
- Builder: New York Shipbuilding Corporation
- Laid down: 29 May 1919
- Launched: 22 March 1921
- Commissioned: 30 August 1923
- Decommissioned: 7 January 1947
- Stricken: 1 March 1959
- Fate: Sold for scrap, 23 July 1959

General characteristics
- Class & type: Colorado-class battleship
- Displacement: 32,600 long tons (33,100 t) (unloaded)
- Length: 624 ft 3 in (190.27 m)
- Beam: 97.5 ft (29.7 m)
- Draft: 30.5 ft (9.3 m)
- Speed: 21 kn (24 mph; 39 km/h)
- Armament: 8 × 16 in (406 mm)/45 cal Mark 1 guns; 14 × 5 in (127 mm)/51 caliber guns; 4 × 3 in (76 mm)/23 caliber guns; 2 × 21 inch (533 mm) torpedo tubes
- Armor: Belt: 8–13.5 in (203–343 mm); Barbettes: 13 in (330 mm); Turret face: 18 in (457 mm); Turret sides: 9–10 in (229–254 mm); Turret top: 5 in (127 mm); Turret rear 9 in (229 mm); Conning tower: 11.5 in (292 mm); Decks: 3.5 in (89 mm)
- Aircraft carried: Vought OS2U Kingfisher

USS Colorado, hull number BB-45, was a battleship of the United States Navy that was in service from 1923 to 1947. She was the lead ship of the Colorado class of battleships. Her keel was laid down on 29 May 1919, by the New York Shipbuilding Corporation. She was launched on 22 March 1921, and commissioned on 30 August 1923. She was armed with eight 16-inch (406 mm) guns and fourteen 5-inch (127 mm) deck guns; two 5-inch guns were removed in an overhaul.

Colorado took her maiden voyage in 1923, to Europe. She later operated with the Battle Fleet and sailed through the Pacific during the interwar years. She also underwent a further refit, during which her four 3-inch (76 mm) anti-aircraft guns were replaced with an equal number of 5 in (127 mm)/25 cal guns.

During World War II, in May 1942, soon after USA's entry into the war, Colorado undertook a defensive patrol near the Golden Gate Bridge to stop a possible Japanese invasion. She then sailed to Fiji, to stop any further Japanese advance into the Pacific. Next, she supported the landings on Tarawa, the Marshall Islands, Saipan, Guam, and Tinian. On 24 July 1944, during the shelling of Tinian, Colorado received 22 shell hits from shore batteries, but continued to support the invading troops until 3 August. She later arrived in Leyte Gulf on 20 November 1944, to support American troops fighting ashore. On 27 November, she was hit by two kamikazes which caused moderate damage.

After that, Colorado sailed to Luzon on 1 January 1945, where she participated in the preinvasion bombardments in Lingayen Gulf. She returned to Okinawa on 6 August and sailed from there to Japan for the occupation of the country, arriving in Tokyo on 27 August. Departing Tokyo Bay on 20 September, she arrived at San Francisco on 15 October. She was placed out of commission in reserve in Pearl Harbor on 7 January 1947, and sold for scrapping on 23 July 1959. She won seven battle stars during her service. Many of Colorado's anti-aircraft guns are in museums across the state of Colorado (her bell and teak decking are also in museums and the USO in the Seattle-Tacoma airport) or mounted on the museum ship Olympia.

== Design ==
In 1916, design work was completed on the next class of battleships to be built for the United States Navy beginning in 1917. These ships were nearly direct copies of the preceding Tennessee class, with the exception of the main battery, which increased from twelve 14-inch (356 mm) guns to eight 16 in (406 mm) guns. The Colorado class proved to be the last class of battleships completed of the standard type.

Colorado was 624 ft (190 m) long overall and she had a beam of 97 ft 6 in (29.72 m) and a draft of 30 ft 6 in (9.30 m). She displaced 32,693 long tons (33,218 t) as designed and up to 33,590 long tons (34,130 t) at full load. The ship was powered by four General Electric turbo-electric drives with steam provided by eight oil-fired Babcock & Wilcox boilers. The ship's propulsion system was rated at 28,900 shaft horsepower (21,600 kW) for a top speed of 21 knots (39 km/h; 24 mph), though on speed trials she reached 31,268 shp (23,317 kW) and a speed of 21.09 kn (39.06 km/h; 24.27 mph). She had a normal cruising range of 8,000 nmi (15,000 km; 9,200 mi) at 10 kn (19 km/h; 12 mph), but additional fuel space could be used in wartime to increase her range to 21,100 nmi (39,100 km; 24,300 mi) at that speed. Her crew numbered 64 officers and 1,241 enlisted men.

She was armed with a main battery of eight 16 in /45 caliber Mark 1 guns in four twin-gun turrets on the centerline, (Note: /45 caliber refers to the length of the gun in terms of caliber. The length of a /45 caliber gun is 45 times its bore diameter.) two forward and two aft in superfiring pairs. The secondary battery consisted of sixteen 5-inch (127 mm)/51 caliber guns, mounted individually in casemates clustered in the superstructure amidships. She carried an anti-aircraft battery of eight 3-inch (76 mm)/50 caliber guns in individual high-angle mounts. As was customary for capital ships of the period, she had a 21 in (533 mm) torpedo tube mounted in her hull below the waterline on each broadside. Colorado's main armored belt was 8–13.5 in (203–343 mm) thick, while the main armored deck was up to 3.5 in (89 mm) thick. The main battery gun turrets had 18 in (457 mm) thick faces on 13 in (330 mm) barbettes. Her conning tower had 16 in (406 mm) thick sides.

== Service history ==
=== Inter-war period ===
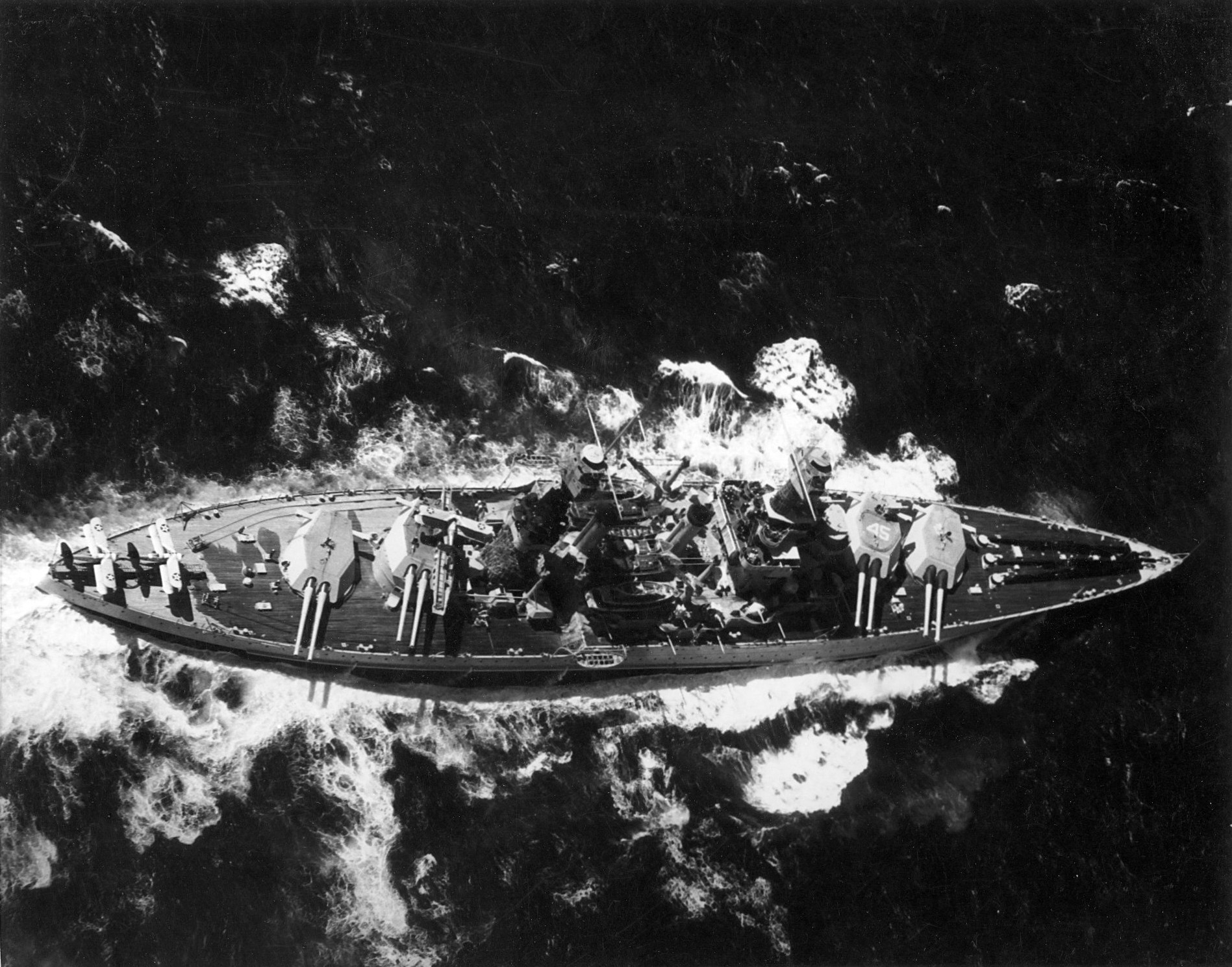
Colorado steams through rough seas, circa 1932

Her keel was laid down on 29 May 1919 by the New York Shipbuilding Corporation of Camden, New Jersey. Named for the 38th state, she was launched on 22 March 1921 and commissioned on 30 August 1923 for her initial sea trials and training. The ship's first commanding officer was Captain Reginald R. Belknap. On 29 December 1923, Colorado departed New York, bound for Portsmouth in the United Kingdom. She thereafter sailed south to visit Cherbourg and then Villefranche-sur-Mer, France. She also stopped in Naples, Italy, and the British naval base at Gibraltar. She arrived back in New York on 15 February 1924. There, the ship underwent repairs and further testing before getting underway on 11 July for the West Coast of the United States. She reached San Francisco, California on 15 September, where she joined the Battle Fleet. She remained a part of this unit for the next fifteen years.

Over the course of the 1920s and 1930s, Colorado took part in the series of Fleet Problems, which were large-scale training exercises held annually. These took place in the Pacific and the Caribbean Sea. During this period, she also took part in various ceremonies and naval reviews with the rest of the fleet. From 8 June to 26 September 1925, the ship participated in a voyage to visit American Samoa, Australia, and New Zealand with several other battleships of the fleet. She ran aground on Diamond Reef in the Hudson River, near the mouth of the East River, midway between Governors Island and The Battery on 30 April 1927. but was refloated on 2 May. Colorado was overhauled in 1928–1929, during which her four 3-inch (76 mm) anti-aircraft guns were replaced by eight 5-inch (130 mm)/25 caliber guns. From 10 to 11 March 1933, the ship went to Long Beach, California, to assist in relief efforts following an earthquake.

In the summer of 1937 Colorado was the training ship for NROTC students from the University of Washington and University of California, Berkeley. She embarked the University of Washington students in Puget Sound on 15 June, and the University of California students four days later in San Francisco Bay. The ship arrived in Hilo, Hawaii, on 26 June and sailed two days later for Lahaina Roads, where the students practiced firing the 5-inch/51 caliber guns in whose casemates they were berthed in hammocks. Liberty in Honolulu began on 1 July, but was interrupted the following day so Colorado could join the search for Amelia Earhart. She rendezvoused with the United States Coast Guard cutter Itasca on 7 July and launched seaplanes to search the Phoenix Islands. After holding a line-crossing ceremony on 9 July, she returned the NROTC students to their schools on the west coast.

=== World War II ===
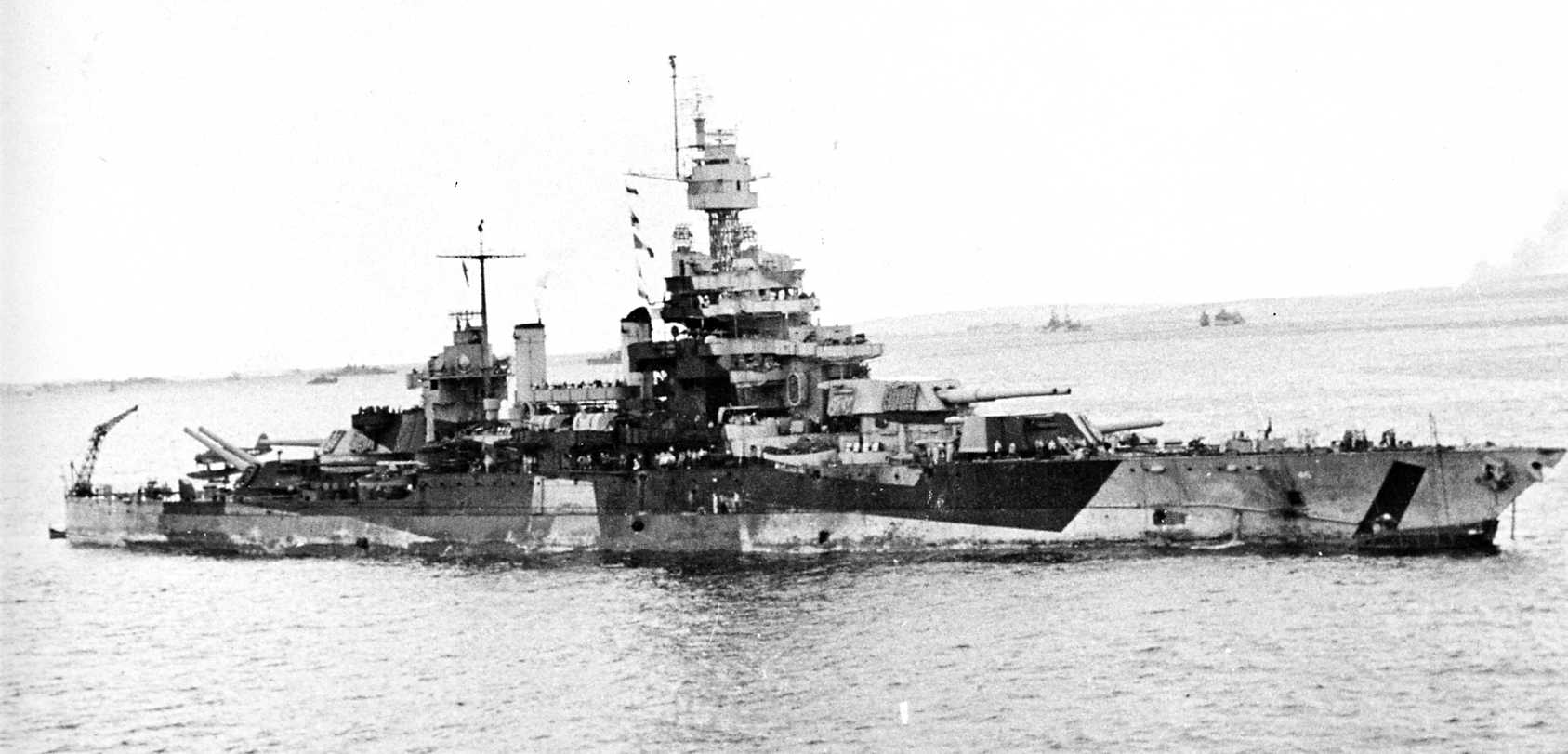
USS Colorado off Tinian, on 24 July 1944, with hull damage, the result of 22 hits from shore batteries

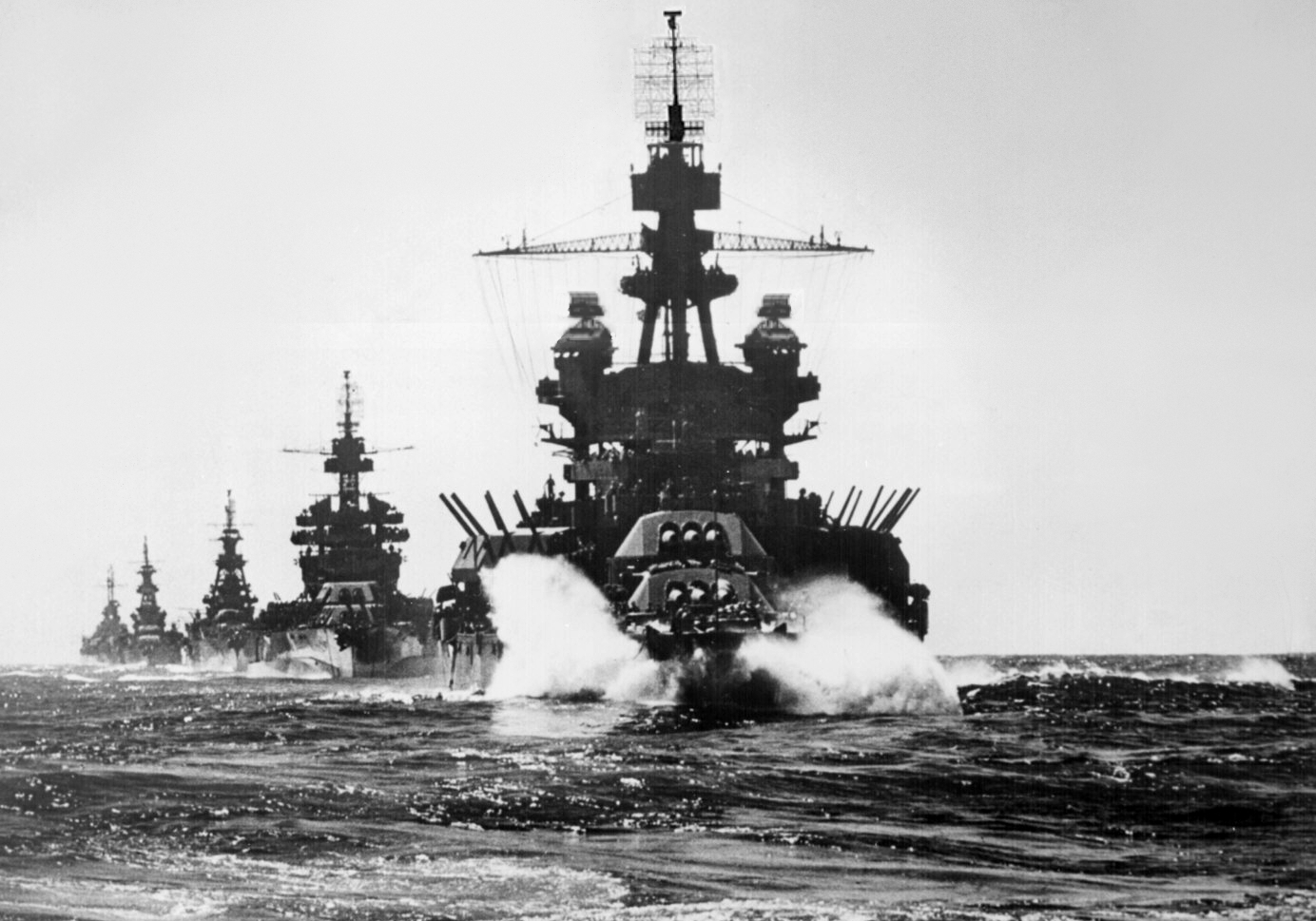
Pennsylvania leading Colorado, Louisville, Portland, and Columbia into Lingayen Gulf in January 1945.

From 27 January 1941, Colorado was based in Pearl Harbor undergoing intensive training exercises and taking part in several war games until 25 June, when she departed Hawaii for the West Coast. Undergoing overhaul at the Puget Sound Navy Yard, she was not present for the attack on Pearl Harbor on 7 December. During the refit, her 5 in/51 battery was reduced to eight, both to create space for more anti-aircraft guns and to free up some to arm merchant ships against surface raiders.

After refit Colorado carried out extensive training maneuvers along the West Coast. On 31 May, she and Maryland patrolled near Golden Gate Bridge to protect San Francisco from any Japanese attack. Some time after this she returned to Pearl Harbor to complete her final preparations for action. She operated in the vicinity of the Fiji Islands and New Hebrides from 8 November 1942 to 17 September 1943 to prevent any further Japanese expansion in the Pacific. She sailed from Pearl Harbor on 21 October 1943 to provide pre-invasion shelling and fire support for the invasion of Tarawa, returning to port on 7 December 1943. After another overhaul on the West Coast, Colorado returned to Lahaina Roads, in the Hawaiian Islands, on 21 January 1944 and sortied the next day for the Marshall Islands. She provided the pre-invasion bombardment and fire support for the invasions of Kwajalein and Eniwetok until 23 February, when she headed for the Puget Sound Navy Yard for another overhaul.

She joined other units going for the Mariana Islands at the harbor at San Francisco. She departed on 5 May passing Pearl Harbor and Kwajalein to the pre-invasion shelling at Saipan, Guam, and Tinian after 14 June. During the shelling of Tinian on 24 July she was damaged, 43 men were killed, and 198 wounded by 22 shell hits from 150mm Japanese shore batteries; she continued shelling the island and providing fire support for the invasion troops. After undergoing extensive repairs along the West Coast, she arrived in Leyte Gulf to begin the invasion of Leyte. A week after her arrival she was struck by two kamikaze bombers, which killed 19 crewmembers, injured 72, and moderately damaged the ship. Despite the damage, she bombarded Mindoro on schedule from 12 to 17 December 1944. She then proceeded to Manus Island for urgent repairs.

She returned to Luzon on New Year's Day 1945 to participate in the pre-invasion shelling of Lingayen Gulf. She was hit by accidental gunfire eight days later. The gunfire hit her superstructure, and caused 69 casualties (18 killed, 51 wounded). After a few repairs at the island of Ulithi, she joined Task Force 54 (TF 54), the pre-invasion shelling group for the invasion of Okinawa, at Kerama Retto. She stayed at Okinawa until 22 May, providing anti-aircraft cover and fire support for the invasion troops. On 6 August, she returned to the occupied Okinawa to sail to Japan for its occupation. On 27 August, she covered the airborne occupation of Atsugi Airfield. Colorado was awarded seven battle stars for her World War II service.

=== Post war ===
Colorado departed Tokyo Bay on 20 September 1945 for San Francisco. She arrived there on 15 October, and then sailed for Seattle for Navy Day (27 October). She was part of the Operation Magic Carpet force, making three runs to Pearl Harbor to transport 6357 soldiers home, before returning to Bremerton Navy Yard for her deactivation. She was placed out of commission in reserve on 7 January 1947 and was sold for scrap on 23 July 1959.

== Artifacts on display ==
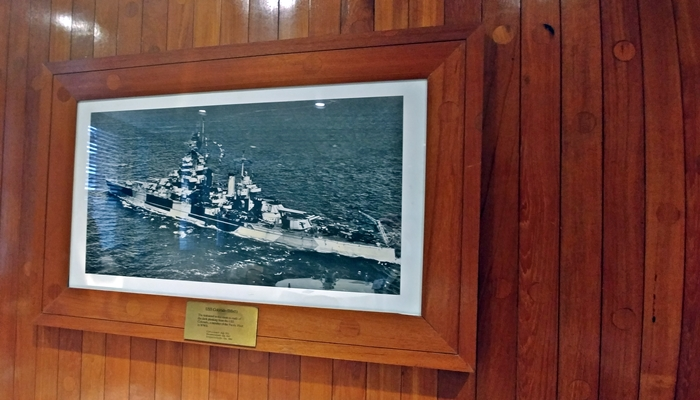
Boards from the deck of USS Colorado form a wall in the Legends Room of the Washington Athletic Club

The ship's bell and helm is currently on display in the University of Colorado Navy Reserve Officer Training Corps, Wardroom. A 5 in (130 mm)/51 cal deck gun from Colorado was donated to the Puget Sound Maritime Historical Society in 1959. The gun was originally displayed at the Museum of History and Industry in Seattle and was transferred to the Veterans Memorial Museum in Chehalis in 2011. It was one of eight such guns on Colorado.

Six of Colorado's 5/51 cal guns were put aboard the protected cruiser USS Olympia, after she became a museum in Philadelphia in 1957. Boards from her teak-wood deck were re-purposed to form a wall in the main lounge of Haggett Hall at the University of Washington. A plaque commemorates the source. Deck boards are also used in a wall in the Legends Room of the Washington Athletic Club, having originally been preserved within the club at the behest of two former officers of the ship who were club members.

On 7 February 2014, Boeing donated some decking from Colorado to the USO Northwest SeaTac Center to serve as the new center's entry flooring. Her helm is in the collection of the Colorado Springs Museum. It was donated to the museum in 1961 by Rear Admiral G. R. Luker and other naval officers. Admiral Luker served on Colorado. The donation also included a bronze plaque and other historical materials.
