= The Daily of the University of Washington =

Student newspaper in Seattle, Washington

- The January 30, 2014 front page of The Daily
- Type: Daily student newspaper
- School: University of Washington, Seattle
- Owner: The University of Washington Student Publications
- Publisher: John Tomasic
- Editor-in-chief: Leah Downing
- Managing editor: Zoe Gordon
- News editor: Sophia Sostrin
- Metro editor: Montanna Lovins (Arts + Culture Editor)
- Opinion editor: Jaya Parsons
- Photo editor: Joseph Esteban
- Founded: 1891; 135 years ago
- Language: English
- Headquarters: 144 Communications Building; University of Washington; Seattle, Washington 98195
- Circulation: 10,000
- OCLC number: 19464732
- Website: dailyuw.com

The Daily of the University of Washington (usually referred to in Seattle simply as The Daily) is the student newspaper of the University of Washington in Seattle, Washington. It is staffed entirely by University of Washington students, excluding the publisher, advertising adviser, accounting staff, and delivery staff.

The Daily features regular news, sports, opinion, and arts & leisure sections, as well as weekly science and wellness sections and an online podcast.

In addition to its regular daily and weekly sections, The Daily publishes a number of special sections every year. An edition of The Game Daily is published before each home football and men's basketball game, and is distributed on campus and at the tailgate party before the game. Other special sections throughout the year often include The Holidaily, Sex Edition, Spring Break Edition, Outdoors Guide, Greek Edition, Career Guide, and Housing Guide. A special Graduation Edition and Salute to Grads are distributed on campus, at all graduation exercises, and commencement.

Additionally, The Daily publishes a magazine: Pacific Wave.

The Daily is overseen by the Board of Student Publications, which consists of representatives from the Associated Students of the University of Washington (ASUW), the Graduate and Professional Student Senate (GPSS), the Faculty Senate, the UW Department of Communication, the UW administration, the Daily newsroom, and a local professional publication.

== History ==
The Daily was founded in September 1891 as The Pacific Wave and ran under that title until June 5, 1908, having absorbed the short-lived campus paper The College Idea which ran during the 1895–1896 school year. The newspaper became a daily with its September 15, 1908 issue and changed its name to The Pacific Daily Wave. This name lasted until May 21, 1909, and the paper became The University of Washington Daily when the 1909–1910 school year began.

The University of Washington Daily ceased publishing Monday issues in 1933 during the Great Depression. It became The Daily of the University of Washington in 1976, and in 1985 it resumed publishing on Mondays.

In 2007, The Daily became a partner with Next Door Media and jointly launched udistrictdaily.com, a blog that reports on the U-District in Seattle, Washington.

In 2010, The Daily created a half-hour television companion show called The Daily's Double Shot. The first episode premiered on UWTV, Channel 27 on February 5, 2010, with new episodes premiering every two weeks during the academic year.

In 2016, The Daily switched to a twice weekly print schedule on Mondays and Thursday, with regular online content the other weekdays.

In 2018, The Daily switched to a once weekly print schedule on Mondays, with regular online content the other weekdays.

In 2020, as a result of the novel coronavirus pandemic, The Daily switched to a twice weekly email newsletter, with regular online content every weekday.

As of June 2021, The Daily plans to resume its once weekly print schedule on Mondays, continue its twice weekly email newsletter, and publish other print products including sports-focused Game Dailies, quarterly Pacific Wave magazines, and other special sections.

== Awards ==
Former awards include Newspaper of the Year from the Associated Collegiate Press in 1996, 1997 and 2000; and the Mark of Excellence Award for the Best All Around Newspaper in the nation from the Society of Professional Journalists in 1997.

At the 2010 National College Media Conference The Daily earned the Pacemaker for General Excellence, Best of Show, Story of the Year Editorial/Opinion, Story of the Year Diversity and Multimedia Story of the Year. The Daily also earned the 2007, 2008, 2009 and 2010 Apple Award for the best four-year college newspaper (tabloid) in the United States at the CMA Spring Convention in New York City. It has also been recognized with the 2007, 2008 and 2009 Mark of Excellence Award for the Best All-Around Newspaper in Region 10 (Washington, Oregon, Idaho, Montana and Alaska) by the Society of Professional Journalists. It was a finalist for the 2009 Pacemaker Newspaper of the Year, and earned second place for Best of Show at the National College Media Conference.

== Controversy ==
=== 2008 gay marriage op-ed ===
In November 2008, The Daily ran an op-ed column written by John Fay, a columnist, which criticized gay marriage as part of a point/counterpoint regarding the passage of Proposition 8 in California. The piece was accompanied by an illustration of a man standing next to a sheep, referencing Fay's statement that allowing gay marriage would lead to legal bestiality. Among other controversial statements, Fay argued that "being homosexual, like other emotional tendencies, doesn't make someone a bad person, but it's a problem that needs to be dealt with, not denied." The article sparked outrage among the student body, and students assembled in the Husky Union Building to protest, claiming that the article encouraged "fear and hate".

The Graduate and Professional Student Senate (GPSS) drafted a resolution at their December 3, 2008, meeting to have the editor-in-chief and opinion editor to either apologize for the publication of the opinion piece and illustration, or to resign. Editor-in-chief Sarah Jeglum stated that she supported balanced viewpoints and did not plan to give the apology as requested. She encouraged groups and individuals to continue to voice their various opinions and to have The Daily act as a public forum for a variety of opinion. The GPSS then passed a resolution at its February 4, 2009 meeting to direct the Graduate and Professional Student Senate representative on the Board of Student Publications to vote for censure of Jeglum.

On February 10, 2009, the Associated Students of the University of Washington (ASUW) passed a resolution supporting "the independence of The Daily as a member of the free press", and "its right to publish controversial material provided it is within the bounds of speech protected by the first amendment and THAT the ASUW finds that printing this article did not cross those legal boundaries and did not violate The Daily's code of ethics, thus a call for censure of Sarah Jeglum is not warranted."

The Board of Student Publications met on February 19 to consider the GPSS resolution to censure Sarah Jeglum. The Board voted with two yea, and five nay; the resolution failed to be adopted.

ASUW then considered another resolution in response to the GPSS attempt to censure, to establish Free Speech and National Freedom of Speech Week during the third week of October.

== Notable alumni ==
- Rod Mar — Team photographer for the NFL team the Seattle Seahawks since 2009, and former staff photographer for the Seattle Times between 1989 and 2008.
- Heather Brooke — journalist/activist who helped force the resignation of the Speaker of the British House of Commons with her investigation into expenses of MPs
- Luke Burbank — Emmy Award-winning radio personality and podcaster, host of Too Beautiful to Live and Live Wire Radio, correspondent for CBS News Sunday Morning
- Jim Caple — former senior writer for ESPN, former sports editor for The Daily
- Ron Chew — former editor of the International Examiner and past director of the Wing Luke Asian Museum
- Timothy Egan — 2006 National Book Award winner; Pulitzer Prize winner, enterprise reporter for The New York Times
- Luke Esser — former chairman of the State of Washington Republican Party, former state senator
- David Horsey — two-time Pulitzer Prize winner, editorial cartoonist for the Los Angeles Times and formerly for the Seattle Post-Intelligencer
- Evelyn Iritani — 2004 Pulitzer Prize winner
- John Keister — comedian and host of the local comedy program
- Bryan Monroe — editor, CNNPolitics.com, president, National Association of Black Journalists, former editor of Ebony magazine, former Daily editor
- Eric Nalder — two-time Pulitzer Prize winner, chief investigative reporter for the Seattle Post-Intelligencer
- Sean Nelson, Jeff J. Lin, Aaron Huffman — members of the band Harvey Danger
- Bill Radke — former National Public Radio commentator, former Daily copy editor
- Peter Rinearson — Pulitzer Prize winner, author, executive, entrepreneur

== See also ==
- University of Washington Television
- List of student newspapers
- List of National Newspaper Pacemaker winners
