= Terry and Lander Halls =

Student residence halls at the University of Washington

Coordinates: 47°39′20.4″N 122°18′55.8″W

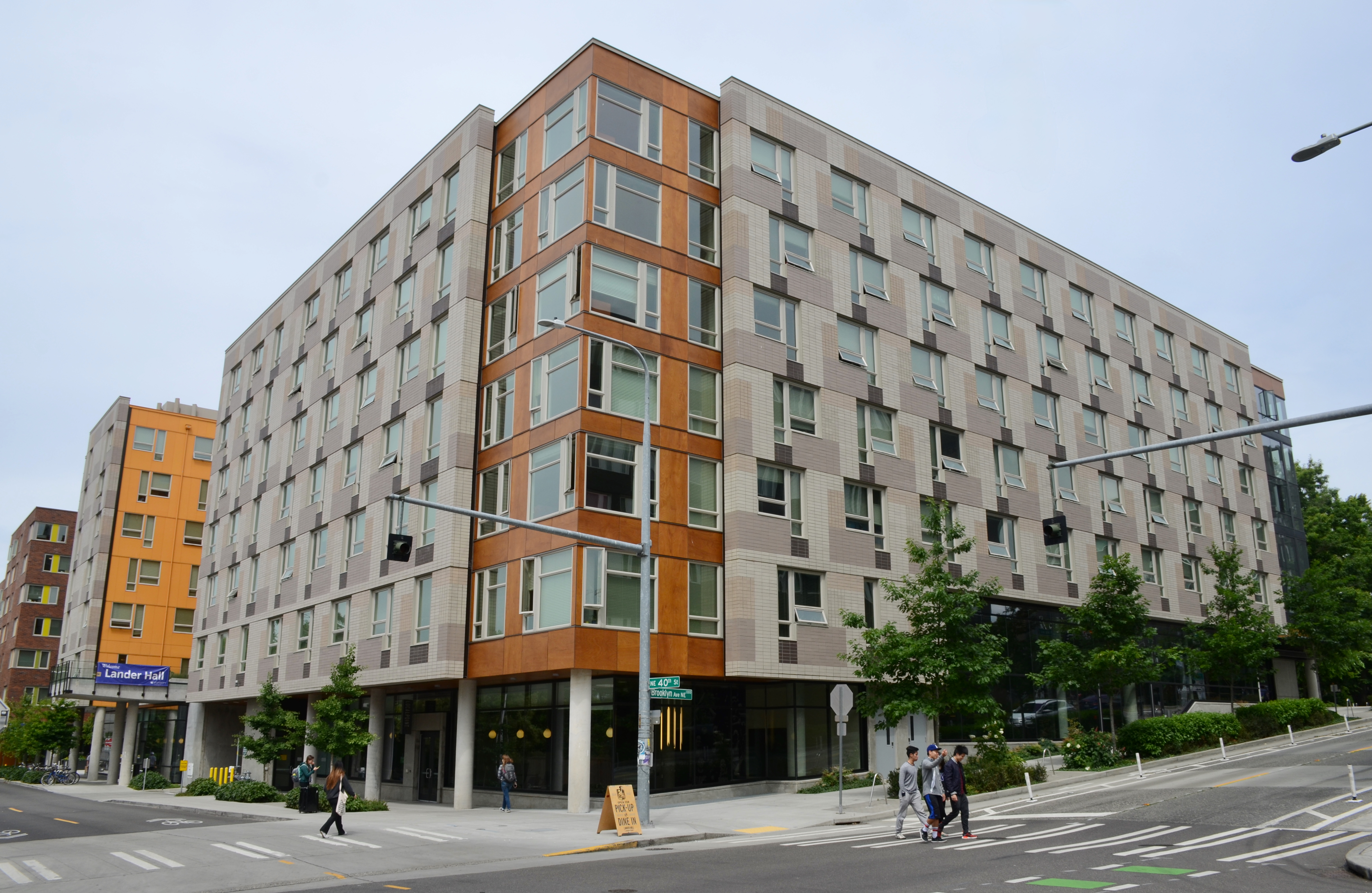
The current Lander Hall in 2016

Terry and Lander Halls are two student residence halls of the University of Washington, in Seattle. First opened in 1917, they have occupied various buildings over the years, have always been residence halls and always located next to each other until the most recent construction, of 2012–2015, which has Maple Hall between them. The earlier, 1950s buildings were between eight and eleven stories tall and were the university's first high-rise dormitories.

The set of buildings was named for Charles and Mary Terry and Judge Edward Lander, who contributed part of the land for the original Territorial University's 10-acre (4.0 ha) Seattle campus in 1861.

== History ==
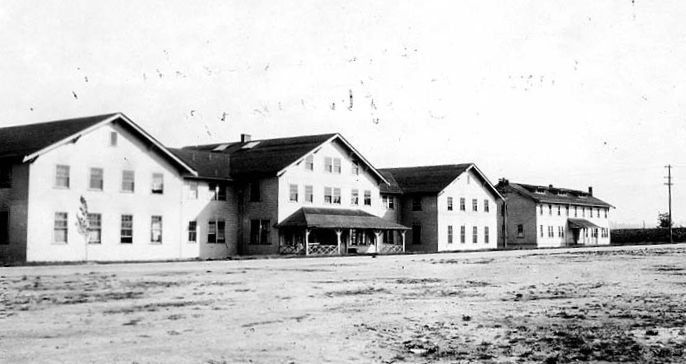
Terry Hall and Lander Hall, men's dormitories, 1922

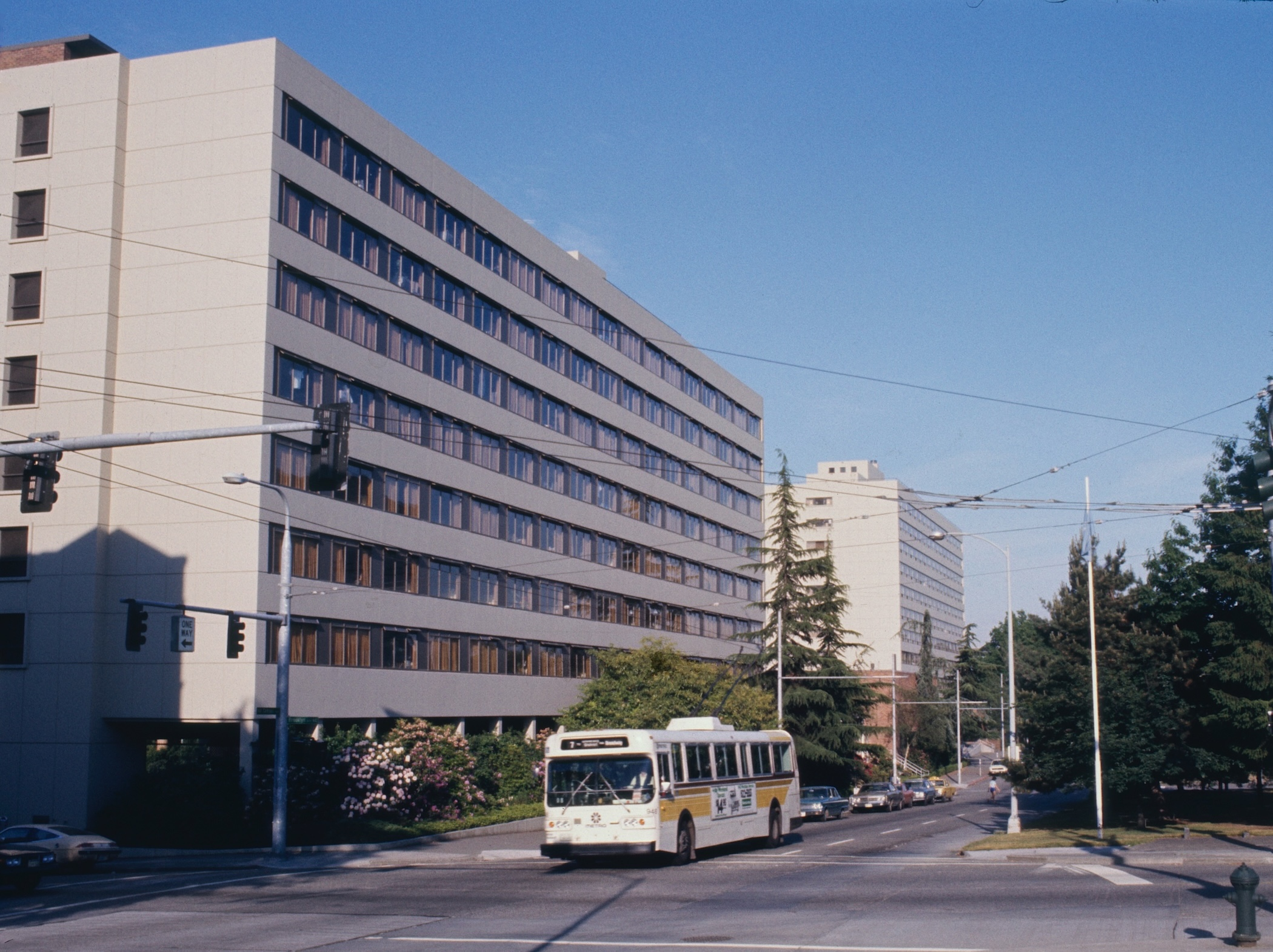
The 1950s buildings in 1982, with Lander Hall closest and Terry Hall in the background

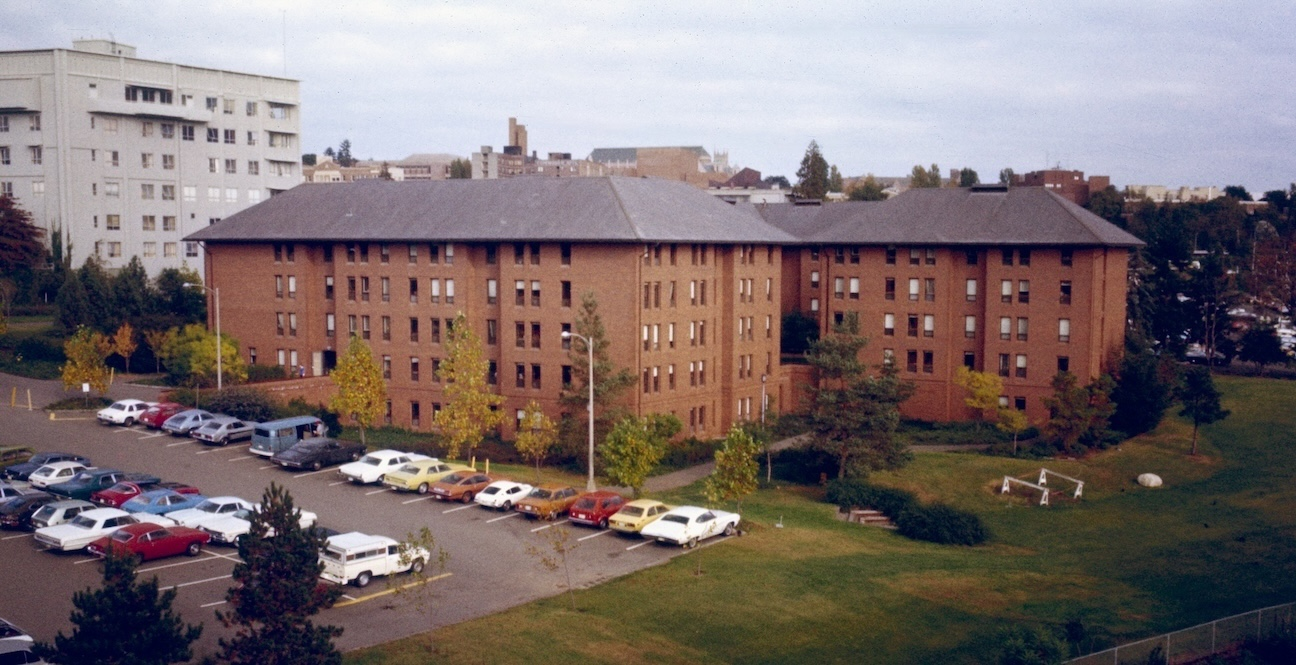
Mercer Hall, whose residents used the Terry–Lander dining hall, was demolished in 2011.

The original Terry and Lander Halls were built in 1917 for the U.S. Naval Training Camp, as the Camp's Aviation Dormitory and Naval Officer's Dormitory, also known as USNTC Buildings 39 and 40, respectively. Both were designed by the Bremerton Navy Yard and were located southwest of the site that soon afterward was used for Husky Stadium, along Montlake Boulevard. In 1919, they became men's dormitories for the university and served as such until they were torn down in 1928.

=== 1950s buildings ===
From the 1950s to the 2010s, Terry and Lander Halls were two connected towers on the west campus of the University of Washington in Seattle, sharing common facilities–including a dining hall–on the bottom two floors. Their addresses were 1101 and 1201 NE Campus Parkway, respectively. Terry Hall opened in 1953, the same year that Campus Parkway was completed, and Lander Hall in 1957. They were the university's first high-rise dormitories and originally were men's-only dorms. Architects for both towers were the firm of Young, Richardson, Carleton and Deltie. Terry Hall was eleven stories tall, and Lander was eight.

The ground floor of Lander Hall contained some of the central offices of the Department of Housing and Food Services. In the fourth quarter of 2011 (fall term), Terry Hall had 846 residents, an increase from 624 the year before, and several rooms had been converted from doubles to triples to accommodate the demand.

=== 2010s replacement ===
Replacement of the 1950s buildings was part of an $850 million, multi-year plan to build several dorm and student apartment buildings that was announced by the university in 2008. The plans included the demolition in 2011 of nearby Mercer Hall, which was built in 1969–1970 and was the youngest of UW's main residence halls but was a "less popular" dorm. It was demolished in July 2011 and replaced in 2013 by an apartment complex named Mercer Court.

The 1953 Lander Hall was demolished in summer 2012 and replaced with a new standalone building on the site, opened at the end of December 2013. The connected Terry Hall ceased to be used as a residence hall in December 2013, was demolished in 2014 and replaced by a new standalone building on the site along with an additional residence hall named Maple Hall between Terry and Lander; they opened in 2015. The cost of the new Lander Hall was $78 million, of which $49 million was for its construction and the remainder for design, project management, demolition, and furnishings. The cost for Terry and Maple Halls was $123 million.

The new Lander Hall has 243,000 ft^{2} (22,600 m^{2}) of space, while the new Terry and Maple Halls together have 406,310 ft^{2} (37,747 m^{2}). The latter two are each eight stories tall, and Lander is seven stories tall. Lander's address remains 1201 NE Campus Parkway, while Terry Hall's is now 1035 NE Campus Parkway and Maple Hall's is 1135 NE Campus Parkway Designed for low energy use, all three buildings have received LEED gold certification from the U.S. Green Building Council.

== Non-residential uses ==
The central office of the university's Housing and Food Services department is located in Terry Hall. Terry is also home to the Honors Community. The dining hall for Terry, Lander, and Maple Halls, known as Local Point, is located in Lander Hall.

== See also ==
- Housing at the University of Washington
