= Graduate and Professional Student Senate =

Coordinates: 47.655253°N 122.30524°W

The Graduate and Professional Student Senate (GPSS) at the University of Washington is the official student government for graduate and professional students at the University of Washington. GPSS is made up of two senators from each degree-granting department, four officers and several staff members. GPSS provides students with representation on the university's Seattle campus, in the state legislature, and in Congress. It also acts as a resource center and funds graduate programming.

== History ==
The Graduate & Professional Student Senate was founded in 1967 to provide a separate focus and voice for the interests of graduate and professional students at the University of Washington. Prior to its founding, all students were represented by the Associated Students of the University of Washington (ASUW), founded in 1906. As interests between the ASUW and GPSS have become more specialized, GPSS has established itself as an organization devoted to serving as a platform for issues related to graduate and professional student life. The two entities formally became two autonomous organizations in April 1976. While the ASUW still represents all students, GPSS represents only graduate and professional student interests.

In 2007 GPSS initiated an annual Higher Education Summit, bringing together academics, policymakers, and practitioners to discuss issues important to higher education and graduate & professional students. Each summit has taken up a different topic related to contemporary issues in higher education in Washington State. In 2008 GPSS was one of the founding members of Student Advocates for Graduate Education (SAGE), a national coalition of graduate student governments from other top tier public research universities. In March 2025, GPSS helped restart the United States Student Association (USSA) at the Legislative Conference in Washington D.C..

== Composition ==
GPSS is governed by a Constitution and a set of Bylaws. Meetings of the Senate are typically held at least once a month throughout the school year. GPSS has six elected officers: President, vice-president of Internal Affairs, vice-president of External Affairs, vice-president of Equity and Inclusion, vice-president of Administration, and vice-president of Finance. GPSS has five standing committees and two Ad Hoc committees in addition to the full Senate through which it conducts its business:

Standing Committees:

- Executive Committee
- Judicial Committee
- Finance and Budget (F&B)
- Elections
- Empowerment, Diversity, and Accountability Committee (Diversity Committee)

Ad Hoc Committees:

- Legislative Advisory Board (LAB)
- Committee for Senator Motivation and Retention (CSMR)

== Current Officers 2025-2026 ==
- President: Ryan Wicklund
- Vice-President of Internal Affairs: Juan Mora
- Vice-President of External Affairs: Annika Peterson
- Vice-President of Equity and Inclusion: Pavandeep Singh Josan
- Vice-President of Administration: Noah Nguyen-Hough
- Vice-President of Finance: Riley Talamantes
