= Housing at the University of Washington =

Coordinates: 47°39′21″N 122°19′01″W

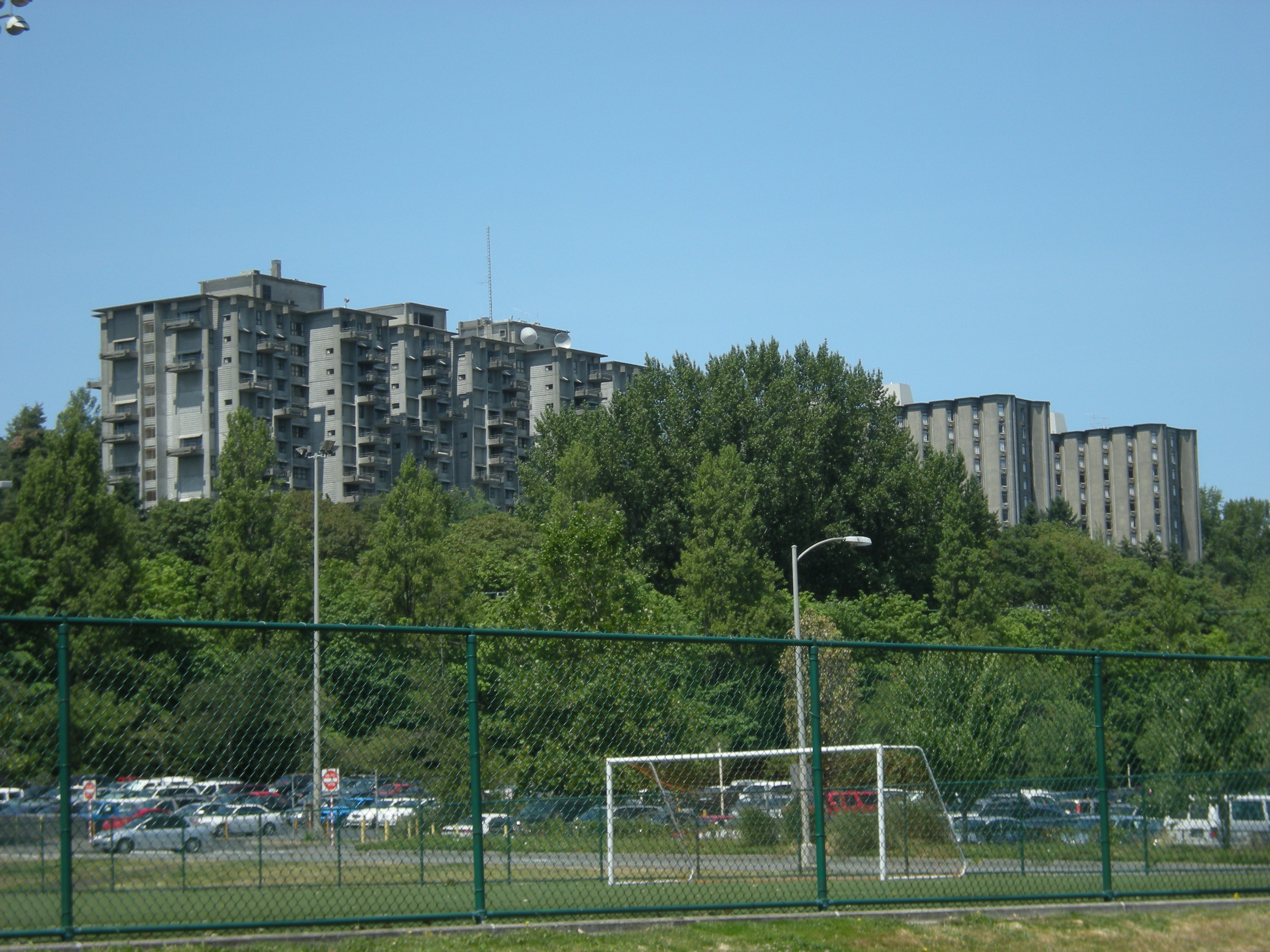
McMahon and Haggett Halls

Housing at the University of Washington is administered by the Housing & Food Services (HFS) department at the University of Washington. Undergraduates are housed primarily in residence halls located on North Campus and West Campus. Typically, residence halls are 9-month spaces for undergraduate students. However, there are also 12-month apartment spaces available for undergraduate students. Graduate and professional students are provided the option to live in 12-month apartments operated either by the university or privately. The University of Washington does not require students to live on campus. Although students are not required, about 71% of freshmen choose to live on campus. Housing is not guaranteed but placement in the residence halls is guaranteed for returning residents. Most winter quarter and spring quarter applicants are assigned housing. There are also three family housing options for registered full-time students at the Seattle campus.

Housing at the University of Washington is not limited to HFS. Fraternities and sororities at the University of Washington accommodate from 15 to 116 members. More than 1,000 freshmen a year live in the university's 50 fraternity and sorority houses.

== Residence halls ==
=== North Campus ===
North Campus includes the residence halls Hansee Hall, Madrona Hall, McCarty Hall, McMahon Hall, Oak Hall, and Willow Hall.

==== Haggett Hall ====
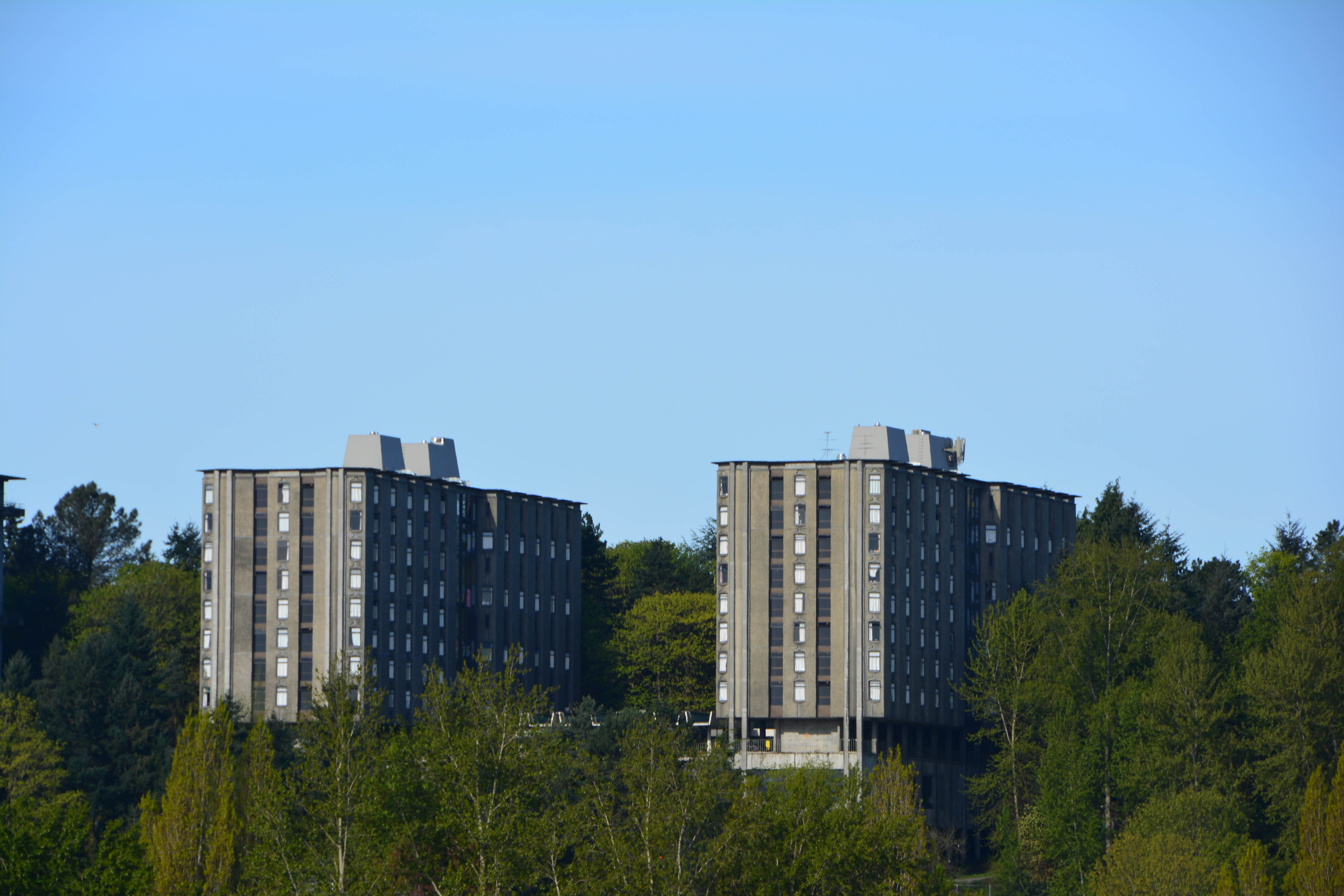
Haggett Hall as seen from the Burke Gilman Trail

Haggett Hall is a set of two towers located in the northeast section of the University of Washington campus. The set of buildings was named for Arthur Haggett (once Dean of the College of Liberal Arts), and his wife Winnifred Sunderlin Haggett (once the Dean of Women). The architects of Haggett Hall were Kirk, Wallace, McKinley and Associates.

Haggett Hall serves as one of the residence halls on the University of Washington campus. Each building contains a lobby and eight additional floors. Each floor contains approximately 25 rooms, most with the capacity to house two students. Each set of two floors shares a common "lounge", with the exception of the seventh and eighth floors of the towers, which each have their own. Haggett Hall is unique in that its rooms are in the shapes of hexagons, each with a triangular closet.

The towers were originally designed to separate the men and women. The women's tower was the north tower and the men's tower was the south tower. The evidence of this was found in the bathrooms; the south tower had urinals but the north tower did not. The bathrooms of the south tower were renovated in 2006. As of 1997, both towers were unisex.

Haggett Hall was the home of the Global Experience Living Learning Community, until it was closed in 2021. Due to increased demand for housing, Haggett Hall was temporarily reopened for the 2021-2022 academic year, before closing permanently in 2022. Demolition began in 2024, with a new Haggett Hall slated to open in fall 2027.

==== Hansee Hall ====
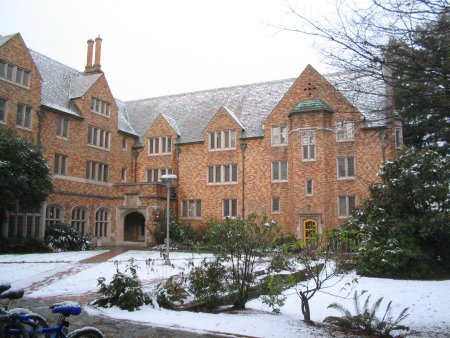
Hansee (Blaine) in the snow.

Hansee Hall is a building and student dormitory in Seattle, belonging to the University of Washington. Hansee Hall is the oldest residence hall at the university, and was constructed in the 1930s. It took its name in 1961, being named after Martha Lois Hansee. Hansee was a professor of Greek language and literature who taught at the university from 1881 to 1884 and again from 1895 to 1903. Its internal divisions consist of a narrow corridor attached to four different "Houses", Blaine, Austin, McKee and Leary. In 1936, all of these took their name from prominent Washingtonian women from the late nineteenth century and early twentieth century. During the Second World War, Hansee Hall was used by the U.S. military. The building imitates the red brick style of certain Ivy League schools, and otherwise has a mixture of Tudor and Collegiate Gothic architecture. The building is located off N.E. 45th Street in the north campus, just a short walk from nearby McCarty Hall. It is used as a residence hall to house undergraduates at the university, and mandates 24-hour quiet hours. It was once a women-only dorm, but is now unisex.

Hansee Hall has its own residence hall council called the Kingdom of Hansee. The hall council hosts an annual semi-formal ball open to all residence hall students at the university.

==== McMahon Hall ====
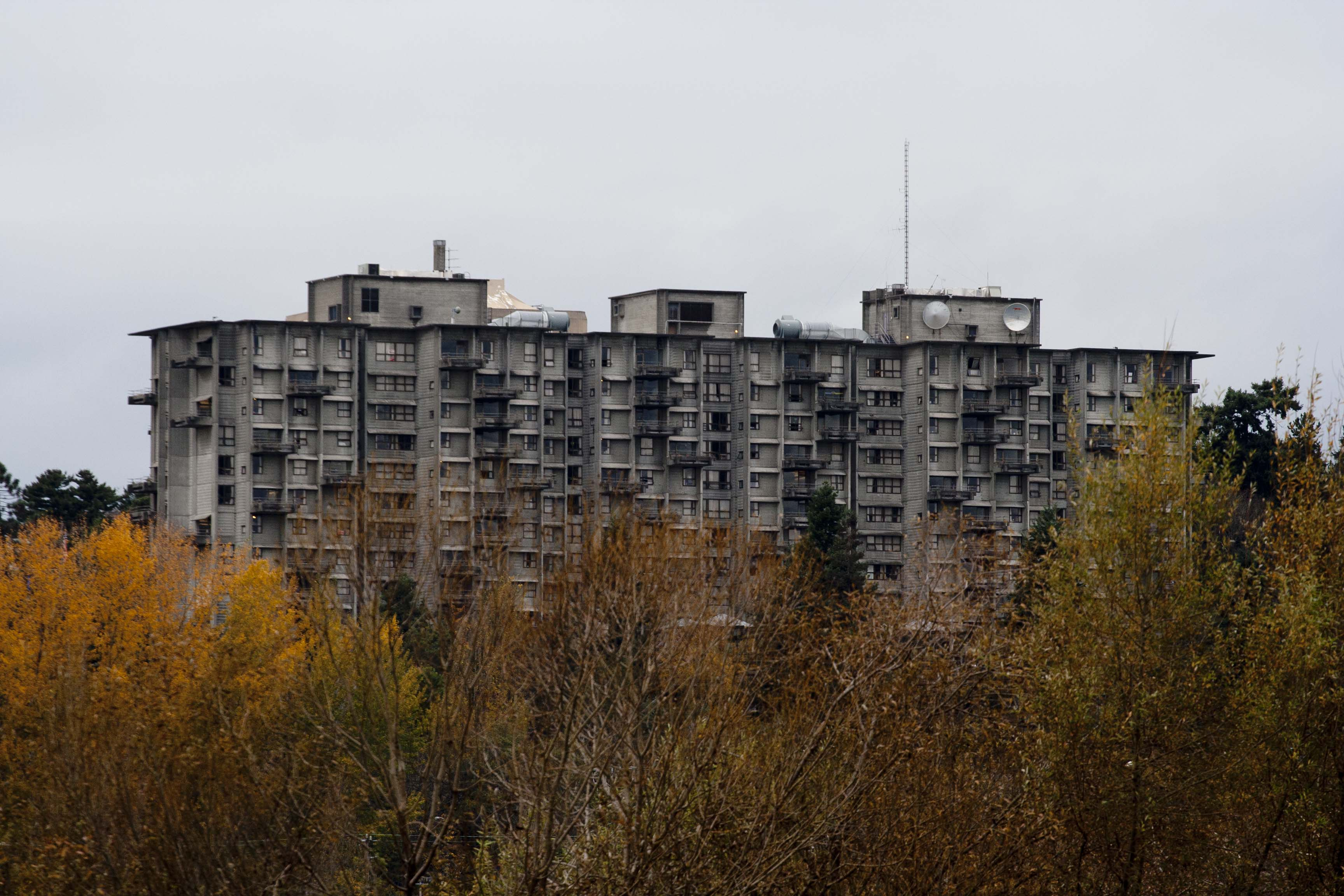
McMahon Hall

McMahon Hall is an 11-story brutalist-style dormitory, completed in 1965, adjacent to Haggett Hall.

McMahon Hall is currently under study. It may be remodeled and continue to be used as a residence hall, it may be converted to academic use or it may be demolished and replaced with another building.

The building consists of a North tower and a South tower. Each tower is then further broken down into 11 floors that each have their own "Clusters". Residents will be assigned to a room within a cluster and these clusters are typically made up of Doubles, with some singles. Each cluster has its own living space, including a common area, shared bathroom and a balcony. McMahon consists of 480 double room units with semi private bathroomsand 60 single room units with semi private bathrooms.

==== Spratlen Hall (Formerly Madrona Hall) ====
Spratlen Hall was opened to students Autumn 2018, formerly the land was occupied by the old McCarty Hall. Out of the three residence halls that were built including Madrona, Willow, and McCarty, this hall was designed and catered to provide an affordable option to students. This hall provides students different rooms options depending on personal preference and finances. There are 240 double room units that share a communal bathroom. There are 153 triple units with private bathrooms. There are 100 double units with private bathrooms, 20 four-person suite units with private bathrooms. There are 6 three-person units with private bathrooms, 4 single units with private bathrooms. A few amenities that are within this residence hall is Frost Bite, a student managed ice cream shop and the LRC (Learning Resource Center). Lounges, study spaces, group kitchens, dining areas, music practice rooms, laundry and storage rooms are distributed through the hall.

==== Oliver Hall (Formerly Willow Hall) ====
Oliver Hall was opened to students Autumn 2018, formerly the land was occupied by the old McCarty Hall. This hall provides many students different rooms options. There are 142 double room units with private bathrooms, 38 triple units with private bathrooms, 24 four-person suite units with private bathrooms,14 three-person units with private bathrooms, and 3 studio apartment units with private bathrooms. A few amenities that are within this residence hall is Center Table dining right below and the Willow Desk and their package lockers. Lounges, study spaces, group kitchens, dining areas, music practice rooms, laundry and storage rooms are distributed through the hall.

==== McCarty Hall ====
The former McCarty Hall constructed in the 1960s was demolished and constructed this newly built hall. The newer building of McCarty Hall was opened to students Autumn 2018. This hall provides students different rooms options. There are 197 triple room units with private bathrooms, 106 double units with private bathrooms, 21 four-person suite units with private bathrooms, 7 three-person suite units with private bathrooms, 6 studio apartment units with private bathrooms, and 4 single room units with private bathrooms. A few amenities that are within this residence hall includes the Maker Space and Engineering Lab. Lounges, study spaces, group kitchens, dining areas, music practice rooms, laundry and storage rooms are distributed through the hall.

==== Oak Hall ====
Oak Hall was newly constructed and opened to student Autumn 2021, located adjacent to the Denny Field. This hall provides students different rooms options. There are 128 double room units with private bathrooms,15 four-person suite units with private bathrooms, 9 three-person suite units with private bathrooms, and 2 studio apartment units with private bathrooms. A few amenities that are within this residence hall is the District Market that is coming soon which is located right below. This dormitory has the main part of double units then leads to a bridged building part which includes many of the suite and studio apartment units. Lounges, study spaces, group kitchens, dining areas, music practice rooms, laundry and storage rooms are distributed through the hall.

=== West Campus ===
West Campus includes the residence halls Alder Hall, Elm Hall, Lander Hall, Maple Hall, Poplar Hall, and Terry Hall. There are also 9-month apartment-style residence halls for undergraduates in Mercer Court and Stevens Court. Due to many different factors, the 9-month residence halls rates are being increased by 4.45% for the academic year of 2022–2023. The monthly price increase anywhere from $59 to $81.

==== Alder Hall ====
Alder Hall is on the west side of campus and is closer to the University District, commonly known as the Ave. This hall consists of a Pre-Health Sciences Living Learning Community. Within the hall itself, it has 232 double room units with private baths, 56 single room units with private baths, and 1 studio apartment with a private bath. This hall was constructed and built by 2012 and it includes many different amenities such as the District Market that is right below, the Husky Grind Cafe, many study rooms and auditorium facilities that are very accessible. This hall has a balance of study and student life resources and facilities. Lounges, study spaces, group kitchens, dining areas, music practice rooms, laundry and storage rooms are distributed through the hall.

==== Elm Hall ====
Elm Hall has 7 floors and it was constructed in 2012. The meaning behind the building named as Elm is that this residence hall was built around a mature America elm tree. This residence hall is shaped like an L. There are 108 triple room units with private bathrooms, 97 double room units with private bathrooms, 12 studio apartment units with private bathrooms. A few amenities that are within this residence hall is the Fitness Center West and Cultivate restaurant. Lounges, study spaces, group kitchens, dining areas, music practice rooms, laundry and storage rooms are distributed through the hall.

==== Lander Hall ====
Lander Hall was demolished and rebuilt between 2011 and 2016. Lander Hall is adjacent to Alder Hall. There are 40 triple room units with private bathrooms, 243 double room units with private bathrooms, 55 single room units with private bathrooms, and 6 studio apartment units with private bathrooms. A few amenities that are within this residence hall is Local Point dining in West Campus and Lander Desk. Lounges, study spaces, group kitchens, dining areas, music practice rooms, laundry and storage rooms are distributed through the hall. There is also a below grade parking garage that connects from Lander Hall to Maple and Terry Hall.

==== Maple Hall ====
Construction on Maple Hall began in January 2014. This residence hall was open to students the start of Autumn 2015 which. It is located adjacent to Terry and Lander Halls, between them. There are 130 triple room units with private bathrooms, 227 double room units with private bathrooms, 23 single room units with private bathrooms. A few amenities that are within this residence hall is the Area 01 Community Center, the maker and creative space and a living learning community of engineering. The Area 01 creative community center is for students to explore and utilize their resources such as the Dabble Lab, Sound Lab, Image Lab, and Game Lab. Lounges, study spaces, group kitchens, dining areas, music practice rooms, laundry and storage rooms are distributed through the hall.

==== Poplar Hall ====
Poplar Hall is adjacent to Elm Hall and was built on the land of the Playhouse Theatre and the UW Employment Office. Poplar hall was built following the economic collapse of 2008 and was constructed around 2011–2012. There are 130 double room units with private bathrooms and 6 studio apartment units with private bathrooms. A few amenities that are within this residence hall is the Learning Resource Center, home to the Leadership office, and a living learning community of global experience. Lounges, study spaces, group kitchens, dining areas, music practice rooms, laundry and storage rooms are distributed through the hall.

==== Terry Hall ====
Terry Hall was demolished, rebuilt, and fully constructed in the beginning of January 2014. This residence hall was open to students the start of Autumn 2015 which is adjacent to Maple Hall. There are 132 double room units with private bathrooms and 4 studio apartment units with private bathrooms. A few amenities that are within this residence hall is the rooftop space, the new HFS Central offices, housing facilities such as Financial Services, Capital Planning and Sustainability, Residential Life Administration, and Human resources. It includes a living learning community of honors. Several lounges, study spaces, group kitchens, dining areas, music practice rooms, laundry and storage rooms are distributed through the hall.

== Apartments ==
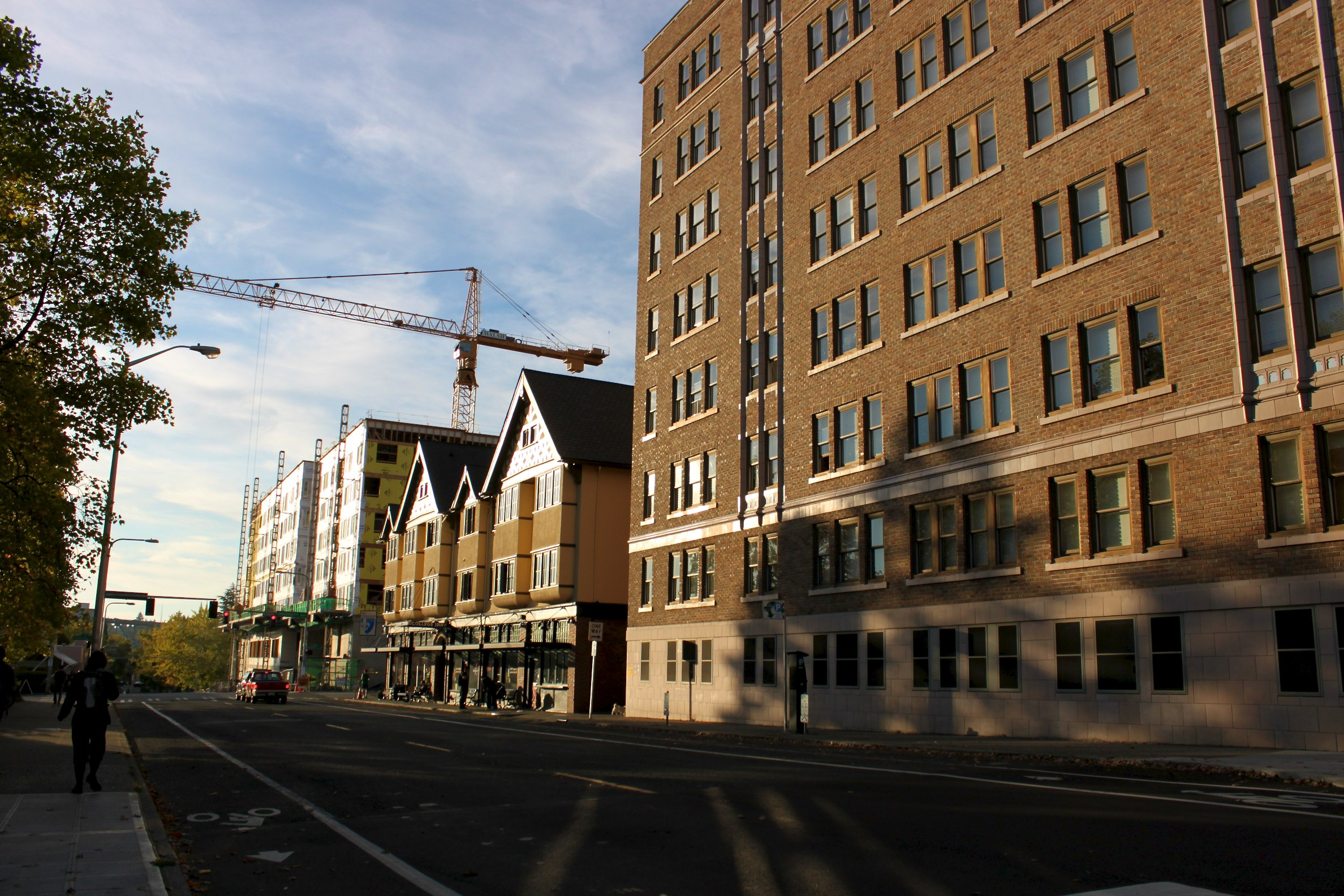
Alder Hall, College Inn, Commodore Duchess Apartments

There are a number of university-operated and privately operated twelve-month apartments available to students. They include Cedar Apartments, Commodore Duchess, Mercer Court D and E (graduate students only), Nordheim Court, and Radford Court. Stevens Court and Mercer Court A, B, and C are operated by Housing and Food Services, and provide nine-month apartments.

== Family housing ==
Blakeley Village and Laurel Village provide family housing for registered full-time students at the Seattle campus with dependent children. It is available to single parents and couples who are married or are registered same-sex domestic partners with children. They are located about one mile east of campus, near University Village.

There are also one-bedroom apartments in Stevens Court available to married couples or registered same-sex domestic partners, at least one of whom is enrolled as a full-time student at the Seattle campus.
