= University Book Store =

Independent book store in Seattle, Washington

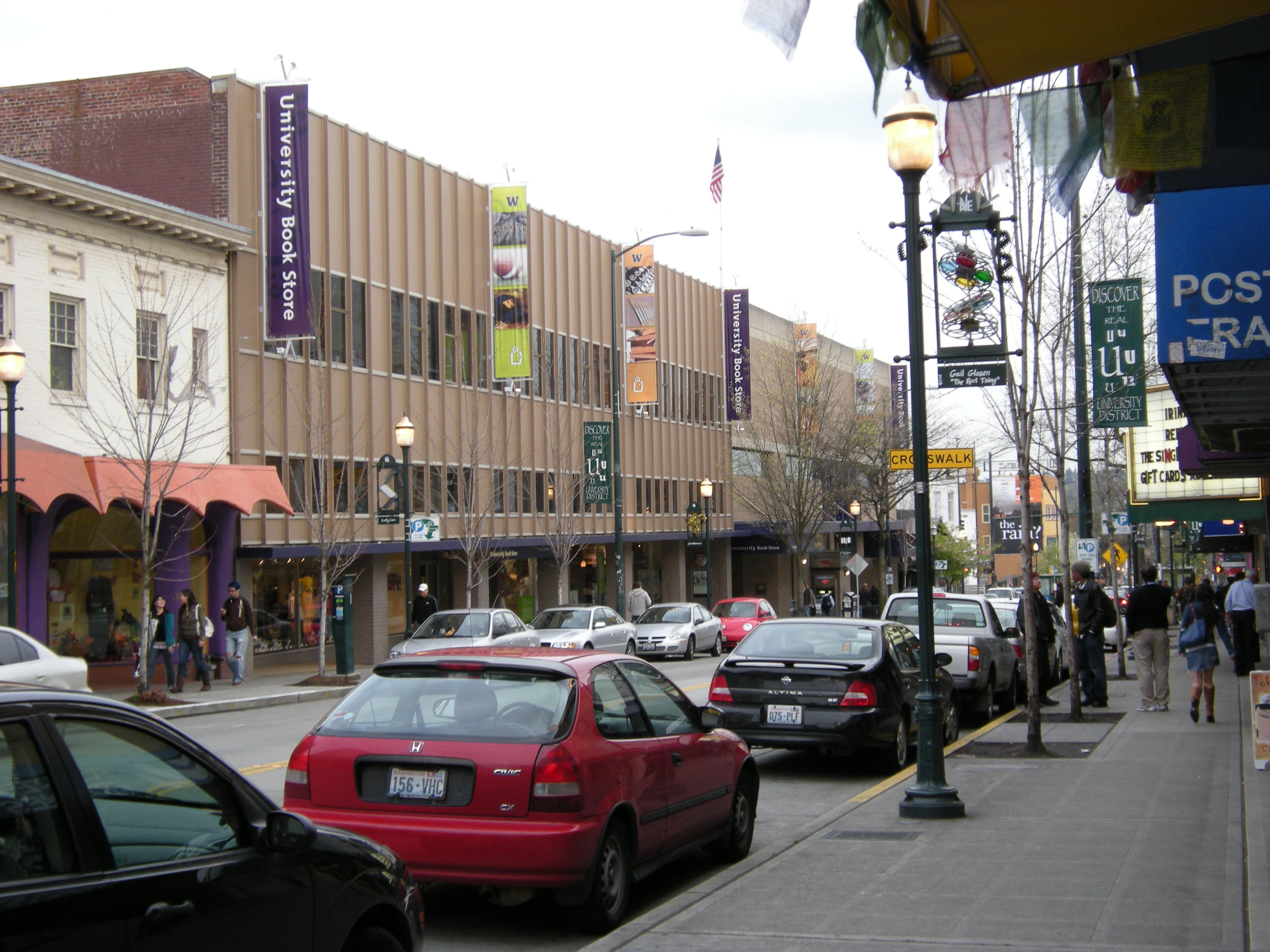
- Industry: Bookseller
- Founded: 1900
- Headquarters: Seattle, Washington, United States
- Website: ubookstore.com

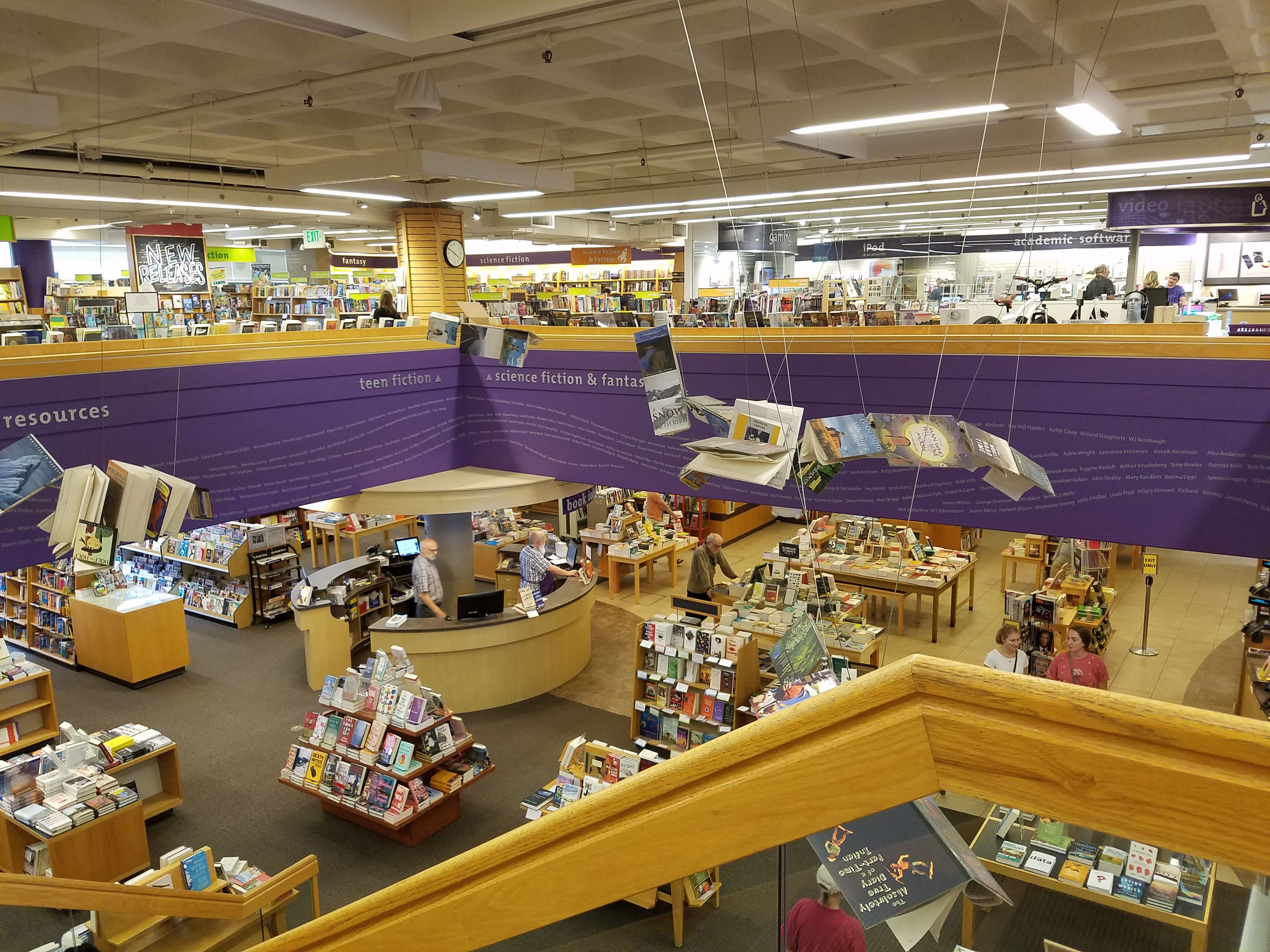
An interior view of the University Book Store in Seattle in 2018

University Book Store is an independent and privately owned bookstore headquartered in the University District of Seattle, Washington, United States. University Book Store began serving the University of Washington in 1900, and is the oldest and largest independent bookstore in Washington State.

In 2014, it was reported that University Book Store sold more books and supplies than any other college bookstore in the United States. In 2020, it was the third largest university bookstore in the country.

In addition to its main location, there are several other branches located on the University of Washington campus and elsewhere in western Washington state. A branch located in Bellevue, Washington closed in 2017.

As of July 2025, the General Books Department is operated by Barnes & Noble. The University Book Store continues to own and operate all other departments, including Textbooks, Student & Art Supplies, Husky Department, and Gifts.

== History ==
University Book Store opened in the University of Washington's Denny Hall in 1900. Its location moved several times on the campus over the years before moving to its present location on University Way in 1924.

The store was incorporated in 1932 and has been governed by a Board of Trustees since 1964. It is one of few college stores that is organized as an independent tax paying corporation with direct student involvement on the board of directors.

On May 20, 2025, the University Book Store confirmed that it would "continue to independently run all operations except for the trade books department," which would be taken over by Barnes & Noble.
