= Pagliacci Pizza =

Seattle-based restaurant chain

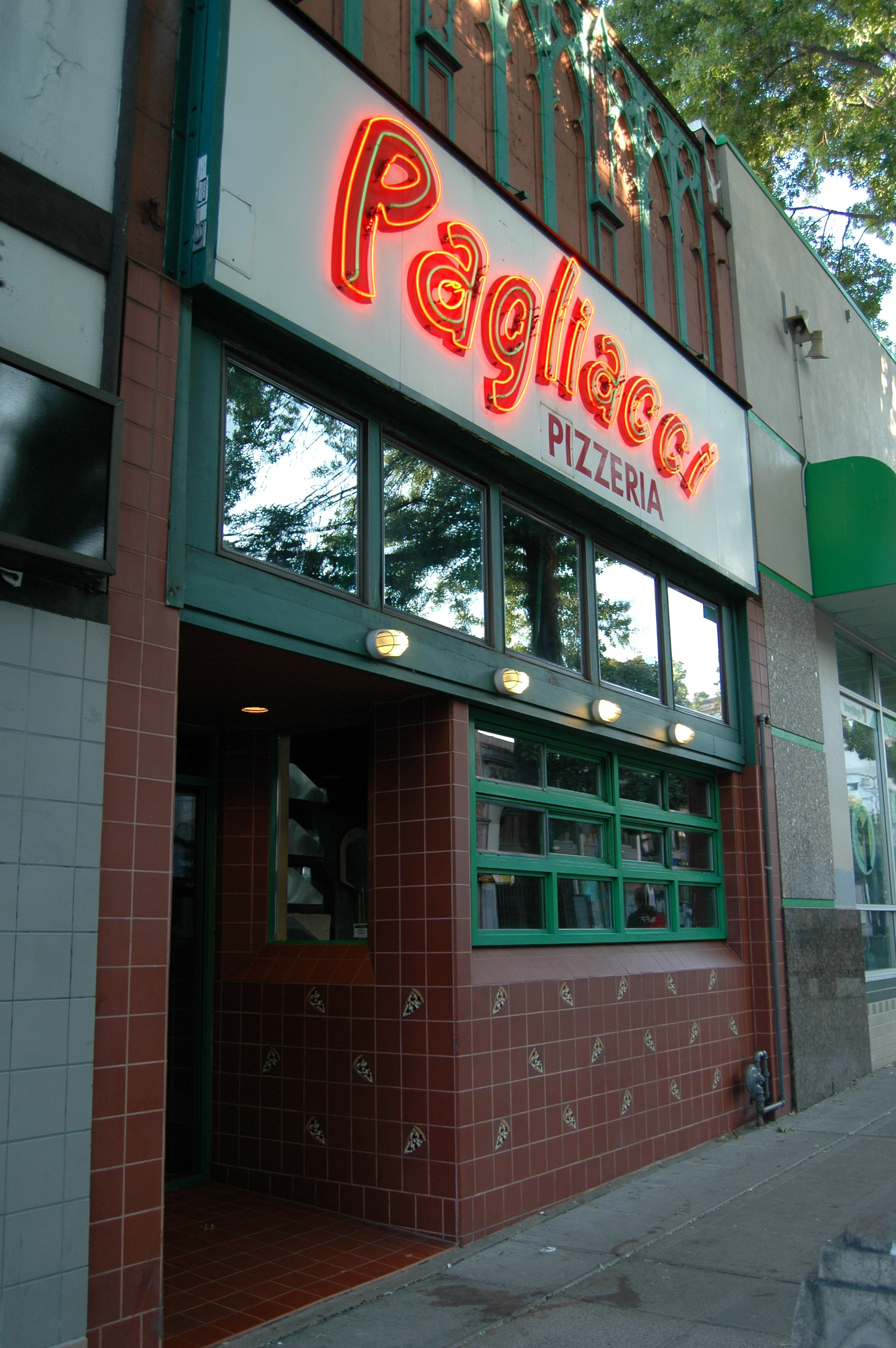
- Pagliacci Pizza's original location on The Ave in Seattle's University District opened in 1979.
- Founded: 1979; 47 years ago in Seattle
- Headquarters: Seattle, WA
- Owner: Matt Galvin; Pat McDonald
- Number of employees: 802 (2018)

Pagliacci Pizza is a Seattle-based pizza chain. It has 24 locations in King County and Snohomish counties, primarily in the city of Seattle.

The first Pagliacci Pizza location opened on February 19, 1979, at 4529 University Way in Seattle's University District. Over the years, this location underwent many face-lifts and remodeling changes until that location's closure in July 2018. The chain offers delivery, sit-down dining, and pizza by the slice bars. An interior decor staple for the local chain is Italian-language movie posters. On November 1, 2012, Pagliacci Pizza opened Seattle's first stand-alone LEED-certified pizzeria in the Madison Park neighborhood.

== Social presence ==
In recent years, Pagliacci Pizza has made an effort to be more eco-friendly, using compostable boxes and packaging, and purchasing green-power offsets from Seattle City Light and Puget Sound Energy. Since 2011, Pagliacci Pizza's boxes have been made using materials from Forest Stewardship Council-certified local forests and post-consumer recycled fiber. The chain's Wallingford, Madison Park and Old Bellevue locations were built using sustainably-sourced materials.

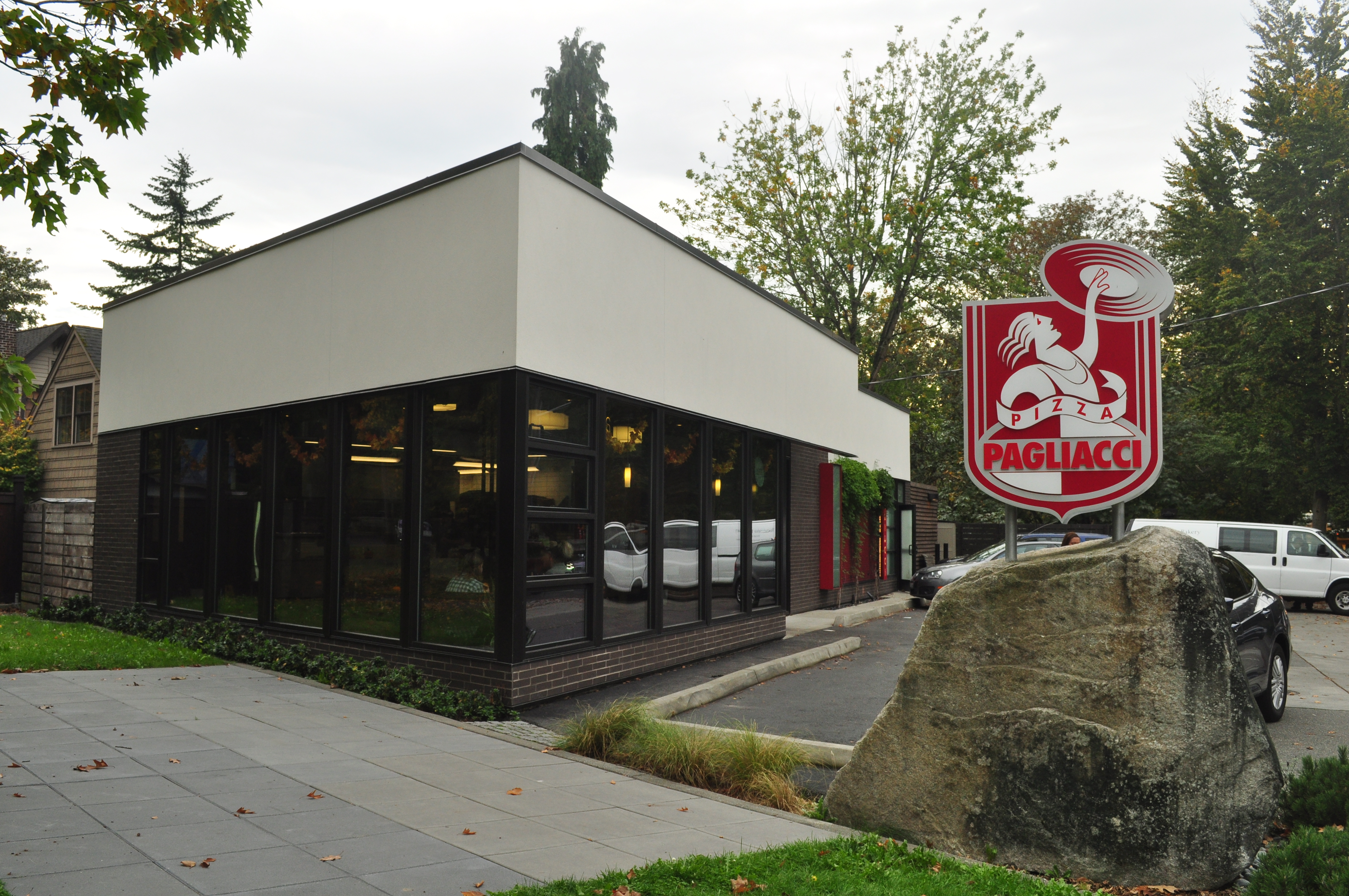
The LEED-certified Pagliacci Pizza in Madison Park
