= Tricia Serio =

American academic

- Education: Lehigh University; Yale University
- Scientific career
- Workplaces: Brown University; Yale University; UMass Amherst; University of Arizona; University of Washington

Tricia Serio is an American molecular biologist and an elected Fellow of the American Association for the Advancement of Science. She is the provost and executive vice president for academic affairs at the University of Washington. She assumed these roles in 2023.

== Academic career ==
Serio earned a bachelor’s degree in molecular biology at Lehigh University. She completed a master’s degree and Ph.D. at Yale. After a postdoc at the University of Chicago and at Yale, Serio joined the faculty of Brown University in 2002. In 2016 she started Speak Your Story, which is a project that documents subtle examples of sexism in science.

Serio's career in administration started when she became head of the University of Arizona department of Molecular And Cellular Biology. Later Serio became the dean of the College of Natural Sciences at UMass in 2017. Five years later she became provost and senior vice chancellor for Academic Affairs at UMass Amherst.

== Research ==
Serio’s research has focused on prion proteins. This work has relevance to neurodegenerative diseases in mammals and how to reverse them.

== Awards and honors ==
Serio was elected as a Fellow of the American Association for the Advancement of Science in 2022. Serio has won several honors for her research. These include the 2016 Mid-career Award for Excellence in Research from the American Society for Cell Biology. She also was named a Pew Scholar in 2003. Serio also won the National Cancer Institute’s Howard Temin Award.
