= University of Washington =

Public university in Seattle, Washington, US

- Former name: Territorial University of Washington (1861–1889)
- Motto: Lux sit (Latin)
- Motto in English: "Let there be light"
- Type: Public research university
- Established: November 4, 1861; 165 years ago
- Accreditation: NWCCU
- Academic affiliations: AAU; APRU; COP; UARC; UArctic; URA; USU; space-grant; sea-grant
- Endowment: $5.96 billion (2025)
- Budget: $11.75 billion (FY 2024)
- President: Robert J. Jones
- Provost: Tricia Serio
- Faculty: 5,803
- Administrative staff: 16,174
- Total staff: 34,668 campus & health system employees
- Students: 51,719 (fall 2024)
- Undergraduates: 35,397 (fall 2024)
- Postgraduates: 16,322 (fall 2024)
- Location: Seattle, Washington, U.S. 47°39′15″N 122°18′29″W
- Campus: 807 acres (3.3 km^{2}) (total); Large city
- Other campuses: Bothell; Tacoma; Online
- Newspaper: The Daily of the University of Washington
- Colors: Purple and gold
- Nickname: Huskies
- Sporting affiliations: NCAA Division I FBS – Big Ten; MPSF
- Mascots: Harry the Husky; Dubs (live Malamute)
- Website: washington.edu

The University of Washington (UW, (Note: The university prefers "the UW" over simply "UW" in noun form, though independent sources often use the abbreviation with no article. For consistency, this article uses the simple form "UW".) and informally U-Dub or U Dub (Note: "Dub" is a phonetic shorthand for the letter W.)) is a public research university in Seattle, Washington, United States. Founded in 1861, it is one of the oldest universities on the West Coast of the United States.

The university has a 700-acre (2.8 km^{2}) main campus in the city's University District, with satellite campuses in nearby cities of Tacoma and Bothell. Overall, UW encompasses more than 500 buildings and over 20 million gross square footage of space, including one of the largest library systems in the world with more than 26 university libraries, art centers, museums, laboratories, lecture halls, and stadiums.

Washington is the flagship institution of the state's six public universities. Known for its medical, engineering, and scientific research, Washington is a member of the Association of American Universities. According to the National Science Foundation, UW spent $1.73 billion on research and development in 2024, ranking it fifth in the nation. Its 22 varsity sports teams compete as the Huskies in the Big Ten Conference of NCAA Division I.

== History ==
=== Founding ===
In 1854, territorial governor Isaac Stevens recommended the establishment of a university in the Washington Territory. Prominent Seattle-area residents, including Methodist preacher Daniel Bagley, saw this as a chance to add to the city's potential and prestige. Bagley learned of a law that allowed United States territories to sell land to raise money in support of public schools. At the time, Arthur A. Denny, one of the founders of Seattle and a member of the territorial legislature, aimed to increase the city's importance by moving the territory's capital from Olympia to Seattle. However, Bagley ultimately persuaded Denny that founding a university would better contribute to the growth of Seattle's economy. Two universities were initially chartered, but later the decision was repealed in favor of a single university in Lewis County provided that locally donated land was available. When no site emerged, Denny successfully petitioned the legislature to reconsider Seattle as a location in 1858.

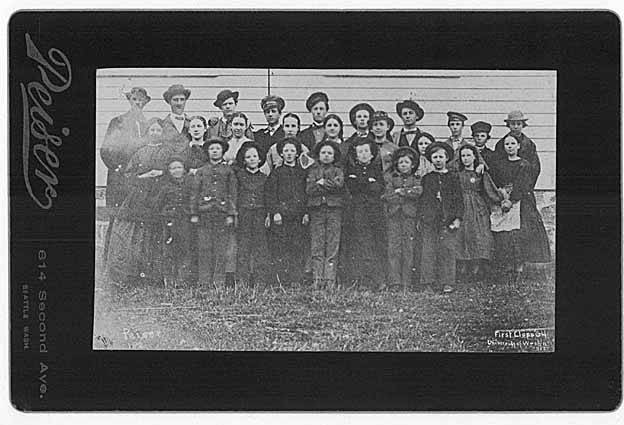
Territorial University students in 1864

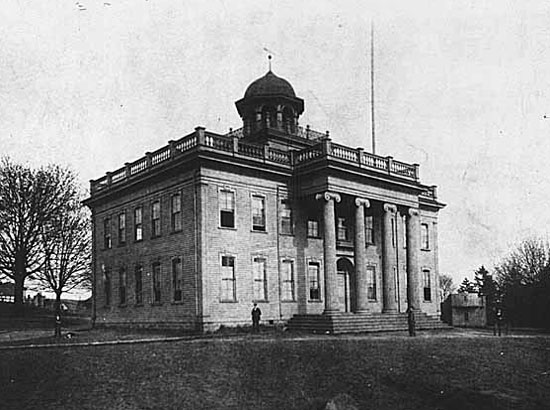
The original University building, c. 1870

In 1861, scouting began for an appropriate 10 acres (4 ha) site in Seattle to serve as a new university campus. Arthur and Mary Denny donated eight acres, while fellow pioneers Edward Lander, and Charlie and Mary Terry, donated two acres on Denny's Knoll in downtown Seattle. More specifically, this tract was bounded by 4th Avenue to the west, 6th Avenue to the east, Union Street to the north, and Seneca Streets to the south.

John Pike, for whom Pike Street is named, was the university's architect and builder. It was opened on November 4, 1861, as the Territorial University of Washington. The legislature passed articles incorporating the university, and establishing its Board of Regents in 1862. The school initially struggled, closing three times: in 1863 for low enrollment, and again in 1867 and 1876 for shortage of funds. Washington awarded its first graduate Clara Antoinette McCarty Wilt in 1876, with a Bachelor of Science degree.

=== 19th-century relocation ===
By the time Washington state entered the Union in 1889, both Seattle and the university had grown substantially. Washington's total undergraduate enrollment increased from 30 to nearly 300 students, and the campus's relative isolation in downtown Seattle faced encroaching development. A special legislative committee, headed by UW graduate Edmond Meany, was created to find a new campus to better serve the growing student population and faculty. The committee eventually selected a site on the northeast of downtown Seattle called Union Bay, which was historically the land of the Duwamish, and the legislature appropriated funds for its purchase and construction. In 1895, the university relocated to the new campus by moving into the newly built Denny Hall. The University Regents tried and failed to sell the old campus, eventually settling with leasing the area. This later became one of the university's most valuable pieces of real estate in modern-day Seattle, generating millions in annual revenue with what is now called the Metropolitan Tract. The original Territorial University building was torn down in 1908, and its former site now houses the Fairmont Olympic Hotel.

The sole-surviving remnants of Washington's first building are four 24-foot (7.3 m), white, hand-fluted cedar, Ionic columns. They were salvaged by Edmond S. Meany, one of the university's first graduates and former head of its history department. Meany and his colleague, Dean Herbert T. Condon, dubbed the columns as "Loyalty," "Industry," "Faith", and "Efficiency", or "LIFE." The columns now stand in the Sylvan Grove Theater.

=== 20th-century expansion ===
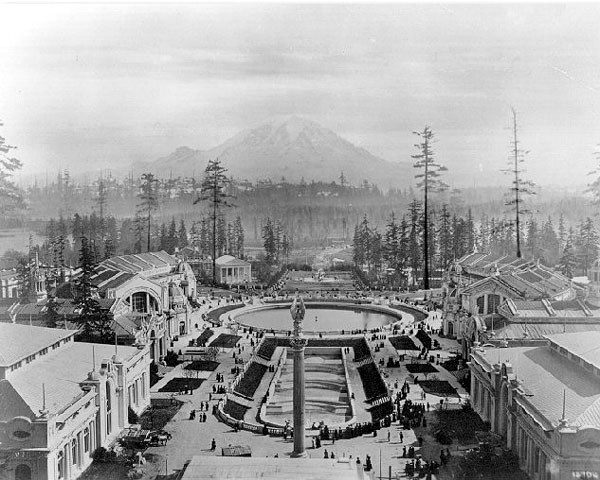
Alaska–Yukon–Pacific Exposition on the UW campus toward Mount Rainier in 1909

Organizers of the 1909 Alaska–Yukon–Pacific Exposition eyed the still largely undeveloped campus as a prime setting for their world's fair. They came to an agreement with Washington's Board of Regents that allowed them to use the campus grounds for the exposition, surrounding today's Drumheller Fountain facing towards Mount Rainier. In exchange, organizers agreed Washington would take over the campus and its development after the fair's conclusion. This arrangement led to a detailed site plan and several new buildings, prepared in part by John Charles Olmsted. The plan was later incorporated into the overall UW campus master plan, permanently affecting the campus layout.

Both World Wars brought the military to campus, with certain facilities temporarily lent to the federal government. In spite of this, subsequent post-war periods were times of dramatic growth for the university. The period between the wars saw a significant expansion of the upper campus. Construction of the Liberal Arts Quadrangle, known to students as "The Quad," began in 1916 and continued to 1939. The university's architectural centerpiece, Suzzallo Library, was built in 1926 and expanded in 1935.

In 1942, all persons of Japanese ancestry in the Seattle area were forced into inland internment camps as part of Executive Order 9066 following the attack on Pearl Harbor. During this difficult time, university president Lee Paul Sieg took an active and sympathetic leadership role in advocating for and facilitating the transfer of Japanese American students to universities and colleges away from the Pacific Coast to help them avoid the mass incarceration. Nevertheless, many Japanese American students and "soon-to-be" graduates were unable to transfer successfully in the short time window or receive diplomas before being incarcerated. It was only many years later that they were recognized for their accomplishments, during the University of Washington's Long Journey Home ceremonial event that was held in May 2008.

On October 2, 1946, the University of Washington formally opened a medical school as part of a School of Health Sciences against the Washington State Medical Association's oppositions, who did not wish to create a competitive surplus of physicians. The operation was spearheaded by President Henry Suzzallo based on plans created by Gideon Weed, Rufus Willard, and Thomas Minor earlier in 1884. The G.I. Bill was later created and passed, establishing the School of Health Sciences while providing $3.75 million for buildings and $450,000 for salaries. This was the foundation for the University of Washington Medical Center, ranked by U.S. News & World Report as one of the top ten hospitals in the nation. The School of Health Sciences was later renamed the School of Medicine in 1946, which is now consistently ranked as the top medical school in the United States. The University of Washington's role as a medical school sharply drew more attention after the World War II boom in wartime industry and economics.

J. Robert Oppenheimer was nominated in 1954 by the University of Washington's Physics Department to lecture physics students for one week, but was unable to attend because of loyalty checks asked for by the US Federal Government. Oppenheimer never accepted the invitations, and President Dr. Henry Schmitz disapproved of his nomination.

From 1958 to 1973, the University of Washington saw a tremendous growth in student enrollment, its faculties and operating budget, and also its prestige under the leadership of Charles Odegaard. During this period, the faculty was sharply divided over the issues of the role of the faculty in faculty appointments, and the conflict of who should run the University, the faculty or the parents and taxpayers. Henry Schmitz characterized the matter as "an internal power struggle." UW student enrollment had more than doubled to 34,000 as the baby boom generation came of age.

The University of Washington has a long history with civil rights starting from 1874, through 1899 with civil activism and through 1968 to 1975. This era was also marked by high levels of student activism, as was the case at many American universities. Much of the unrest focused around civil rights, actively seen when football coach Jim Owens suspended four Black football players on October 30, 1969, for "[a] lack of commitment to the team," after which activists demanded Owen's resignation and the rest of the black football players on the team refused to play. For a time, activists had been passionate as to incite a response from school administration to occupy the campus after the activists harmed 17 persons. African American Dr. Robert Flennaugh was appointed to the UW Board of Regents on March 25, 1970 and later on June 22 the University of Washington Daily eliminated gender-based help ads. Activism peaked in 1975 when 2,000 students protested university hiring practices on the campus through May 13 and 14. Further opposition to the Vietnam War occurred, and in response to anti-Vietnam War protests by the late 1960s, the University Safety and Security Division became the University of Washington Police Department. On June 29, 1969, a bomb detonated on campus, causing $100,000 in damages and no injuries. No group claimed responsibility for the incident.

Odegaard instituted a vision of building a "community of scholars", convincing the Washington State legislatures to increase investment in the university. Washington senators, such as Henry M. Jackson and Warren G. Magnuson, also used their political clout to gather research funds for UW. The results included an increase in the operating budget from $37 million in 1958 to over $400 million in 1973, solidifying UW as a top recipient of federal research funds in the United States. The establishment of technology giants such as Microsoft, Boeing and Amazon in the local area also proved to be highly influential in the UW's fortunes, not only improving graduate prospects but also helping to attract millions of dollars in university and research funding through its distinguished faculty and extensive alumni network.

=== 21st century ===
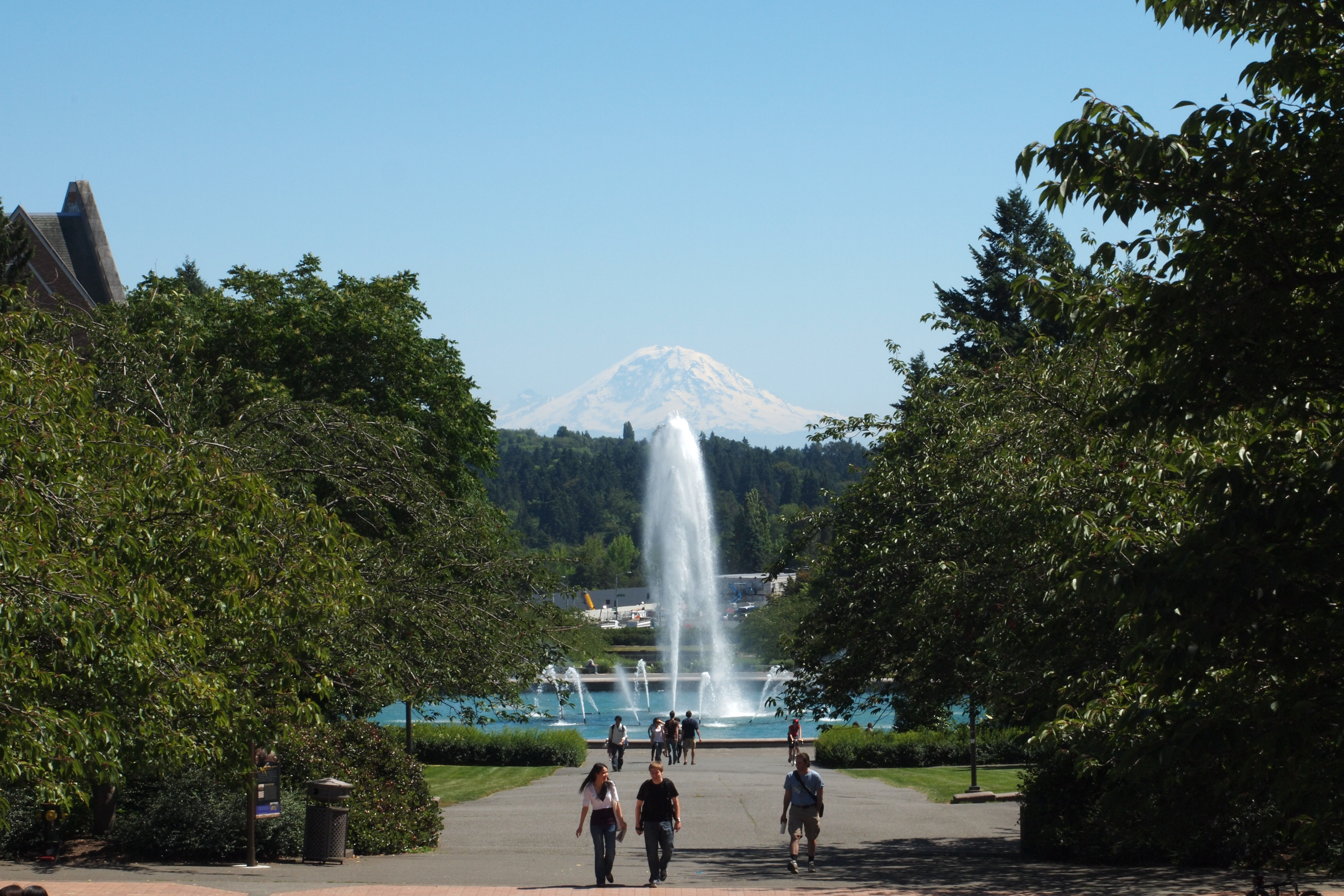
Mount Rainier viewed from Drumheller Fountain

In 1990, the University of Washington opened its additional campuses in Bothell and Tacoma. Originally designed for students who had completed two years of higher education, both schools have since evolved into four-year universities with the authority to award degrees. The first freshman classes were admitted in the fall of 2006. Today, both the Bothell and Tacoma campuses also offer a range of master's degree programs.

In 2012, the university began exploring plans and governmental approval to expand the main Seattle campus, including significant increases in student housing, teaching facilities for the growing student body and faculty, as well as expanded public transit options. The University of Washington light rail station was completed in March 2016, connecting Seattle's Capitol Hill neighborhood to the UW Husky Stadium within five minutes of rail travel time. It offers a previously unavailable option of transportation into and out of the campus, designed specifically to reduce dependence on private vehicles, bicycles and local King County buses.

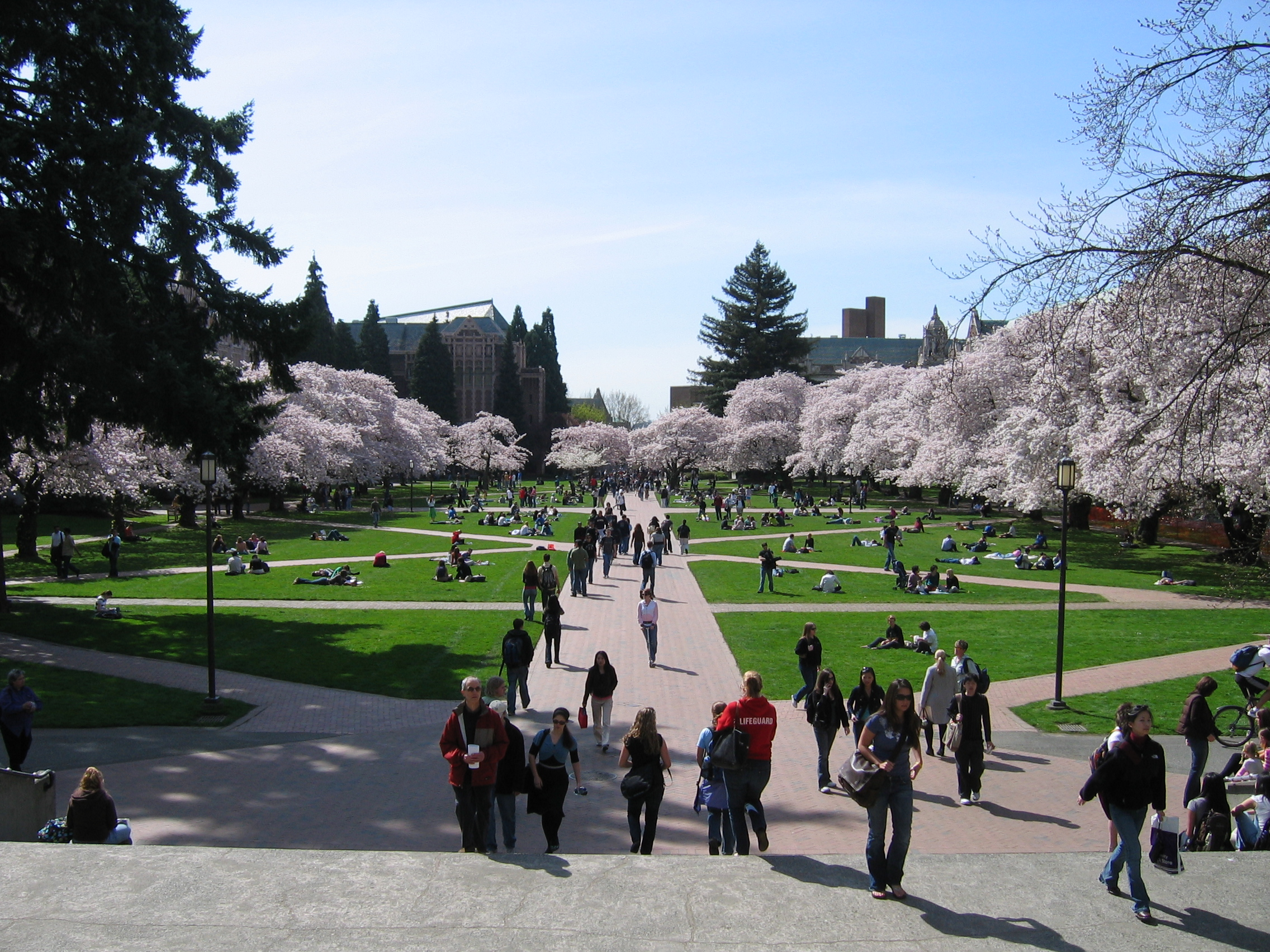
The UW Quad pictured in 2007

=== Controversies ===
On January 23, 1939, the University of Washington was criticized for hiring Economics Professor Harold J. Laski, a British Marxist, as a visiting lecturer in between the First Red Scare and Second Red Scare. The University of Washington was highly suspect by the Truman Administration in 1948 and 1949. Thomas H. Bienz, a Democratic State senator, declared that "At least 150 [University faculty members] are Communists" and soon thereafter two investigations were started by the Canwell Committee and the University. Professor of philosophy Herbert Phillips, professor of old English literature Joe Butterworth and professor of social psychology Ralph Gundlach were dismissed after the investigations. A year after, another second investigation was commenced by the Joint Legislative Fact-finding Committee on Un-American Activities in the State of Washington, leading to investigations into other professors with a response of "One hundred and three professors [signing] an open letter to the University of Washington Board of Regents that stated the firings were based on guilt by association. The letter also declared that faculty morale and the University's reputation was damaged."

The original proposal of the University included increases for research scientists of about 10% over three years plus changes in the pay structure and a catch-up increase of 3.25% for those who did not get a merit raise last year. For postdocs, the original UW offer was an average 15% total wage increase in 2023, including 13% in January when new minimums were introduced, plus higher minimum salaries.

== Campus ==
UW's main campus is situated in Seattle, by the shores of Union and Portage Bays with views of the Cascade Range to the east, and the Olympic Mountains to the west. The site encompasses 700 acres (2.8 km^{2}) bounded by N.E. 45th Street on the north, N.E. Pacific Street on the south, Montlake Boulevard N.E. on the east, and 15th Avenue N.E. on the west.

Red Square is the heart of the campus, surrounded by landmark buildings and artworks, such as Suzzallo Library, the Broken Obelisk, and the statue of George Washington. It functions as the central hub for students and hosts a variety of events annually. University Way, known locally as "The Ave", lies nearby and is a focus for much student life at the university.

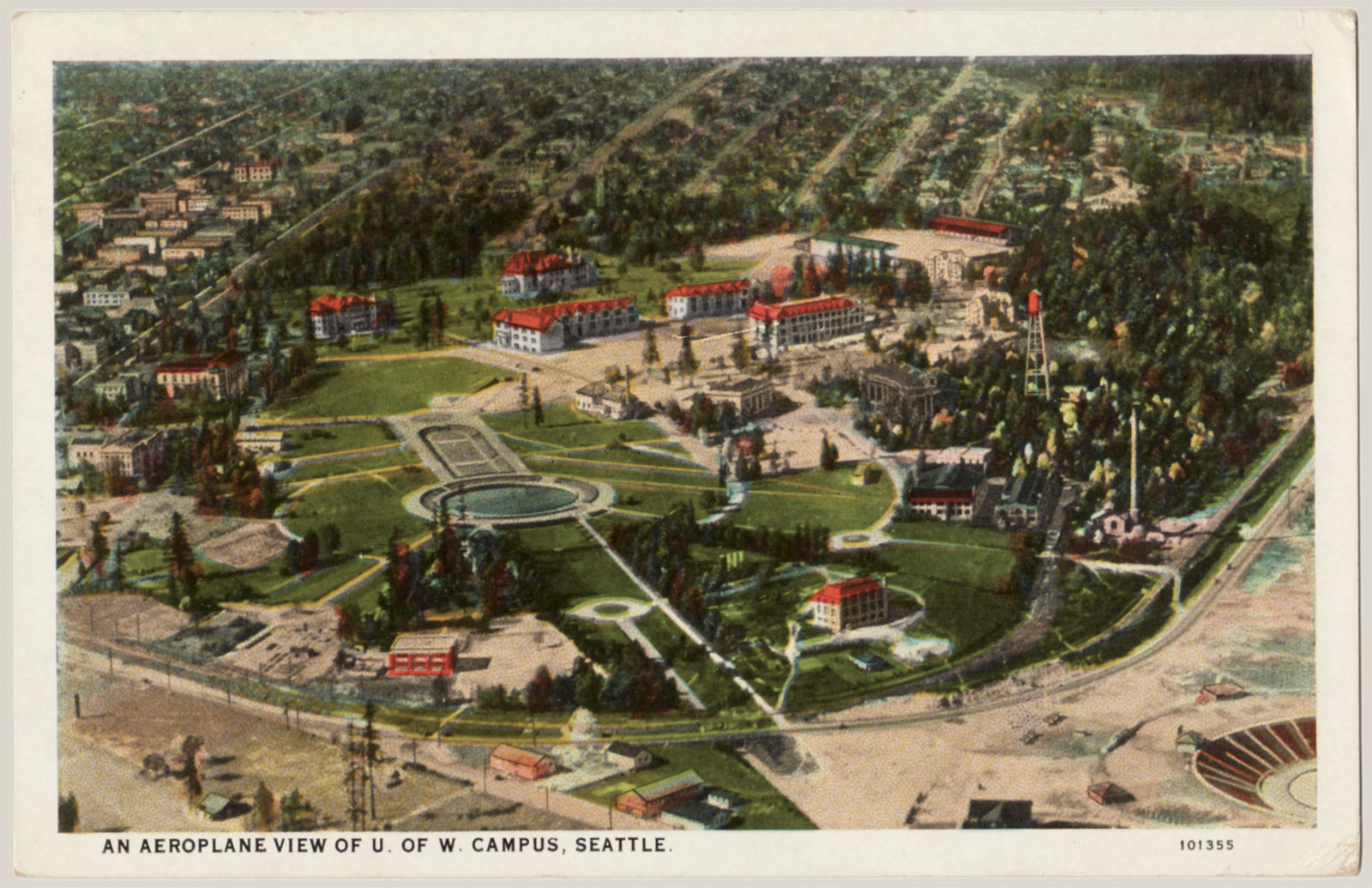
Aerial view of campus, c. 1922

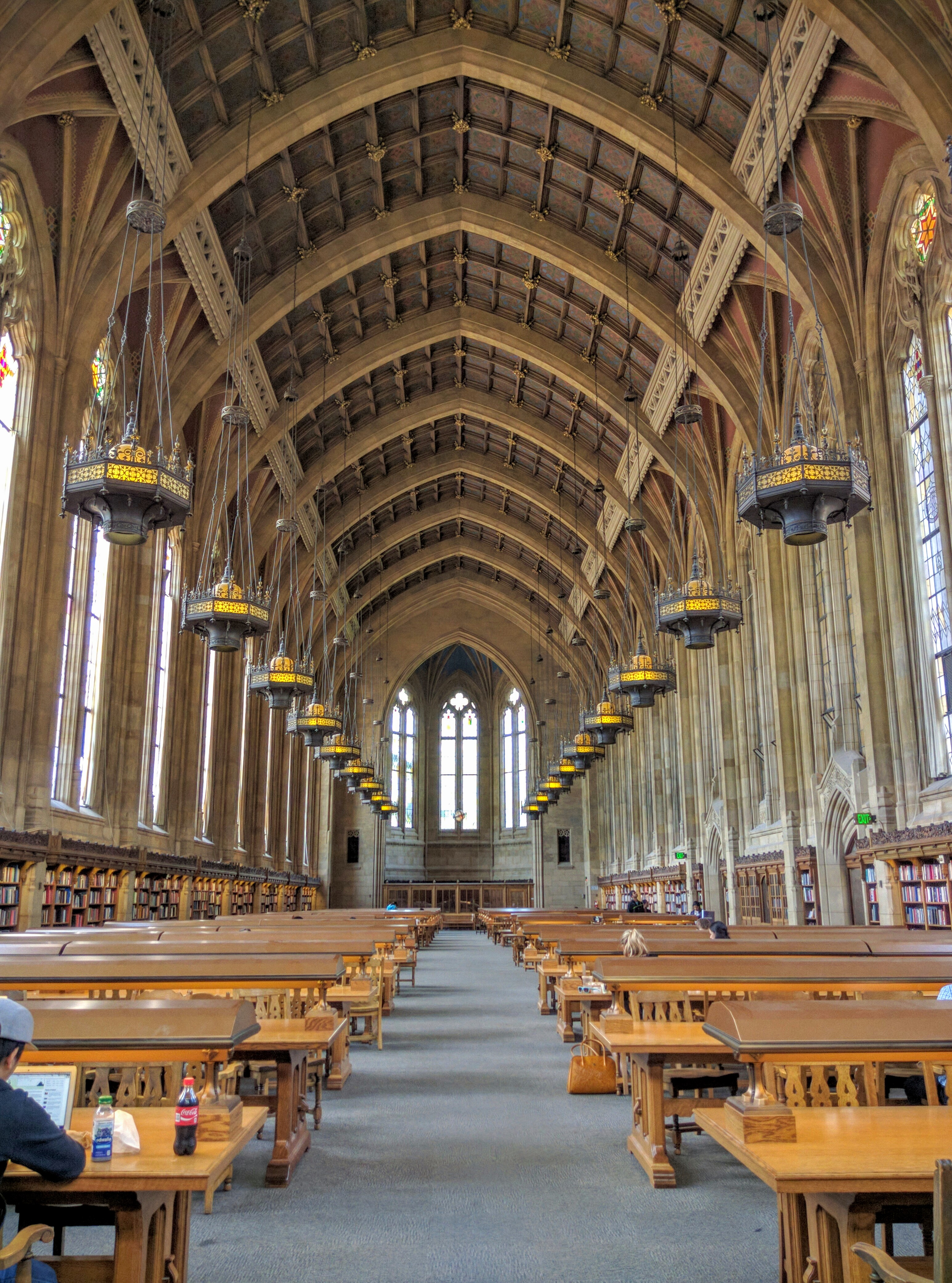
The university's landmark reading room, inside Suzzallo Library

=== North Campus ===
North Campus features some of UW's most recognized landscapes as well as landmarks, stretching from the signature University of Washington Quad directly north of Red Square to N.E. 45th Street, and encompasses a number of the university's most historical academic, research, housing, parking, recreational and administrative buildings. With UW's continued growth, administrators proposed a new, multimillion-dollar, multi-phase development plan in late 2014 to refine portions of the North Campus, renovating and replacing old student housing with new LEED-certified complexes, introducing new academic facilities, sports fields, open greenery, and museums. The UW Foster School of Business, School of Law, and the Burke Museum of Natural History and Culture, which houses a significant number of exhibits including a 66-million-year-old Tyrannosaurus rex fossil skull – one of only 15 known to exist in the world today and part of an ongoing excavation, are also located in North Campus. The U District light rail station is just west of the Burke Museum.

=== South Campus ===
South Campus occupies the land between Pacific Street and the Lake Washington Ship Canal. The land was previously the site of the University Golf Course but was given up to construct a building for the School of Medicine. Today, South Campus is the location of UW's health sciences and natural sciences facilities, including the UW Medical Center and the Magnuson Health Sciences Center as well as locations for instruction and research in oceanography, bioengineering, biology, genome sciences, hydraulics, and comparative medicine.

=== East Campus ===
The East Campus area stretches east of Montlake Boulevard to Laurelhurst and is largely taken up by wetlands and Huskies sports facilities and recreation fields, including Husky Stadium, Hec Edmundson Pavilion, and Husky Ballpark. The area directly north of the sports facilities is home to UW's computer science and engineering programs, which includes computer labs once used by Paul G. Allen and Bill Gates for their prior venture before establishing Microsoft. In 2019, the Bill & Melinda Gates Center For Computer Science & Engineering opened in East Campus. Located adjacent is the Mechanical Engineering Building, home to the Industrial and Systems Engineering program. The area northeast of the sports facilities is occupied by components of the UW Botanic Gardens, such as the Union Bay Natural Area, the UW Farm, and the Center for Urban Horticulture. Further east is the Ceramic and Metal Arts Building and Laurel Village, which provides family housing for registered full-time students. East Campus is also the location of the UW light rail station.

=== West Campus ===
West Campus consists of mainly modernist structures located on city streets, and stretches between 15th Avenue and Interstate 5 from the Ship Canal, to N.E. 41st Street. It is home to the College of Built Environments, School of Social Work, Fishery Sciences Building, Applied Physics Laboratory, UW Police Department as well as many of the university's apartments such as Stevens Court and Mercer Court and residence halls Alder, Lander, Maple and Elm Hall.

== Organization and administration ==
=== Board of Regents ===
The University of Washington Board of Regents governs the University of Washington per the Revised Code of Washington 28B.20.130 statute. The board is responsible for selecting, overseeing, and assessing the university president. Generally, the Board of Regents entrusts the president with the daily operations of the university, in collaboration with the faculty and in line with legal provisions.

The Board of Regents is made up of eleven members, including one student member and one faculty member. Regents are appointed by the governor of the State of Washington for six-year terms, except for the Student Regent (who serves for one year) and the Faculty Regent (who serves for three years). Regents continue to serve after their terms have ended until either they resign or the governor appoints a successor. Officers of the board are elected annually at the September meeting.

One of the most notable former regents is William Henry Gates II, the father of Bill Gates. William Henry Gates II served as a regent from 1997 to 2012.

=== President ===
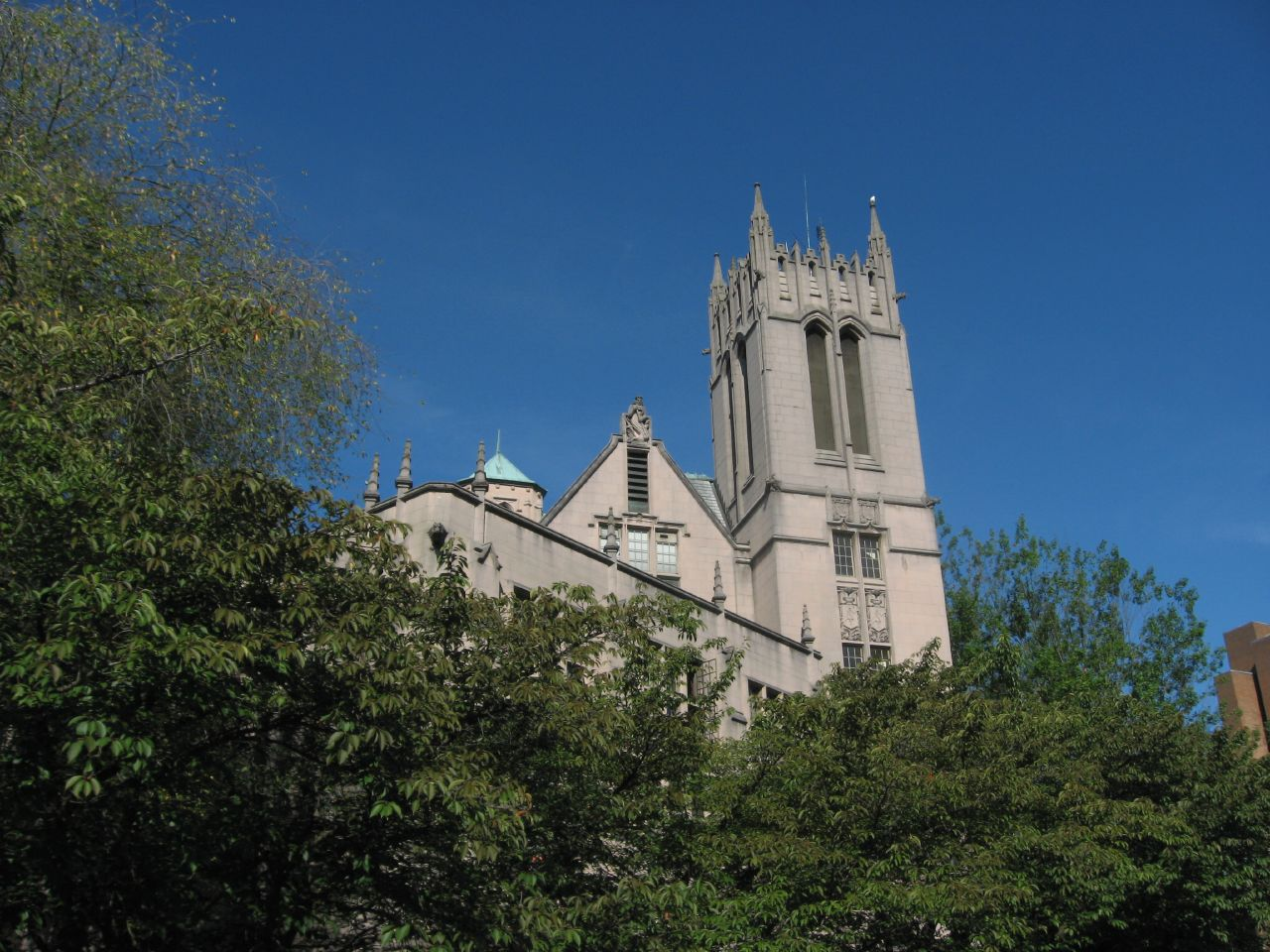
The Gothic-revival Gerberding Hall houses offices, including that of the president and provost

On February 3, 2025, the Board of Regents announced that Robert J. Jones would take the place of Ana Mari Cauce as the 34th president of the University of Washington. He took office in August 2025.

=== Colleges and schools ===
The university has the following colleges and schools:

- College of Arts and Sciences
  - Arts Division
    - School of Art + Art History + Design
    - School of Drama
    - School of Music
  - Humanities Division
  - Natural Sciences Division
  - Social Sciences Division
    - Jackson School of International Studies
- College of Built Environments
- Foster School of Business
- School of Dentistry
- College of Education
- College of Engineering
  - Paul G. Allen School of Computer Science and Engineering
- College of the Environment
  - School of Aquatic and Fishery Sciences
  - School of Environmental and Forest Sciences
  - School of Marine and Environmental Affairs
  - School of Oceanography
- Graduate School
- School of Law
- Information School
- School of Medicine
- School of Nursing
- School of Pharmacy
- Evans School of Public Policy and Governance
- School of Public Health
- School of Social Work

=== Finance ===
In 2017 the university reported $4.893 billion in revenues and $5.666 billion in expenses, resulting in an operating loss of $774 million. This loss was offset by $342 million in state appropriations, $443 million in investment income, $166 million in gifts, and $185 million of other non-operating revenues. Thus, the university's net position increased by $363 million in 2017. According to the 2017 Bondholder Report, endowed gifts are commingled in the university's Consolidated Endowment Fund, managed by an internal investment company at an annual cost of approximately $6.2 million. The university reported $443.383 million of investment income in fiscal year 2017.

The university is funded in part by donations from philanthropists, foundations, and corporations, as well as individual donors. Bill Gates Sr. and his son Bill Gates, as well as Melinda French Gates and the Gates Foundation, are described as having an "unmatched" impact across the entire university. As of 2020, the university's Honor Roll of Donors recognized top contributors as including Bill Gates, Melinda Gates, the Bill & Melinda Gates Foundation, Microsoft, the Robert Wood Johnson Foundation, and the late Paul G. Allen. Additional notable donors include Amazon, AstraZeneca, Bayer, BlackRock, Boeing, Burroughs Wellcome Fund, Carnegie Corporation of New York, Chan Zuckerberg Initiative, China Medical Board, Eli Lilly and Company, Gilead Sciences, GlaxoSmithKline, Merck, Monsanto, Novartis, Open Philanthropy, Open Society Foundations, Pfizer, Rockefeller Foundation, and Wellcome Trust.

=== Social engagement ===
Environmental sustainability has long been a major focus of the university's Board of Regents and Presidents. In February 2006, UW joined a partnership with Seattle City Light as part of their Green Up Program, ensuring that all of Seattle campus' electricity is supplied by and purchased from renewable sources. In 2010, then UW President Emmert furthered the university's efforts with a host of other universities across the United States, and signed the American College & University Presidents' Climate Commitment. UW created a Climate Action Team, as well as an Environmental Stewardship Advisory Committee (ESAC) which keeps track of UW's greenhouse gas emissions and carbon footprint. Policies were enacted with environmental stewardship in mind, and institutional support was provided to assist with campus sustainability. Overall, the University of Washington was one of several universities to receive the highest grade, "A−", on the Sustainable Endowments Institute's College Sustainability Report Card in 2011.

The University of Washington is an active member of the University of the Arctic. UArctic is an international cooperative network based in the Circumpolar Arctic region, consisting of more than 200 universities, colleges, and other organizations with an interest in promoting education and research in the Arctic region. The university also participates in UArctic's mobility program north2north. The aim of that program is to enable students of member institutions to study in different parts of the North.

== Academics ==
The university offers bachelor's, master's and doctoral degrees through its 140 departments, themselves organized into various colleges and schools. It also continues to operate a Transition School and Early Entrance Program on campus, which first began in 1977.

=== Rankings and reputation ===
Academic rankings

National
- Forbes: 44
- U.S. News & World Report: 42 (tie)
- Washington Monthly: 17
- WSJ/College Pulse: 82

Global
- ARWU: 18
- QS: 81
- THE: 25
- U.S. News & World Report: 8

National Program Rankings
Program	Ranking
Audiology	36
Biological Sciences	23
Business	20
Chemistry	24
Clinical Psychology	5
Earth Sciences	10
Economics	35
Education	14
Engineering	24
English	35
Fine Arts	32
Health Care Management	15
History	23
Law	42
Library & Information Studies	2
Mathematics	26
Medical: Primary Care	2
Medical: Research	13
Nursing: Doctorate	1
Nursing: Masters	6
Nursing: Midwifery	8
Occupational Therapy	23
Pharmacy	7
Physical Therapy	25
Physician Assistant	14
Physics	22
Political Science	33
Psychology	26
Public Affairs	6
Public Health	7
Social Work	3
Sociology	17
Speech-Language Pathology	10
Statistics	3

UW is an elected member of the American Association of Universities, and has been listed as a "Public Ivy" in Greene's Guides since 2001.

The Academic Ranking of World Universities (ARWU) has consistently ranked UW as one of the top 20 universities worldwide every year since its first release. In 2019, UW ranked 14th worldwide out of 500 by the ARWU, 26th worldwide out of 981 in the Times Higher Education World University Rankings, and 28th worldwide out of 101 in the Times World Reputation Rankings. Meanwhile, QS World University Rankings ranked it 68th worldwide, out of over 900.

U.S. News & World Report ranked UW 6th out of nearly 1,500 universities worldwide for 2024, with UW's undergraduate program tied for 40th among 389 national universities in the U.S. and tied for 19th among 209 public universities.

In 2019, it ranked 10th among the universities around the world by SCImago Institutions Rankings.

In 2019, Kiplinger magazine's review of "top college values" named UW 5th for in-state students and 10th for out-of-state students among U.S. public colleges, and 84th overall out of 500 schools. In the Washington Monthly National University Rankings UW was ranked 15th domestically in 2018, based on its contribution to the public good as measured by social mobility, research, and promoting public service.

In 2017, the Leiden Ranking, which focuses on science and the impact of scientific publications among the world's 500 major universities, ranked UW 12th globally and 5th in the U.S.

=== Undergraduate admissions ===
Undergraduate admissions statistics
- 2024 entering class
- Admit rate: 39.5% (▼ −6.2)
- Yield rate: 26.4% (▼ −6.2)

Test scores middle 50%^{[i]}
- SAT Total: 1280–1490 (among 14% of FTFs)
- ACT Composite: 30–34 (among 5% of FTFs)

High school GPA
- Average: 3.82

The university does not require submission of either SAT or ACT scores for admission, and the university position is that those scores are "not considered for admission, even if submitted (test blind)". In 2024, newly enrolled students had a median high school GPA of 3.82. The university's undergraduate admissions process is rated 91/99 by the Princeton Review, and is classified "more selective" by the U.S. News & World Report. For the Class of 2025 (enrolled fall 2021), UW received 48,840 applications and accepted 26,121 (53.5%). Of those accepted, 7,252 enrolled, a yield rate (the percentage of accepted students who choose to attend the university) of 27.8%. UW's freshman retention rate is 93%, with 84% going on to graduate within six years.

Of the 19% of the incoming freshman class who submitted SAT scores; the middle 50 percent Composite scores were 1240–1450. Of the 8% of enrolled freshmen in 2021 who submitted ACT scores; the middle 50 percent Composite score was between 29 and 34. In the 2020–2021 academic year, 24 freshman students were National Merit Scholars.

The university uses capacity constrained majors, a gate-keeping process that requires most students to apply to an internal college or faculty. New applications are usually considered once or twice annually, and few students are admitted each time. The screening process is based on cumulative academic performance, recommendation letters and extracurricular activities.

Fall first-time freshman statistics
	2023	2022	2021	2020	2019	2018	2017
Applicants	62,428	52,488	48,840	43,778	45,579	45,907	44,877
Admits	26,552	24,942	26,121	24,467	23,592	22,350	20,833
Admit rate	39.5	42.5	47.5	53.5	55.9	51.8	48.7
Enrolled	7,006	7,415	7,252	7,027	6,992	7,167	6,793
Yield rate	26.4	29.7	27.8	28.7	29.6	32.1	32.6
ACT composite* (out of 36)	30–34 (5%^{†})	29–34 (7%^{†})	29–34 (8%^{†})	27–33 (28%^{†})	27–33 (30%^{†})	27–32 (31%^{†})	27–32 (40%^{†})
SAT composite* (out of 1600)	1280–1490 (14%^{†})	1320–1500 (17%^{†})	1240–1450 (19%^{†})<	1220–1430 (81%^{†})	1240–1440 (81%^{†})	1220–1460 (80%^{†})	1190–1420 (75%^{†})
* middle 50% range^{†} percentage of first-time freshmen who chose to submit

=== Research ===
UW's research budget surpassed the $1.0 billion research budget milestone in 2012, and university endowments reached almost $5.0 billion by 2021.

In 2014, the University of Washington School of Oceanography and the UW Applied Physics Laboratory completed the construction of the first high-power underwater cabled observatory in the United States. Gabrielle Rocap, one of the researchers who discovered arsenic-breathing microbes in the Pacific, is part of the department's faculty.

To promote equal academic opportunity, especially for people of low income, UW launched Husky Promise in 2006. Families of income up to 65 percent of state median income or 235 percent of the federal poverty level are eligible. With this, up to 30 percent of undergraduate students may be eligible. The cut-off income level that UW set is the highest in the nation, making top-quality education available to more people. UW President Mark Emmert said that being "elitist is not in our DNA".

UW was the host university of ResearchChannel program (now defunct), the only TV channel in the United States dedicated solely for the dissemination of research from academic institutions and research organizations. Participation of ResearchChannel included 36 universities, 15 research organizations, two corporate research centers and many other affiliates.

Alan Michelson, now Head of the Built Environments Library at UW Seattle, manages the Pacific Coast Architecture Database (PCAD), which Michelson started in 2002 while he worked as Architecture and Design Librarian at the University of California, Los Angeles (UCLA). The PCAD serves as a searchable public database detailing significant but importantly, also lesser-known and -lauded designers, buildings and structures, and partnerships, with links including to bibliographic literature.

In 2019, iDefense reported that Chinese hackers had launched cyberattacks on dozens of academic institutions in an attempt to gain information on technology being developed for the United States Navy. Some of the targets included the University of Washington. The attacks have been underway since at least April 2017.

== Student life ==
Undergraduate demographics as of Fall 2024
Race and ethnicity	Total
White	33%
Asian	23%
International student	13%
Hispanic	10%
Two or more races	8%
Unknown	7%
Black	5%
Economic diversity
Low-income (Note: The percentage of students who received an income-based federal Pell grant intended for low-income students.)	22%
Affluent (Note: The percentage of students who are a part of the American middle class at the bare minimum.)	78%

The University of Washington had 50,097 total enrollments as of fall 2023, making it the largest university on the West Coast by student population in spite of its selective admissions process. It also boasts one of the most diverse student bodies within the US, with more than 50% of its undergraduate students self-identifying with minority groups.

=== Student groups ===
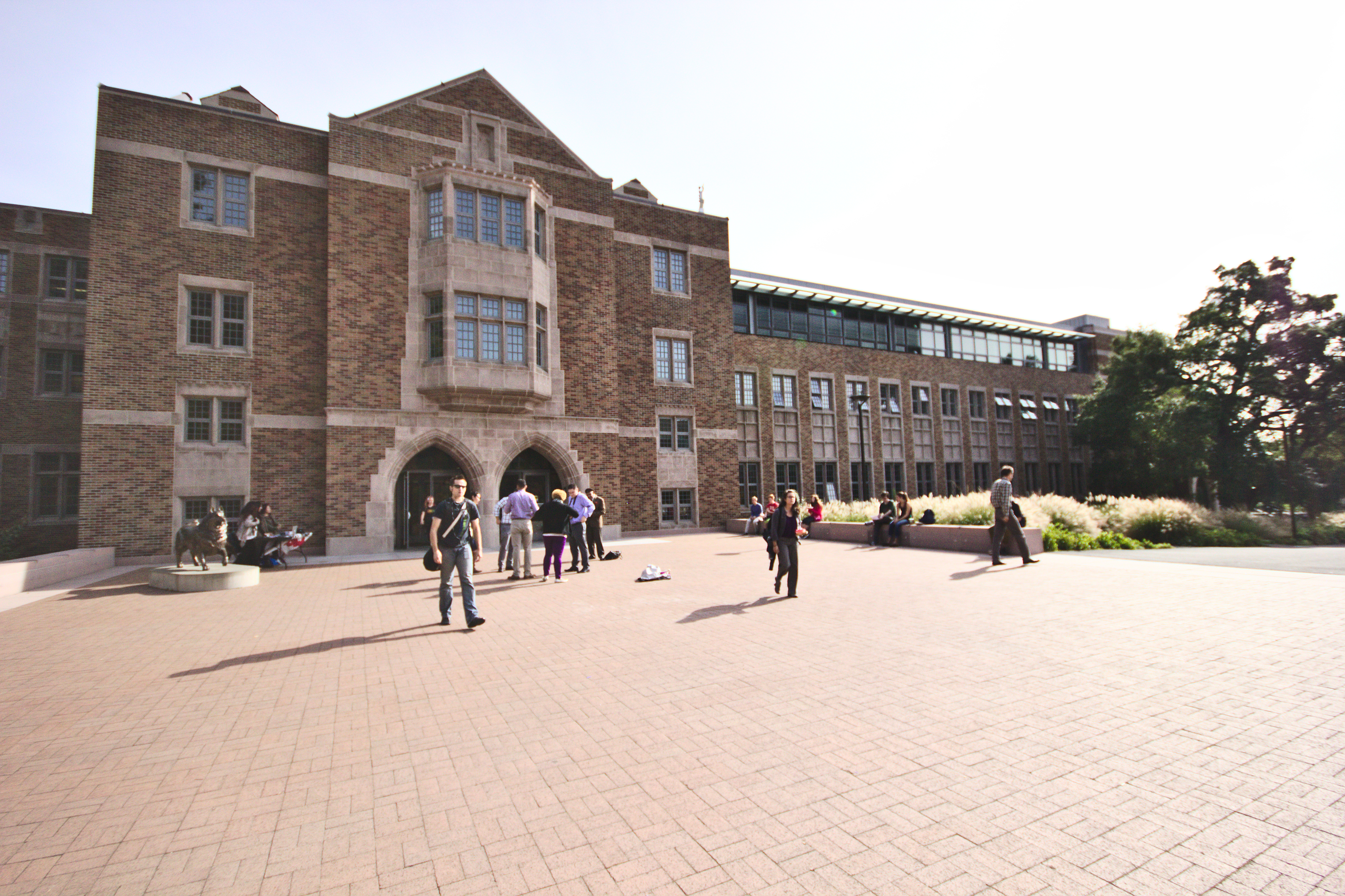
The Husky Union Building, one of many facilities for student resources

==== Registered groups ====
The University of Washington boasts over 800 active Registered Student Organizations (RSOs), one of the largest networks of any universities in the world. RSOs are dedicated to a wide variety of interests both in and beyond campus. Some of these interest areas include academic focus groups, cultural exchanges, environmental activities, Greek life, political/social action, religious discussions, sports, international student gatherings by country, and STEM-specific events.

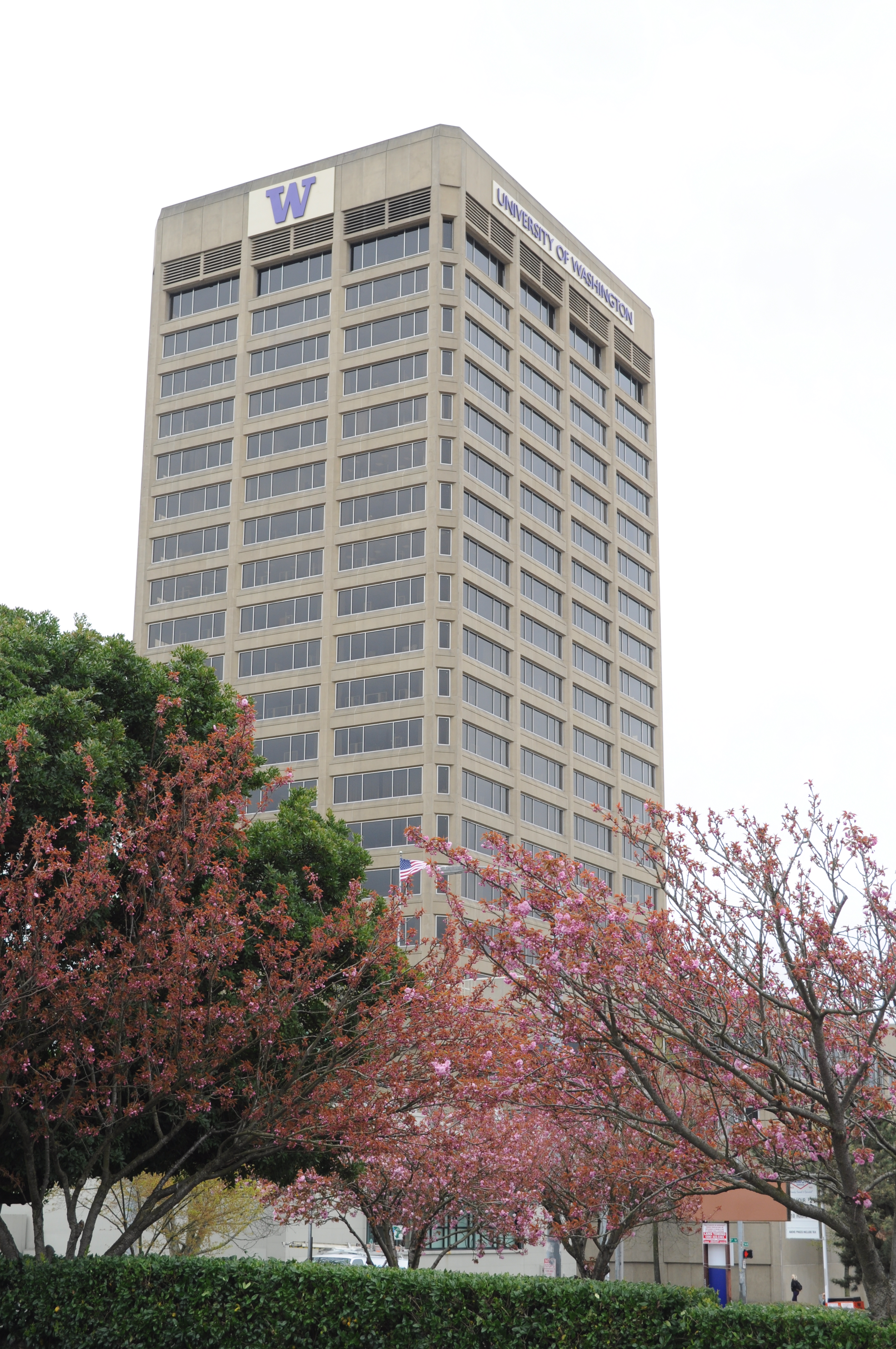
UW Tower, a conference space and administrative building

==== Student government ====
The Associated Students of the University of Washington (ASUW) is one of two student governments at the University of Washington, the other being the Graduate and Professional Student Senate. It is funded and supported by student fees, and provides services that directly and indirectly benefit them. The ASUW employs over 72 current University of Washington students, has over 500 volunteers, and spends $1.03 million annually to provide services and activities to the student body of 43,000 on-campus. The Student Senate was established in 1994 as a division of the Associated Students of the University of Washington. Student Senate is one of two official student-governed bodies and provides a broad-based discussion of issues. Currently, the ASUW Student Senate has a legislative body of over 150 senators representing a diverse set of interests on and off-campus.

The ASUW was incorporated in the State of Washington in 1906. The ASUW Experimental College, part of the ASUW, was created in 1968 by several University of Washington students seeking to provide the campus and surrounding community with a selection of non-credit classes not offered on the university curriculum. The Experimental College ceased operation in 2017.

=== Publication ===
The student newspaper is The Daily of the University of Washington. It is the second-largest daily paper in Seattle. In 2010, The Daily launched a half-hour weekly television magazine show, The Daily's Double Shot, on UWTV Channel 27. UW continues to use its proprietary UWTV channel, online and printed publications. The faculty also produce their own publications for students and alumni.

The Tyee was the official student yearbook of the University of Washington.

=== Student activism ===
Throughout the 20th century, UW student activism centered around a variety of national and international concerns, from nuclear energy to the Vietnam War and civil rights. In 1948, at the beginning of the McCarthyism era, students brought their activism to bear on campus by protesting the firing of three UW professors accused of communist affiliations.

==== 2025 IEB sit-in ====
On May 5, 2025, while participating in a pro-Palestinian sit-in protest in UW's recently constructed Interdisciplinary Engineering Building (IEB), 33 students were arrested. The students were protesting against the University's ties to Boeing, which has continued to sell military-grade weaponry to Israel amid the ongoing war in Gaza. The company had invested $10 million in the construction of the IEB in 2022. The protesters, numbering about 75 students, hung a banner which declared the new name of the building as the "Sha'aban al-Dalou Building", in honor of a 19-year-old Palestinian software engineering student who was killed in 2024 by an Israeli bombing. They occupied the building for several hours and barricaded the doors until they were forcibly removed by riot police. The University had called in the Seattle Police Department and the Washington State Patrol to remove them. According to one of the leaders of the protest group, "[the police] gave a one-hour dispersal warning to those inside, then entered within 10 minutes, were immediately violent — grabbing people, throwing people downstairs, slamming people into the ground", and several students reported injuries. A UW spokesperson "said that he was not aware of any protester injuries". According to UW, the protest resulted in $900,051 in damages to the IEB.

A few days later, the University announced emergency suspensions for the students who had been arrested. After an eight-month long investigative process, the students involved in the protest were acquitted of the majority of charges by UW's disciplinary process. All of the students were found responsible for "failure to comply with law enforcement and for entering the building without authorization", and one student for "Disruption or Obstruction". All were found not responsible for charges of "Abuse of Others," "Aiding, Assisting and Attempting," and "Vandalism". Their suspensions were lifted, and no further sanctions were imposed upon them by the university. Some still face criminal charges.

=== University support ===
==== Housing ====
The university operates one of the largest campuses of any higher education institution in the world. Despite this, growing faculty and student count has strained the regional housing supply as well as transportation facilities. Starting in 2012, UW began taking active measures to explore, plan and enact a series of campus policies to manage the annual growth. In addition to new buildings, parking and light rail stations, new building construction and renovations have been scheduled to take place through 2020. The plan includes the construction of three six-story residence halls and two apartment complexes in the west section of campus, near the existing Terry and Lander Halls, in Phase I, the renovation of six existing residence halls in Phase II, and additional new construction in Phase III. The projects will result in a net gain of approximately 2,400 beds. The Residence Hall Student Association (student government for the halls) is the second-largest student organization on campus and helps plan fun events in the halls. For students, faculty, and staff looking to live off-campus, they may also explore Off-Campus Housing Affairs.

The Greek system at UW has also been a prominent part of student culture for more than 115 years. It is made up of two organizational bodies, the Interfraternity Council (IFC) and the Panhellenic Association. The IFC looks over 34 fraternities with 1,900+ members, and Panhellenic consists of 19 sororities and 1,900 members. The school has additional Greek organizations that do not offer housing and are primarily special-interest.

==== Disability resources ====
In addition to the University of Washington's Disability Resources for Students (DRS) office, there is also a campus-wide DO-IT (Disabilities, Opportunities, Internetworking, and Technology) Center program that assists educational institutions to fully integrate all students, including those with disabilities, into academic life. DO-IT includes a variety of initiatives, such as the DO-IT Scholars Program, and provides information on the "universal" design of educational facilities for students of all levels of physical and mental ability. These design programs aim to reduce systemic barriers which could otherwise hinder the performance of some students, and may also be applied to other professional organizations and conferences.

== Athletics ==
UW students, sports teams, and alumni are called Washington Huskies. The husky was selected as the school mascot by the student committee in 1922, which replaced the "Sun Dodger", an abstract reference to the local weather.

The university participates in the National Collegiate Athletic Association's Division I FBS. It is a member of the Big Ten Conference, after having been in the Pac-12 Conference for decades prior until the 2024 conference realignment. The football team is traditionally competitive, having won the 1960 and 1991 national title and appeared in the College Football Playoff in 2016 and 2023, to go along with seven Rose Bowl victories and single wins in the Orange Bowl and Sugar Bowl. From 1907 to 1917, Washington football teams were unbeaten in 64 consecutive games, an NCAA record. Tailgating by boat has been a Husky Stadium tradition since 1920 when the stadium was first built on the shores of Lake Washington. The Apple Cup game is an annual game against cross-state rival Washington State University that was first contested in 1900 with UW leading the all-time series, 75 wins to 33 losses and 6 ties. Following the 2024 conference realignment—which resulted with UW and WSU in separate conferences—the schools agreed to continue the Apple Cup "through at least 2028." This game was last won by the University of Washington, and the Apple Cup trophy currently resides in Seattle. College Football Hall of Fame member Don James is a former head coach.

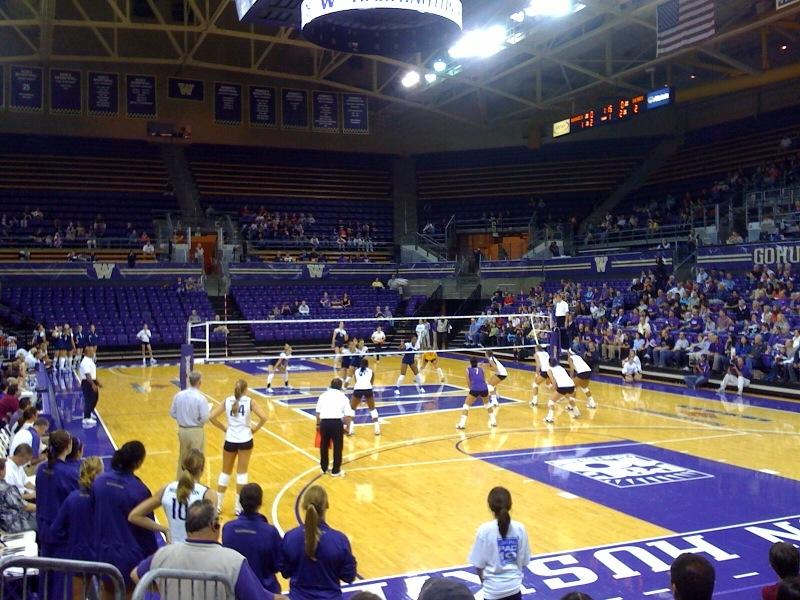
The Hec Edmundson Pavilion hosts basketball and volleyball events

The men's basketball team has been moderately successful, though recently the team has enjoyed a resurgence under coach Lorenzo Romar. With Romar as head coach, the team has been to six NCAA tournaments (2003–2004, 2004–2005, 2005–2006, 2008–2009, 2009–2010 and 2010–2011 seasons), 2 consecutive top 16 (sweet sixteen) appearances, and secured a No. 1 seed in 2005. On December 23, 2005, the men's basketball team won their 800th victory in Hec Edmundson Pavilion, the most wins for any NCAA team in its current arena.

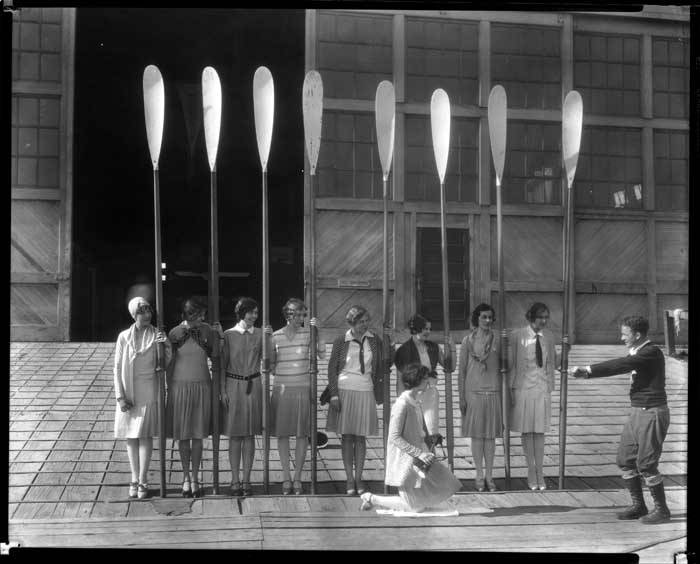
Women's crew at the University of Washington (1929)

Rowing is a longstanding tradition at the University of Washington dating back to 1901. The Washington men's crew gained international prominence by winning the gold medal at the 1936 Summer Olympics in Berlin, defeating the German and Italian crews much to the dismay of Adolf Hitler who was in attendance. The team was depicted in the 2013 bestseller The Boys in the Boat. In 1958, the men's crew deepened their legend with a shocking win over Leningrad Trud's world champion rowers at the Moscow Cup, resulting in the first American sporting victory on Soviet soil, and certainly the first time a Russian crowd gave any American team a standing ovation during the Cold War. The men's crew have won 46 national titles (15 Intercollegiate Rowing Association, 1 National Collegiate Rowing Championship), 15 Olympic gold medals, two silver and five bronze. The women have 10 national titles and two Olympic gold medals. In 1997, the women's team won the NCAA championship. The Husky men are the 2015 national champions.

Recent national champions include the softball team (2009), the men's rowing team (2015, 2014, 2013, 2012, 2011, 2009, 2007), NCAA Division I women's cross country team (2008), and the women's volleyball team (2005). Individually, Scott Roth was the 2011 NCAA men's Outdoor Pole Vault and 2011 & 2010 NCAA men's Indoor Pole Vault champion. James Lepp was the 2005 NCAA men's golf champion. Ryan Brown (men's 800 meters) and Amy Lia (women's 1500 meters) won individual titles at the 2006 NCAA Track and Field Championships. Brad Walker was the 2005 NCAA men's Outdoor and Indoor Pole Vault champion.

The university has an extensive series of sports facilities, including but not limited to the Husky Stadium (football, track and field), the Alaska Airlines Arena at Hec Edmundson Pavilion (basketball, volleyball, and gymnastics), Husky Ballpark (baseball), Husky Softball Stadium, The Bill Quillian Tennis Stadium, The Nordstrom Tennis Center, Dempsey Indoor (Indoor track and field, football) and the Conibear Shellhouse (rowing). The golf team plays at the Washington National Golf Club and until recently, the swimming team called the Weyerhaeuser Aquatic Center and the Husky pool home. The university discontinued its men's and women's swim teams on May 1, 2009, due to budget cuts.

=== Husky Stadium ===
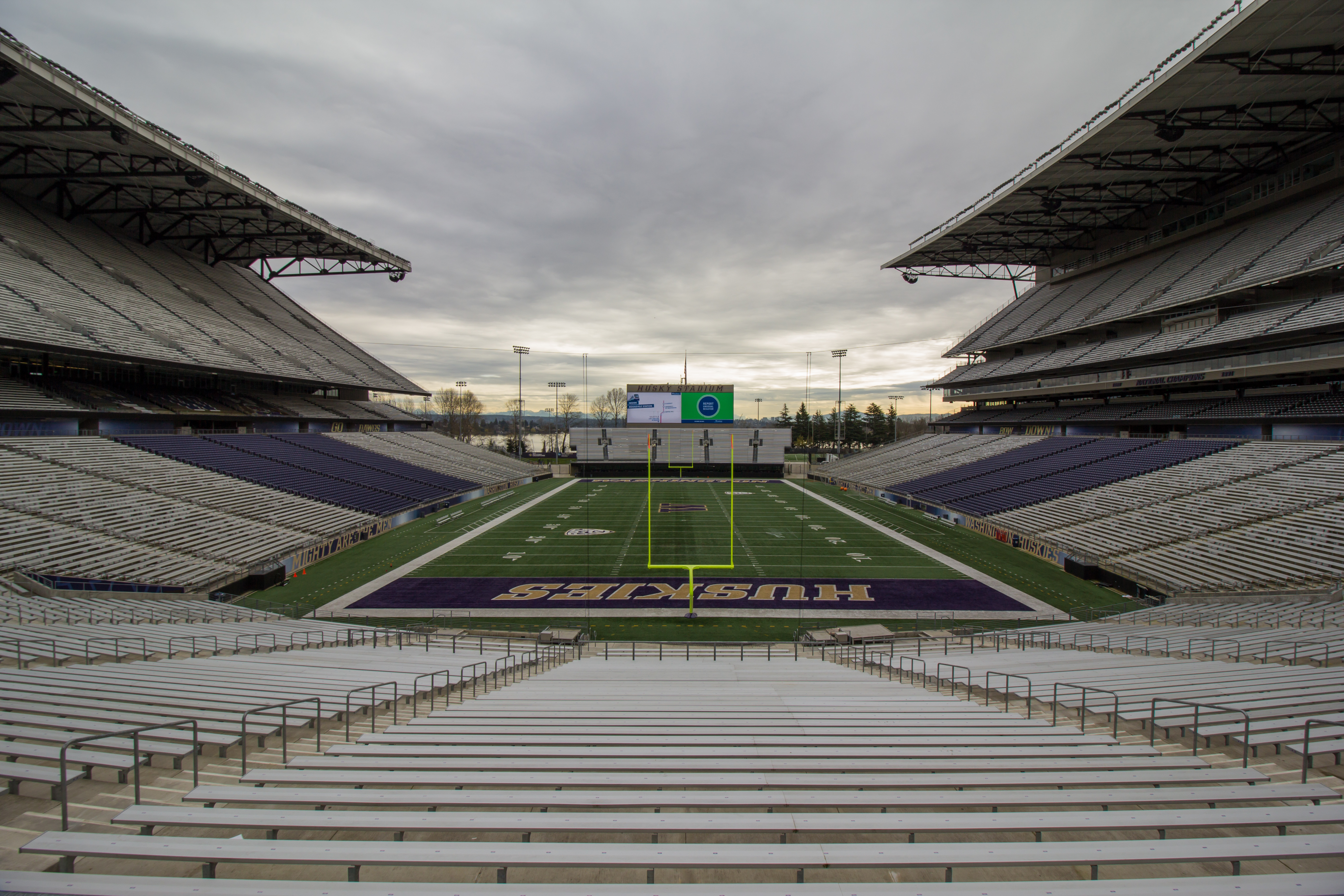
The rebuilt Husky Stadium, in 2016

The rebuilt Husky Stadium is the first and primary source of income for the completely remodeled athletic district. The major remodel consisted of a new grand concourse, underground light-rail station which opened on March 19, 2016, an enclosed west end design, replacement of bleachers with individual seating, removal of track and Huskytron, as well as the installation of a new press box section, private box seating, football offices, permanent seating in the east end zone that does not block the view of Lake Washington. The project also included new and improved amenities, concession stands, and bathrooms throughout. The cost for renovating the stadium was around $280 million and was designed for a slightly lower seating capacity than its previous design, now at 70,138 seats. The university calls the stadium the "Greatest Setting in College Football."

=== Mascot ===
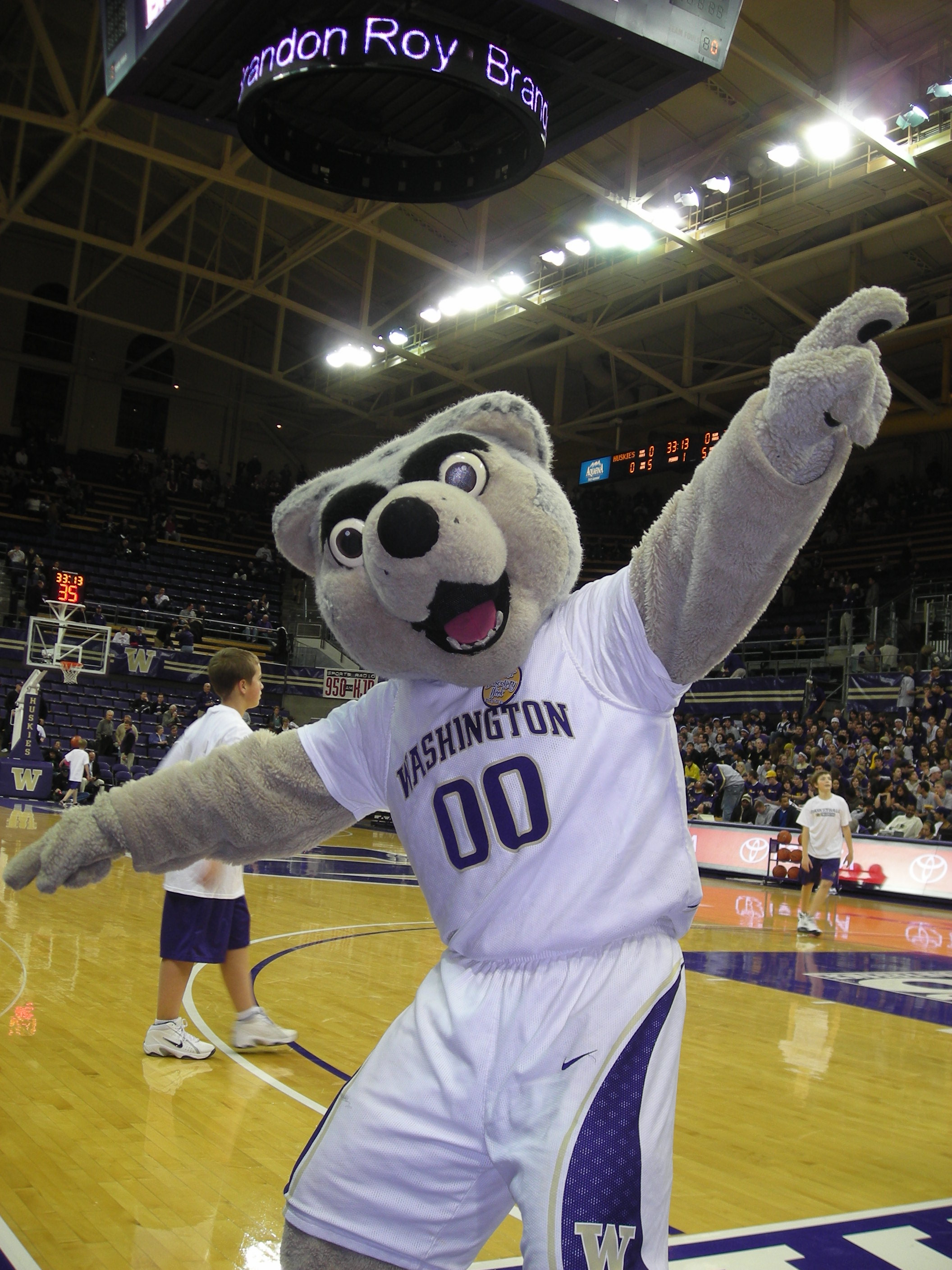
The costumed mascot, Harry the Husky, at a basketball game

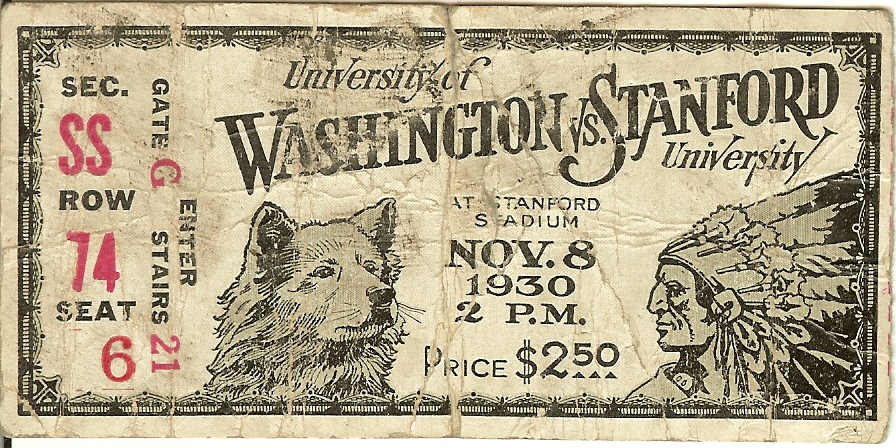
1930 football ticket stub depicting the UW Husky mascot

The University of Washington's costumed mascot is Harry the Husky. "Harry the Husky" performs at sporting and special events, and a live Alaskan Malamute, currently named Dubs II, has traditionally led the UW football team onto the field at the start of games. The school colors of purple and gold were adopted in 1892 by student vote. The choice was inspired by the first stanza of Lord Byron's The Destruction of Sennacherib:

The Assyrian came down like the wolf on the fold,
And his cohorts were gleaming in purple and gold;
And the sheen of their spears was like stars on the sea,
When the blue wave rolls nightly on deep Galilee.

The university has also hosted a long line of Alaskan Malamutes as mascots.

== Notable alumni and faculty ==
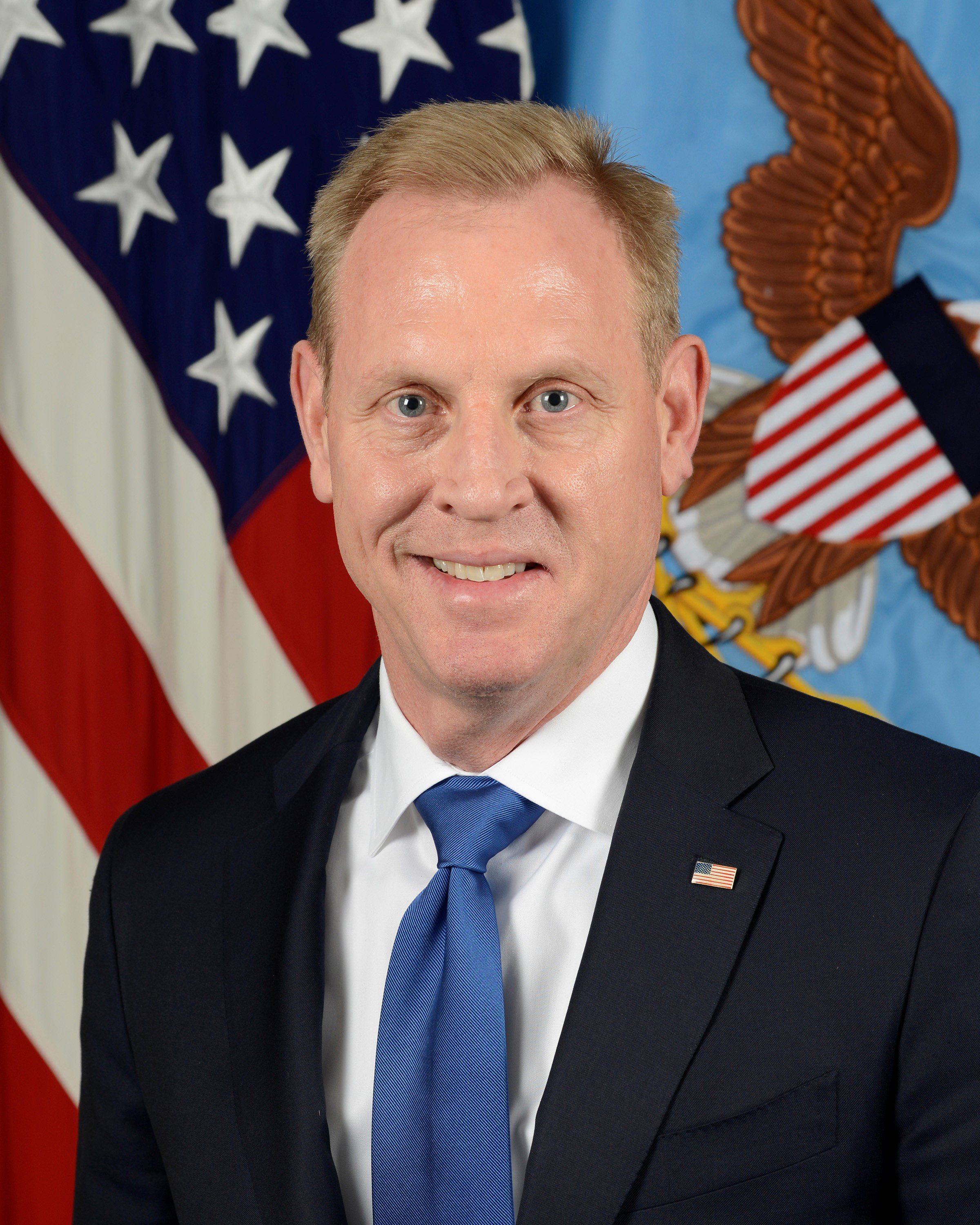
Patrick M. Shanahan, United States secretary of defense

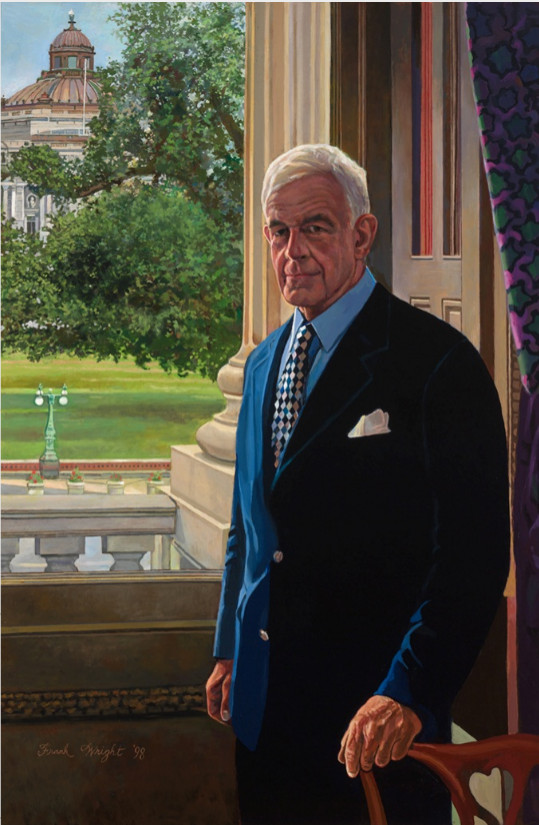
Tom Foley, 49th speaker of the United States House of Representatives

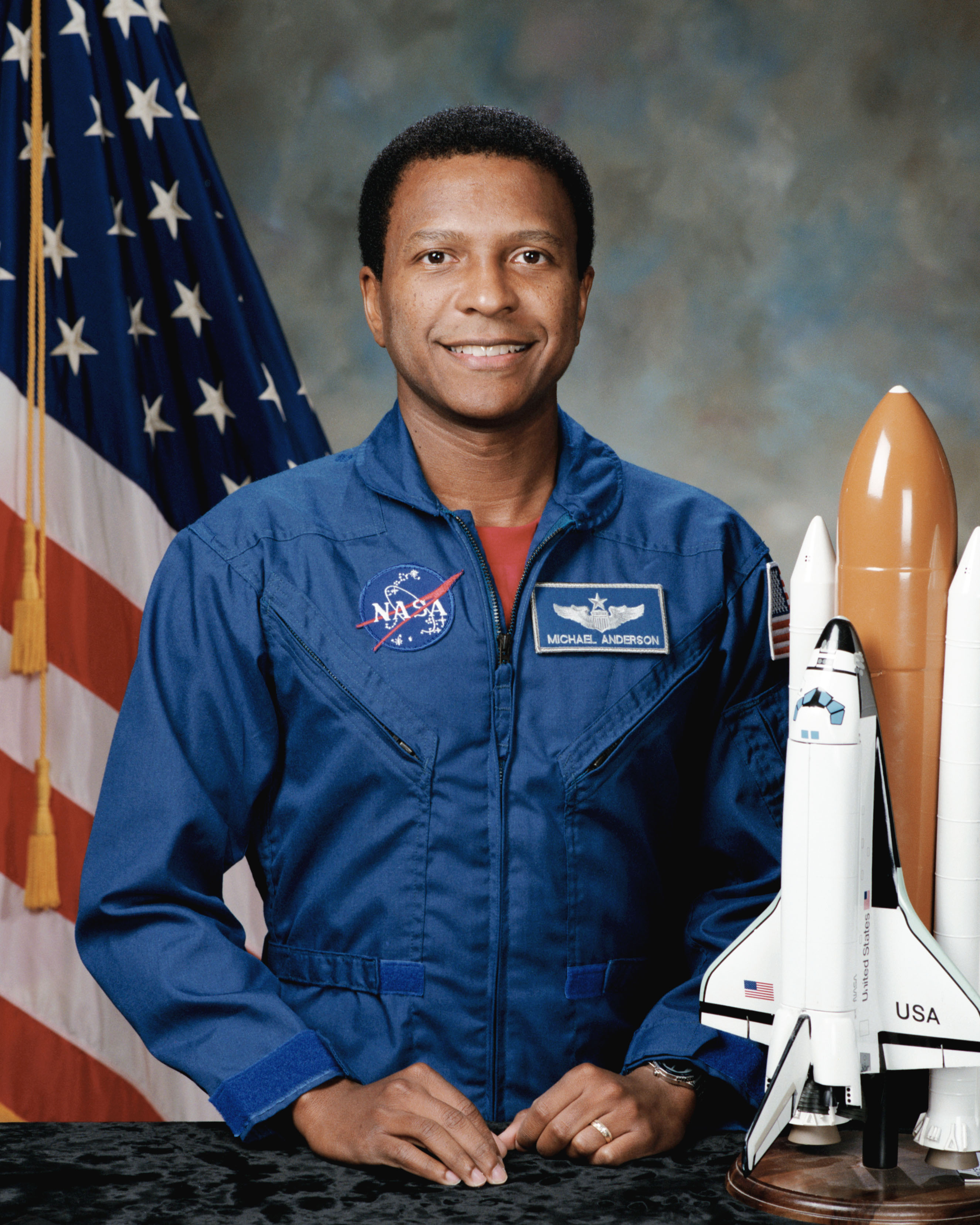
Michael P. Anderson, NASA astronaut and Space Shuttle Columbia disaster crew member

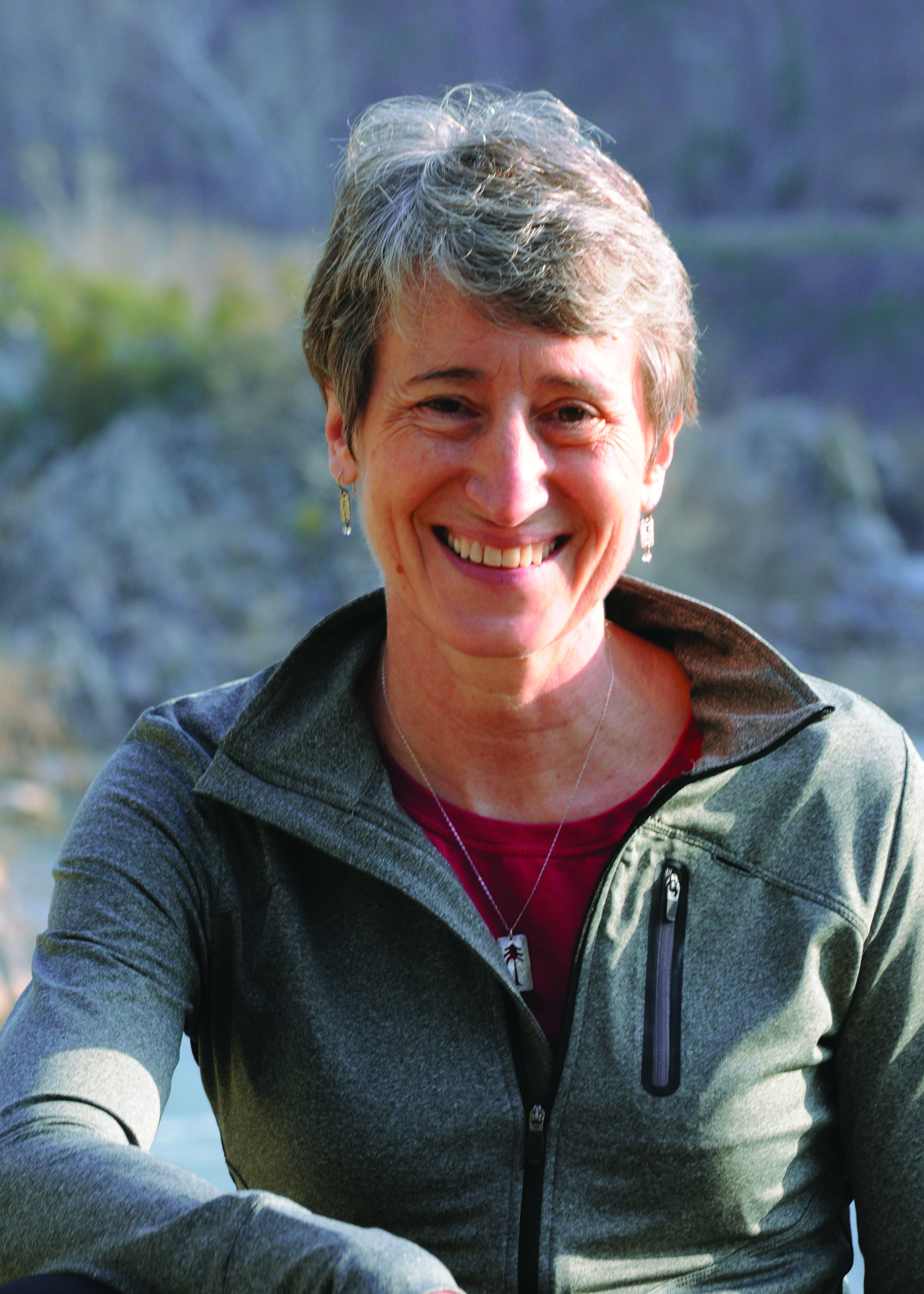
Sally Jewell, 51st United States secretary of the interior and former CEO of REI

Norm Rice, first elected African-American mayor of Seattle

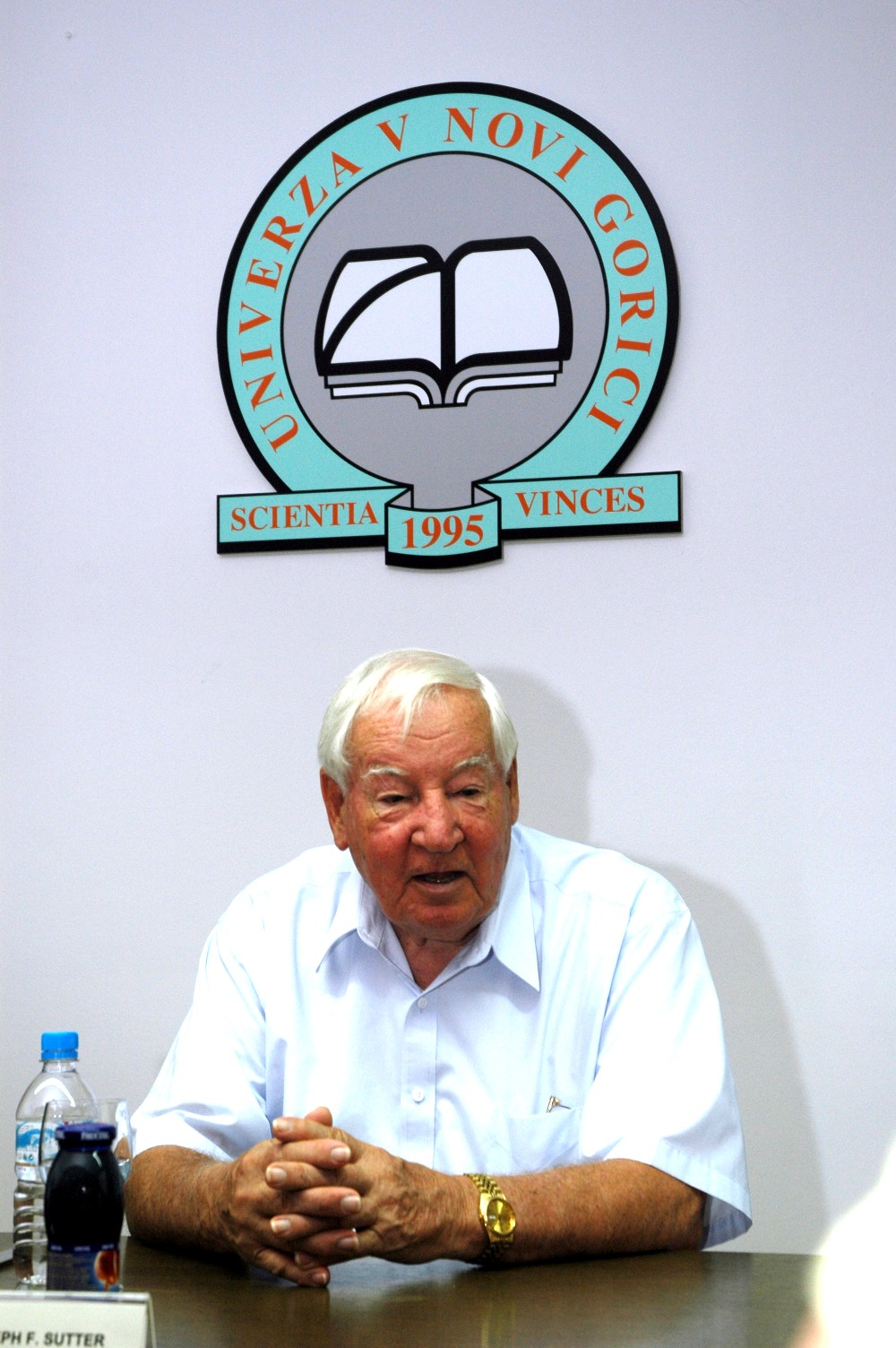
Joe Sutter, head of the Boeing 747 design team

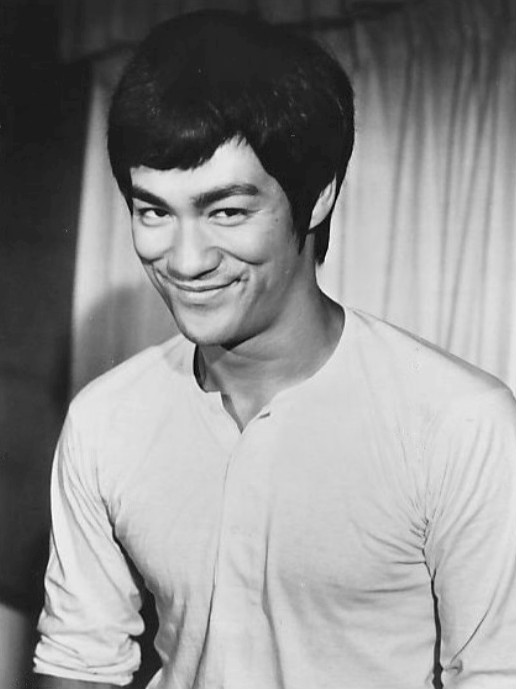
Bruce Lee, actor and martial artist

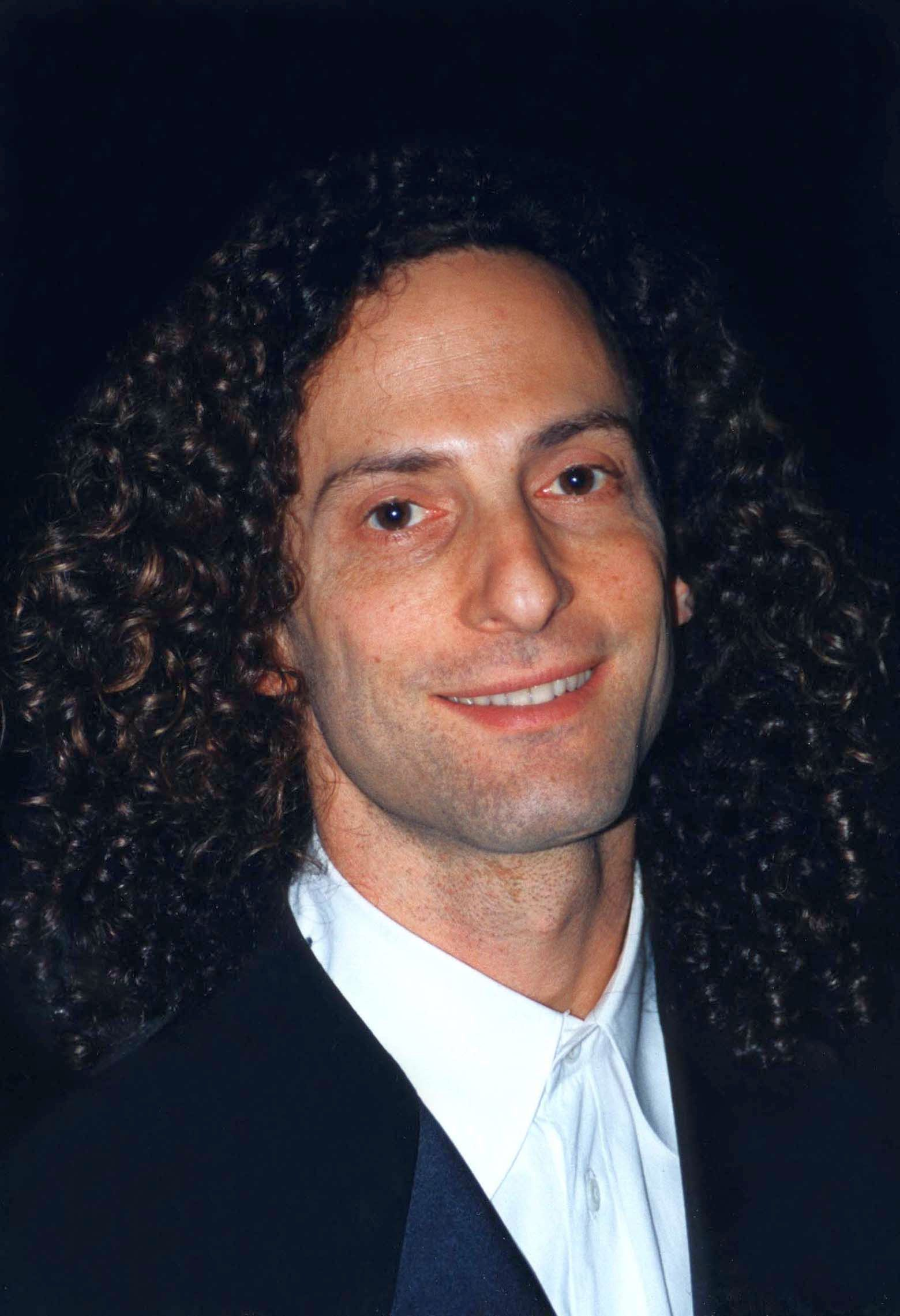
Kenny G, Grammy Award-winning jazz musician

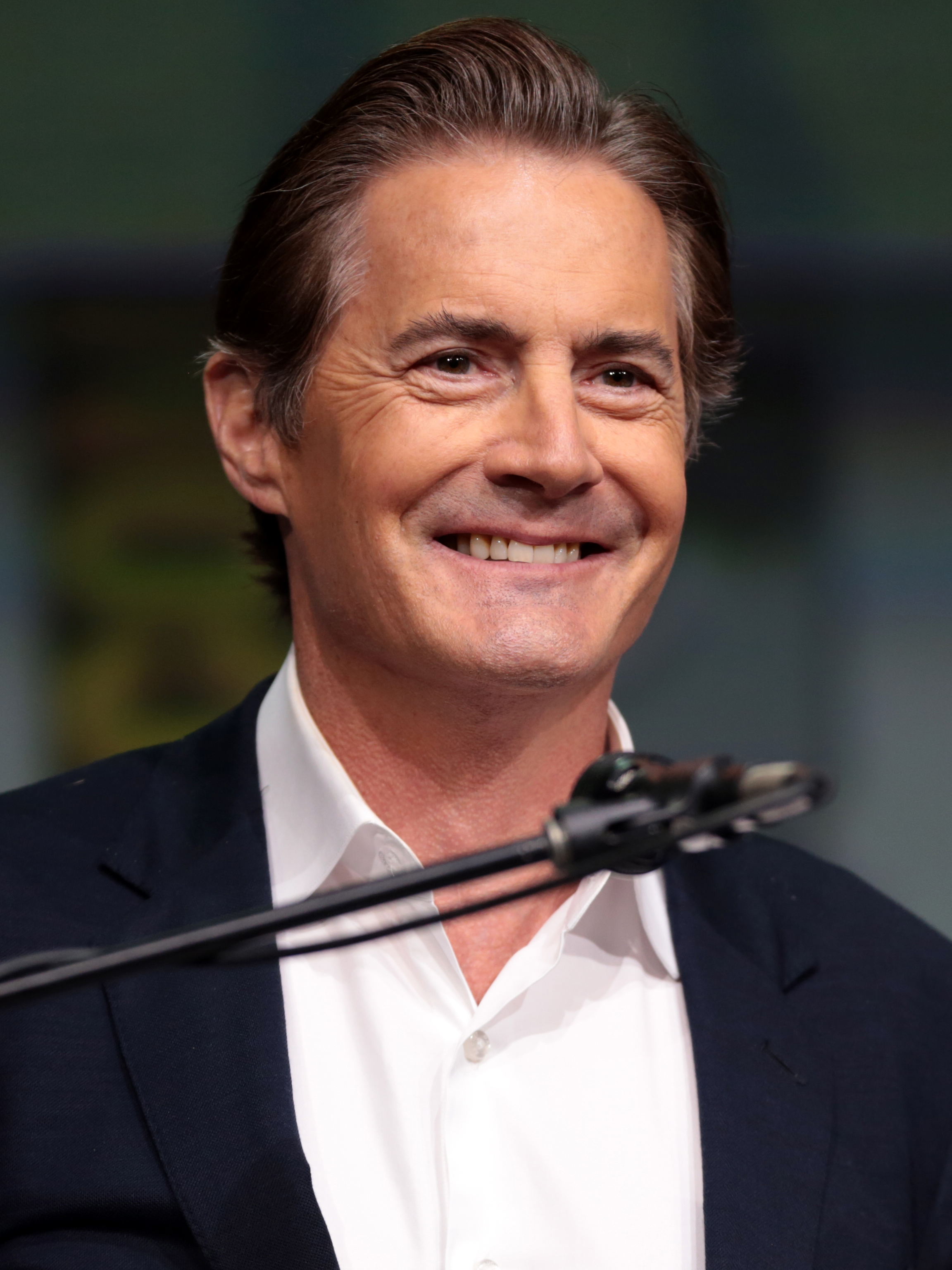
Kyle MacLachlan, Golden Globe Award-winning actor

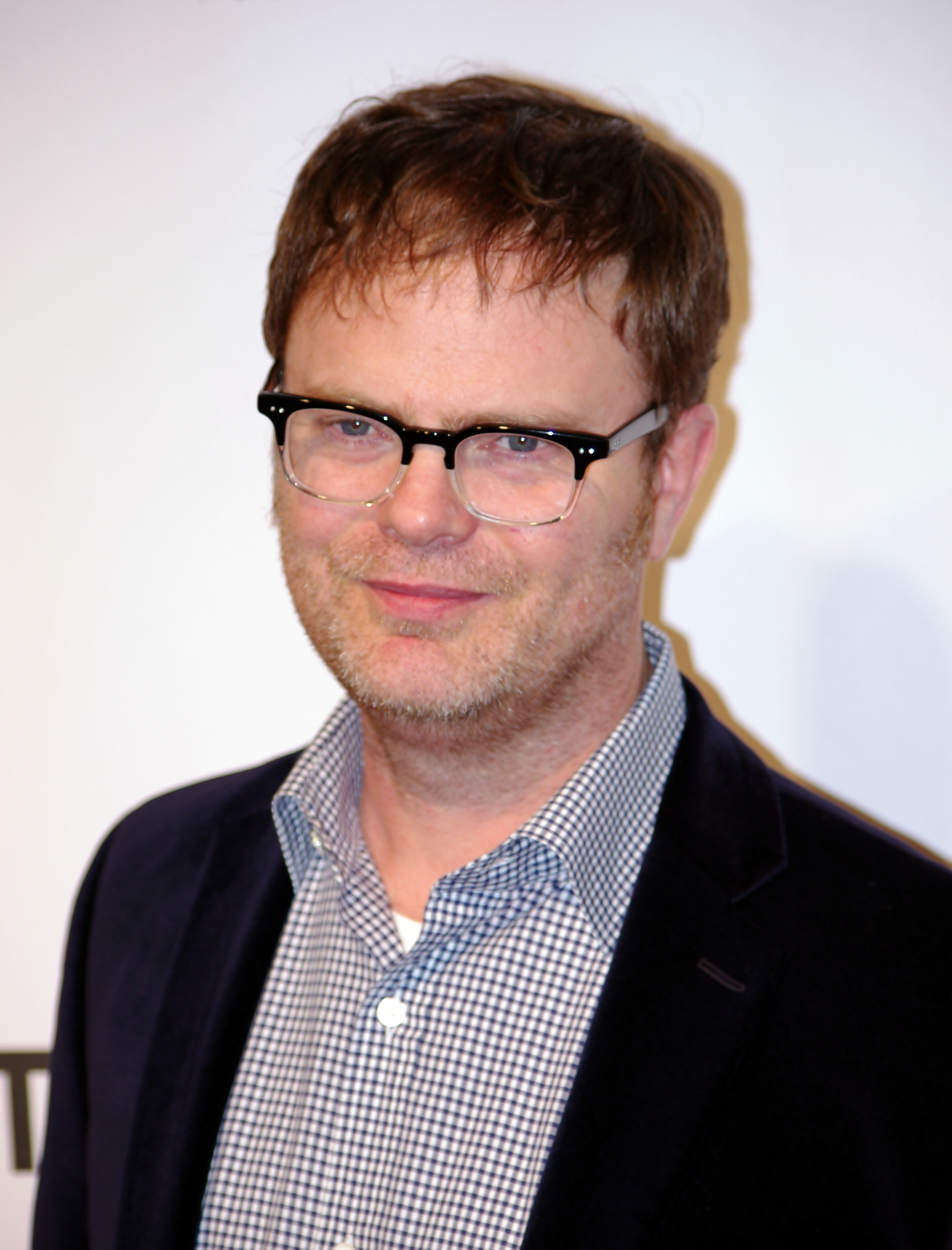
Rainn Wilson, actor

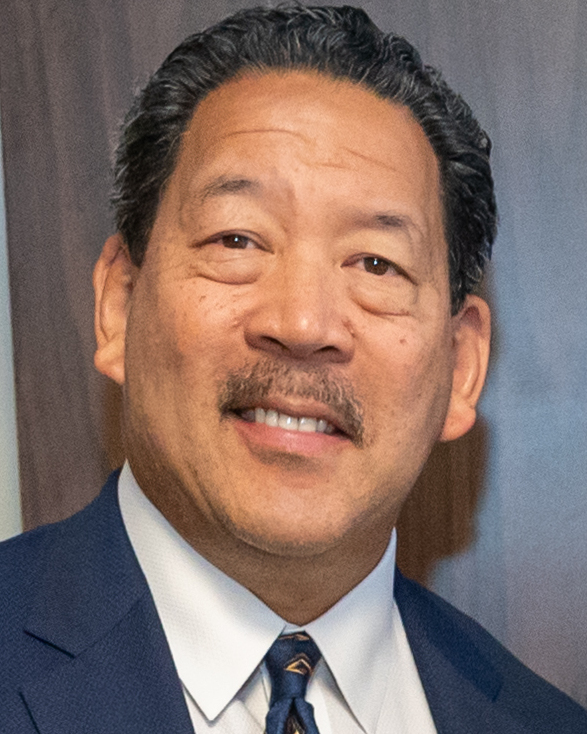
Bruce Harrell, 54th and 57th mayor of Seattle

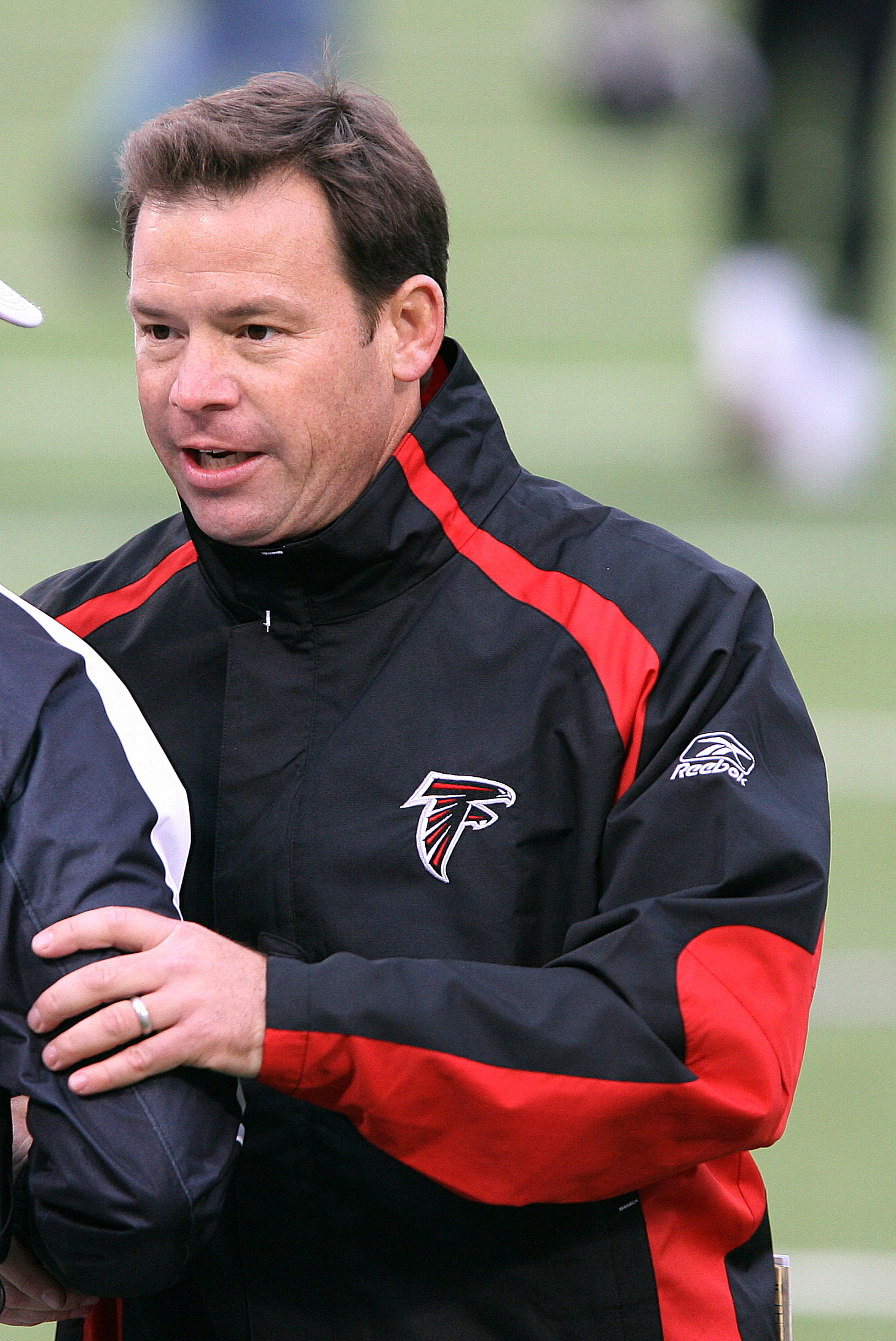
Jim L. Mora, former NFL coach

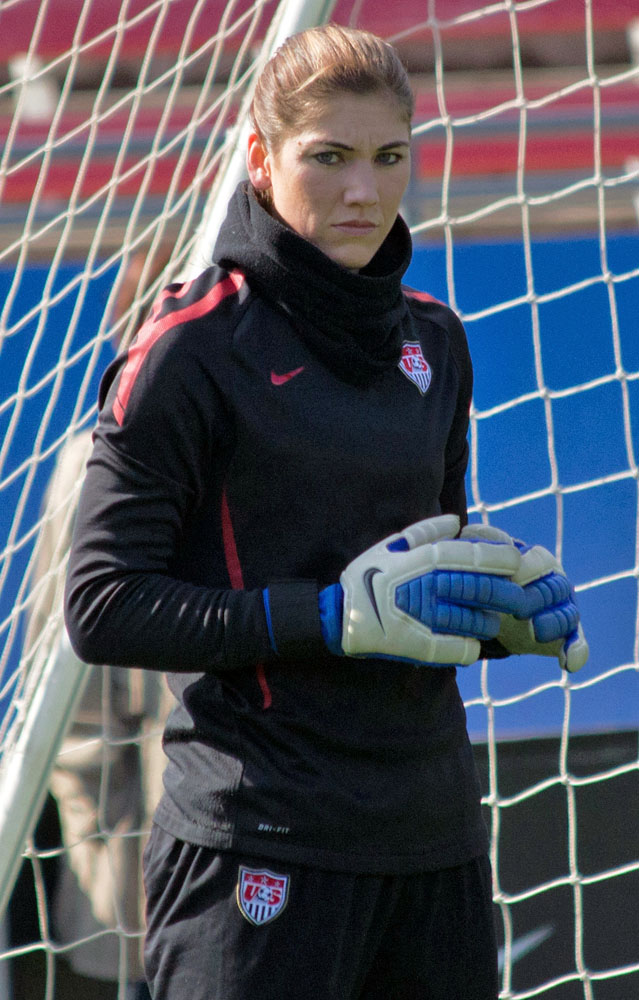
Hope Solo, former USWNT goalkeeper

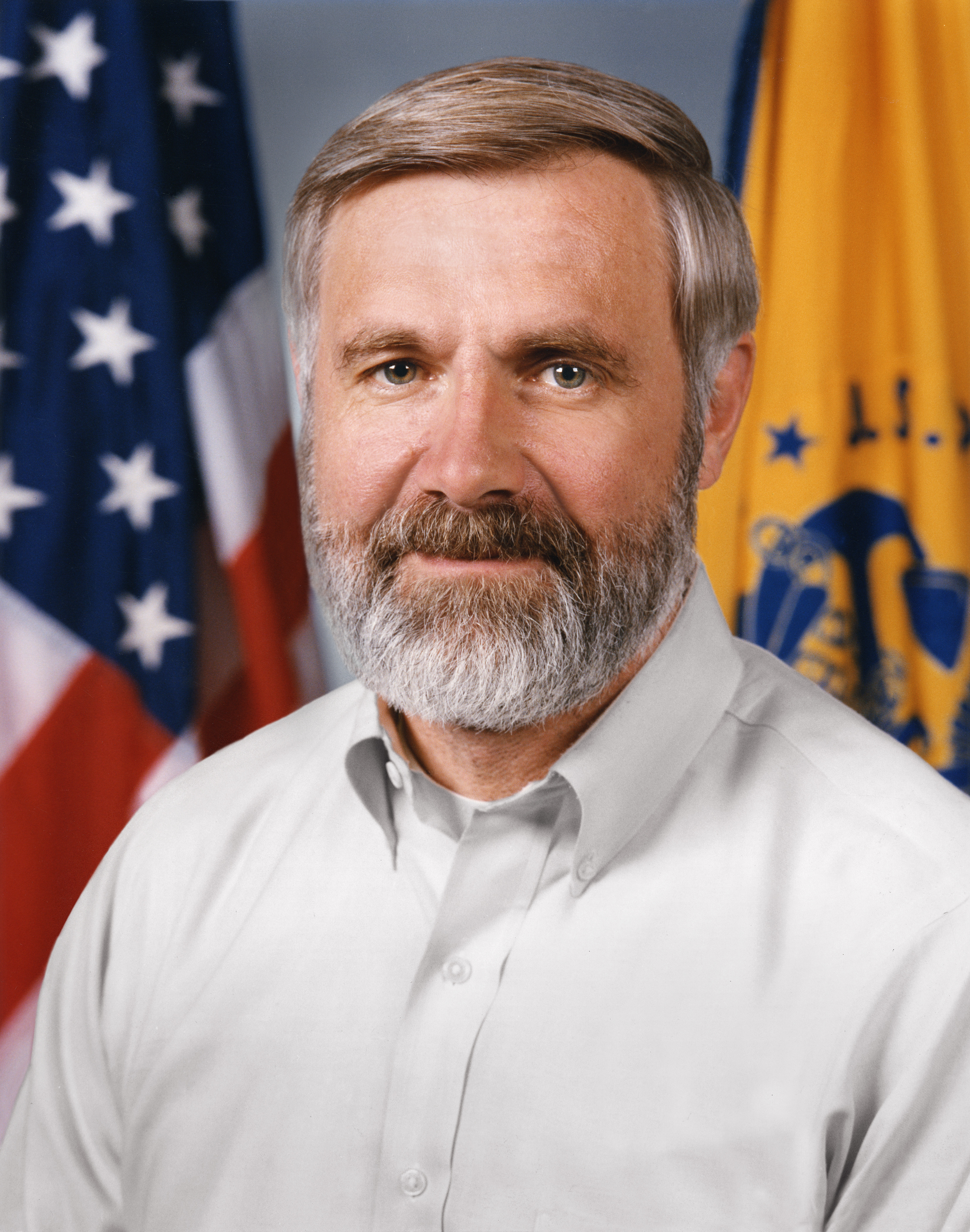
William Foege, former director of the CDC, credited for global smallpox eradication strategy

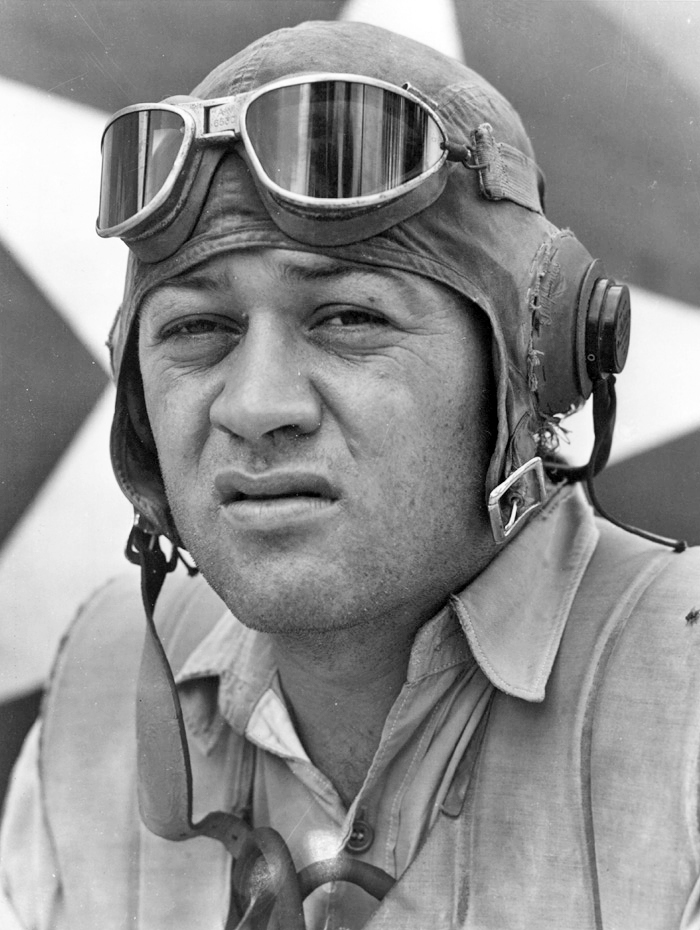
Pappy Boyington, World War II combat fighter ace

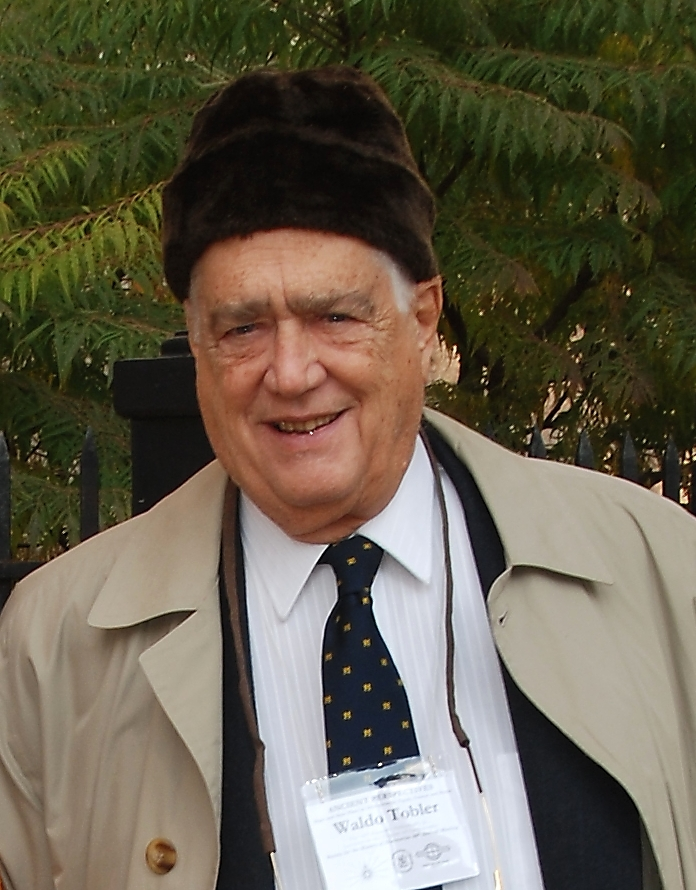
Waldo R. Tobler, geographer and cartographer known for his first and second law of geography

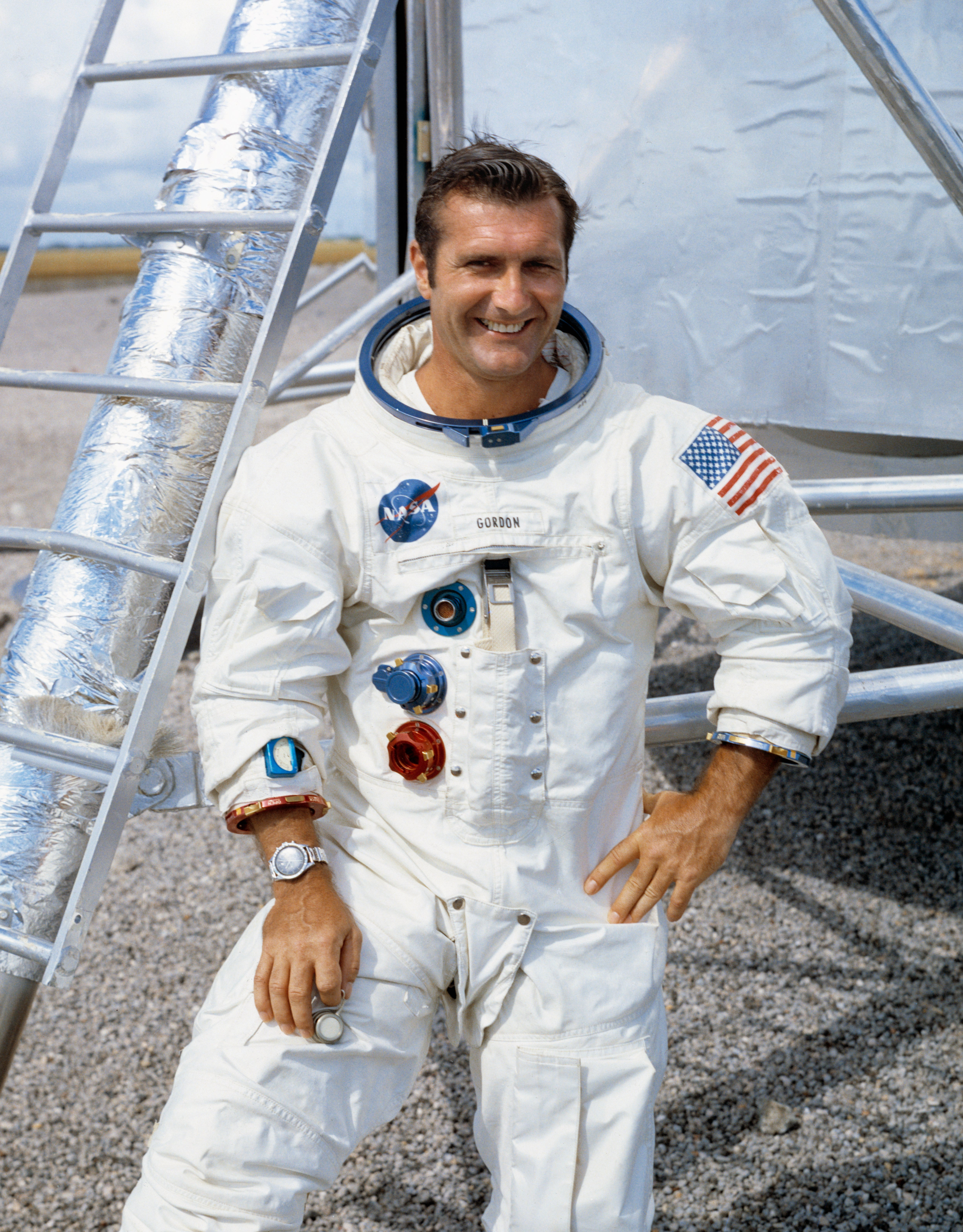
Richard F. Gordon Jr. NASA astronaut, crew member of Gemini 11 and Apollo 12

Notable alumni of the University of Washington include NFL football player Carl Fennema (1926); U.S. Olympic rower Joe Rantz (1936); architect Minoru Yamasaki (1934); news anchor and Big Sky resort founder Chet Huntley (1934); US Senator Henry M. Jackson (JD 1935); Baskin Robbins co-founder Irv Robbins (1939); former actor, The Hollywood Reporter columnist and TCM host Robert Osborne (1954); glass artist Dale Chihuly (BA 1965); serial killer Ted Bundy; Nobel Prize-winning biologists Linda B. Buck and Mary E. Brunkow; Pulitzer Prize-winning author Marilynne Robinson (PhD 1977), martial artist Bruce Lee; saxophonist Kenny G (1978); MySpace co-founder Chris DeWolfe (1988); Mudhoney lead vocalist Mark Arm (1985, English); Soundgarden guitarist Kim Thayil (Philosophy); music manager Susan Silver (Chinese); actor Rainn Wilson (BA, Drama 1986); radio and TV personality Andrew Harms (2001, Business and Drama); actor and comedian Joel McHale (BA, History 1995, MFA 2000), actor and Christian personality Jim Caviezel, former soccer player Megan Kufeld, basketball player Matisse Thybulle, and artist and professor Martina Lopez.

Among the faculty as of 2012, there have been 151 members of American Association for the Advancement of Science, 68 members of the National Academy of Sciences, 67 members of the American Academy of Arts and Sciences, 53 members of the Institute of Medicine, 29 winners of the Presidential Early Career Award for Scientists and Engineers, 21 members of the National Academy of Engineering, 15 Howard Hughes Medical Institute Investigators, 15 MacArthur Fellows, nine winners of the Gairdner Foundation International Award, five winners of the National Medal of Science, eight Nobel Prize laureates, five winners of Albert Lasker Award for Clinical Medical Research, four members of the American Philosophical Society, two winners of the National Book Award, two winners of the National Medal of Arts, two Pulitzer Prize winners, one winner of the Fields Medal, and one member of the National Academy of Public Administration. Among UW students by 2012, there were 136 Fulbright Scholars, 35 Rhodes Scholars, seven Marshall Scholars and four Gates Cambridge Scholars. UW is recognized as a top producer of Fulbright Scholars, ranking 2nd in the US in 2017.

== Sustainable energy initiatives ==
=== History of energy at UW ===
The first UW power plant was built simultaneously with some of the first campus buildings back in 1895, and was located to the east of campus along the existing shoreline of Lake Washington. The plant, which burned coal to produce steam to help heat and electrify the campus, was quickly replaced in 1901 as the campus’ energy needs began to grow.

This second power plant was located where the modern day Allen Library stands. It too used a coal and steam system, and was in use for 7 years before it was put to rest and a third plant was built.

This third power plant, which originally consisted of two 250 horsepower coal powered boilers, remains the current site for the University of Washington's central power plant. It is located opposite Montlake Boulevard from the Intramural Activities Building (IMA). The university started their switch from coal to natural gas in 1956 and finished in 1988, motivated by growing global environmental concerns and awareness.

An additional power plant, the West Campus Utility Plant (WCUP), was added to campus in 2017. This plant serves as a backup power supply to research buildings on Southwest campus, and generates and stores chilled water for cooling purposes. The current capacity of this plant is 6 megawatts of emergency power and 4,500 tons of chilled water, but is expandable to double the size of both reserves with no necessary building modifications. The WCUP was awarded the Envision Gold Award from the Institute for Sustainable Infrastructure for its sustainability focused building design and purposes.

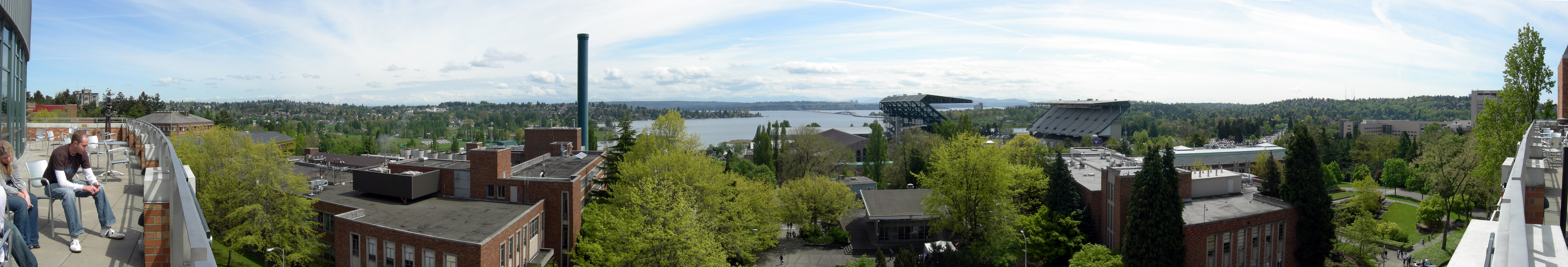
UW Power Plant Shown in panoramic view of East Campus

=== Current energy mix ===
Fossil fuels are still tightly embedded in energy systems across the world. This is reflected in the university's energy production, as they still rely on natural gas to heat most of its buildings, despite their clean energy goals and commitments.

It was found that as of 2024, 93% of the university's direct greenhouse gas emissions originated from the natural gas combustion system within the UW's central power plant. The heat produced using natural gas is transported through 8 miles of underground utility tunnels that connect to campus buildings, alongside side electrical lines, communication lines, and internet cables. Although electric chillers are already in place, which cool water down as a form of AC to then be pumped into buildings through the utility tunnels, the university hopes to switch the heating processes from natural gas to electric heat pumps in order to meet their clean energy goals.

In contrast from the current heating systems, most of the UW's electric power is supplied by Seattle City Light, who generates the majority of their electricity through hydroelectric systems. Other sources of energy include the previously mentioned WCUP for building cooling and emergency backup electricity, as well as a number of solar installations across campus. Buildings with solar installations include Mercer Court Alder Hall, Elm Hall, the Intramural Activities Building, Maple Hall, and the Life Sciences Building.

=== Energy goals ===
Although the majority of the university's electricity supply is carbon-free, the university hopes to completely phase out natural gas from their heating systems and to be fossil fuel free by 2035 in regard to their direct emissions.

Research shows that there are many aspects that contribute to universities energy consumption, such as student activity, technology use, building types, systems efficiency, and more. The university of Washington has addressed these aspects within their future energy goals. From late 2023 into the end of 2024, the University of Washington created an actionable energy systems decarbonization plan with the help from an outside energy consultant team who assisted in assessing the campuses energy needs, existing systems, and energy goals. The university's main energy-related goals include:

- Installing additional meters
- Upgrading building control systems
- Expanding data analytics
- Replacing old building chillers
- Add cold water storage
- Moving from a high temperature steam system to a lower temperature hot water system
- Installing heat pumps
- Increase solar capacity (such as installing solar parking lots)

== See also ==
- Friday Harbor Laboratories
- Internationales Kulturinstitut
- List of forestry universities and colleges
- Manastash Ridge Observatory
- Theodor Jacobsen Observatory
- University Book Store
- University of Washington Educational Outreach
- University of Washington firebombing incident
- University of Washington Information School
- Washington Escarpment – escarpment in Antarctica named for the university
