= Continuum College =

University of Washington Continuum College
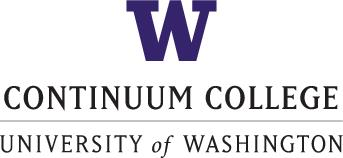
- Type: Public
- Established: 1912
- Affiliations: University of Washington
- Students: 54,311
- Location: Seattle, Washington, U.S.
- Campus: Urban city and also online
- Website: continuum.uw.edu

The University of Washington Continuum College, formerly the University of Washington Educational Outreach, is the continuing education and professional development unit of the University of Washington in Seattle.

== Location ==
The UW Continuum College offices are located in the University District, Seattle in the UW Tower (which was purchased from Safeco in 2006). Programs are run at the main UW campus and at various locations through UW Professional & Continuing Education.

The UW Continuum College is directed by Vice Provost Rovy Branon. Branon oversees a staff of approximately 250 people engaged in the development and administration of the UW's various programs.

== Programs ==
The UW Continuum College provides wide-ranging programs for non-traditional and lifelong learning students such as degree programs, certificate programs, and non-degree enrollment.

Its courses and programs include:

- UW Professional & Continuing Education
- Massive Open Online Courses (MOOCs) on Coursera and EdX
- UW in the High School, UW Summer Quarter, and UW Summer Youth
- UW International & English Language Programs
- Osher Institute for Lifelong Learning
- Coding bootcamp
- Conference Services.

The programs are fee-based and do not receive any state funds for support.

In 2017, UW Continuum College launched new professional certificate programs called Career Accelerator, making their most popular programs available in four formats: in-person, online, accelerated, and self-paced. It also created its first scholarship program, The UW Certificate Scholarship which covers 80 to 100% of course fees for applicants of select certificate programs who qualify.

In June 2022, UW Continuum College published its research into exploring the emergence of digital microcredentials, and its participation in the iterative design of such infrastructures.

FAST FACTS.
Enrollments: 132,721 (One student may have multiple enrollments)
Students Served: 54,311
Degrees Offered: 110 (fee-based)
Certificate Programs: 86
UW Continuum College Employees: Approximately 250 FTE

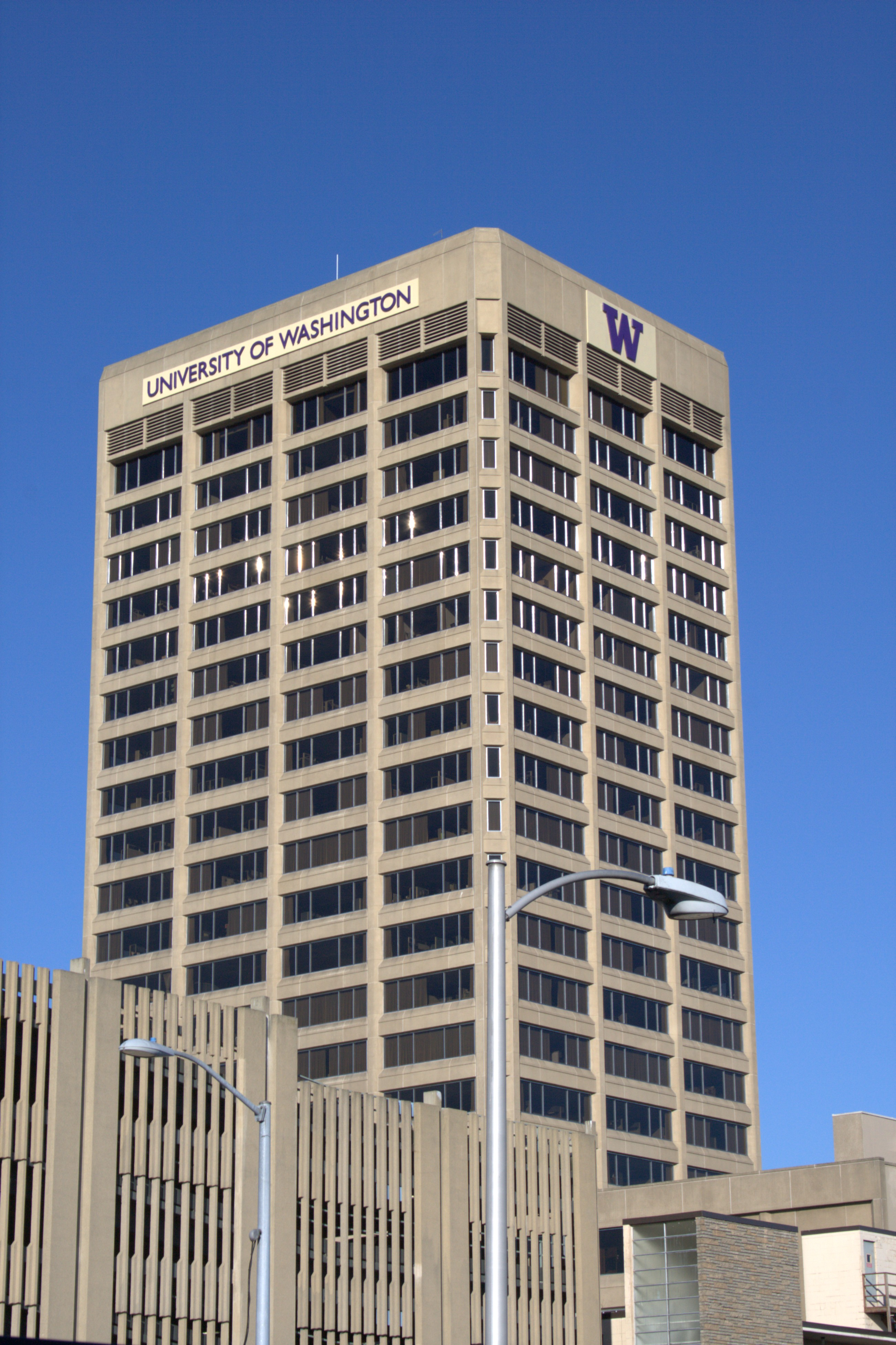
Continuum College is located in the UW Tower

== Media Mentions of UW Continuum College ==
- KGW8 TV appearance, “Advice for adult learners” (August 21, 2018)
- The Costco Connection article, “Certify yourself” (August 2018)
- Seattle Business article, “Extend Your Education: Lifelong Learning Is the New Reality for a Successful Career” (July 12, 2018)
- The evoLLLution article, “Addressing the Increasing Need for Non-Credit Programming: The University and True Lifelong Education” (June 8, 2018)
- Engineering Career Coach podcast, “How to Evaluate Which Professional Certificates Can Boost Your Career” (May 29, 2018)
- The Seattle Times article, “UW offers coding camp for people looking to shift careers” (May 10, 2018)
- Deseret News article, “What we can learn from the good-guy hackers” (May 2, 2018)
- The Daily article, “UW Continuum College shows that students can interact with UW at any age” (April 25, 2018)
- Tech Republic interview, “Questions developers should ask before jumping into a certificate program” (April 12, 2018)
- Crain's article, “If I Knew Then...” (March 8, 2018)
- Test and Code podcast, “Continuing Education and Certificate Programs at UW” (January 31, 2018)
- The News Tribune article, “How can I make a living without driving to Seattle? Report offers some hope.” (February 16, 2018)
- Puget Sound Business Journal article, “'Nothing is standing still anymore' in continuing education ” (December 8, 2017)
- The Seattle Times article, “Seattle’s newcomers vs. longtime residents: At least we both like the Seahawks” (September 21, 2017)
- Q13 Fox article, “New survey highlights the reason thousands are relocating to Seattle” (September 21, 2017)
- USA Today article, “Is going back to school right for you?” (September 17, 2017)
- Forbes article, “Going Back To College To Advance Your Career” (September 12, 2017)
- GeekWire article, “Working Geek: Business vet turned UW vice provost helps professionals learn in-demand tech skills” (June 14, 2017)
- U.S. News & World Report article, “Is Continuing Education Right for My Career?” (June 8, 2017)
- The Seattle Times article, “Making continuing education possible for more adults” (June 2, 2017)
