= Washington Huskies =

Intercollegiate sports teams of University of Washington

- University: University of Washington
- Nickname: Huskies
- NCAA: Division I (FBS)
- Conference: Big Ten (primary); MPSF (men's rowing, beach volleyball)
- Athletic director: Patrick Chun
- Location: Seattle, Washington
- Varsity teams: 22
- Football stadium: Husky Stadium
- Basketball arena: Hec Edmundson Pavilion
- Baseball stadium: Husky Ballpark
- Softball stadium: Husky Softball Stadium
- Soccer stadium: Husky Soccer Stadium
- Other venues: Conibear Shellhouse; Dempsey Indoor; Lloyd Nordstrom Tennis Center
- Colors: Purple and gold
- Mascot: Dubs, Harry the Husky
- Fight song: Bow Down to Washington
- Website: gohuskies.com

Big Ten logo in Washington's colors

The Washington Huskies are the intercollegiate athletic teams that represent the University of Washington, located in Seattle. The school competes at the National Collegiate Athletic Association (NCAA) Division I level as a member of the Big Ten Conference.

Washington students, sports teams, and alumni are called Huskies. The husky was selected as the school mascot by the Associated Students of UW in 1922. It replaced the "Sun Dodger", an abstract reference to the local weather that was quickly dropped in favor of something more tangible. The costumed "Harry the Husky" performs at sporting and special events, and a live Alaskan Malamute, currently named Dubs, traditionally leads the football team onto the field at the start of games. The school colors of purple and gold were adopted in 1892 by student vote. The choice was purportedly inspired by the first stanza of Lord Byron's The Destruction of Sennacherib.

On-campus facilities include Husky Stadium (football), Alaska Airlines Arena (basketball, gymnastics and volleyball), Husky Ballpark (baseball), Husky Softball Stadium (softball), the Nordstrom Tennis Center, the Dempsey Indoor practice facility, and the Conibear Shellhouse (rowing). Recently added was the Husky Track located just north of the Husky Ballpark. The golf team's home course is at the Washington National Golf Club in Auburn. "Montlake" is used as a metonym for the athletic department and its teams, with most on-campus facilities located north of the Montlake Cut and on or near Montlake Boulevard in Seattle.

== Sports sponsored ==
Men's sports	Women's sports
Baseball	Softball
Basketball	Basketball
Cross country	Cross country
Golf	Golf
Rowing	Rowing
Soccer	Soccer
Tennis	Tennis
Track and field^{†}	Track and field^{†}
Football	Gymnastics
	Volleyball
	Beach volleyball
† – Track and field includes both indoor and outdoor

The University of Washington sponsors teams in nine men's and twelve women's NCAA-sanctioned sports, plus men's rowing, primarily competing in the Big Ten Conference, with men's rowing in the Intercollegiate Rowing Association and both track and field programs in the Mountain Pacific Sports Federation.

=== Baseball ===
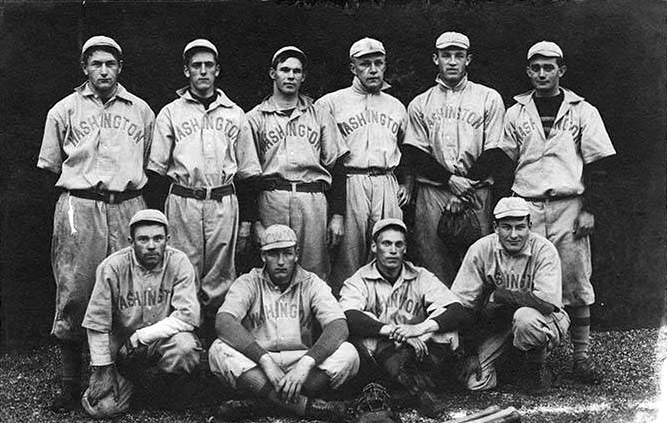
1910 Washington baseball team

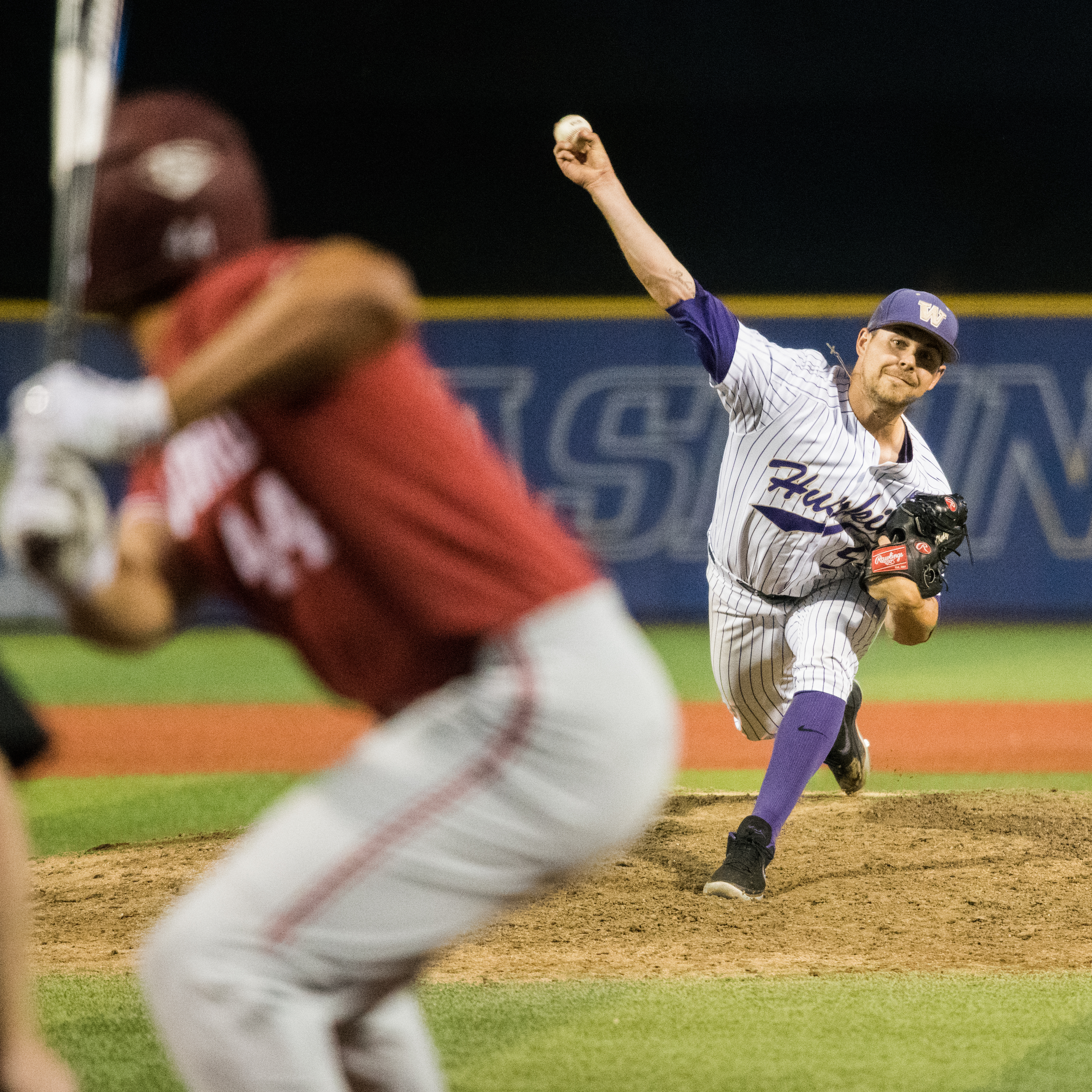
A Huskies pitcher throws to a Stanford batter during a game in 2018

Pacific Coast Conference Championships (2)
1919, 1922

Pacific Coast Conference North Division Championships (8)
1923, 1925, 1926, 1929, 1930, 1932, 1952, 1959

Pac-10 North (6)
1981, 1992, 1993, 1996, 1997, 1998

Pac-12 Championships (2)
1997, 1998

=== Men's basketball ===
NCAA Championships
National Champion: (None)
Final Four: 1953
Sweet 16: 1984, 1998, 2005, 2006, 2010
Pac-12 Regular Season Titles (12)
1931, 1934, 1943, 1944 (tie), 1948, 1951, 1953, 1984 (tie), 1985 (tie), 2009, 2012, 2019
Pac-12 Tournament Championships (3)
2005, 2010, 2011

=== Women's basketball ===
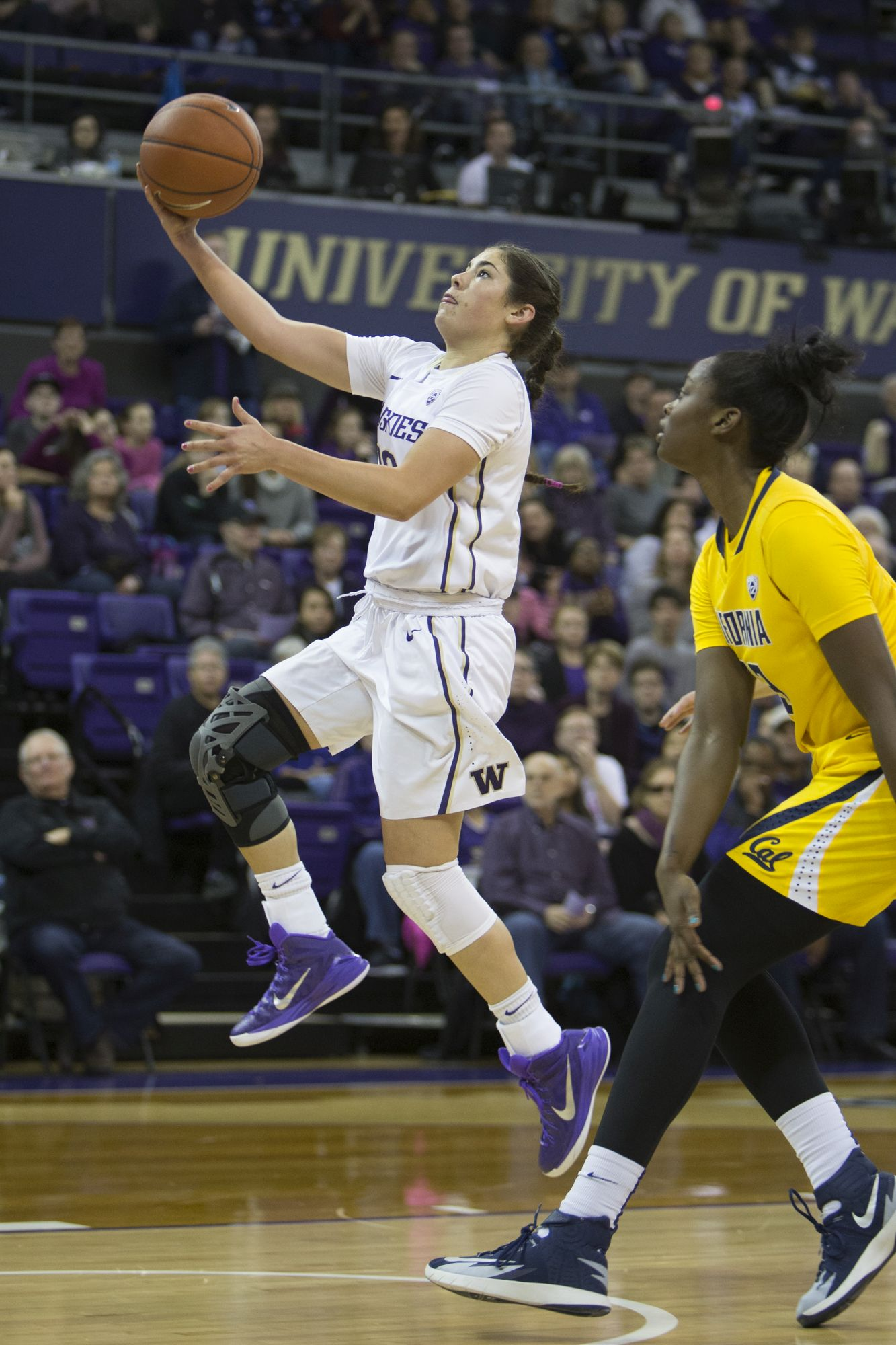
Kelsey Plum in a Washington game in 2015

NCAA Championships
National Champion: (None)
Final Four: 2016
Elite Eight: 1990, 2001, 2016
Sweet 16: 1988, 1991, 1995, 2001, 2016, 2017
NWBL (Coast Division) Regular Season Titles (1)
1978
NorPac Regular Season Titles (2)
1985, 1986
Pac-10 Regular Season Titles (3)
1988, 1990(t), 2001(t)
NorPac Tournament Championships (1)
1985

=== Women's cross country ===
NCAA Championships (1)
2008

NCAA West Region Championships (6)
1989, 1992, 2008, 2009, 2010, 2011

Pac-12 Championships (4)
1989, 2008, 2009, 2023

=== Men's cross country ===
Pac-12 Championships (1)
1993

West Regional Champions (1)
2015

NCAA Championships
National Champion: (None)
Top Ten: 2015

=== Football ===
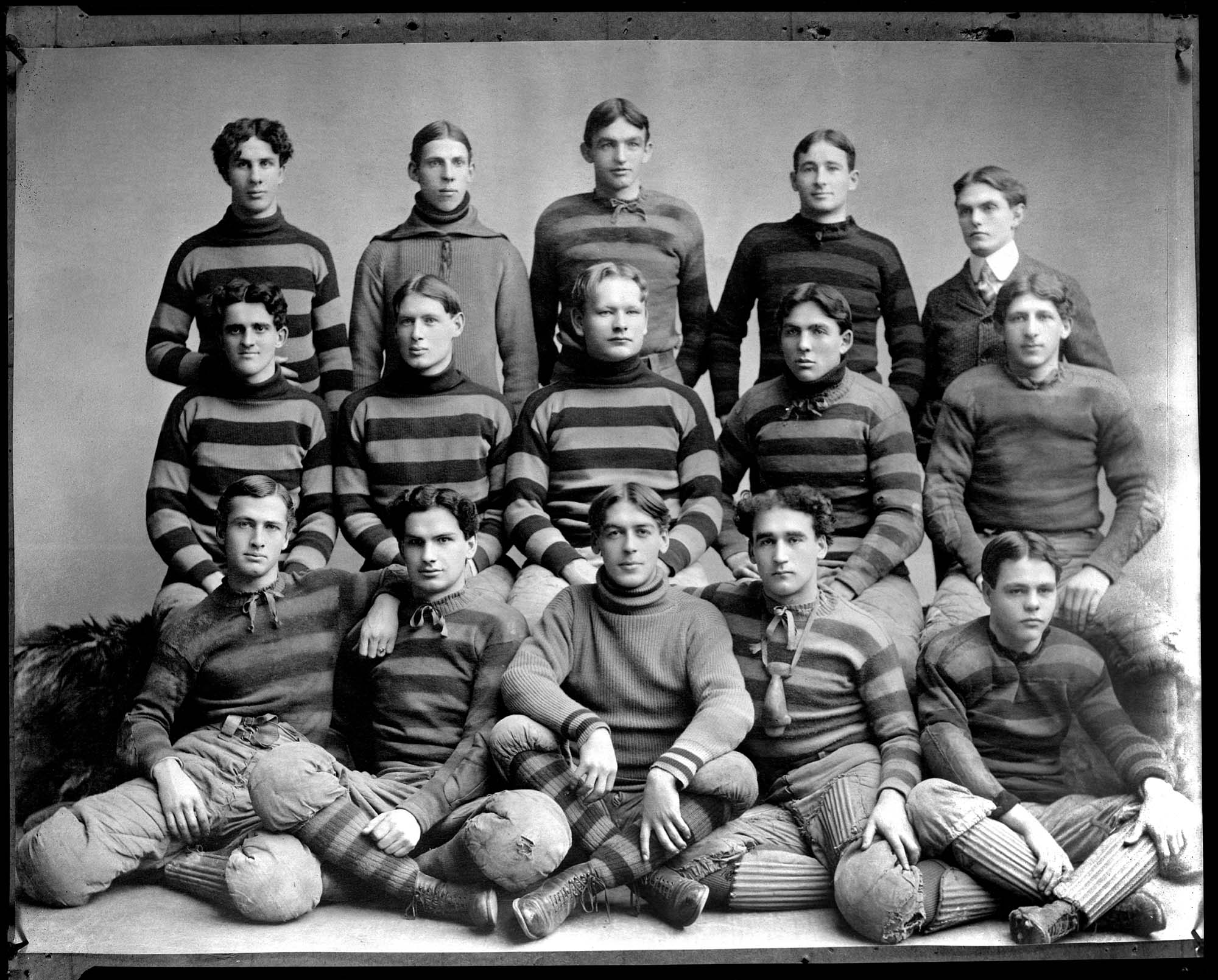
Washington football team of 1898

The university football team's first game was in 1889.

On November 20, 1903 Chief Joseph and his nephew Red Thunder watched a game that ended 2 - 0, a score on safety and Washington victory, and he concluded that "I saw a lot of white men almost fight today. I do not think this good. I feel pleased that Washington won the game. Those men I would think would break their legs and arms, but they did not get mad. I had a good time at the game with my white friends." This both spirited approval and set a precedent for many victories, as during this period, Washington won 40 games in a row under coach Gil Dobie, currently the second longest winning streak in NCAA Division I-A history. From 1907 to 1917, Washington football teams were unbeaten in 64 consecutive games, an NCAA Division I-A record. In 1916, Dobie finished his remarkable coaching career at Washington with an undefeated 58–0–3 record.

The 1925 team posted an undefeated record but lost to Alabama 21–20 in the Rose Bowl. The 1960 team finished 10–1, under coach Jim Owens, and won its second consecutive Rose Bowl by defeating national champion Minnesota 17–7 (the national champion was declared before the bowl games in 1960). Coach Owens served from 1957 to 1974. Don James became head coach in 1975 and transformed the team into a national power while compiling a 153–57–2 record. James' first successful year was in 1977 with the team quarterbacked by Warren Moon culminating in a 27–20 victory over Michigan in the Rose Bowl. Washington and Michigan played again in the 1981 Rose Bowl, a 23–6 loss. The next year, the Huskies returned to the Rose Bowl and defeated Iowa 28–0, the last Rose Bowl shutout and the only shutout in the past half century. Following a two-year hiatus during which cross-state rival WSU prevented the Huskies from Rose Bowl appearances by defeating them in the last game of the 1982 and 1983 seasons, in 1984 Washington posted an 11–1 record and beat Oklahoma 28–17 to win the Orange Bowl. Senior running back, Jacque Robinson won the MVP award and was the first player to win MVP awards for both the Orange and Rose Bowls.

The 1991 team is considered to be the best Washington Husky football team and among the best in college football history. The team went undefeated, winning against opponents by an average score of 42–9 in regular season, including wins over No. 9 Nebraska, No. 7 California and a 34–14 win over No. 4 Michigan in the Rose Bowl. In 2000, Washington finished with an 11–1 record, and won its seventh Rose Bowl under the leadership of Marques Tuiasosopo.

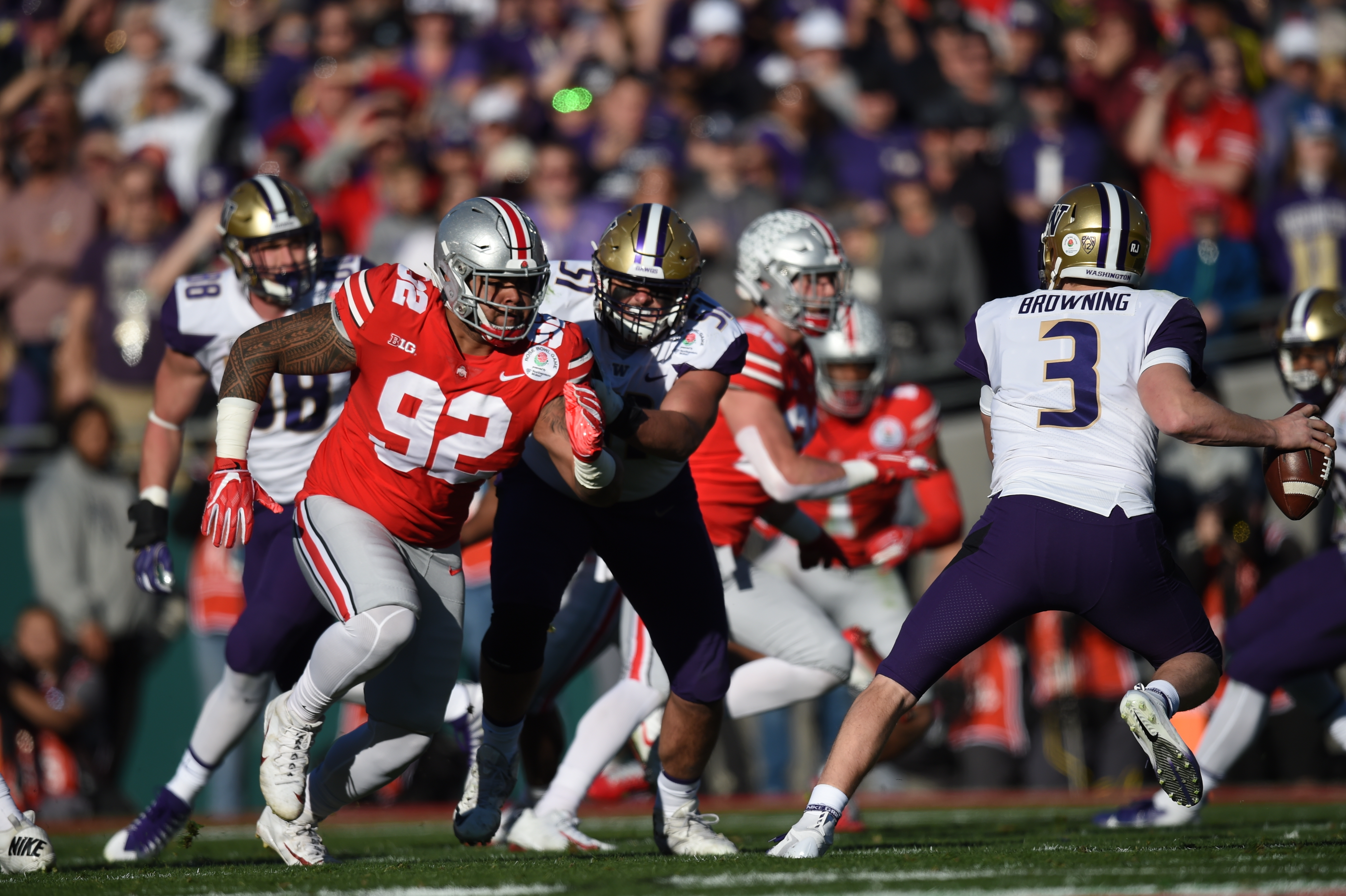
Washington v Ohio State, 2019 Rose Bowl

Washington officially claims two national championships in football: 1960 and 1991. Washington was selected in 1960 by the Helms Athletic Foundation and in 1991 by the Coaches Poll and other selectors.

National Championships (2)
1960, 1991
Pac-12 titles (18)
1916, 1919, 1925, 1936, 1959 (tie), 1960, 1963, 1977, 1980, 1981, 1990, 1991, 1992 (tie), 1995 (tie), 2000 (tie), 2016, 2018, 2023
Bowl history
18 wins, 17 losses, 1 tie

=== Men's golf ===
The men's golf team has won seven Pac-12 Conference championships: 1961, 1963, 1988, 2005, 2009, 2010, 2022. James Lepp won the NCAA (individual) Championship in 2005.

=== Women's golf ===
The women's golf team won their first NCAA national championship in 2016 by beating Stanford 3–2. In 1961 Judy Hoetmer won the women's national intercollegiate individual golf championship (an event conducted by the Division of Girls' and Women's Sports through 1981, the first year of the rival NCAA women's golf championship).

=== Rowing ===
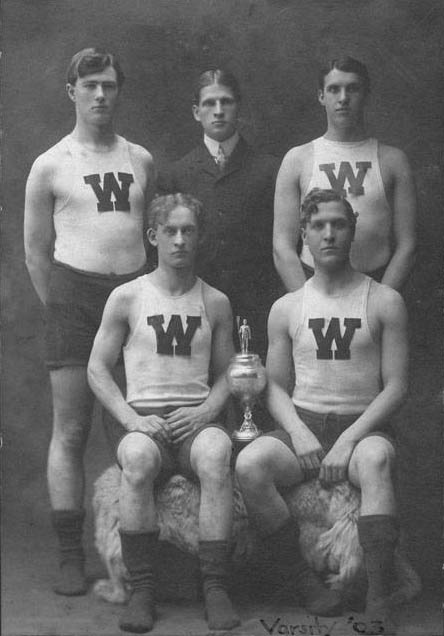
1903 rowing team

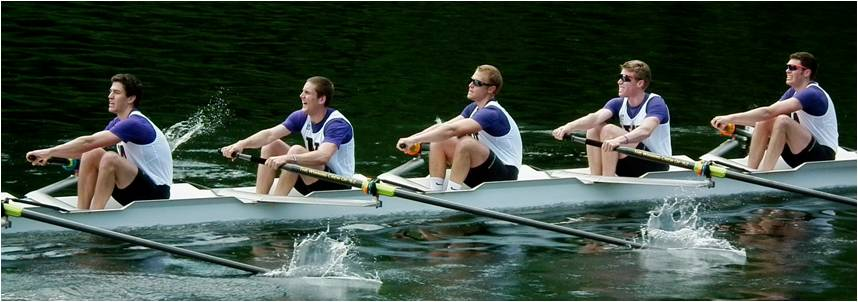
Men's crew at the 2012 Windermere Cup

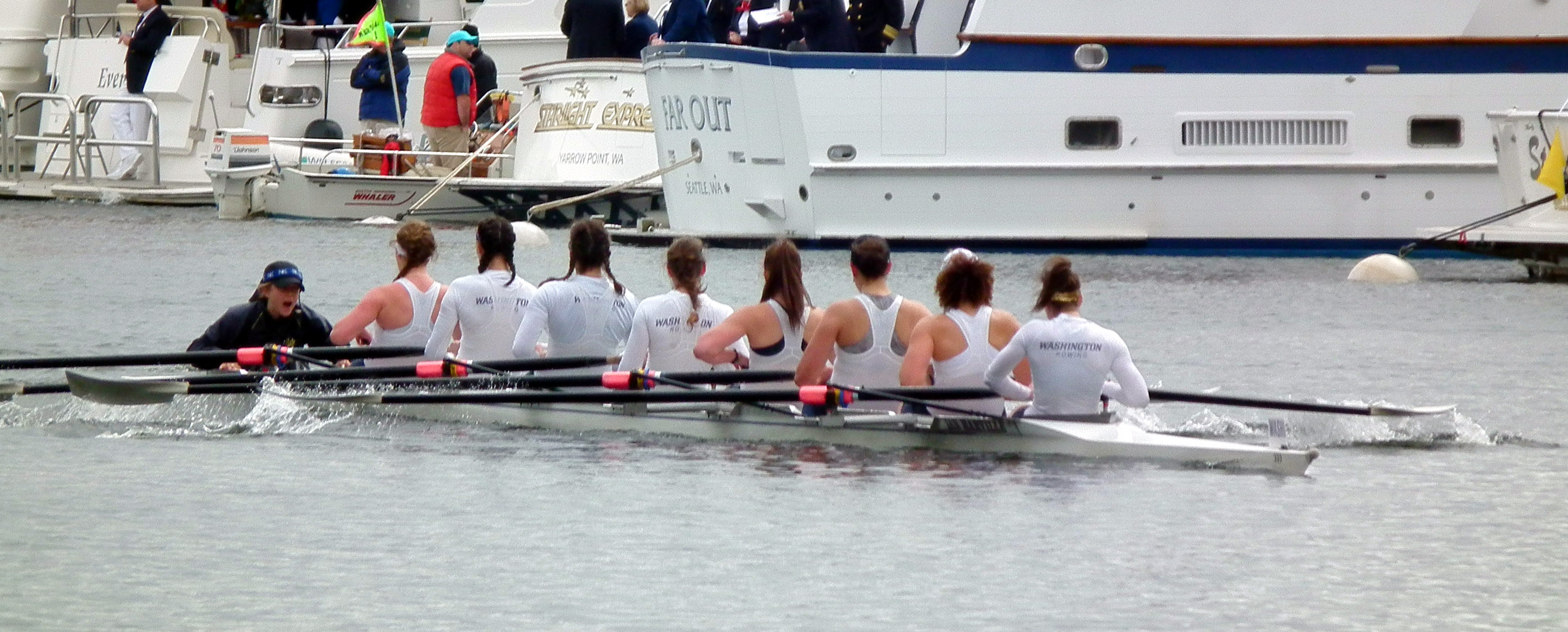
Women's crew at the Opening Day of Boating Season, 2011

The University of Washington rowing is a longstanding tradition at the UW dating back to 1899. The Washington men's crew won the gold medal at the 1936 Summer Olympics in Berlin, defeating the German and Italian crews, chronicled in the 2013 nonfiction book The Boys in the Boat and its film adaptation.

The crew's traditional rival is the University of California Golden Bears, the other West Coast rowing power, with whom they compete in an annual dual regatta.

Women's NWRA Open Championships
Varsity Eight: top college finisher – 1971 (2nd overall), 1972 (4th overall)
Novice Eight: 1979
Varsity Four: 1979
Lightweight Eight: 1971, 1972, 1973
Lightweight Four: 1969, 1970, 1973

Women's Collegiate National Champions (NWRA/USRowing) held 1980–1996
Varsity Eight: 1981, 1982, (Note: Simultaneous AIAW championship, the only one conducted.) 1983, 1984, 1985, 1987, 1988
Junior Varsity Eight: 1981, 1982, 1983, 1987, 1989, 1994
Varsity Four: 1980
Lightweight Eight: 1980, 1987
Lightweight Four: 1980

Women's NCAA Championships (1997, 1998, 2001, 2017, 2019)
Varsity Eight: 1997, 1998, 2001, 2002, 2017, 2019
Junior Varsity Eight: 2002, 2017, 2019, 2021
Varsity Four: 1999, 2000, 2001, 2008, 2017, 2019, 2021

Women's Pac-12 Championships
Varsity Eight: 1977, 1980, 1981, 1982, 1983, 1984, 1985, 1986, 1987, 1988, 1989, 1990, 1992, 1993, 1994, 1995, 1996, 1997, 1998, 1999, 2000, 2001, 2002, 2017, 2018, 2021
Junior Varsity Eight: 1982, 1983, 1984, 1985, 1986, 1987, 1988, 1989, 1992, 1993, 1994, 1997, 1998, 1999, 2000, 2001, 2002, 2014, 2017, 2018, 2019, 2021
Novice Eight: 1978, 1979, 1980, 1982, 1983, 1985, 1986, 1987, 1990, 1991, 1992, 1993, 1995, 1996, 1997, 1998, 1999, 2000, 2005, 2009, 2010, 2013, 2014, 2017, 2018, 2019, 2021
Varsity 4: 1977, 1979, 1981, 1983, 1985, 1986, 1987, 1988, 1992, 1994, 1995, 1999, 2000, 2004, 2007, 2008, 2010, 2017, 2018, 2019

Women's Big-10 Championships
Varsity Eight: 2025
Junior Varsity Eight: 2025
Novice Eight: 2025
Varsity 4: 2025

Men's IRA Championships
Varsity Eight: 1923, 1924, 1926, 1936, 1937, 1940, 1941, 1948, 1950, 1970, 1997, 2007, 2009, 2011, 2012, 2013, 2014, 2015, 2021, 2024, 2025, 2026
Junior Varsity Eight: 1925, 1926, 1927, 1935, 1936, 1937, 1938, 1940, 1948, 1949, 1950, 1953, 1956, 1964, 1972, 1993, 1995, 1997, 2004, 2005, 2007, 2008, 2009, 2010, 2011, 2012, 2013, 2015, 2017, 2018, 2021, 2025
Freshman Eight/Third Varsity Eight: 1931, 1934, 1935, 1936, 1937, 1939, 1947, 1948, 1949, 1950, 1951, 1953, 1961, 1969, 1997, 2001, 2002, 2006, 2009, 2011, 2012, 2013, 2014, 2015, 2016, 2017, 2018, 2019, 2021

Men's National Collegiate Rowing Championship held 1982–1996
Varsity Eight: 1984

Men's unofficial national championships
Varsity Eight: 1933, (Note: IRA regatta was not held in 1933 due to the Depression. The first college 2000-meter national championship ever held was conducted in June 1933 by local businessmen on the Olympic course in Long Beach, California, as a substitute. Washington raced both Harvard and Yale for the first time at this event and defeated Yale by eight feet to win the championship.) 1977, 1978, 1981

Men's Pac-12 Championships
Varsity Eight: 1962, 1963, 1965, 1966, 1968, 1969, 1971, 1972, 1973, 1974, 1975, 1976, 1977, 1978, 1979, 1980, 1981, 1983, 1984, 1985, 1990, 1991, 1992, 1993, 1994, 1995, 1996, 1997, 2003, 2004, 2007, 2008, 2011, 2012, 2013, 2014, 2015, 2017, 2018, 2019, 2021
Junior Varsity Eight: 1962, 1963, 1964, 1965, 1966, 1970, 1971, 1973, 1974, 1975, 1978, 1979, 1984, 1985, 1986, 1988, 1989, 1992, 1993, 1994, 1995, 1996, 1997, 2004, 2005, 2007, 2008, 2009, 2010, 2011, 2012, 2013, 2015, 2017, 2018, 2019, 2021
Third Varsity Eight: 2015, 2016, 2017, 2018, 2019, 2021
Freshman Eight: 1961, 1965, 1968, 1969, 1970, 1971, 1972, 1973, 1974, 1976, 1977, 1978, 1979, 1984, 1985, 1986, 1988, 1990, 1992, 1994, 1997, 2001, 2002, 2008, 2009, 2010, 2012, 2013, 2014, 2015, 2019, 2021
Varsity 4: 1978, 1979, 1989, 1990, 1992, 1993, 1995, 1996, 1997, 1998, 1999, 2000, 2004, 2005, 2009, 2010, 2011, 2012, 2014, 2015, 2017, 2018, 2019, 2021

=== Men's soccer ===
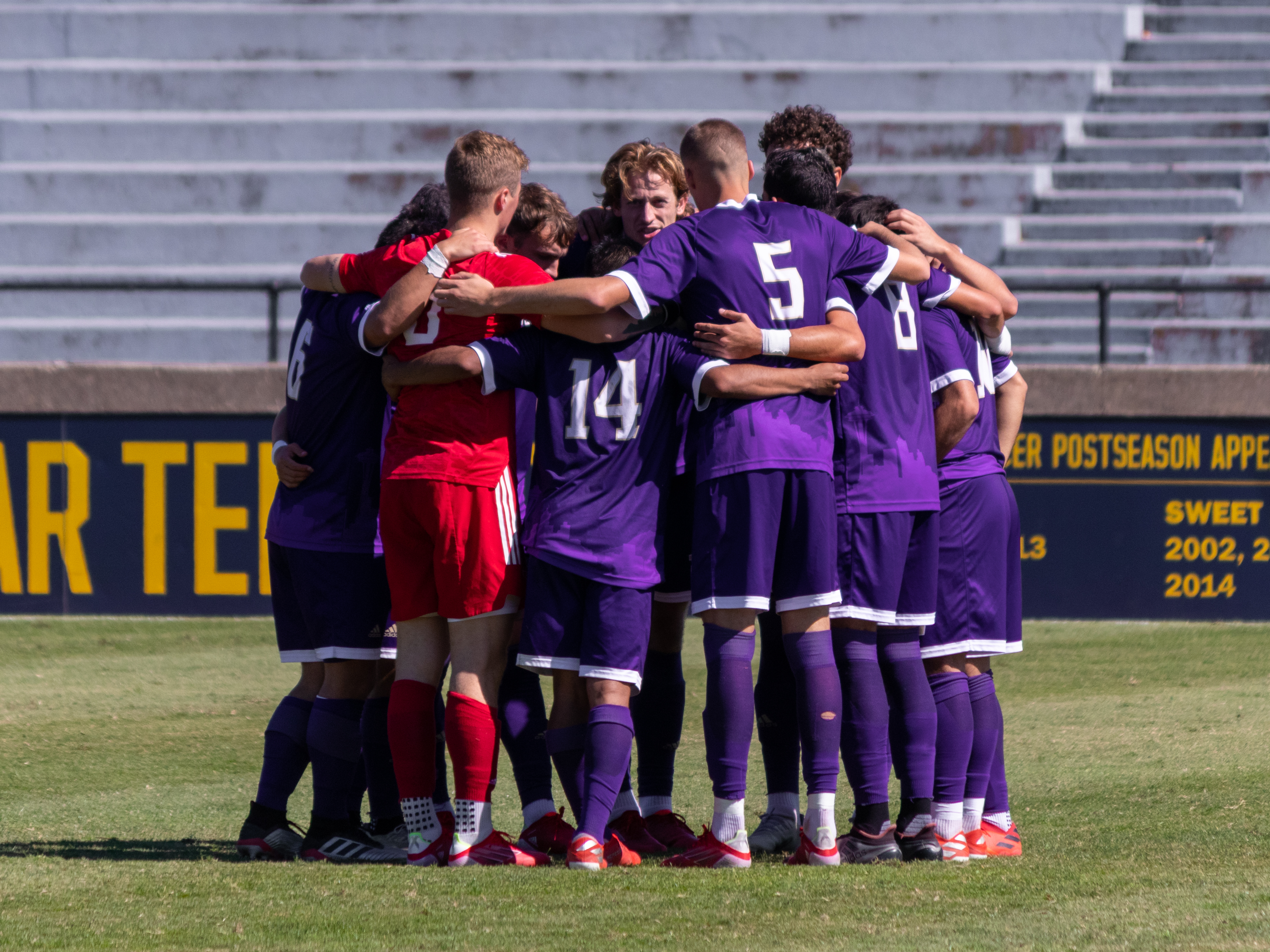
Huskies' men's soccer in a huddle during the 2021 season.

National Championships (1)
2025

Pac-12 Championships (13)
1968, 1972, 1973, 1976, 1982, 1983, 1985, 1987, 1992, 1998, 1999, 2000, 2013, 2019, 2020

=== Softball ===
NCAA Championships (1)
Championships: (2009)
Title games: 1996, 1999, 2009, 2018
Pac-12 Championships (4)
1996, 2000, 2010, 2019

=== Men's tennis ===
Pac-12 Championships (39)
1938, 1939, 1941, 1942, 1943, 1946, 1947, 1948, 1949, 1950, 1951, 1952, 1953, 1954, 1955, 1956, 1957, 1977, 1978, 1979, 1980, 1981, 1982, 1983, 1984, 1985, 1986, 1987, 1988, 1989, 1990, 1991, 1992, 1993, 1994, 1995, 1996, 1997, 2005

=== Women's tennis ===
Pac-12 Championships
1987, 1988, 1989, 1990, 1991, 1992, 1993, 1994, 1995, 1996, 1997

=== Volleyball ===
NCAA Championships (1)
2005

Pac-12 Championships
1980, 2004, 2005, 2013, 2015, 2016

== Former sports ==
=== Swimming ===
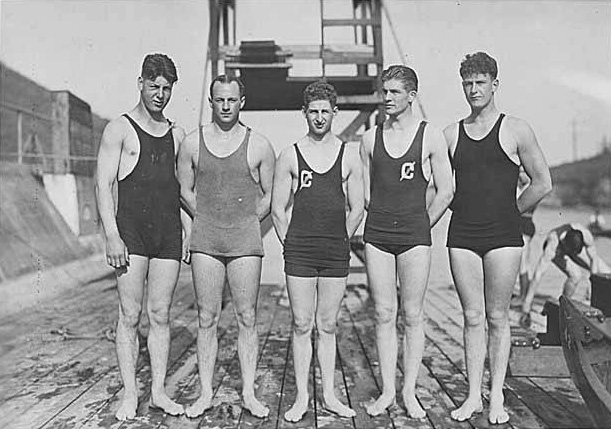
Photograph of the 1921 swim team by Webster and Stevens

The University of Washington swimming team dates back to 1932 when the men's team was founded. The women's team was founded in 1975. In 2009 the athletic department announced both the men's and women's programs would be eliminated due to a $2.8 million budget cut in the athletic department. In 2000 the it was announced that both the men's and women's team would be cut but an outpouring of mail and phone calls, plus concern in the media about discontinuing the sport, led to a reversal of the decision and both programs were reinstated. In 1975 UW announced it was cutting the men's team, citing financial issues involved in having to implement a new women's program to comply with Title IX and decreasing revenue from a shaky economy and a struggling football team. The men's team was reinstated a couple of months later but with fewer scholarships.

Throughout the history of the swimming programs at UW there were many successful athletes to compete for the Huskies. The UW swimming program produced several Olympic medalists. These include Jack Medica, Rick and Lynn Colella, Rick DeMont, Doug Northway, and Robin Backhaus. In the 1970's the men's team had multiple top five finishes at the NCAA championship meet. In 2008, the year before the program was eliminated, the women's team finished 15th while the men's team finished 16th at the NCAA championship.

=== Wrestling ===
The men's wrestling team at Washington was cut in 1980. The highlight of the program came in 1972 when UW wrestler Larry Owings defeated Dan Gable of Iowa State in the NCAA 142-pound championship. Gable, a senior competing in his final college match, had been undefeated in seven years and 181 matches of high-school and college wrestling. Gable never would lose again, including in the 1972 Olympics when he was unscored upon on his way to a gold medal. The upset over Gable by Owings was called "one of the most unforgettable moments in the history of the sport and possibly all sport" by The Chicago Tribune.

As a team the Huskies won three Pac-8 championships and finished in the top 10 at the NCAA national meet several times. The Amateur Wrestling News rated Washington among the 20 best college programs of the 1970s.

== Notable non-varsity sports ==
=== Boxing ===
Both the men's and women's boxing teams compete in the National Collegiate Boxing Association. The Huskies won the very first NCBA national women's championship in 2014, and won again in 2015 and 2016.

=== Rugby ===
Founded in 1963, the University of Washington Husky Rugby Club plays college rugby in Division 1 in the Northwest Collegiate Rugby Conference against local rivals such as Washington State and Oregon. The Huskies won the Northwest championship in 1996, 2002, 2004 and 2005 and the D1AA Varsity Cup in 2014. The Huskies rugby team is partially funded by an endowment from the alumni association.

=== Lacrosse ===
The University of Washington Husky Lacrosse Club plays college lacrosse in the Division 1 of the Men's Collegiate Lacrosse Association (MCLA) against local rivals such as Washington State, Oregon, Oregon St. and Western Washington. The Lacrosse team plays their home games on the IMA fields, and are regularly attended and popular amongst UW students; especially when in-state rival, Washington St. comes into town. The Husky's Lacrosse team is funded by annual dues paid by the players, as well as assistance from the IMA, and fundraisers.

== National championships ==
The Washington Huskies have won 10 NCAA team championships, 37 non-NCAA rowing national championships (1 AIAW), and 10 other team national championships. They also claim 2 national championships in college football. The championships are as follows:

=== NCAA team championships ===
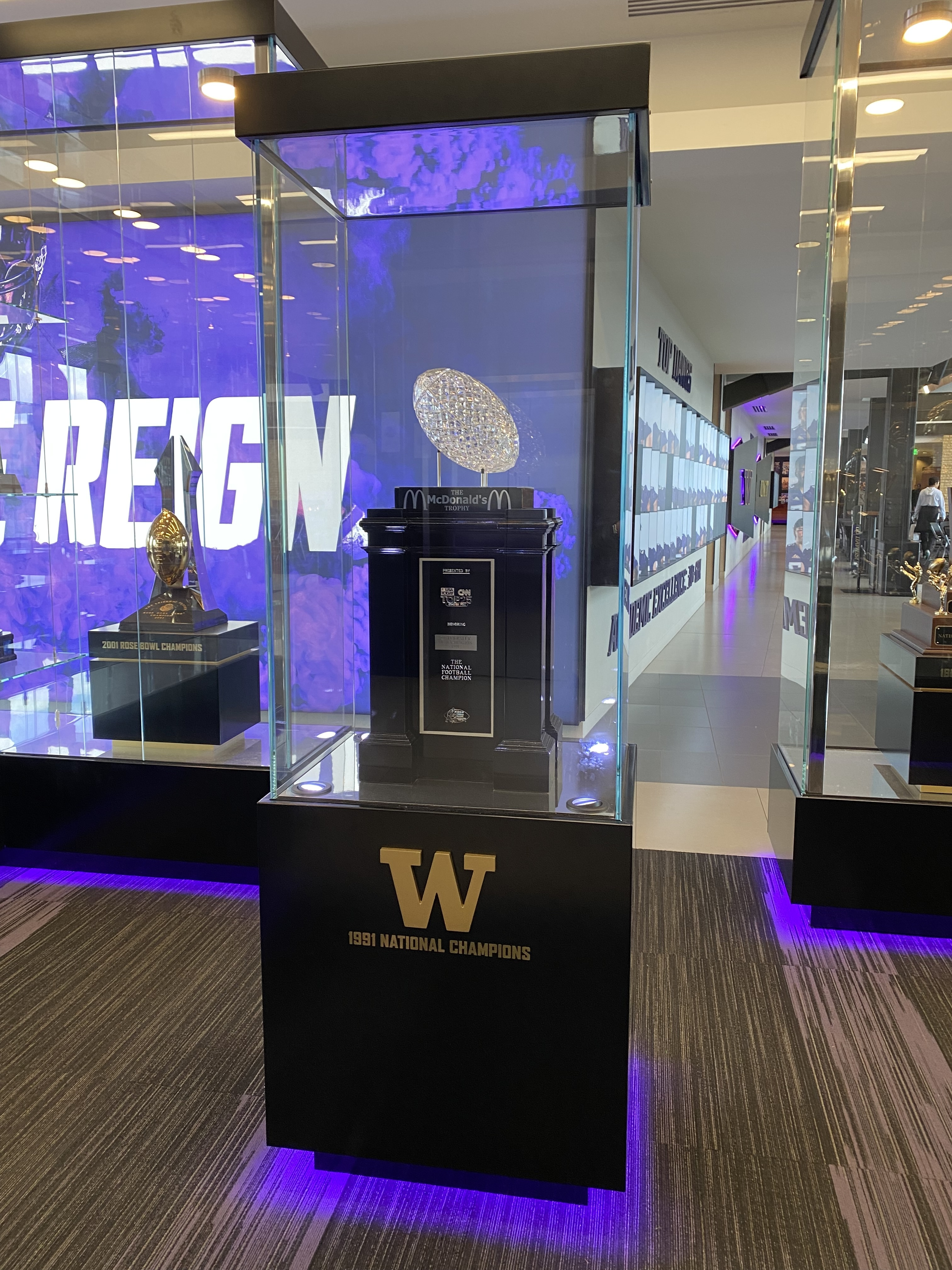
1991 Coaches Poll national championship trophy on display inside Husky Stadium

Sport	NCAA Championships
Men’s Soccer	2025
Women's Volleyball	2005
Women's Cross Country	2008
Softball	2009
Women's Golf	2016
Women's Rowing	1997, 1998, 2001, 2017, 2019

=== Football ===
Washington claims two national championships in college football: 1960 and 1991.

The 1960 team was selected by the Helms Athletic Foundation following Washington's victory over AP and UPI national champion Minnesota in the 1961 Rose Bowl. In that era, the final wire service polls were taken at the end of the regular season.

The 1991 team finished No. 1 in the Coaches Poll and earned The Coaches' Trophy as well as the NFF MacArthur Bowl and the FWAA Grantland Rice Trophy. The title was split, with the AP Poll selecting Miami (FL).

Year	Coach	Selector	Record	Bowl	Opponent	Result	Final AP	Final Coaches
1960	Jim Owens	Helms Athletic Foundation	10–1	Rose Bowl	Minnesota	W 17–7	No. 6	No. 5
1991	Don James	B(QPRS), BR, DeS, DuS, FN, FWAA, MGR, NCF, R(FACT), SR, UPI/NFF, USAT/CNN	12–0	Rose Bowl	Michigan	W 34–14	No. 2	No. 1

In addition to their claimed titles, NCAA-designated "major selectors" also selected Washington for 1984 and 1990.

=== Rowing ===
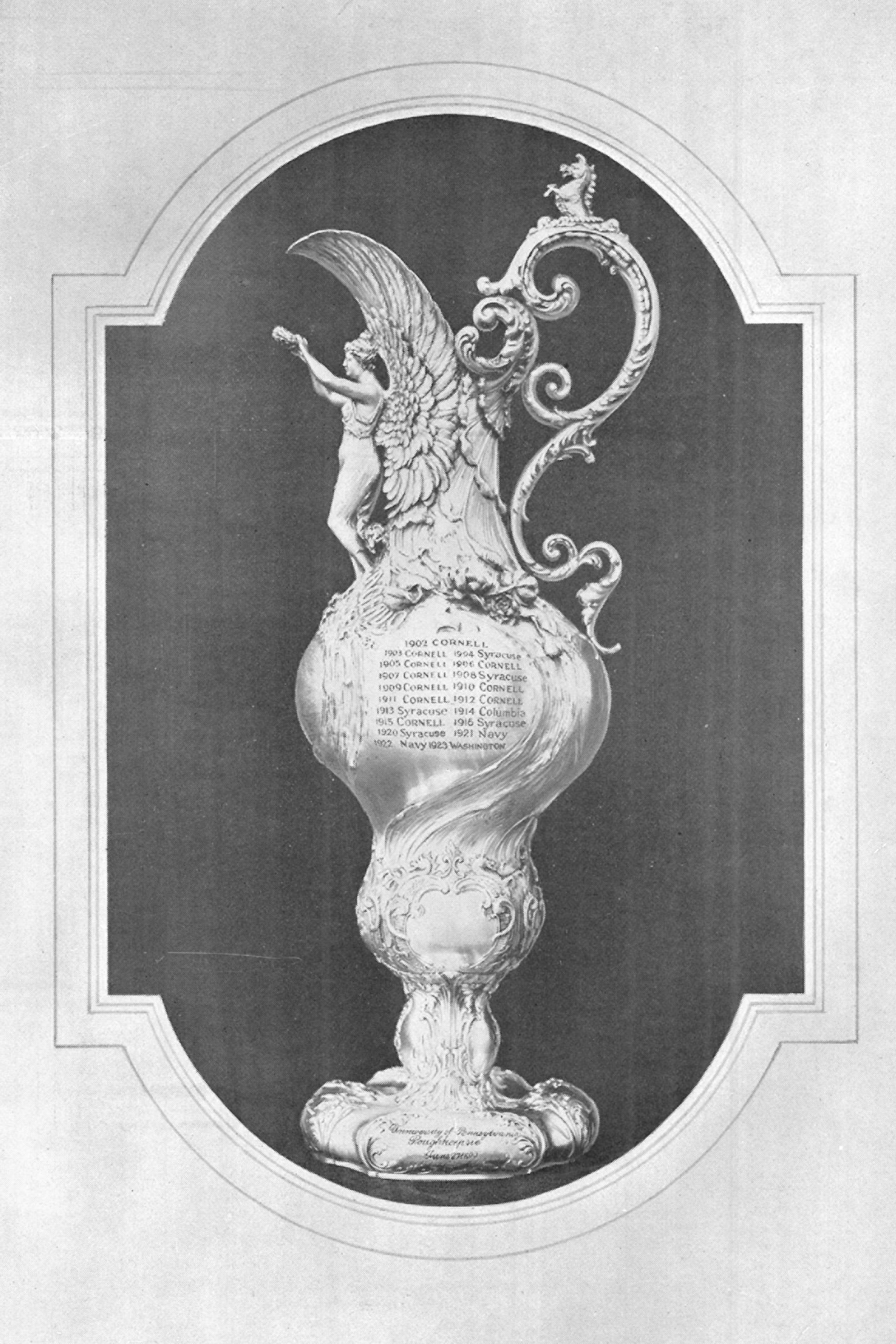
Washington was the first western crew to win the Poughkeepsie Regatta for the IRA championship, in 1923.

Washington was the first western crew to win the Intercollegiate Rowing Association (IRA) men's varsity heavyweight eight championship, winning the Varsity Challenge Cup at the 1923 Poughkeepsie Regatta. The IRA was founded in 1891, predating the National Collegiate Athletic Association (NCAA) by 14 years, and continues to govern men's college rowing in the United States. Washington has won 22 IRA championships, second all-time behind Cornell. The IRA regatta was not held in 1933 due to the Great Depression, but the Huskies won in a replacement national championship event held at Long Beach Marine Stadium.

Sport	Championship	Years
Men's Rowing	IRA	1923, 1924, 1926, 1936, 1937, 1940, 1941, 1948, 1950, 1970, 1997, 2007, 2009, 2011, 2012, 2013, 2014, 2015, 2021, 2024, 2025, 2026
Men's Rowing	NCRC	1984
Men's Rowing	Other	1933
Women's Rowing	NWRA	1981, 1983, 1984, 1985, 1987, 1988
Women's Rowing	AIAW	1982
Women's Rowing	NCAA	1997, 1998, 2001, 2017, 2019

=== Other ===
Washington won 7 National Rifle Association intercollegiate team championships prior to the introduction of the NCAA Rifle Championship in 1980.

The Huskies won the 1940–1942 intercollegiate championship ski meets held at Sun Valley, Idaho, prior to the first NCAA Skiing Championship in 1954.

Sport	Championships
Men's Rifle*	1925, 1932
Women's Rifle	1923, 1924, 1925, 1933, 1934
Men's Skiing	1940, 1941, 1942
* indoor, telegraphic format

== Nickname and mascot ==
In the university's early history, Washington athletic teams were unnamed. Local sportswriters dubbed the varsity teams the "Vikings", "Indians", "Cougars", and other names in their headlines.

=== Sun Dodgers ===
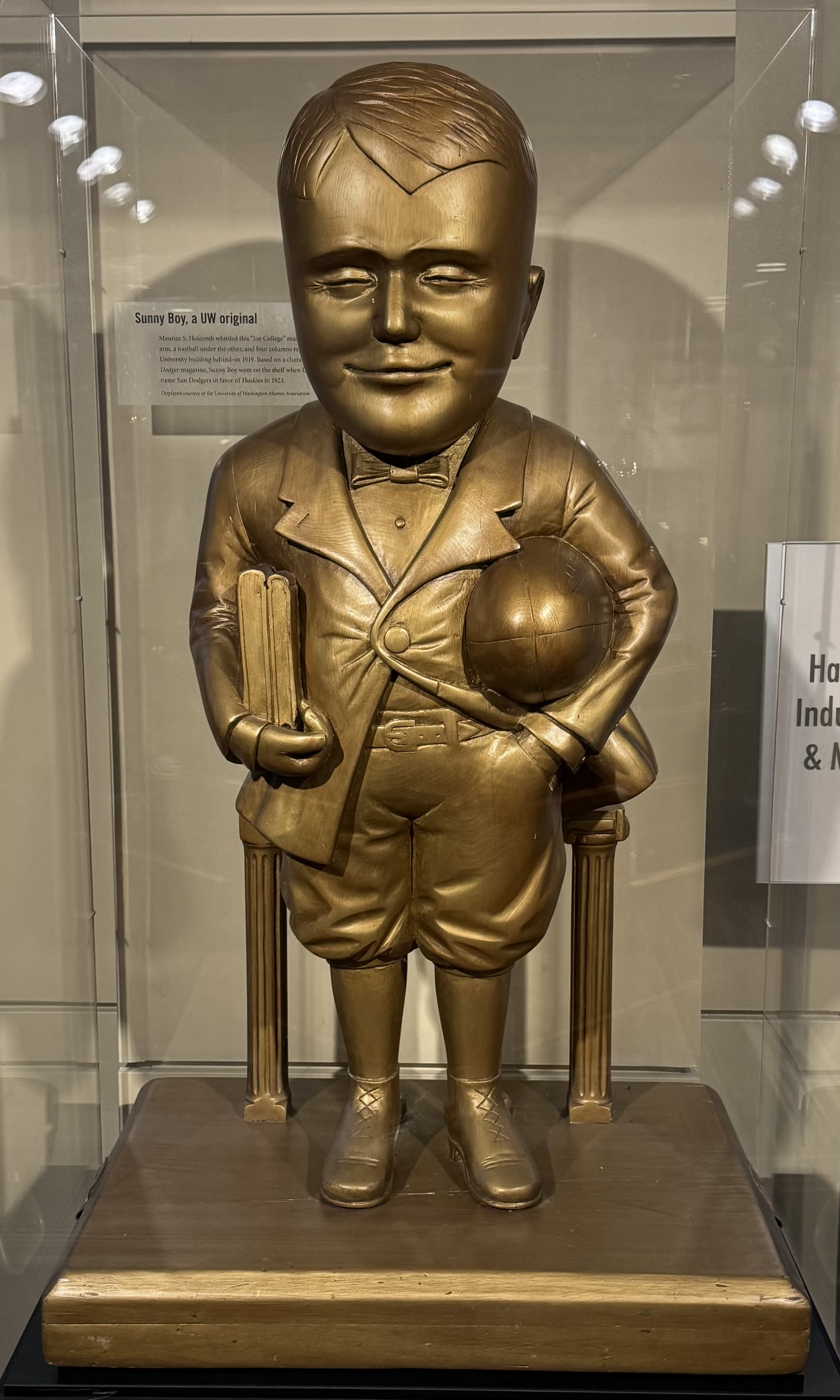
Sunny Boy figure in the Husky Hall of Fame at Hec Edmundson Pavilion

On January 28, 1920, the Associated Students of the University of Washington (ASUW) chose the Sun Dodgers as the official nickname of varsity athletic teams at the university. The name ranked first from a list of names submitted to the 3,233 voters.

The Sun Dodgers nickname was suggested by students and sportswriters in November 1919 before coming up for the vote. The name was derived from Sun Dodger, a campus humor magazine published by the students, and as a tongue-in-cheek allusion to the city of Seattle's rainy weather.

The Sun Dodgers were represented by the mascot Sunny Boy, a 3.5 foot gold-painted wooden statue of a Washington undergraduate standing in front of the university's four columns. After being stolen from a fraternity trophy room and missing for decades, Sunny Boy was rediscovered in South Bend and returned to the Huskies prior to the 1948 game versus Notre Dame.

Seattle newspapers ran joint editorials on December 25, 1921, calling for the retirement of "Sun Dodgers" and proposing "Vikings" as a new nickname for Washington's athletic teams. The Seattle Post-Intelligencer wrote that Sun Dodgers "lacks punch" and that "nobody knows what it means, anyway." The new name was said to be supported by head football coach Enoch Bagshaw and professor Edmond S. Meany, among other coaches, athletes, and administrators. The newspapers immediately began using "Vikings" in their headlines.

Upon returning to campus following Christmas vacation, students were surprised to learn that their teams had been renamed without consultation. "Vikings" was quickly abandoned. With "Sun Dodgers" having been found unsuitable, a joint committee of students, coaches, faculty, alumni, and businessmen was assembled in order to choose a permanent name for the university's athletic teams.

=== Huskies ===
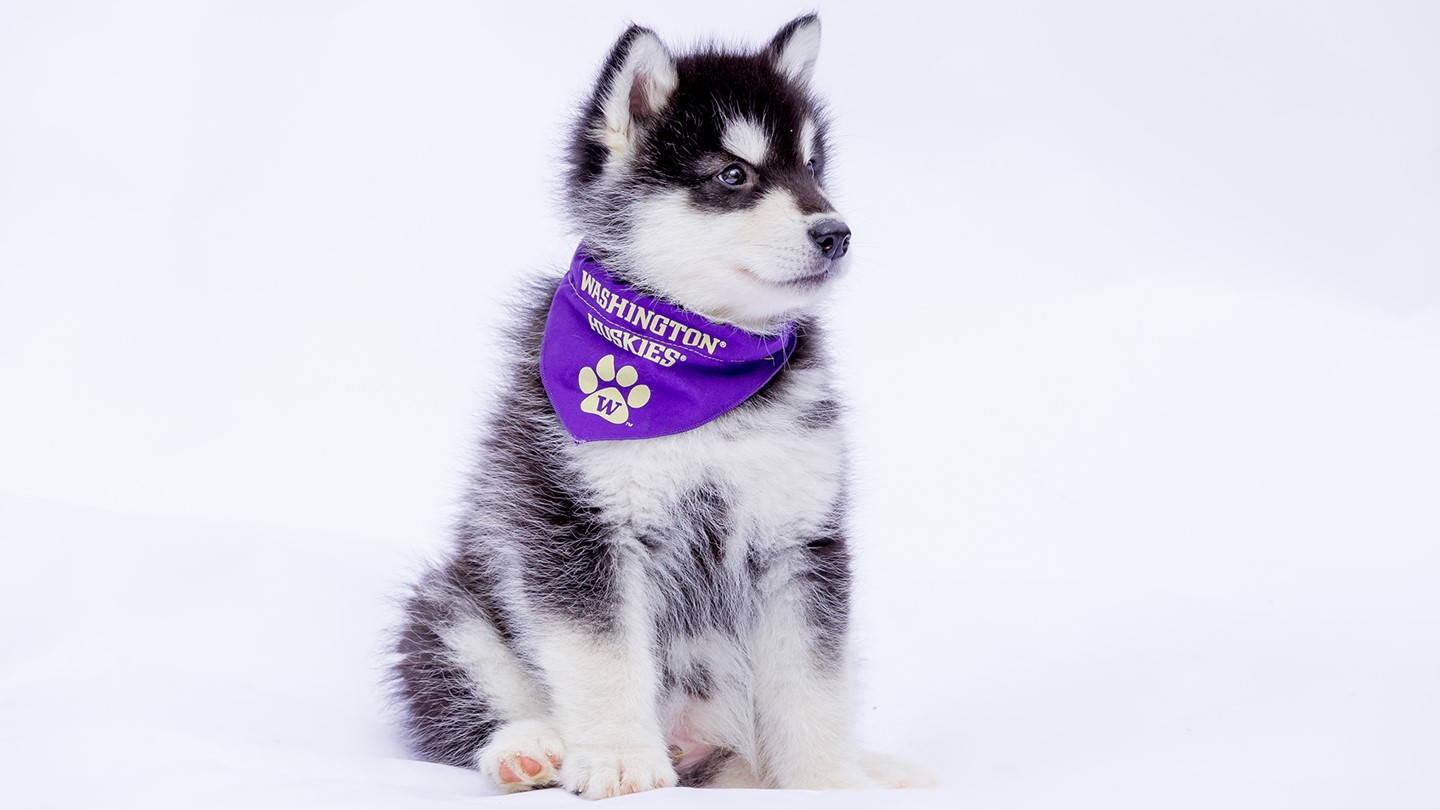
Unveiling image for Dubs II, UW Mascot

UW teams were first introduced as the Huskies on February 3, 1922, during the halftime intermission of a basketball game vs. Washington State. The newly christened Huskies beat the Cougars, who adopted their nickname in 1919, by a score of 40–10.

The "Husky" nickname was the selection of the committee formed to replace "Sun Dodger". Other suggested names considered by the committee were "Wolves", "Malamutes", "Tyees", "Vikings", "Northmen", and "Olympics".

The Husky was likely chosen due to its relative ease to draw, short name for use in newspapers at the time, and it represented the ferocity of the athletic program. The ASUW felt that The Husky was a true representation of the Seattle area because many viewed Seattle as the "Gateway to the Alaskan frontier", a phrase dating back to the Alaskan Gold Rush.

==== Live mascot ====
Dubs (first of his name) became the Husky mascot in 2009. He is an Alaskan Malamute from Burlington, Washington and was born in November 2008. Following tradition, an online vote was conducted at GoHuskies.com for the name. With more than 20,000 votes cast, "Dubs II" was chosen.

Dubs II was officially unveiled as Dubs' successor on March 23, 2018 (National Puppy Day). He had been selected from a group of 90 puppies to become the 14th live mascot for the University of Washington. Dubs continued to fill in as mascot during the 2018 season, with his final performance leading the team out of the tunnel during Senior Day 2018 (though he later reappeared in a home game against the Oregon Ducks in 2019). Dubs II took over at halftime leading the football team out against the Oregon State Beavers.

Dubs II is present before every home Husky football game.
