= 1997 NCAA Rowing Championships =

Tournament information
- Sport: Collegiate rowing
- Location: (California) Rancho Cordova, CA
- Dates: May 31, 1997–June 1, 1997
- Venue(s): Lake Natoma; Sacramento State Aquatic Center

Final positions
- Champions: Washington (1st NCAA title)
- 1st runners-up: Princeton
- 2nd runners-up: Brown

Tournament statistics
- Varsity Fours: Brown
- Varsity Eights: Princeton (2V8); Washington (1V8)

The 1997 NCAA Rowing Championships were contested at the first annual NCAA-sanctioned regatta to determine the team national champions of women's collegiate crew in the United States.

This regatta was held on May 31, 1997 at Lake Natoma near Rancho Cordova, California.

== I Varsity Eight results ==
=== 1V8 Grand and Petite Finals ===
Grand Final			Petite Final		
Place	Team	Time	Place	Team	Time
1.	Washington	6:31.8	7.	Harvard	6:50.3
2.	Massachusetts	6:37.0	8.	Yale	6:51.9
3.	Princeton	6:39.2	9.	Oregon State	6:53.3
4.	Brown	6:40.5	10.	Dartmouth	6:55.6
5.	Virginia	6:40.9	11.	Rutgers	6:57.8
6.	California	6:52.0	12.	Syracuse	7:01.2
	[]		13.	Northeastern	7:01.4
	[]		14.	Georgetown	7:05.1
	[]		E	UC Davis	Unknown
	[]		E	William Smith	Unknown

=== 1V8 Semi-finals ===
- Note: Top 3 to Grand Final; Bottom 3 to Petite Final

Semifinal #1 of 2			Semifinal #2 of 2		
Place	Team	Time	Place	Team	Time
1.	Washington	6:41.6	1.	Princeton	6:41.4
2.	Brown	6:46.6	2.	Virginia	6:45.6
3.	Massachusetts	6:50.3	3.	California	6:49.6
4.	Yale	6:55.3	4.	Oregon State	6:50.3
5.	Dartmouth	7:03.9	5.	Harvard	6:56.5
6.	Northeastern	7:50.3	6.	Rutgers	6:57.8

=== 1V8 Repechage ===
- Note: Top 3 to Semifinals, next 2 to Petite Finals, Last 2 eliminated

Rep 1
Place	Team	Time
1.	Yale	7:01.2
2.	Northeastern	7:04.0
3.	Rutgers	7:04.5
DNQ	Syracuse	Unknown
DNQ	Georgetown	Unknown
Eliminated	UC Davis	Unknown
Eliminated	William Smith	Unknown

=== 1V8 Heats ===
- Note: Top 3 to semifinals; rest to reps

Heat 1			Heat 2			Heat 3		
Place	Team	Time	Place	Team	Time	Place	Team	Time
1.	Washington	6:30.5	1.	Massachusetts	6:29.2	1.	Princeton	6:40.8
2.	Brown	6:35.9	2.	Virginia	6:35.7	2.	Harvard	6:45.7
3.	California	6:47.2	3.	Oregon State	6:37.8	3.	Dartmouth	6:46.9
4.	William Smith	6:54.5	4.	Northeastern	6:41.5	4.	Rutgers	6:48.1
5.	UC Davis	7:04.5	5.	Georgetown	6:44.9	5.	Yale	6:59.8
			6.	Syracuse	6:44.9			

== II Varsity results ==
=== 2V8 Grand and Petite final ===
Grand Final			Petite Final		
Place	Team	Time	Place	Team	Time
1.	Princeton	6:59.9	7.	Oregon State	7:11.4
2.	Washington	7:03.2	8.	Dartmouth	7:19.0
3.	Virginia	7:06.5			
4.	Rutgers	7:09.4			
5.	Yale	7:11.9			
6.	Brown	7:12.7			

=== 2V8 Repechage ===
- Note: Top 2 to Grand Final, Bottom 2 to Petite Final

Repechage
Place	Team	Time
1.	Brown	7:02.5
2.	Yale	7:05.4
3.	Oregon State	7:07.5
4.	Dartmouth	7:08.6

=== 2V8 Varsity Eight Heats ===
- Note: Top 2 to Grand Final, Bottom 2 to Repechage

Heat 1			Heat 2		
Place	Team	Time	Place	Team	Time
1.	Washington	6:50.0	1.	Princeton	6:56.4
2.	Virginia	6:51.4	2.	Rutgers	6:57.3
3.	Brown	6:57.2	3.	Oregon State	6:58.9
4.	Yale	7:03.9	4.	Dartmouth	7:06.5

== Varsity Four results ==
=== 1V4 Grand and Petite Finals ===
Grand Final			Petite Final		
Place	Team	Time	Place	Team	Time
1.	Brown	7:24.5	7.	Connecticut College	7:57.1
2.	Washington	7:25.1	8.	Ohio State	8:01.2
3.	Sacramento State	7:37.1	9.	Tennessee	8:05.4
4.	Iowa	7:39.7	10.	Ithaca College	8:07.2
5.	Princeton	7:43.7	11.	Virginia	8:07.4
6.	MIT	8:12.2	12.	Johns Hopkins	8:012.2

=== 1V4 Varsity Four Semi-finals ===
Semifinal #1 of 2			Semifinal #2 of 2		
Place	Team	Time	Place	Team	Time
1.	Washington	7:38.8	1.	Sacramento State	6:57.5
2.	Brown	7:42.4	2.	MIT	8:00.2
3.	Iowa	7:54.3	3.	Princeton	8:01.5
4.	Ohio State	8:01.2	4.	Tennessee	8:10.8
5.	Connecticut College	8:02.2	5.	Ithaca College	8:12.4
6.	Virginia	8:10.4	6.	Johns Hopkins	8:13.4

=== 1V4 Varsity Four Repechages ===
Rep 1
Place	Team	Time
1.	Ohio State	8:09.6
2.	Virginia	8:13.5
3.	Tennessee	8:15.0
DNQ	Dartmouth	Unknown
DNQ	Yale	Unknown
DNQ	Oregon State	Unknown
DNQ	Rutgers	Unknown
DNQ	Temple	Unknown

  - Confusion about where the Tennessee 4 came from, as they were not listed in the heats. There may be confusion between Temple and Tennessee. Please update if you have more information

=== 1V4 Varsity Four Heats ===
- Note: Top 3 to Semifinals; Bottom 3 to Repechage

Heat 1			Heat 2			Heat 3		
Place	Team	Time	Place	Team	Time	Place	Team	Time
1.	Brown	7:32.9	1.	Iowa	7:57.1	1.	Sacramento State	7:47.0
2.	Washington	7:33.6	2.	Ithaca College	8:01.0	2.	MIT	7:49.0
3.	Princeton	7:50.6	3.	Johns Hopkins	8:04.4	3.	Connecticut College	7:54.0
4.	Virginia	7:58.1	4.	Temple	8:04.8	4.	Ohio State	7:55.0
5.	Rutgers	8:00.0	5.	Oregon State	8:15.4	5.	Dartmouth	8:19.0
						6.	Yale	8:26.0

== See also ==
- List of NCAA rowing programs
