= Harry the Husky =

Mascot for the university of Washington

- Team: Huskies
- University: University of Washington
- Conference: Big Ten Conference
- Related mascot(s): Dubs, Sunny Boy

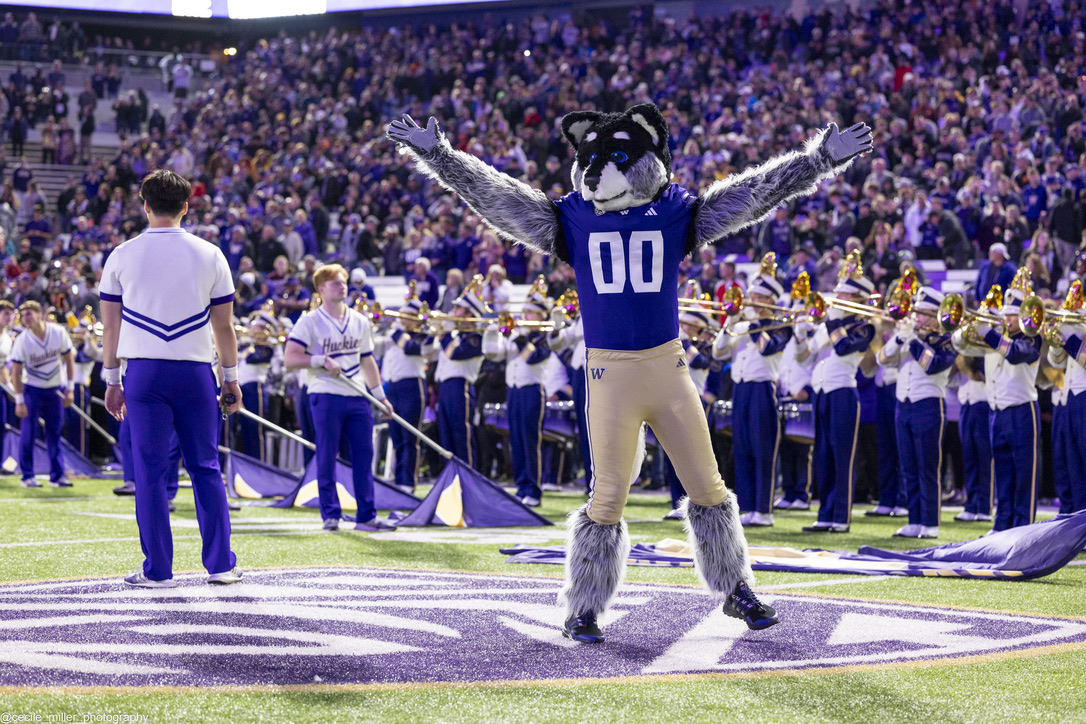
The current University of Washington Mascot Harry the Husky

Harry the Husky is the athletic mascot for the University of Washington and is one of two mascots utilized by the university, with the other being the live mascot Dubs II. Harry the Husky has two other siblings: Hendrix the Husky of UW Tacoma, and Holly the Husky of UW Bothell.

== History ==
The university's first mascot was Sunny Boy, a 3-foot-tall (0.91 m), gold-painted statuette representing an illustration frequently appearing in the pages of Sun Dodger, a student-published campus humor magazine. The mascot was introduced in 1921 and retired three years later when it got lost in Bush Auditorium, and the university adopted the nickname "Huskies."

In 1922, the university began using live sled dogs as its mascots, first a non-hereditary line of Siberian Huskies and, beginning in 1961, a hereditary line of Alaskan Malamutes, which are a different breed of dog from the husky. Due to the size of the animals, difficulties of travel, logistics, and handler schedules, the mascots generally only appear at home football games.

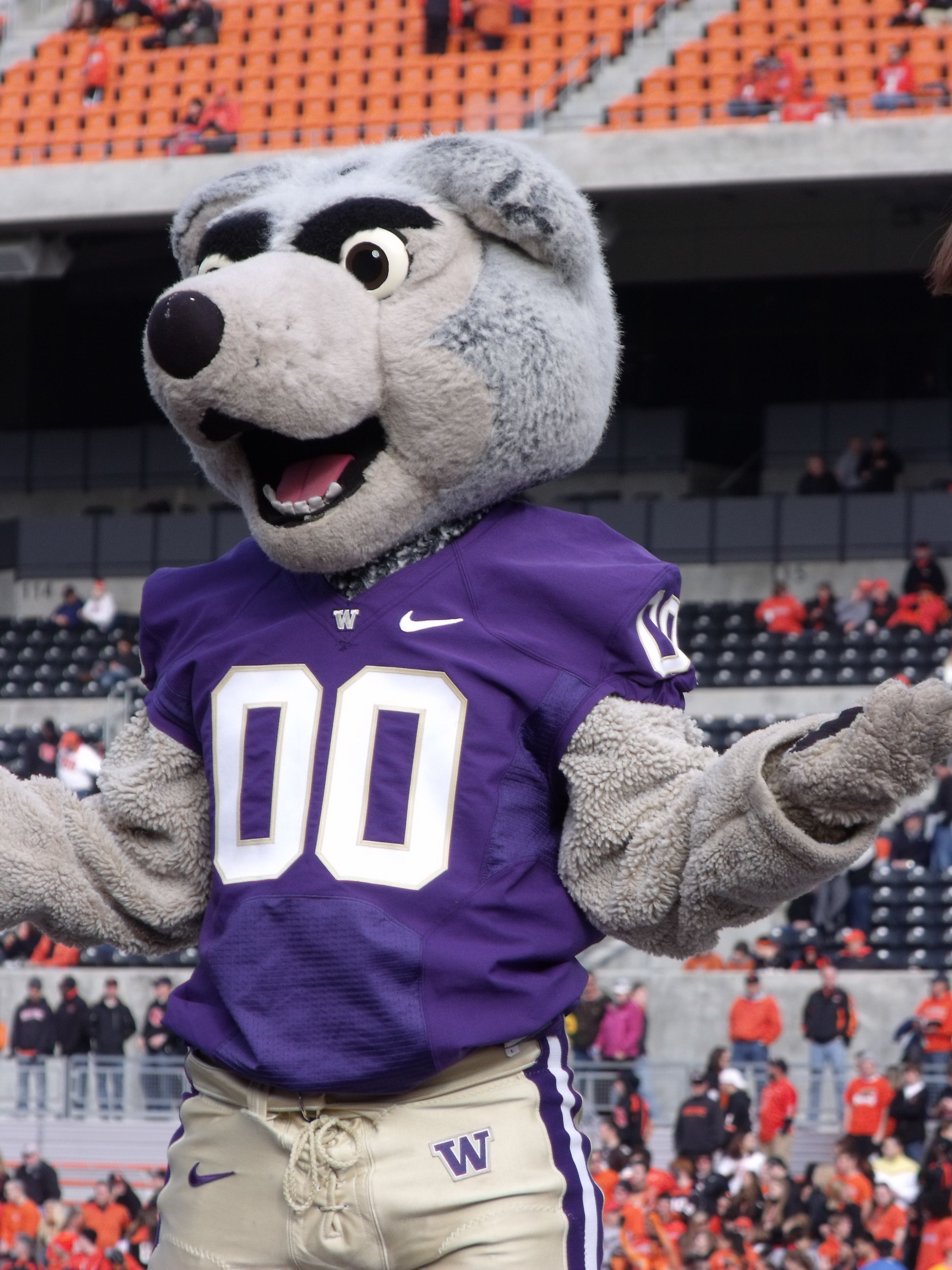
The old variation of Harry the Husky, in use from 1995-2010

Harry the Husky was the brainchild of Band Director Brad McDavid, former Athletics Director Barbara Hedges and the Husky Fever support group. In 1995, officials in the university's athletic department commissioned a costume and held tryouts for the new mascot. Three student performers were chosen (Lee Harris, Evelyn Ho and Chris MacDonald) and rotated duties to appear as a secondary mascot for use at events at which the live mascot was unable to attend. Harris laid out the privacy rules current mascots uphold—during a student's years as Harry, their true identity remains strictly confidential. Originally called, "The Husky Dawg," in 1997 a contest and public vote gave him the new and official name, "Harry the Husky." Coincidentally, the mascot had already been referred to by that name during a scene in The 6th Man, a film starring Marlon Wayans about the University of Washington basketball team, that had been released prior to the vote. The mascot's jersey number is 00.

In 2010, the university unveiled a new Harry the Husky costume and retired the old one. The new husky made his debut on October 9, 2010 at the home game against the Arizona State Sun Devils. The Huskies would go on to lose that game 14-24.

Harry has been seen at every football game since his inception, and you can frequently run into him at other sporting events on campus such as basketball, volleyball, baseball, softball, and more. He is active in the UW community, and attends student fairs, fundraisers, community events, and several other activities in the greater Seattle area.

== Nationals Placements ==
Harry has participated and placed in the Universal Cheerleaders Association's National Championship for mascots. To qualify for a bid to UCA nationals you need to place in the top 10 of all mascots in your division, and while Harry placed in a range from 11th-18th in previous years, he finally broke through in 2019 to make his first UCA appearance in 2019. His placements are as follows:

- 2019 - 8th place at UCA Mascot Nationals
- 2020 - 3rd place at UCA Mascot Nationals
- 2021 - 4th place at UCA Mascot Nationals
