= Dubs (mascot) =

University of Washington live mascot

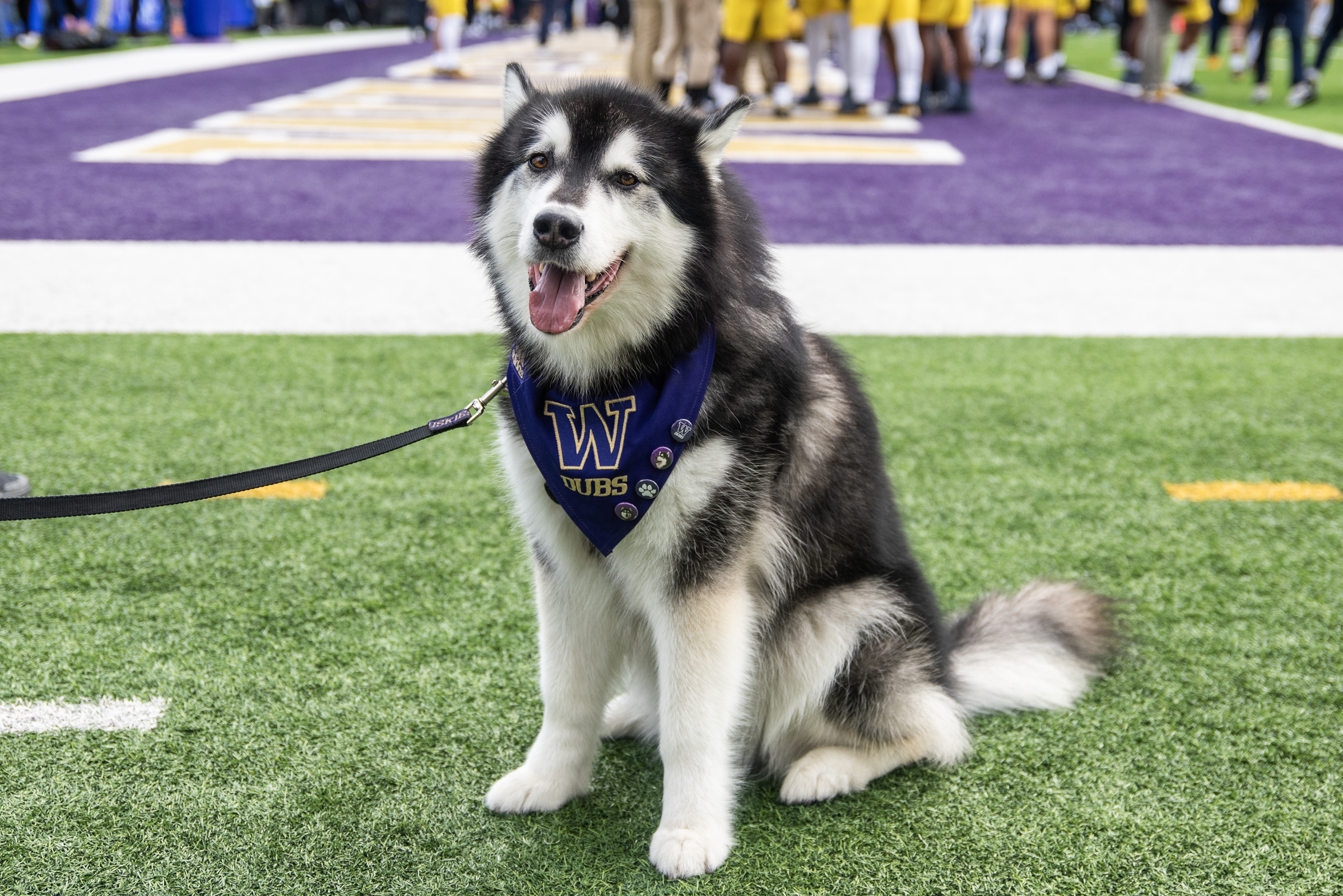
- Dubs in 2024
- University: University of Washington
- Conference: Big Ten
- Description: Alaskan Malamute
- First seen: 2009
- Related mascot(s): Harry the Husky, Sunny Boy
- Website: GoHuskies Dubs

Dubs is the official live mascot of the University of Washington. Since Dubs I's introduction in February 2009, every Dubs has led the football team onto the field during home games. The Huskies use an Alaskan Malamute as their live mascot because it is the "largest and strongest of all Husky breeds."

== Background ==
The Washington Huskies have had 14 live mascots since 1922. The first of the live mascots was Frosty I (1922-30), adopted by the fraternity Sigma Alpha Epsilon. He was followed by Frosty II (1930-36), Wasky I (1946-47), Wasky II (1947-54), Ski (1954-58), Denali (1958), King Chinook (1959-68), Regent Denali (1969-81), Sun dodger Denali (1981-92), King Redoubt (1992-98), Prince Redoubt (1998), and Spirit (1999-2008).

Dubs II is the 14th completely official live mascot of the University of Washington. He is an Alaskan Malamute from Snohomish, Washington. Unlike other animal mascots, such as the University of Georgia's bulldog Uga, each Dubs is from a separate family tree and is not related in order to prevent inbreeding. An exception was made after the sudden passing of the tenth live mascot King Redoubt during a heatwave a month before the 1998 football season, with his son Prince Redoubt succeeding him for the season. When he is working, he has a team of one dog trainer, Anne-Lise Nilsen Knight, and a rotating base of student handlers. The student handlers, led by Knight, are responsible for assisting with fan interactions, keeping him safe, and running out with him to start each of the University of Washington's home football games. In 2024, University Book Store in Seattle launched the Dubs Collection, a line of clothing and accessories based on the beloved school mascot. They did so in collaboration with Knight and her team of handlers.

Historically, the university has also hosted a long line of Alaskan Malamutes as mascots. The dogs were originally cared for by the Sigma Alpha Epsilon fraternity; this arrangement was followed by a 49-year tradition (1959–2008) of care by the Cross family (a UW professor, followed by his son). Dubs is now taken care of by an Alumni family based in Sammamish, Washington. The 14 official live mascots thus far are as follows:

- Frosty I (1922–30)
- Frosty II (1930–36)
- Wasky (1946–47)
- Wasky II (1947–53)
- Ski (1954–57)
- Denali (1958)
- King Chinook (1959–68)
- Regent Denali (1969–80)
- Sundodger Denali (1981–92)
- King Redoubt (1992–97)
- Prince Redoubt (1998)
- Spirit (1999–2008)
- Dubs (2009–2018)
- Dubs II (2018– )

== Dubs namesakes ==
- Dubs I (2009–18) – Started the Dubs mascot line. An Alaskan Malamute from Burlington, Washington. In late September 2008, the University of Washington announced an initiative to search for an appropriate name for its live mascot. A contest was launched online and fans were asked to submit their favorite name for the live Husky dog. More than 1,400 different nominations were received and a committee that consisted of campus and community representatives narrowed the field to a reasonable list of finalists. More than 20,000 votes were received in two rounds of online, with Dubs emerging victorious. In Fall 2018, UW Athletics hosted a “Passing of the Collar” ceremony where the UW president removed the collar from Dubs I and placed it on Dubs II, signifying the official retirement of Dubs I. Dubs I died on April 3, 2021, aged 12.
- Dubs II (2018 – present) – Began training alongside Dubs I during the Fall of 2018, he currently resides in Sammamish, Washington.
