= ASUW Shell House =

Coordinates: 47°38′52″N 122°18′0″W

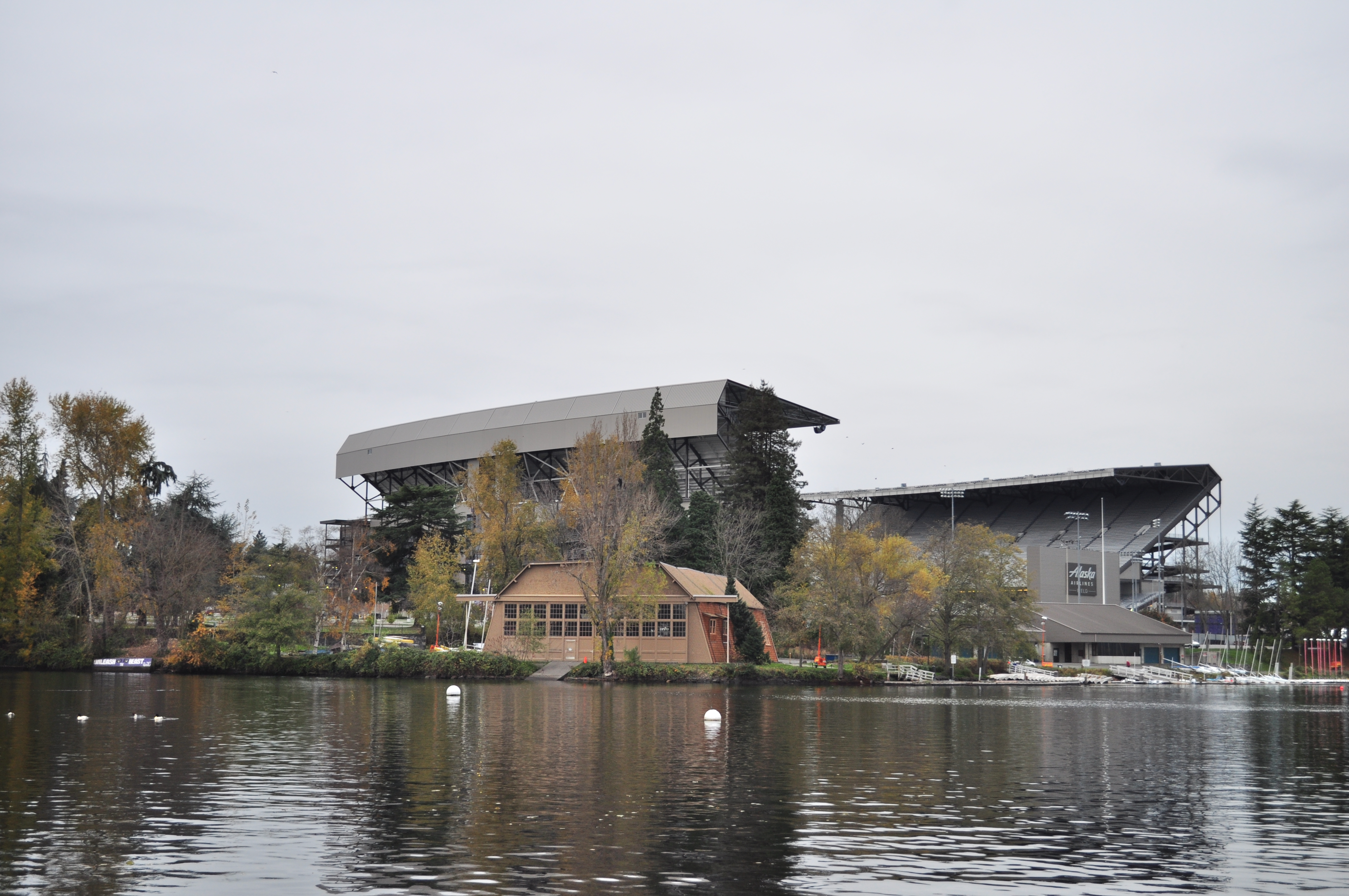
- ASUW Shell House in the foreground of Husky Stadium, looking west from Union Bay
- Interactive map of the ASUW Shell House area
- Alternative names: UW Canoe House

General information
- Location: 3655 Walla Walla Rd, Seattle, Washington 98195
- Owner: University of Washington

The Associated Students of the University of Washington (ASUW) Shell House, also known as the UW Canoe House, is a historic building on the University of Washington campus in Seattle, Washington. The building was constructed in 1918 as a Navy seaplane hangar during World War I. It was later used as a shell house for the University of Washington men's rowing team from 1920 to 1949 and a canoe rental space until 1975. The building is located northeast of the Montlake Cut on Union Bay.

The shell house was home to the famous 1936 Olympic Gold medal-winning UW Men's Rowing team until the rowing program's eventual transfer to the Conibear Shellhouse facility in 1949. It is listed on the National Register of Historic Places.

In 2018, UW Recreation began campaigning for a $13 million restoration of the old shell house to shed light on its history and enrich the waterfront.

== History ==
The original building was constructed in 1918. After the United States entered World War I in 1917, the University of Washington granted the government access to its campus facilities for U.S. naval training and storage. The Navy hangar was an approximately 10,500 square foot wooden structure. However, the building's naval use was rather short-lived due to the end of the war that year, and the Navy gave ownership of the hangar to the University.

Rather than demolishing the hangar, the University chose to repurpose the building as the ASUW Shell House. The Shell House's convenient waterfront location was perfect for storing and transporting the crew team's rowing shells to both competition and practice on Lake Washington.

The Shell House was also partially transformed into a workshop for George Yeoman Pocock, the renowned boatbuilder who previously built pontoons for the Boeing company. Pocock constructed racing shells at this location until 1949. His designs were commissioned by university crew teams across the nation.

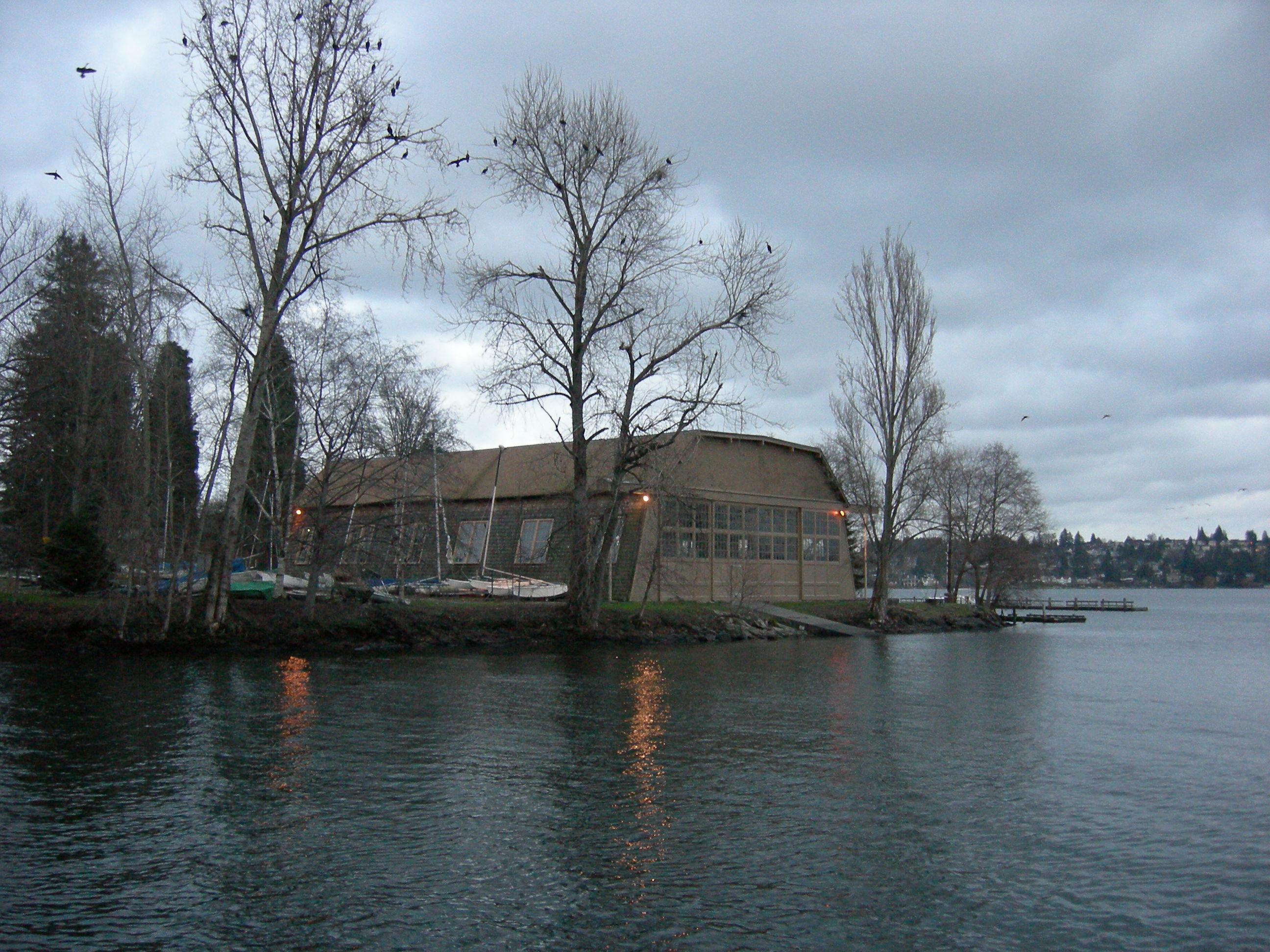
View from the Montlake Cut

The UW men's varsity eight won the gold medal at the 1936 Summer Olympics in Berlin. This feat is further detailed in Daniel James Brown's novel The Boys in the Boat, which includes information about the team's use of Pocock shells built in the ASUW Shell House.

=== UW Canoe House ===
In 1949, the UW crew team transferred its operations to the newly built Conibear Shellhouse. The ASUW Shell House became the Canoe House after renovations to the interior. George and Cora Leis operated the canoe rental space until 1956; it remained a rental option for UW affiliates until 1972.

The Washington Yacht Club, UW's Student-run Sailing Club, was established in 1948 and has used part of the Shell House as a storage space for the last 73 years.

In 1958, the Lake Washington Rowing Club began using the Canoe House to store its boats. Six years later, George Pocock relocated his business off campus, and in 1969, the newly revived UW women's rowing program took over the Shell House.

In 2018, the ASUW Shell House was designated as a landmark by Seattle's Landmarks Preservation Board. It was also listed on the National Register of Historic Places in 1975. It was the first Seattle Landmark on the University of Washington Campus.

After canoe rentals transferred to the Waterfront Activities Center in 1976, the building was left dormant and unused. It wasn't until the release of The Boys in the Boat and a campaign by the University's Recreation department in 2018 that the Shell House became recognized by the public for its rich history. UW currently offers "Boys of '36" tours of both the ASUW Shell House and the Conibear Shellhouse.

The University set in motion its efforts to renovate the ASUW Shell House by 2021 and "bring long overdue attention to [the] entire waterfront."
