= Sunny Boy (mascot) =

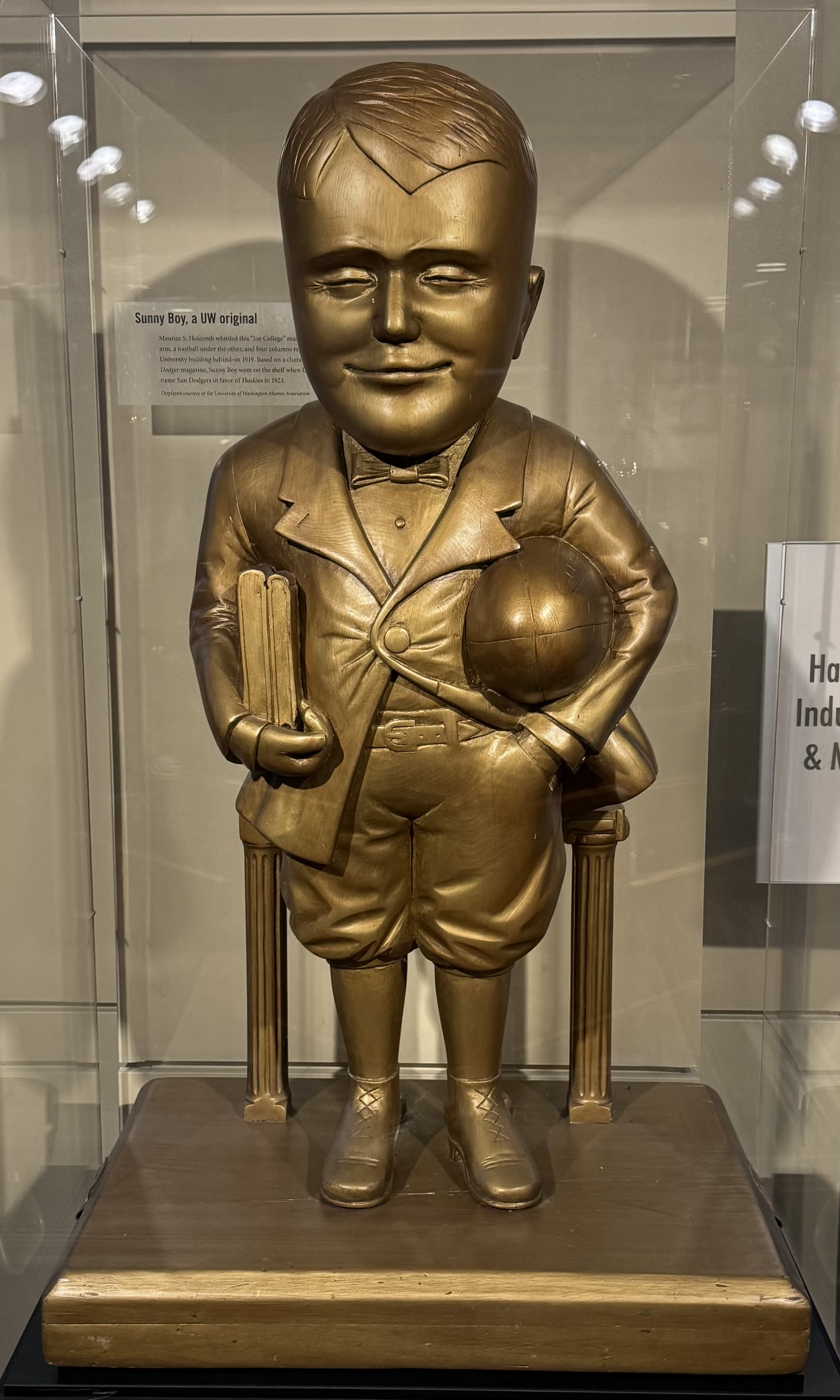
- Sunny Boy figure at the Husky Hall of Fame at Hec Edmundson Pavilion
- Team: Sun Dodgers
- University: University of Washington
- Conference: Pacific Coast Conference
- Origin of name: Sun Dodger
- First seen: 1920
- Related mascot(s): Dubs, Harry the Husky

Sunny Boy is a wooden statue of an undergraduate that served as the mascot of the University of Washington Sun Dodgers.
