= Sylvan theater =

Outdoor theatre

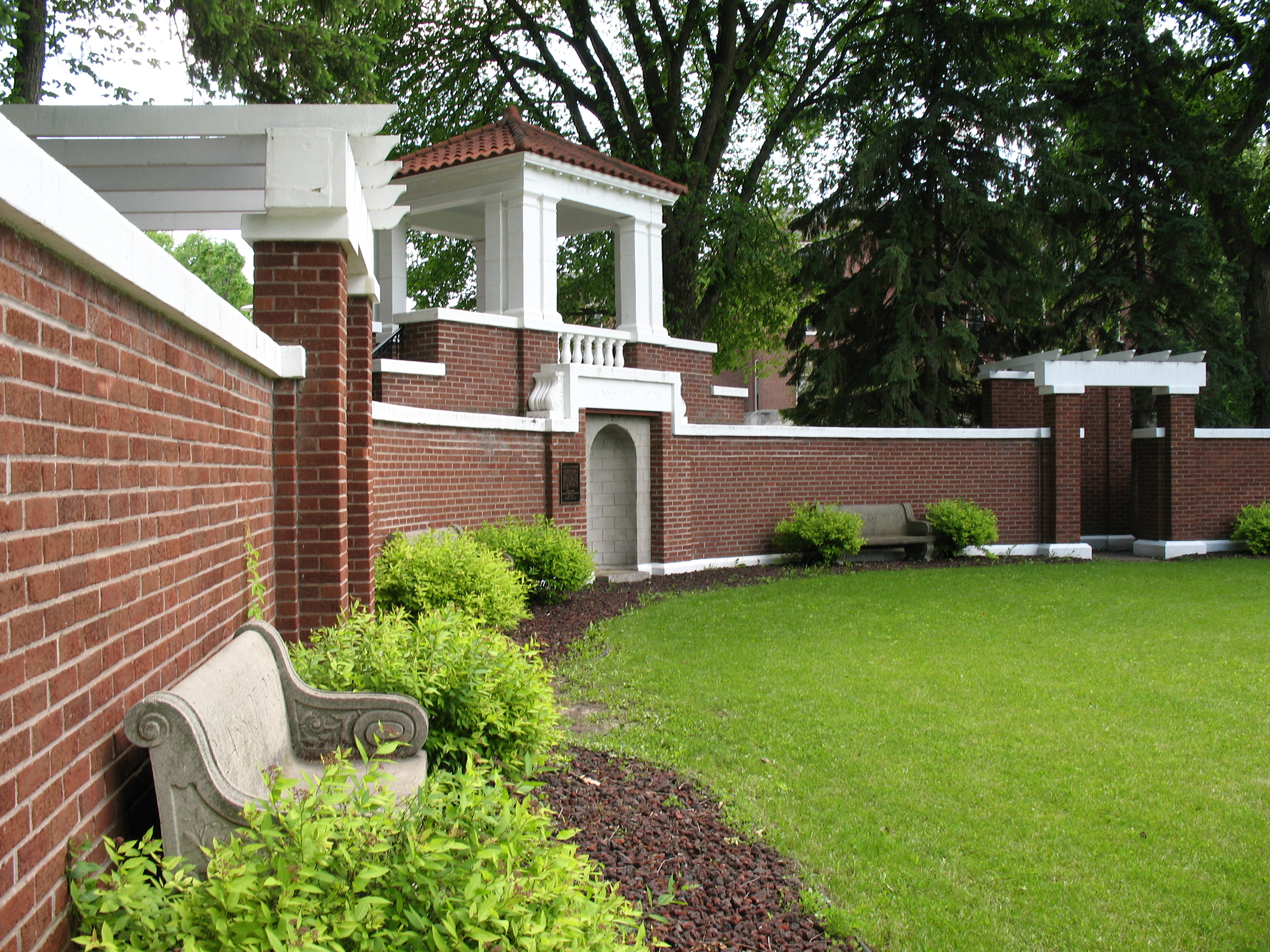
Sylvan Theater on the Sylvan Green, South Dakota State University, Brookings, South Dakota, US

A sylvan theater—sometimes called a greenery theater (French: théâtre de verdure) (also spelt theatre, see spelling differences)—is a type of outdoor theater situated in a wooded (sylvan) setting. Often adorned with classical motifs (columns, statues), a sylvan theater may substitute a simple green lawn for built seating and can include elaborate arrangements of shrubs, flowers and other greenery. These alfresco stages may be features of grand formal gardens or parks, or of more intimate settings, and may be intended for either public or private use.

== History of sylvan theaters ==
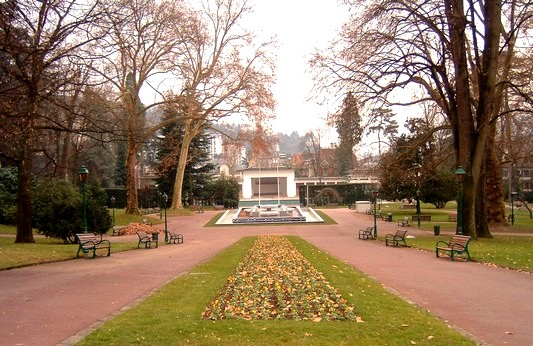
Parc floral des Thermes, Aix-les-Bains, France

A notable early example of a sylvan theater was the Bosquet du Théâtre d'Eau ("Water Theater Grove")—one of the 14 celebrated bosquet ("groves") in the Gardens of the Palace of Versailles near Paris. The central feature of this bosquet, which was designed for King Louis XIV by Le Nôtre between 1671 and 1674, was an auditorium-like theater sided by three tiers of turf seating that faced a stage decorated with four fountains alternating with three radiating cascades. As part of the replantation of the gardens ordered by King Louis XVI during the winter of 1774–75, the Bosquet du Théâtre d’Eau was destroyed and replaced with an unadorned garden. (As of 2009, the Bosquet du Théâtre d’Eau is currently being rebuilt.)

== Notable sylvan theaters ==
=== Europe ===
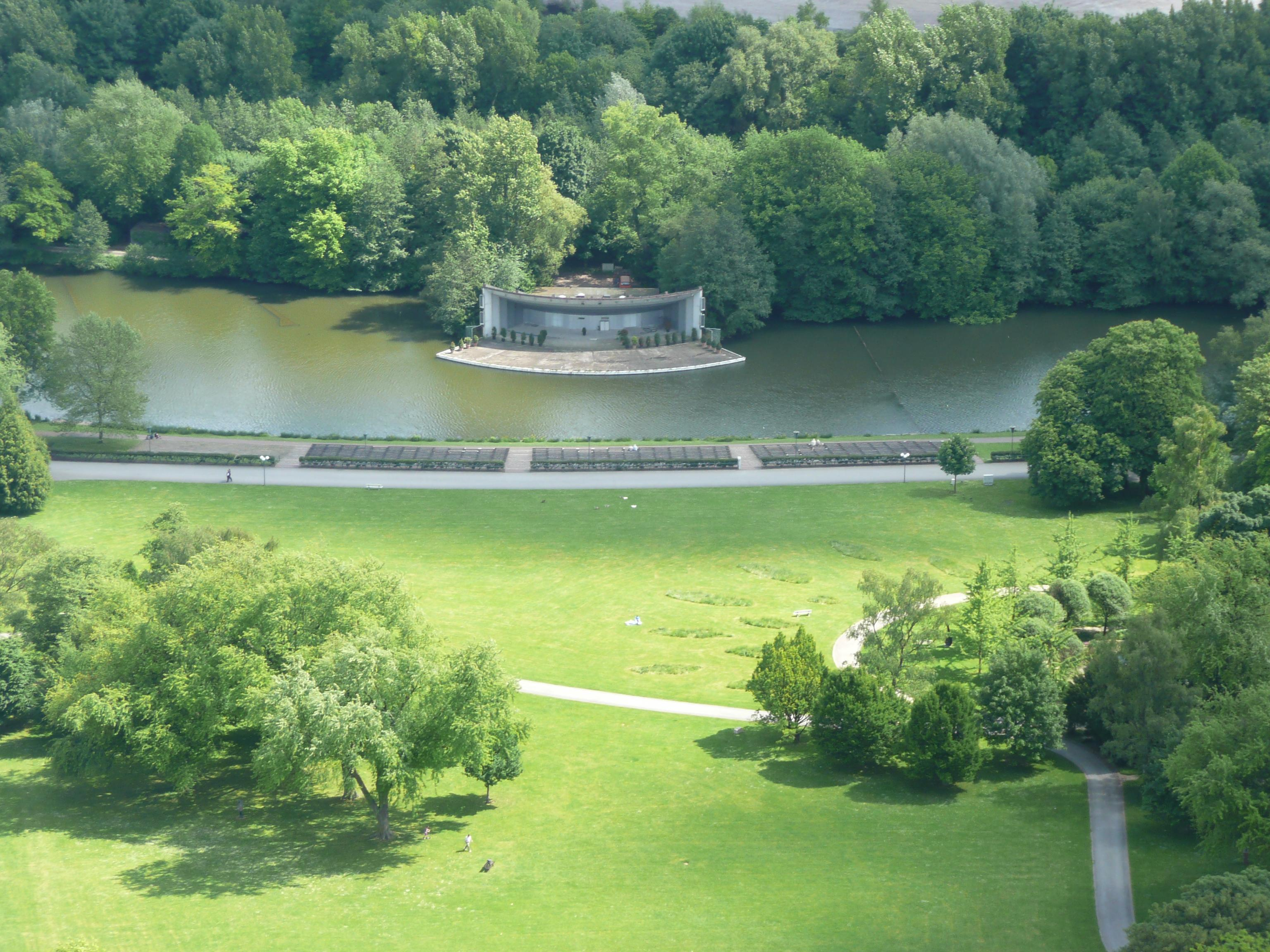
Westfalenpark in Dortmund

- Bosquet du Théâtre d'Eau ("Water Theater Grove"), Versailles, France (1671–1674)
- The Sylvan Theater, Killruddery House and Gardens, Bray, County Wicklow, Ireland.
  - Sir Walter Scott, during a stay at Killruddery, was inspired by the idea of the sylvan theatre, including it in his novel St. Ronan's Well (1824).
- Heckentheater ("hedge theater"), Herrenhausen, Germany
- Sylvan Theater, Schwetzingen Castle, Germany
- Ruinentheater ("ruined theater"), Sanspareil Garden (near Bayreuth), Germany
- Théâtre Silvain, Vallon de la Fausse-Monnaie, Marseille, France (1923)
- Parc floral des Thermes, Aix-les-Bains, France

=== North America ===
- The National Sylvan Theater, National Mall, Washington, DC, US (1917)
- Sylvan Grove Theater and Columns, University of Washington, Seattle, Washington, US
- Sylvan Theater, Yosemite National Park, California, US
- Sylvan Theater, Greenwood Park, Des Moines, Iowa, US
- Forest Theater, Carmel, California, US
- The Sinsheimer-Stanley Festival Glen at Shakespeare Santa Cruz, Santa Cruz, California, US
- The Garden Theater at Villa Montalvo, Saratoga, California, US
