= Sylvan Theater Historic District =

Historic district in Iowa, United States

- U.S. National Register of Historic Places
- U.S. Historic district
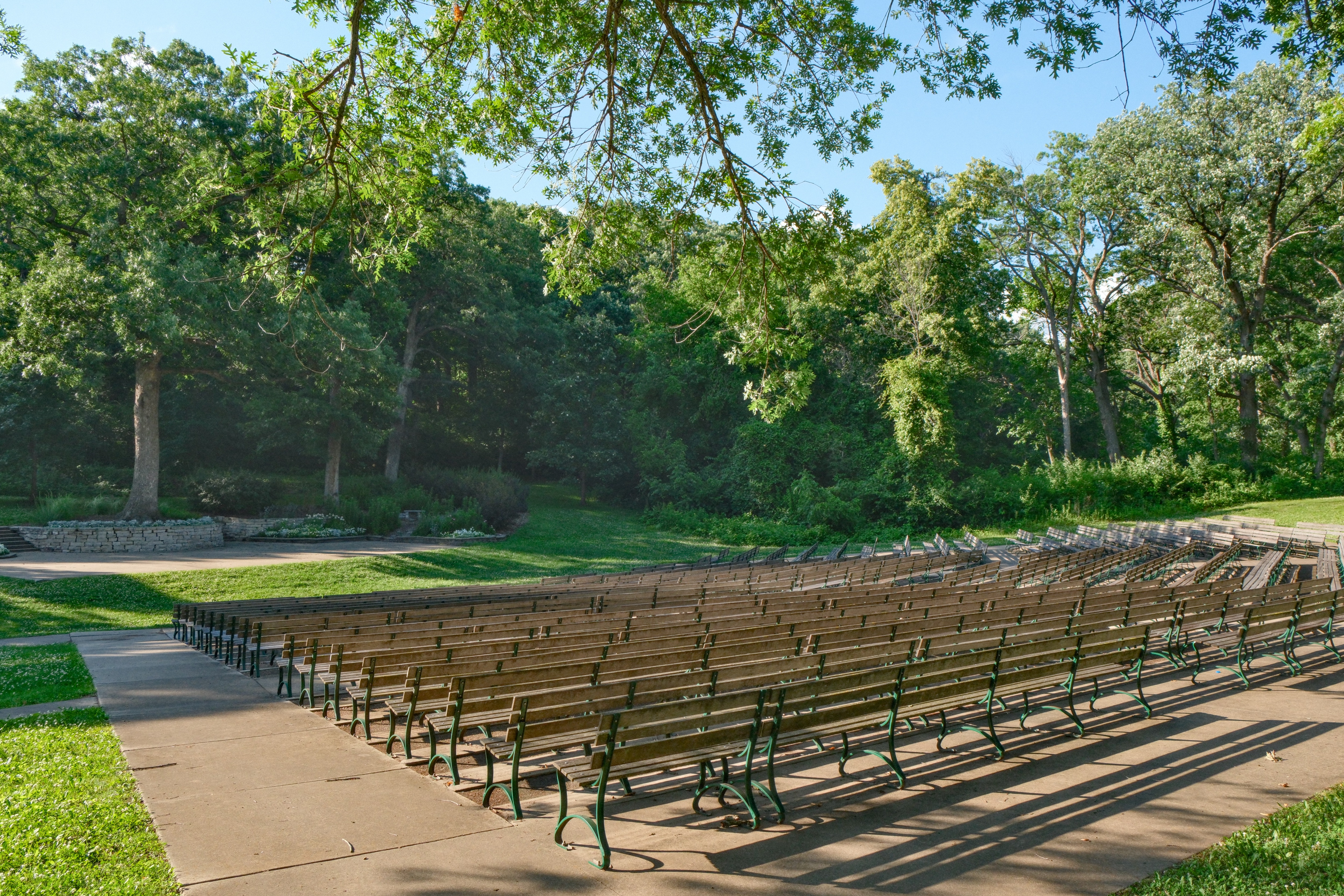
- Sylvan Theater

- Location within Iowa Location within the United States
- Location: In Greenwood Park on the western side of 45th St., 1 block south of its junction with Grand Ave. Des Moines, Iowa
- Coordinates: 41°34′50″N 93°40′48″W
- Area: 4 acres (1.6 ha)
- Architect: Francis Asbury Robinson; Harland Bartholomew Associates
- NRHP reference No.: 95000965
- Added to NRHP: August 15, 1995

The Sylvan Theater Historic District, also known as Greenwood Park Outdoor Theater, is located in Des Moines, Iowa, United States. It has been listed on the National Register of Historic Places since 1995.

== History ==
Outdoor locations for pageants and festivals grew in popularity on college campuses in the United States during the 1910s and 1920s. An outdoor amphitheater was also built in Forest Park in St. Louis, Missouri during this same time. The plan for a sylvan theater in Des Moines was derived from plans prepared by city planners from St. Louis: Harland Bartholomew Associates. They created a comprehensive plan for the city's park system in 1927. The Des Moines Garden Club had C.A Baughman from the same firm draw up detailed plans for Greenwood Park. Included in the new land uses for the park were the plans for a sylvan theater on the eastern edge of the park. It was modeled after the theater in Forest Park.

There was a natural bowl where the outdoor theater would be located along 45th Street. The seats for the audience faced west, the stage was located near the foot of a swale and a hill with trees would provide a natural backdrop. Des Moines landscape architect Francis Asbury Robinson finalized the details and the theater was constructed in 1931. The master plan was to be carried out in two phases. The first phase called for seating to be constructed in the "lower portion" near the stage. An "upper portion" for seating would be built in stage two and has never been built. A reflecting pool was built between the seating area and the stage. A dressing room was constructed to the southwest of the stage. Initially, the seating was composed of wood benches with backs. They were replaced in 1934 with benches made of wood slats with a back that were mounted in wrought iron frames. The new benches were bolted to concrete blocks set in the ground. Funds for the new benches were provided by the Works Progress Administration. There was also a small frame structure in the back of the seating area that was used as a projection booth for films. It was not part of the original designs for the theater and it was last known to exists in 1955.

The first production in the theater was called Nights of Romance and it was held on June 26, 1931. It ran for three nights. The first community sing took place in July 1931 with an audience of 1,000 people. It was directed by Assistant County Attorney Ray Harrison. Such productions, which were free, were popular during the Great Depression. The Community Drama Association managed the theater for several years. The Des Moines Civic Opera Association presented the operetta The Flower of Venice in 1937. It attracted an audience of 8,000 people. There was a decline in productions during World War II. The years after the war saw the movement from the city to the suburbs and the rise of television as a form of entertainment. In the 1980s drug dealers and other elements became a problem; however a variety of events were still held at the theater. Several productions titled Shakespeare on the Loose were held in the 1980s. The first three rows of seating were removed in 1989 because the reflecting pool silted in and the elevation of the land around it was raised. The Iowa Shakespeare Project was established in 1993 and has used the theater for their productions.

== Contributing Elements ==
The Sylvan Theater Historic District is composed of three contributing elements. The first element is the natural amphitheater area, which is considered a site. The theater is a natural land element formed by the slopes of a hill on either side of a creek. It is surrounded by mature oak trees that predate the theater.

The second element is the theater proper, which includes the stage, seating, spectator circulation network, lighting, and entrance steps. It is considered a structure. The stage is made of poured concrete. It measures 30 feet (9 m) deep and 60 feet (18 m) across the back. The front of the stage is rounded and measures 101 feet (31 m). The seating is in four wedge shaped areas that fan out before the stage. The front of each wedge is 30 feet (9 m) in the front, 45 feet (14 m) in the back and 70 feet (21 m) along the sides. The spectator circulation network is composed of a series of aisles that flank the four seating sections. They facilitate the movement of the patrons. The central aisle leads from the entrance on 45th Street to the front of the theater. There are two side aisles that flank the central aisle. The central aisle is about 10 feet (3 m) wide and the side aisles are about 5 feet (2 m) wide. The aisles are composed of earth and grass. The theater is lit by flood lights on two poles. The original outlets on the stage were silted in. The entrance steps are on 45th Street and lead down to the seating area. The eleven steps are 6 feet (2 m) across and have simple iron pipe handrails. Francis Asbury Robinson's master plan was also followed to a large extent with shrubbery.

The third element is the dressing room, which is a building. It is about 30 feet (9 m) behind the stage. The one room, frame building was constructed on a slab that measures 16 feet (5 m) by 20 feet (6 m). There is a concrete gutter on the ground that surrounds the building and directs rain water down the hill. A concrete path leads from the dressing room to the stage. It is hidden from the audience by shrubbery.
