= Conibear Shellhouse =

Rowing facility at the University of Washington

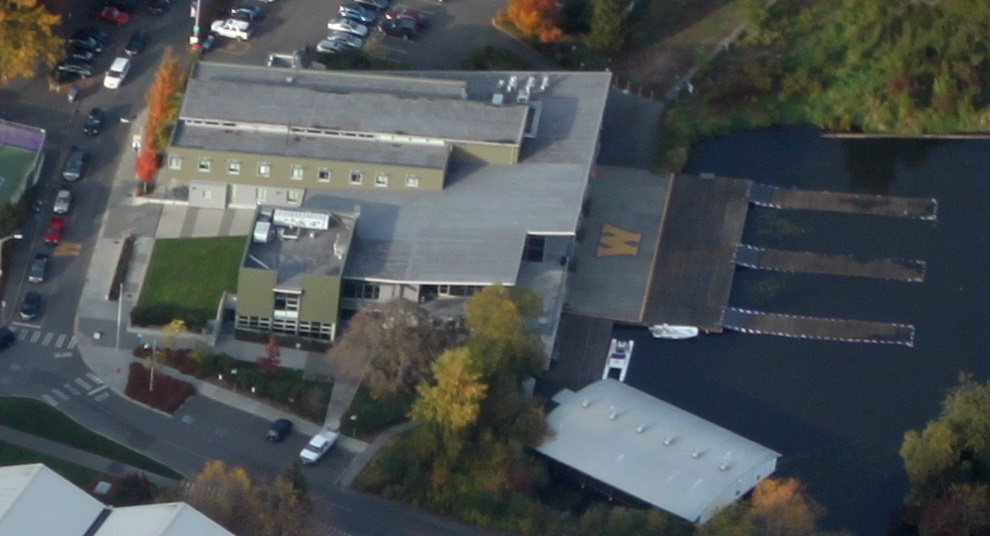
- Conibear Shellhouse on Lake Washington
- Interactive map of the Conibear Shellhouse area

General information
- Status: Completed
- Location: 3896 Walla Walla Road; Seattle, Washington, United States
- Coordinates: 47.6528000°N 122.2998000°W
- Opening: 1949
- Cost: $365,000 (1949) $18.0 million (2005)
- Owner: University of Washington

The Conibear Shellhouse is a rowing training and support facility in Seattle, Washington, on the campus of the University of Washington. It is used by the men's and women's rowing teams of the Washington Huskies. The building was completed in 1949 and renovated in 2005. It is located on Lake Washington, near the Lake Washington Ship Canal.

The facility is named after former coach Hiram Boardman Conibear.

The Conibear Shellhouse was built to replace the old Shell House, now known as the Canoe House, which is further south along the lake shore. The original Shell House was an old seaplane hangar that was turned over to the University of Washington after World War I.

== See also ==
- The Boys in the Boat
- ASUW Shell House
