= California–Washington Dual Regatta =

Annual rowing race between the University of California and University of Washington

- Contested by
California	Washington

The California–Washington Dual Regatta, also known simply as The Dual, is an annual series of rowing races between the crews of the University of California and the University of Washington.
