= Sylvan Grove Theater and Columns =

Coordinates: 47.6527°N 122.3061°W

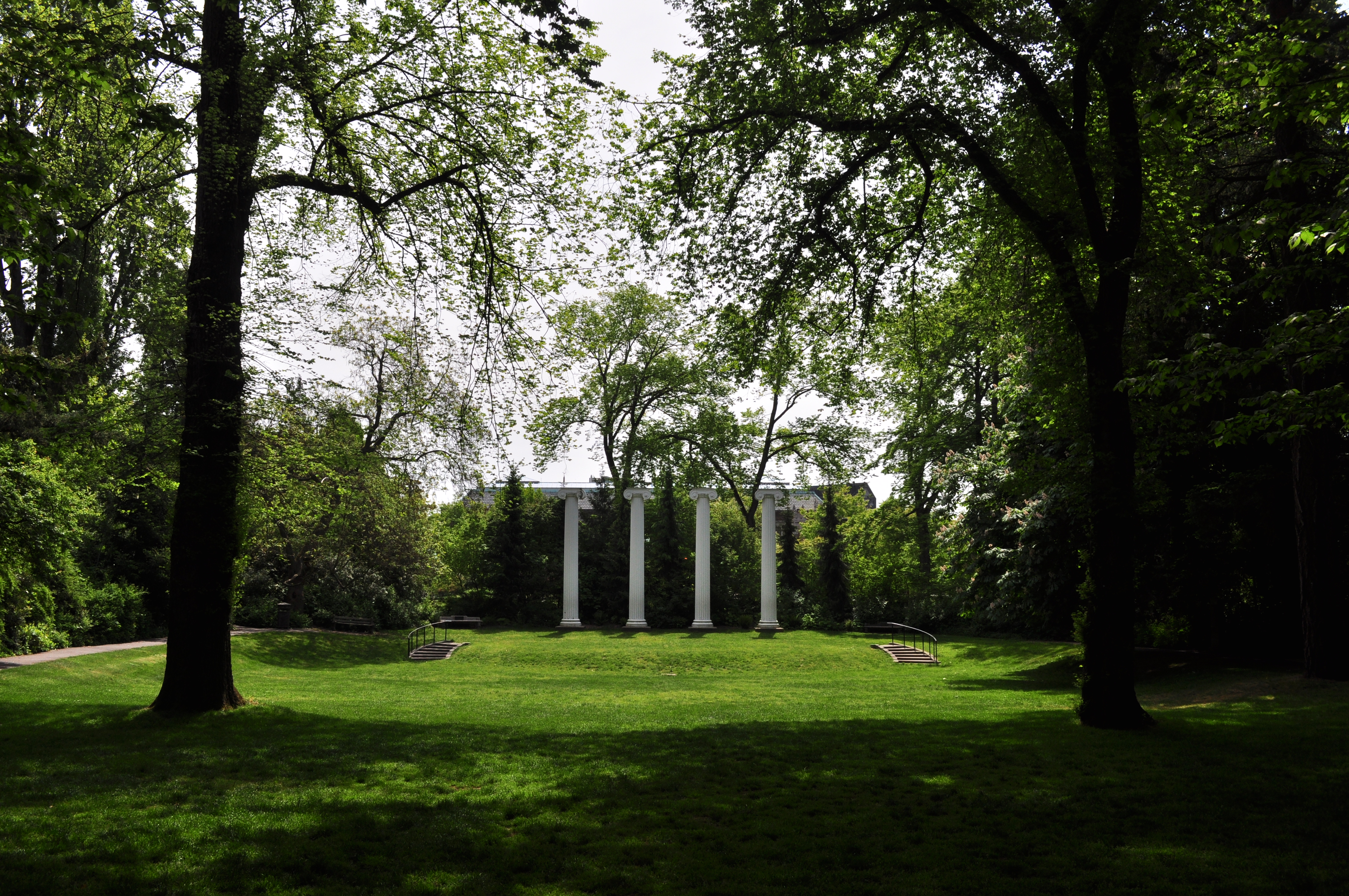
The Sylvan Grove Theater, with the columns in the background.

The Sylvan Grove Theater and Columns, also known as the Sylvan Grove Theater or simply the Sylvan Theater, is a sylvan theater located on the University of Washington campus in Seattle, Washington. Within the theater are four 24 foot (7.3 m) tall Ionic columns from the original University building downtown, constructed in 1861. They are some of the oldest-standing architectural pieces in Seattle. It has been called "one of the most beautiful places on campus."

The columns were named "Loyalty", "Industry", "Faith", and "Efficiency" (LIFE) by University Comptroller Herbert T. Condon and Edmond S. Meany, head of the History Department.

== History ==
The original University of Washington building in downtown Seattle officially opened on September 16, 1861. It had a portico with four Ionic columns made of hand-fluted cedar. In 1908, as the building was about to be demolished, Edmond S. Meany saved the columns, intending that they should be used in the construction of the new campus.

From 1911 through 1920, the columns stood in the Quad, near Savery, Denny, and Raitt Halls. Eventually it became clear that the Greek columns could not be integrated into the University design plan, which specified Gothic architecture for the buildings on upper campus. A student design competition was organized and was won by a sophomore, Marshall W. Gill, the son of Seattle Mayor Hiram Gill.

In 1921, the columns were moved to their current location in Sylvan Grove. They are maintained by the university's Facility Services, which last repaired them in 2008.

The site has received attention from paranormal investigators.

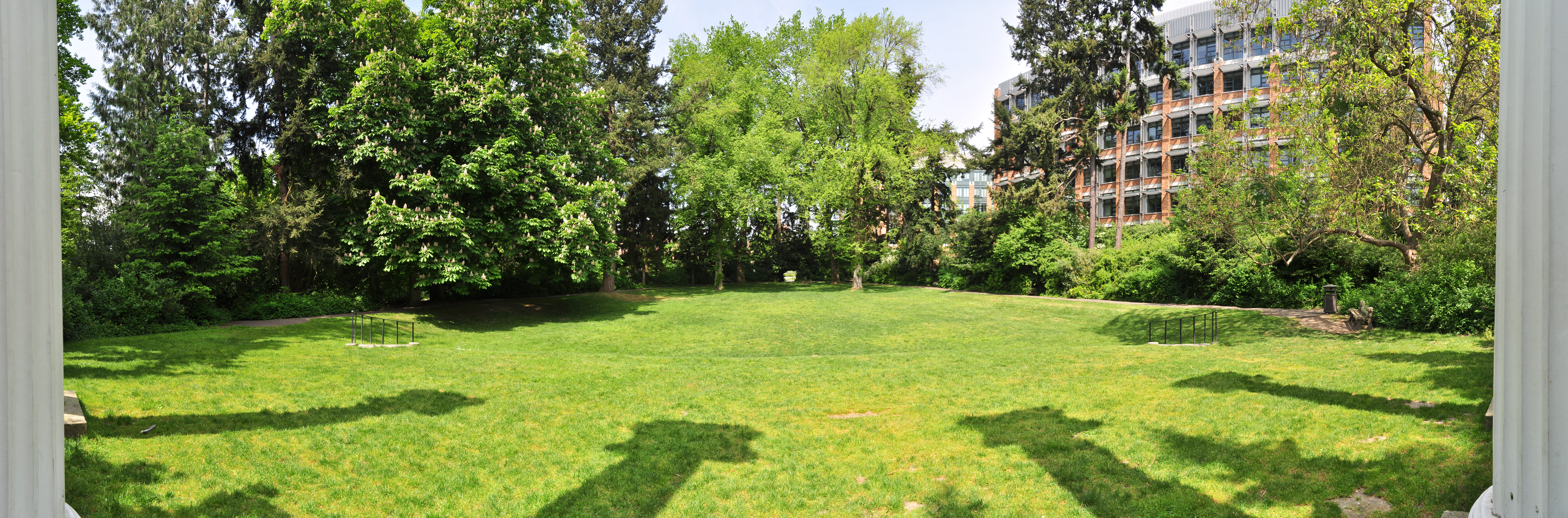
A roughly 175° panoramic view of the Sylvan Grove Theater from the stage. Columns can be seen at either side.
