= Tennessee Volunteers women's rowing =

- University: University of Tennessee
- Athletic director: Danny White
- Head coach: Kim Cupini (1st season)
- Conference: SEC
- Location: Knoxville, Tennessee, US
- Facility: Tennessee Boat House
- Area of Practice: Tennessee River
- Nickname: Lady Volunteers
- Colors: Orange, white, and smokey gray

NCAA Championship appearances
- 1997, 2003, 2004, 2005, 2006, 2007, 2008, 2010, 2021, 2024, 2025

Conference championships
- CUSA: 2010, 2012; SEC: 2026

The Tennessee Volunteers women's rowing team is the most recently added sport at the University of Tennessee (UT). The team began in 1995. From 2014 through 2024, the team competed in the Big 12 Conference, which took over the rowing league formerly operated by Conference USA. UT is joined in Big 12 rowing by one of its historic rivals in its all-sports league, the Southeastern Conference, in Alabama. The Volunteers, then known as Lady Volunteers, won their first conference championship in 2010.

Along with other UT women's sports teams, it used the nickname "Lady Volunteers" (or the short form "Lady Vols") until the 2015–16 school year, when the school dropped the "Lady" prefix from the nicknames of all women's teams except in basketball. In 2017 the “Lady Vol” name was reinstated.

== Overview ==
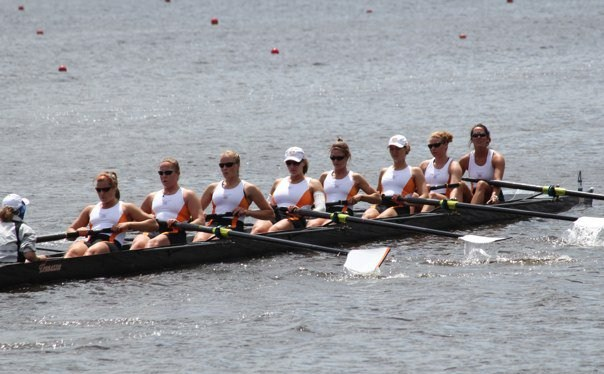
Volunteers rowing in the Tennessee River

During former head coach Lisa Glenn's 19-year stint at UT, she helped guide the 22-year program to seven appearances at the NCAA Rowing Championships, including three consecutive full-team selections in 2006, 2007, and 2008. In the 2010 season, Glenn led the Lady Vols to its first-ever Conference-USA ("C-USA") rowing championship. Glenn was also named C-USA Coach of the Year for her efforts in steering the Lady Vols. Under Glenn's guidance, senior Laura Miller was named the C-USA rower of the year, while three other Lady Vols captured All-Conference honors.

Glenn maintained a strong track record of producing stellar student-athletes. Five Lady Vols have taken home All-America accolades. Former rower Erin-Monique Shelton garnered second-team honors for the third consecutive year in 2008, joining Chelsea Pemberton as the only Tennessee rowers to earn All-America honors three times in a row.

For the first time in Tennessee history, Head Coach Lisa Glenn guided one of her shells to the grand finals at the NCAA Championship, and the team’s third consecutive full-team appearance at the event. The fifth-place showing by the 2V8+ in the grand final was the programs best finish.

== Tennessee Boathouse ==
When Coach Lisa Glenn arrived at UT she had a vision of a state of the art boat house for the Lady Vols rowing team to call home. Ground work for the Tennessee Boathouse began in September 1999 when the first shovel was driven into the ground on the north side of the Tennessee River. Now over ten years later, she and the team have a place to call home for the newest sports program at Tennessee. The three-story building is the permanent home of the University of Tennessee Lady Volunteer Rowing Team. The facility, located directly across the street from Neyland Stadium on the waterfront, anchors the west end of Knoxville's Volunteer Landing waterfront development and jettisons 40-feet out over the water with balconies overlooking the Tennessee River. The structure stands beside the "Vol Navy" docks. The 180-foot floating dock has enough space to launch three eights at once. The ground level boat bay holds 26 boats including singles, pairs, quads, fours and eights. The Tennessee River can be viewed through windows spanning the entire south wall.

== All-Americans ==
The Tennessee Volunteers rowing team has featured seven USRowing All-Americans/CRCA Pocock All-Americans

- Amy Delashmit - 1997 USRowing All-American
- Kaitlin Bargreen - 2003 CRCA Pocock 1st Team All-American & 2005 CRCA Pocock 2nd Team All-American
- Chelsea Pemberton - 2003, 2005 CRCA Pocock 2nd Team All-American & 2004 CRCA Pocock 1st Team All-American
- Andrea Bagwell - 2005 CRCA Pocock 2nd Team All-American
- Erin-Monique Shelton - 2006, 2007, 2008 CRCA Pocock 2nd Team All-American
- Laura Miller - 2010 CRCA Pocock 2nd Team All-American
- Erika Lauderdale - 2012 CRCA Pocock 2nd Team All-American

== See also ==
- NCAA Rowing Championship
