= 1967 =

1967 in various calendars
- Gregorian calendar: 1967; MCMLXVII
- Ab urbe condita: 2720
- Armenian calendar: 1416; ԹՎ ՌՆԺԶ
- Assyrian calendar: 6717
- Baháʼí calendar: 123–124
- Balinese saka calendar: 1888–1889
- Bengali calendar: 1373–1374
- Berber calendar: 2917
- British Regnal year: 15 Eliz. 2 – 16 Eliz. 2
- Buddhist calendar: 2511
- Burmese calendar: 1329
- Byzantine calendar: 7475–7476
- Chinese calendar: 丙午年 (Fire Horse); 4664 or 4457 — to — 丁未年 (Fire Goat); 4665 or 4458
- Coptic calendar: 1683–1684
- Discordian calendar: 3133
- Ethiopian calendar: 1959–1960
- Hebrew calendar: 5727–5728
- Hindu calendars
- Vikram Samvat: 2023–2024
- Shaka Samvat: 1888–1889
- Kali Yuga: 5067–5068
- Holocene calendar: 11967
- Igbo calendar: 967–968
- Iranian calendar: 1345–1346
- Islamic calendar: 1386–1387
- Japanese calendar: Shōwa 42 (昭和４２年)
- Javanese calendar: 1898–1899
- Juche calendar: 56
- Julian calendar: Gregorian minus 13 days
- Korean calendar: 4300
- Minguo calendar: ROC 56 民國56年
- Nanakshahi calendar: 499
- Thai solar calendar: 2510
- Tibetan calendar: མེ་ཕོ་རྟ་ལོ་ (male Fire-Horse); 2093 or 1712 or 940 — to — མེ་མོ་ལུག་ལོ་ (female Fire-Sheep); 2094 or 1713 or 941

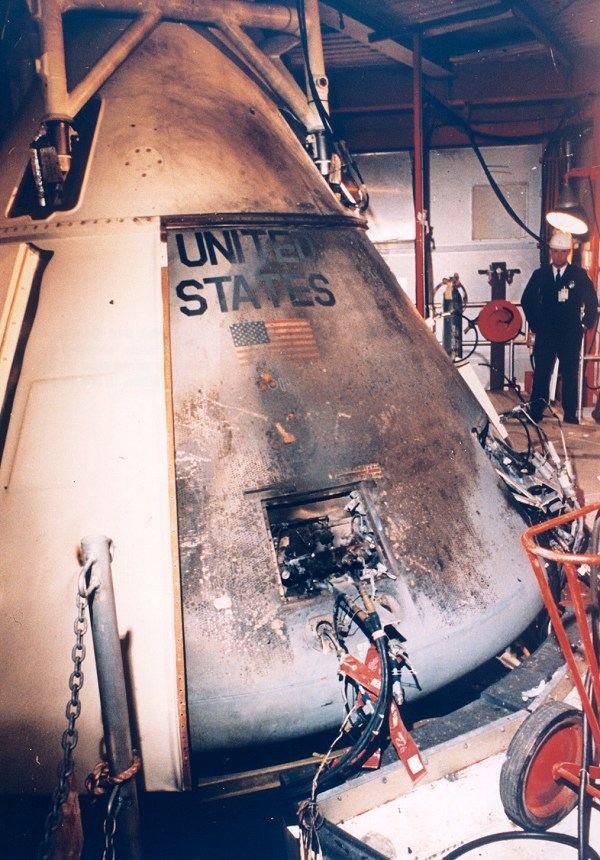
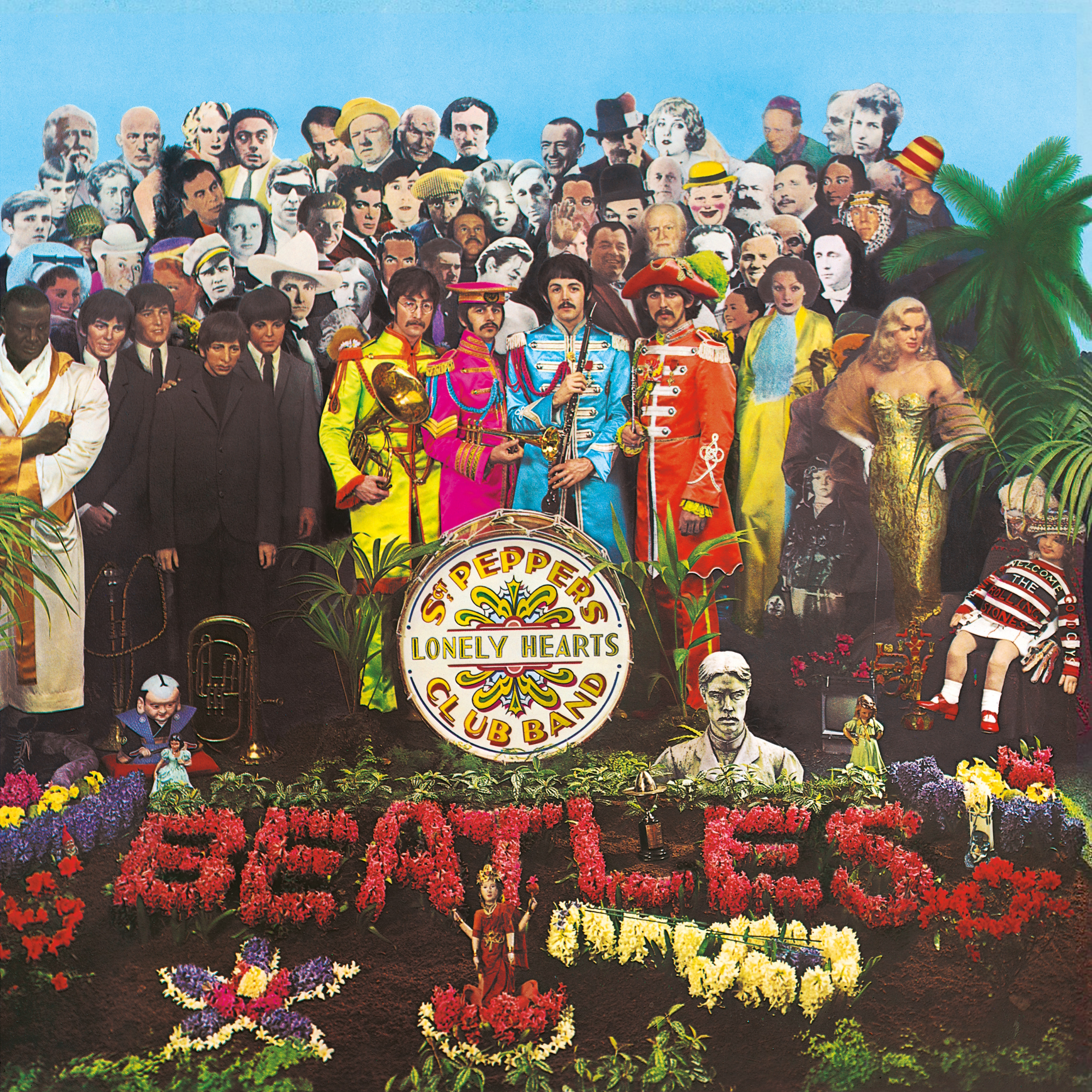
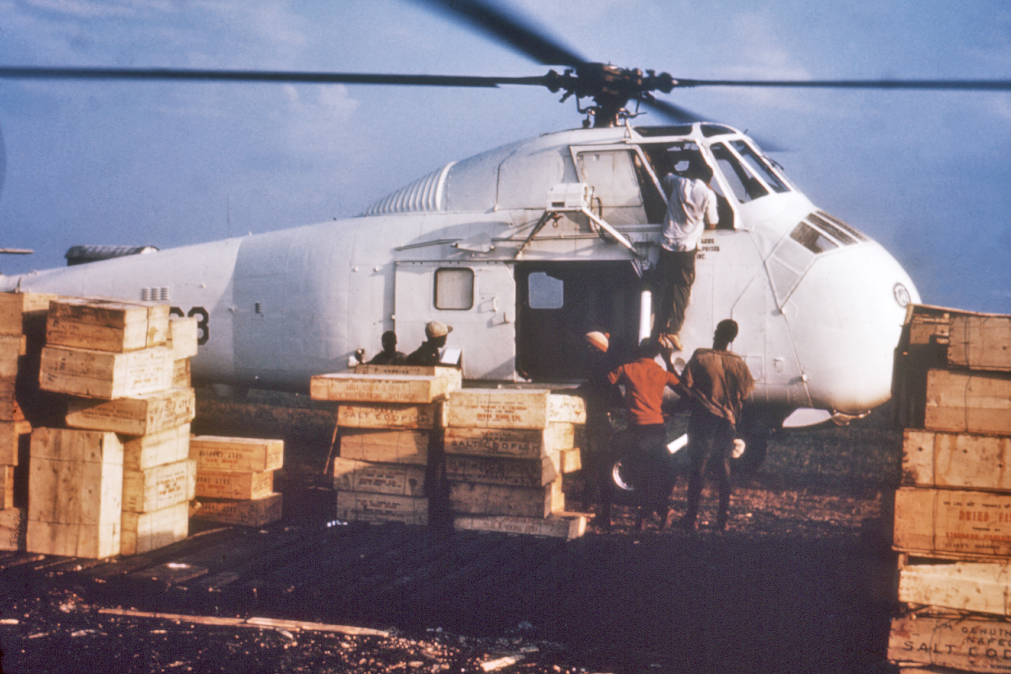
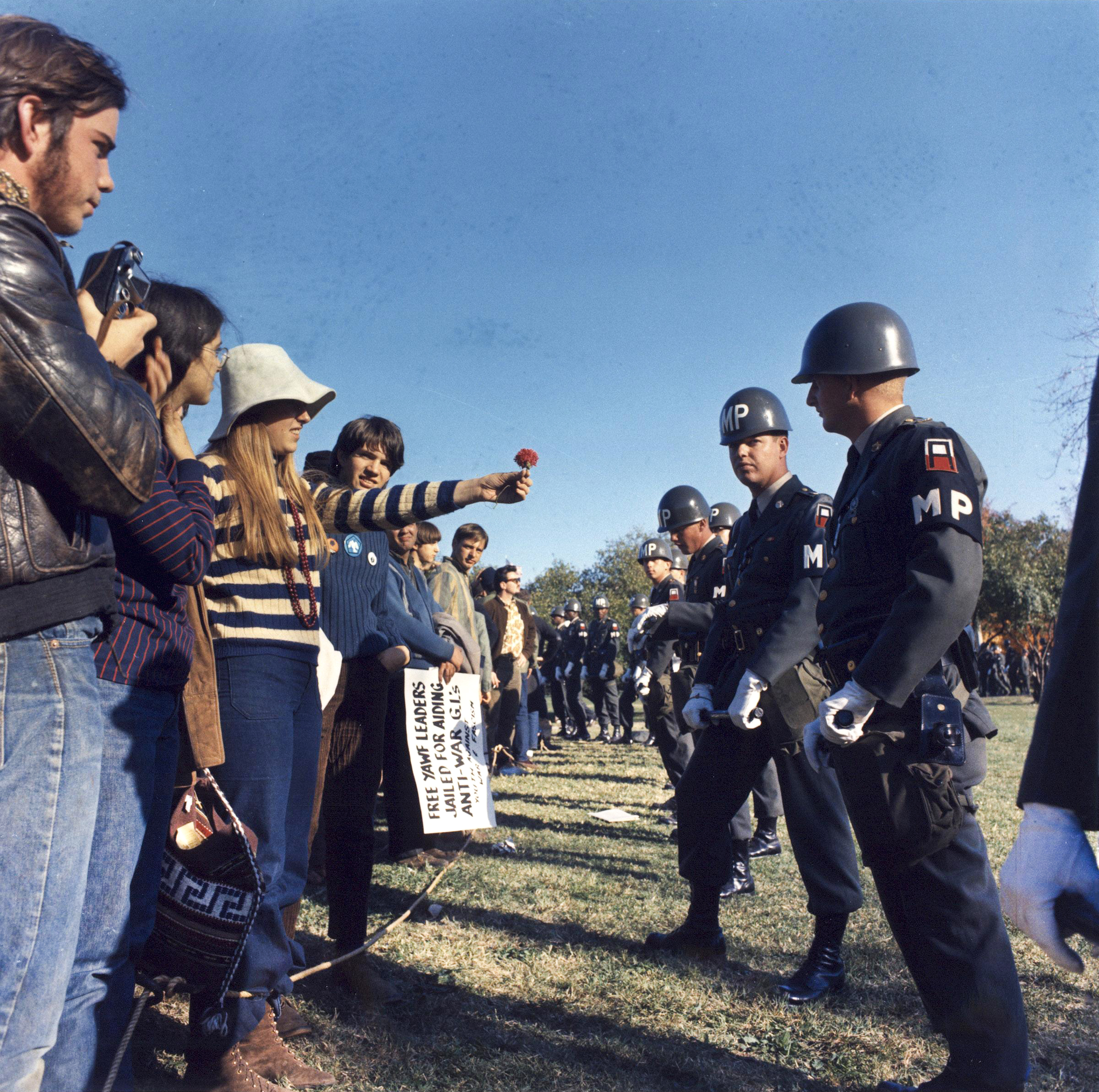
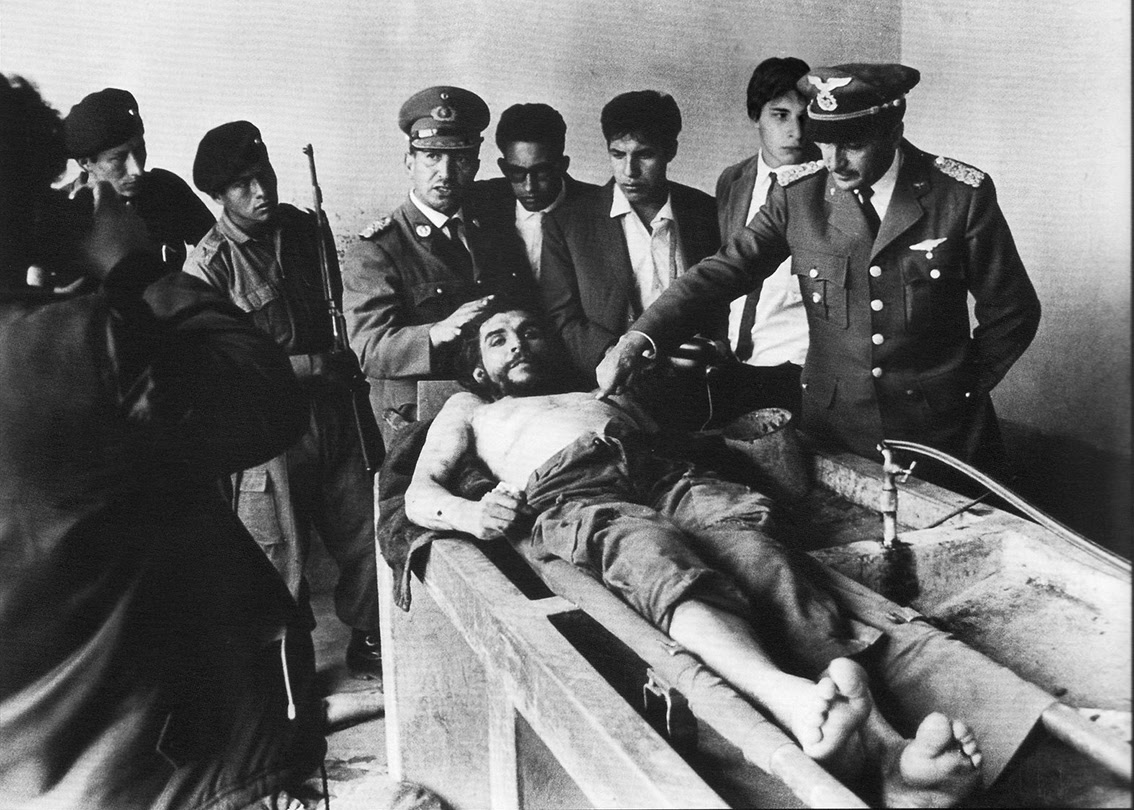
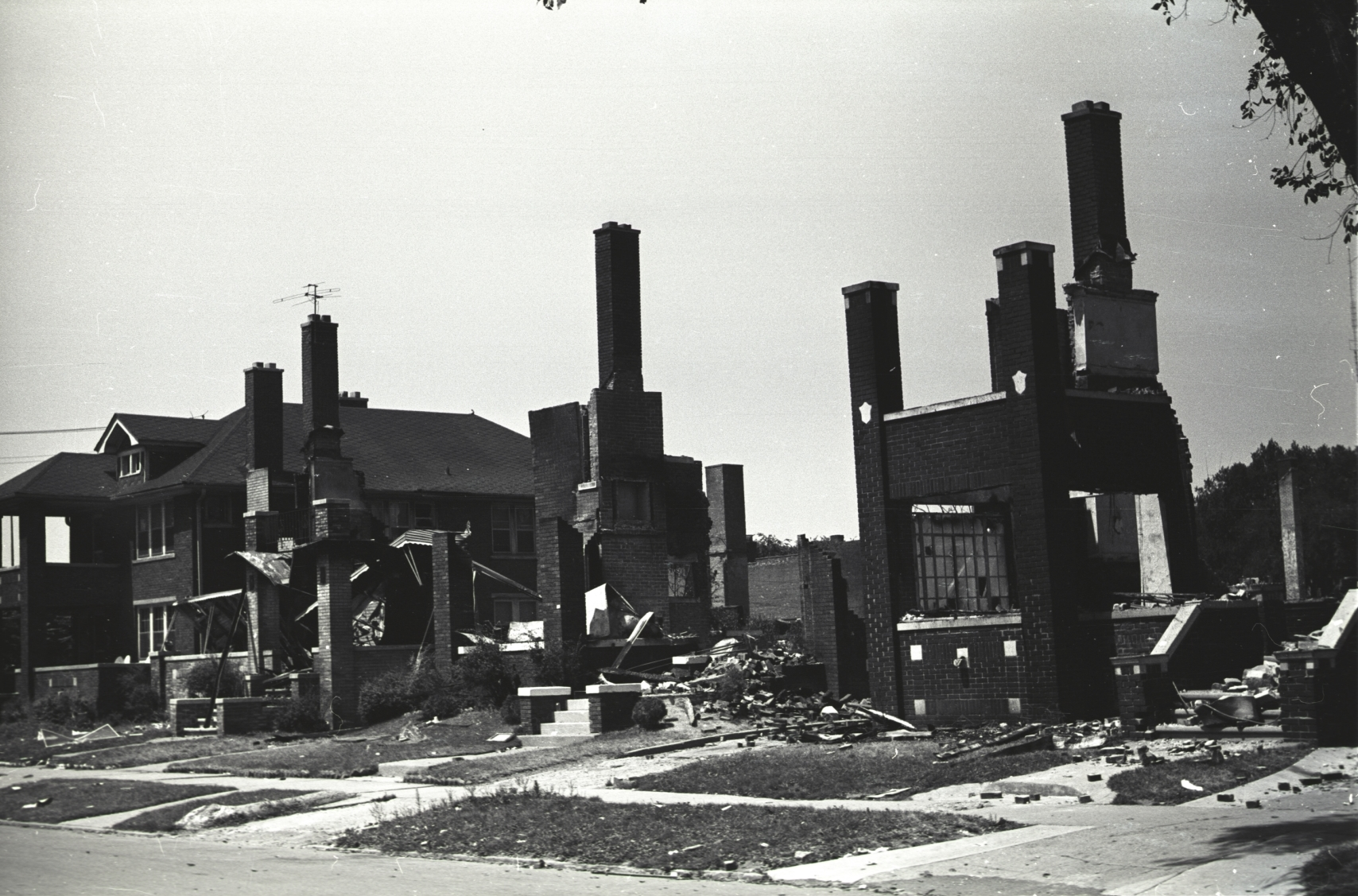
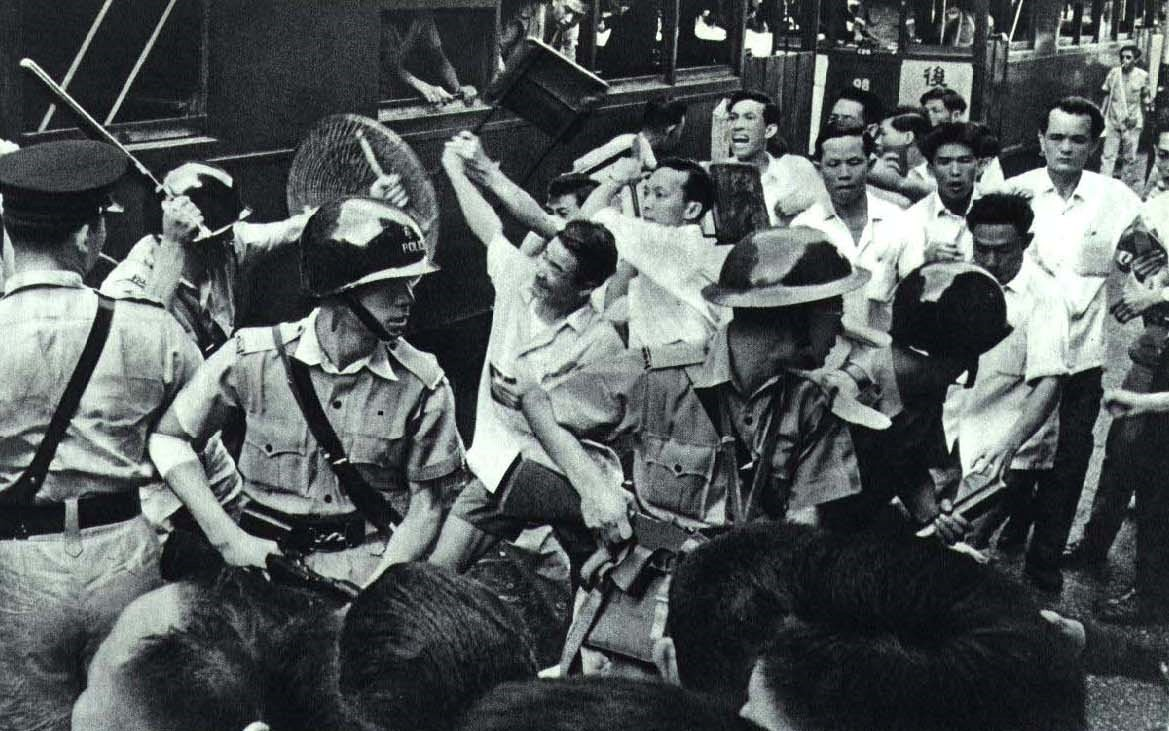
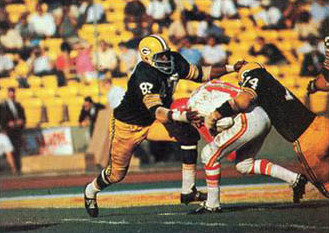
From top to bottom, left to right: the Apollo 1 fire kills astronauts Gus Grissom, Ed White, and Roger B. Chaffee; the Six-Day War reshapes the Middle East; the Beatles release Sgt. Pepper's Lonely Hearts Club Band, a landmark of 1960s counterculture; the Nigerian Civil War begins as Biafra declares independence; the 1967 March on the Pentagon draws tens of thousands in protest of the Vietnam War; Che Guevara is captured and executed in Bolivia; the 1967 Detroit riot becomes one of the deadliest U.S. uprisings; the 1967 Hong Kong riots bring months of unrest; the Green Bay Packers defeat the Kansas City Chiefs in the inaugural Super Bowl.

1967 (MCMLXVII) was a common year starting on Sunday of the Gregorian calendar, the 1967th year of the Common Era (CE) and Anno Domini (AD) designations, the 967th year of the 2nd millennium, the 67th year of the 20th century, and the 8th year of the 1960s decade.

== Events ==
=== January ===
- January 6 – Vietnam War: United States Marine Corps and Army of the Republic of Vietnam troops launch Operation Deckhouse Five in the Mekong Delta.
- January 8 – Vietnam War: Operation Cedar Falls starts, in an attempt to eliminate the Iron Triangle.
- January 13 – A military coup occurs in Togo under the leadership of Étienne Eyadema.
- January 15 – Louis Leakey announces the discovery of pre-human fossils in Kenya; he names the species Kenyapithecus africanus.
- January 23
  - In Munich, the trial begins of Wilhelm Harster, accused of the murder of 82,856 Jews (including Anne Frank) when he led German security police during the German occupation of the Netherlands. He is eventually sentenced to 15 years in prison.
  - Milton Keynes in England is founded as a new town by Order in Council, with a planning brief to become a city of 250,000 people. Its initial designated area encloses three existing towns and twenty one villages. The area to be developed is largely farmland, with evidence of permanent settlement dating back to the Bronze Age.
- January 25 – South Vietnamese junta leader and Prime Minister Nguyen Cao Ky forces his rival, Deputy Prime Minister and Defence Minister Nguyen Huu Co, into exile while overseas on a diplomatic visit.
- January 26 – The largest-ever blizzard to hit the US city of Chicago begins.
- January 27
  - Apollo 1: U.S. astronauts Gus Grissom, Ed White and Roger Chaffee are killed when fire breaks out in their Apollo spacecraft during a launch pad test.
  - The United States, Soviet Union and United Kingdom sign the Outer Space Treaty (ratified by USSR May 19; comes into force October 10), prohibiting weapons of mass destruction from space.
- January 31 – West Germany and Romania establish diplomatic relations.

=== February ===
- February 3 – Ronald Ryan becomes the last man hanged in Australia, for murdering a guard while escaping from prison in December 1965.
- February 5
  - NASA launches Lunar Orbiter 3.
  - Italy's first guided missile cruiser, the Vittorio Veneto, is launched.
  - General Anastasio Somoza Debayle becomes president of Nicaragua.
- February 6 – Alexei Kosygin arrives in the UK for an 8-day visit. He meets The Queen on February 9.
- February 7 – Serious bushfires in southern Tasmania claim 62 lives and destroy 2,642.7 square kilometres (653,025.4 acres) of land.
- February 10 – The Twenty-fifth Amendment to the United States Constitution (presidential succession and disability) is ratified.
- February 11 – Burgess Ice Rise, lying off the west coast of Alexander Island, Antarctica, is first mapped by the British Antarctic Survey (BAS).
- February 13 – American researchers discover the Madrid Codices by Leonardo da Vinci in the National Library of Spain.
- February 22
  - Suharto takes power from Sukarno in Indonesia (see Transition to the New Order and Supersemar).
  - Donald Sangster becomes the new prime minister of Jamaica, succeeding Alexander Bustamante.
- February 23
  - Trinidad and Tobago is the first Commonwealth nation to join the Organization of American States.
  - The Twenty-fifth Amendment to the United States Constitution is enacted.
- February 25 – Britain's second Polaris missile submarine, HMS Renown, is launched.
- February 26 – A Soviet nuclear test is conducted at the Semipalatinsk Test Site, Eastern Kazakhstan.

=== March ===
- March 1
  - Brazilian police arrest Franz Stangl, ex-commander of Treblinka and Sobibór extermination camps.
  - Óscar Gestido is sworn in as President of Uruguay after 15 years of collegiate government.
- March 4
  - The first North Sea gas is pumped ashore at Easington, East Riding of Yorkshire, UK.
  - Queens Park Rangers become the first 3rd Division side to win the English Football League Cup at Wembley Stadium, defeating West Bromwich Albion 3–2.
- March 9 – Joseph Stalin's daughter, Svetlana Alliluyeva, defects to the United States via the U.S. Embassy in New Delhi.
- March 11 – The first phase of the Cambodian Civil War begins between the Kingdom of Cambodia and the Khmer Rouge.
- March 12 – The Indonesian State Assembly takes all presidential powers from Sukarno and names Suharto as acting president (Suharto resigned in 1998).
- March 13 – Moise Tshombe, ex-prime minister of Congo, is sentenced to death in absentia.
- March 14
  - The body of U.S. President John F. Kennedy is moved to a permanent burial place at Arlington National Cemetery.
  - Nine executives of the German pharmaceutical company Grunenthal are charged with breaking German drug laws because of thalidomide.
- March 18
  - Torrey Canyon oil spill: The supertanker SS Torrey Canyon runs aground between Land's End and the Scilly Isles off the coast of Britain, causing the biggest oil spill in history up to that point.
- March 19 – A referendum in French Somaliland about whether its French status should be retained.
- March 21
  - Vietnam War: In ongoing campus unrest, Howard University students protesting the Vietnam War, the ROTC program on campus and the draft, confront Gen. Lewis Hershey, then head of the U.S. Selective Service System, and as he attempts to deliver an address, shout him down, with one protester chanting "America is the Black man's battleground."
  - Charles Manson is released from Terminal Island. Telling the authorities that prison had become his home, he requests permission to stay. Upon his release, he relocates to San Francisco where he spends the Summer of Love.
- March 26 – Jim Thompson, co-founder of the Thai Silk Company, disappears from the Cameron Highlands.
- March 28 – Pope Paul VI issues the encyclical Populorum progressio.
- March 29
  - The first French nuclear submarine, Le Redoutable, is launched.
  - The SEACOM Asian telephone cable is inaugurated.
  - Torrey Canyon oil spill: British Fleet Air Arm and Royal Air Force aircraft bomb and sink the grounded supertanker SS Torrey Canyon.

=== April ===
- April 2 – A United Nations delegation arrives in Aden as its independence approaches. The delegation leaves April 7, accusing British authorities of lack of cooperation. The British say the delegation did not contact them.
- April 4 – Martin Luther King Jr. denounces the Vietnam War during his sermon at the Riverside Church in New York City.
- April 7 – Six-Day War (approach): Israeli fighters shoot down 7 Syrian MIG-21s.
- April 8 – Puppet on a String by Sandie Shaw (music and lyrics by Bill Martin and Phil Coulter) wins the Eurovision Song Contest 1967 for the United Kingdom.
- April 9 – The first Boeing 737 (A-100 series) takes its maiden flight.
- April 10 – The AFTRA strike is settled just in time for the 39th Academy Awards ceremony to be held, hosted by Bob Hope. Best Picture goes to A Man for All Seasons.
- April 15 – Large demonstrations are held against US involvement in the Vietnam War in New York City and San Francisco. The march, organized by the National Mobilization Committee to End the War in Vietnam, from Central Park to the United Nations drew hundreds of thousands of people, including Dr. Martin Luther King Jr., Harry Belafonte, James Bevel, and Dr. Benjamin Spock, who marched and spoke at the event. A simultaneous march in San Francisco is attended by Coretta Scott King.
- April 20
  - The Surveyor 3 probe lands on the Moon.
  - A Globe Air Bristol Britannia turboprop crashes at Nicosia, Cyprus, killing 126 people.
- April 21
  - Greece suffers a military coup by a group of military officers, who establish a military dictatorship led by Georgios Papadopoulos; future-Prime Minister Andreas Papandreou remains a political prisoner till December 25. The dictatorship ends in 1974.
  - An outbreak of tornadoes strikes the upper Midwest section of the United States (in particular the Chicago area, including the suburbs of Belvidere and Oak Lawn, Illinois where 33 people are killed and 500 injured).
- April 23 – A group of young leftist radicals are expelled from the Nicaraguan Socialist Party (PSN). This group goes on to found the Socialist Workers Party (POS).
- April 24 – Soyuz 1: Vladimir Komarov becomes the first Soviet cosmonaut to die, when the parachute of his space capsule fails during re-entry.
- April 27 – Montreal, Quebec, Expo 67, a World's Fair to coincide with the Canadian Confederation centennial, officially opens with Prime Minister Lester B. Pearson igniting the Expo Flame in the Place des Nations.
- April 28
  - In Houston, Texas, United States, boxer Muhammad Ali refuses military service. He is stripped of his boxing title and barred from professional boxing for the next three years.
  - Expo 67 opens to the public, with over 310,000 people attending. Al Carter from Chicago is the first visitor as noted by Expo officials.
  - The U.S. aerospace manufacturer McDonnell Douglas is formed through a merger of McDonnell Aircraft and Douglas Aircraft (it becomes part of The Boeing Company three decades later).
- April 29 – Fidel Castro announces that all intellectual property belongs to the people and that Cuba intends to translate and publish technical literature without compensation.
- April 30 – Moscow's 537 m tall TV tower is finished.

=== May ===
- May 1 – GO Transit, Canada's first interregional public transit system, is established.
- May 2
  - The Toronto Maple Leafs win the Stanley Cup. It is their last Stanley Cup and last finals appearance to date. It will turn out to be the last game in the Original Six era. Six more teams will be added in the fall.
  - British Prime Minister Harold Wilson announces that the United Kingdom has decided to apply for EEC membership.
- May 4 – Lunar Orbiter 4 is launched by the United States.
- May 6
  - Zakir Husain is the first Muslim to become president of India.
  - Hong Kong 1967 riots: Clashes between striking workers and police kill 51 and injure 800.
- May 8 – The Philippine province of Davao is split into three: Davao del Norte, Davao del Sur, and Davao Oriental.
- May 9 – A partial solar eclipse took place.
- May 10 – The Greek military government accuses Andreas Papandreou of treason.
- May 11 – The United Kingdom and Ireland apply officially for European Economic Community membership.
- May 15 – The Waiting period leading up to the Six-Day War begins.
- May 17
  - Syria mobilizes against Israel.
  - President Gamal Abdal Nasser of Egypt demands withdrawal of the peacekeeping UN Emergency Force in the Sinai. U.N. Secretary-General U Thant complies (May 18).
- May 18
  - Tennessee Governor Ellington repeals the "Monkey Law" (officially the Butler Act; see the Scopes Trial).
  - In Mexico, schoolteacher Lucio Cabañas begins guerrilla warfare in Atoyac de Alvarez, west of Acapulco, in the state of Guerrero.
  - NASA announces the crew for the Apollo 7 space mission (the first in the Apollo series with a crew): Wally Schirra, Donn F. Eisele, and R. Walter Cunningham.
- May 19 – Yuri Andropov becomes KGB chief in the Soviet Union.
- May 20 – The Spring Mobilization Conference, a gathering of 700 antiwar activists is held in Washington D.C. to chart the future moves for the U.S. antiwar movement
- May 22 – The Innovation department store in the centre of Brussels, Belgium, burns down. It is the most devastating fire in Belgian history, resulting in 323 dead and missing and 150 injured.
- May 23
  - A significant worldwide geomagnetic flare unfolded. Radio emissions coming from the Sun jammed military surveillance radars.
  - Egypt closes the Straits of Tiran to Israeli shipping, blockading Israel's southern port of Eilat, and Israel's entire Red Sea coastline.
- 25 May – Celtic F.C. defeat Inter Milan 2–1 in Lisbon to win the European Cup, becoming the first British football club to win the competition. The team, later nicknamed the Lisbon Lions, was composed entirely of players born within 30 miles of Glasgow.
- May 26 – The Beatles release the groundbreaking album Sgt. Pepper's Lonely Hearts Club Band in the United Kingdom. It becomes one of the most influential albums in popular music history.
- May 27
  - Naxalite Guerrilla War: Beginning with a peasant uprising in the town of Naxalbari, this Marxist/Maoist rebellion sputters on in the Indian countryside. The guerrillas operate among the impoverished peasants, fighting both the government security forces and private paramilitary groups funded by wealthy landowners. Most fighting takes place in the states of Andhra Pradesh, Maharashtra, Odisha and Madhya Pradesh.
  - The Australian referendum, 1967 passes with an overwhelming 90% support, removing, from the Australian Constitution, 2 discriminatory sentences referring to Indigenous Australians. It signifies Australia's first step in recognising Indigenous rights.
- May 30 – Biafra, in eastern Nigeria, announces its independence, which is not recognized.

=== June ===
June 5: Six-Day War, Israel defeats Arab countries

- June 2 – Protests in West Berlin against the arrival of the Shah of Iran turn into fights, during which 27-year-old student Benno Ohnesorg is killed by a police officer. His death results in the founding of the terrorist group 2 June Movement.
- June 4 – Stockport air disaster: British Midland flight G-ALHG crashes in Hopes Carr, Stockport, killing 72 passengers and crew.
- June 5 – Six-Day War begins: Israel launches Operation Focus, an attack on Egyptian Air Force airfields; the allied armies of Egypt, Syria, Iraq, and Jordan invade Israel. Battle of Ammunition Hill, start of the Jordanian campaign
- June 7 – East Jerusalem is captured in a battle conducted by Israeli forces, without the use of artillery, in order to avoid damage to the Holy City.
- June 8
  - Ras Sedr massacre in the Sinai Peninsula: a mass killing of dozens of Egyptian prisoners of war by the Israel Defense Forces.
  - USS Liberty incident: a United States Navy spy ship is attacked by Israeli forces, allegedly in error, killing 34 crew.
  - Egypt severs diplomatic relations with the United States.
- June 10
  - Six-Day War ends: Israel and Syria agree to a United Nations-mediated cease-fire.
  - The Soviet Union severs diplomatic relations with Israel.
  - Margrethe, heir apparent to the throne of Denmark, marries French count Henri de Laborde de Monpezat.
- June 12
  - Loving v. Virginia: The United States Supreme Court declares all U.S. state laws prohibiting interracial marriage to be unconstitutional.
  - Venera program: Venera 4 is launched by the Soviet Union (the first space probe to analyze another planet's atmosphere and successfully return data).
- June 13 – Solicitor General Thurgood Marshall is nominated as the first African American justice of the United States Supreme Court.
- June 14 – Mariner program: Mariner 5 is launched toward Venus.
- June 17 – Project 639: The People's Republic of China tests its first hydrogen bomb.
- June 18 – Eighteen British soldiers are killed in the Aden police mutiny.
- June 23 – Cold War: U.S. President Lyndon B. Johnson meets with Soviet Premier Alexei Kosygin in Glassboro, New Jersey, for the 3-day Glassboro Summit Conference. Johnson travels to Los Angeles for a dinner at the Century Plaza Hotel where earlier in the day thousands of war protesters clashed with L.A. police.
- June 24 – Flooding kills six cavers in Mossdale Caverns in the United Kingdom, the single deadliest incident in British caving.
- June 25 – 400 million viewers watch Our World, the first live, international, satellite television production. It features the live debut of The Beatles' song "All You Need Is Love".
- June 26
  - Pope Paul VI ordains 27 new cardinals (one of whom is the future Pope John Paul II).
  - The Buffalo Race Riot begins, lasting until July 1, and leads to over 180 arrests.

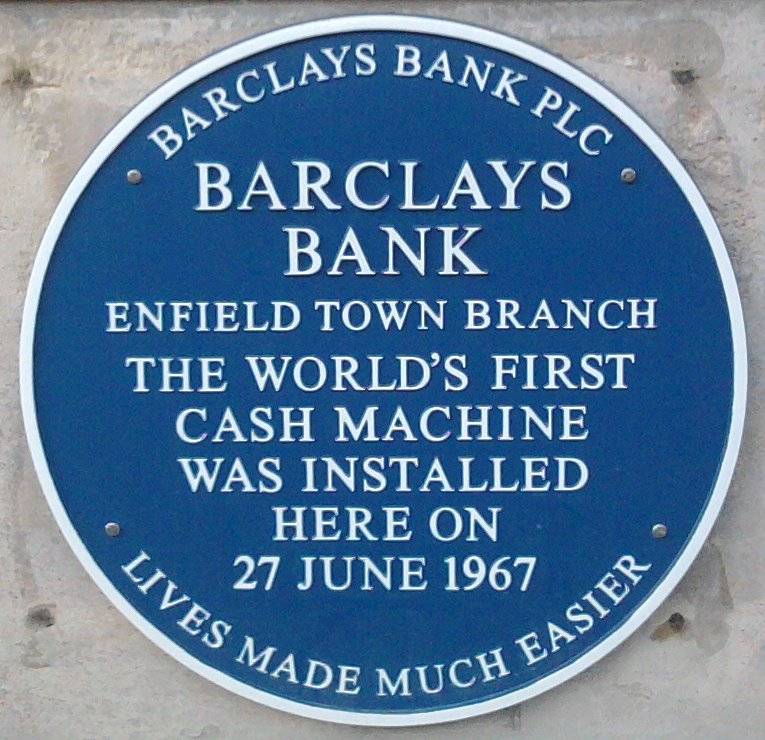
Plaque commemorating installation of world's first bank cash machine

- June 27 – The first automatic cash machine (voucher-based) is installed, in the office of Barclays Bank in Enfield, UK.
- June 28 – Israel declares the annexation of East Jerusalem.
- June 30 – Moise Tshombe, former president of Katanga and former prime minister of the Democratic Republic of the Congo, is kidnapped and taken to Algeria.

=== July ===
- July 1
  - Canada celebrates its first one hundred years of Confederation.
  - The EEC joins with the European Coal and Steel Community and the European Atomic Community, to form the European Communities (from the 1980s usually known as European Community [EC]).
  - Seaboard Air Line Railroad merges with Atlantic Coast Line Railroad to become Seaboard Coast Line Railroad, first step to today's CSX Transportation.
  - The first UK colour television broadcasts begin on BBC2. The first one is from the Wimbledon tennis championships. A full colour service begins on BBC2 on December 2.
  - American Samoa's first constitution becomes effective.
- July 3 – A military rebellion led by Belgian mercenary Jean Schramme begins in Katanga, Democratic Republic of the Congo.
- July 4 – The British Parliament decriminalizes homosexuality.
- July 5 – Troops of Belgian mercenary commander Jean Schramme revolt against Mobutu Sese Seko, and try to take control of Stanleyville, Congo.
- July 6
  - Nigerian Civil War: Nigerian forces invade the secessionist Biafra May 30.
  - Langenweddingen level crossing disaster: A level crossing collision between a train loaded with children and a tanker-truck near Magdeburg, East Germany, kills 94 people, mostly children.
- July 10
  - Heavy massive rains and a landslide at Kobe and Kure, Hiroshima, Japan, kill at least 371.
  - New Zealand decimalises its currency from pound to dollar at £1 to $2 ($1 = 10/-).
- July 12
  - The Greek military regime strips 480 Greeks of their citizenship.
  - 1967 Newark riots: After the arrest of an African-American cab driver for allegedly illegally driving around a police car and gunning it down the road, race riots break out in Newark, New Jersey, lasting 5 days and leaving 26 dead.
- July 14 – Near Newark, New Jersey, the Plainfield, NJ, riots take place.
- July 16 – A prison riot in Jay, Florida, United States leaves 37 dead.
- July 19
  - A race riot breaks out in the North Side of Minneapolis on Plymouth Street during the Minneapolis Aquatennial Parade; businesses are vandalized and fires break out in the area, although the disturbance is quelled within hours. However, the next day a shooting sets off another incident in the same area that leads to 18 fires, 36 arrests, 3 shootings, 2 dozen people injured, and damages totaling 4.2 million. Two more such incidents occur during the following two weeks.
  - Eighty-two people are killed in a collision between Piedmont Airlines Flight 22 and a Cessna 310 near Hendersonville, North Carolina, United States.
- July 20 – Chilean poet Pablo Neruda receives the first Viareggio-Versile prize.
- July 23–31 – 12th Street Riot: In Detroit, one of the worst riots in United States history begins on 12th Street in the predominantly African American inner city: 43 are killed, 342 injured and 1,400 buildings burned.
- July 24 – During an official state visit to Canada, French President Charles de Gaulle declares to a crowd of over 100,000 in Montreal: Vive le Québec libre! (Long live free Quebec!). The statement, interpreted as support for Quebec independence, delights many Quebecers but angers the Canadian government and many English Canadians.
- July 29
  - An explosion and fire aboard the U.S. Navy aircraft carrier USS Forrestal in the Gulf of Tonkin leaves 134 dead.
  - An earthquake in Caracas, Venezuela leaves 240 dead.
- July 30 – The 1967 Milwaukee race riots begin, lasting through August 3 and leading to a ten-day shutdown of the city from August 1.

=== August ===
- August 1 – The UAC TurboTrain makes its first journey.
- August 6 – A pulsar is noted by Jocelyn Bell and Antony Hewish. The discovery is first recorded in print in 1968: "An entirely novel kind of star came to light on Aug. 6 last year [...]".
- August 7
  - Vietnam War: The People's Republic of China agrees to give North Vietnam an undisclosed amount of aid in the form of a grant.
  - A general strike in the old quarter of Jerusalem protests Israel's unification of the city.
- August 8 – The Association of Southeast Asian Nations (ASEAN) is founded in Bangkok, Thailand.
- August 9 – Vietnam War – Operation Cochise: United States Marines begin a new operation in the Que Son Valley.
- August 15 – The United Kingdom Marine, &c., Broadcasting (Offences) Act 1967 declares participation in offshore pirate radio illegal. Radio Caroline defies the act and continues broadcasting.
- August 19 – West Germany receives 36 East German prisoners it has "purchased" through the border posts of Herleshausen and Wartha.
- August 21
  - A truce is declared in the Democratic Republic of the Congo.
  - Two U.S. Navy jets stray into the airspace of the People's Republic of China following an attack on a target in North Vietnam and are shot down. Lt. Robert J. Flynn, the only survivor, is captured alive and will be held prisoner by China until 1973.
- August 24 – Pakistan's first steel mill is inaugurated in Chittagong, East Pakistan (Bangladesh).
- August 30 – Thurgood Marshall is confirmed as Justice of the United States Supreme Court. He is the first African American to hold the position.

=== September ===
- September 1
  - The Khmer–Chinese Friendship Association is banned in Cambodia.
  - Ilse Koch, known as the "Witch of Buchenwald", commits suicide in the Bavarian prison of Aichach.
- September 3
  - Nguyễn Văn Thiệu is elected President of South Vietnam.
  - At 5:00 a.m. local time, all road traffic in Sweden switches from left-hand traffic pattern to right-hand traffic.<
- September 4 – Vietnam War – Operation Swift: The United States Marines launch a search and destroy mission in Quảng Nam and Quảng Tín provinces. The ensuing 4-day battle in Que Son Valley kills 114 Americans and 376 North Vietnamese.
- September 10 – In a Gibraltar sovereignty referendum, only 44 voters out of 12,182 in the British Crown colony of Gibraltar support union with Spain.
- September 17
  - A riot during a football match in Kayseri, Turkey leaves 44 dead, about 600 injured.
  - Jim Morrison and The Doors defy CBS censors on The Ed Sullivan Show, when Morrison sings the word "higher" from their #1 hit Light My Fire, despite having been asked not to.
- September 27 – The RMS Queen Mary arrives in Southampton at the end of her last transatlantic crossing.
- September 30 – In the United Kingdom, BBC Radio completely restructures its national programming: the Light Programme is split between new national pop station Radio 1 (modelled on the successful pirate station Radio London) and Radio 2; the cultural Third Programme is rebranded as Radio 3; and the primarily-talk Home Service becomes Radio 4.

=== October ===
- October 3 – An X-15 research aircraft with test pilot William J. Knight establishes an unofficial world fixed-wing speed record of Mach 6.7.
- October 4 – Omar Ali Saifuddin III of Brunei abdicates in favour of his son, His Majesty Sultan Hassanal Bolkiah.
- October 8 – Guerrilla leader Che Guevara and his men are captured in Bolivia; they are executed the following day.
- October 12 – Vietnam War: U.S. Secretary of State Dean Rusk states during a news conference that, because of North Vietnam's opposition, proposals by the U.S. Congress for peace initiatives are futile.
- October 14 – Quebec Nationalism: René Lévesque leaves the Liberal Party.
- October 16 – Thirty-nine people, including singer-activist Joan Baez, are arrested in Oakland, California, for blocking the entrance of that city's military induction center.
- October 17 – Vietnam War: The Battle of Ong Thanh takes place.
- October 18
  - Vietnam War: Students at the University of Wisconsin–Madison protest over recruitment by Dow Chemical on the university campus; 76 are injured in the resulting riot.
  - Walt Disney's 19th full-length animated feature The Jungle Book, the last animated film personally supervised by Disney, is released and becomes an enormous box-office and critical success. On a double bill with the film is the (now) much less well-known true-life adventure, Charlie the Lonesome Cougar.
  - The Venera 4 probe descends through the Venusian atmosphere.
  - A total lunar eclipse occurs.
- October 19 – The Mariner 5 probe flies by Venus.
- October 21
  - Approximately 70,000 Vietnam War protesters march in Washington, D.C. and rally at the Lincoln Memorial; in a successive march that day, 50,000 people march to the Pentagon, where Allen Ginsberg, Abbie Hoffman, and Jerry Rubin symbolically chant to "levitate" the building and "exorcise the evil within."
  - An Egyptian surface-to-surface missile sinks the Israeli destroyer Eilat, killing 47 Israeli sailors. Israel retaliates by shelling Egyptian refineries along the Suez Canal.
- October 23 – Charles de Gaulle becomes the first French Co-Prince of Andorra to visit his Andorran subjects. In addition to being President of France, de Gaulle is a joint ruler (along with Spain's Bishop of Urgel) of the tiny nation located in the mountains between France and Spain, pursuant to the 1278 agreement creating the nation.
- October 25 – The Abortion Act 1967 passes in the British Parliament and receives royal assent two days later.
- October 26
  - The coronation ceremony of Shah Mohammad Reza Pahlavi of Iran, ruler of the nation since 1941, takes place.
  - U.S. Navy pilot John McCain is shot down over North Vietnam and taken prisoner. His capture is confirmed two days later, and he remains a prisoner of war for more than five years.
- October 27 – French President Charles de Gaulle vetoes British entry into the European Economic Community for the second time in the decade.
- October 29
  - President Joseph Mobutu of the Democratic Republic of the Congo launches an offensive against mercenaries in Bukavu.
  - Expo 67 closes in Montreal, after having attracted more than 50 million visitors in six months.
- October 30 – Hong Kong 1967 riots: British troops and Chinese demonstrators clash on the border of China and Hong Kong.

=== November ===
- November – Islamabad officially becomes Pakistan's political capital.
- November 2
  - Vietnam War: U.S. President Lyndon B. Johnson holds a secret meeting with a group of the nation's most prestigious leaders ("the Wise Men") and asks them to suggest ways to unite the American people behind the war effort. They conclude that the American people should be given more optimistic reports on the progress of the war.
  - A non-central total solar eclipse took place.
- November 3 – Vietnam War – Battle of Dak To: Around Đắk Tô (located about 280 miles north of Saigon near the Cambodian border), heavy casualties are suffered on both sides; U.S. troops narrowly win the battle on November 22.
- November 4–5 – In the Democratic Republic of the Congo, mercenaries of Jean Schramme and Jerry Puren withdraw from Bukavu, over the Shangugu Bridge, to Rwanda.
- November 6 – The Rhodesian parliament passes pro-Apartheid laws.
- November 7
  - U.S. President Lyndon B. Johnson signs the Public Broadcasting Act of 1967, establishing the Corporation for Public Broadcasting.
  - Carl B. Stokes is elected Mayor of Cleveland, Ohio, becoming the first African American elected mayor of a major United States city.
  - The 50th anniversary of the Great October Socialist Revolution is celebrated in the Soviet Union.
- November 9 – Apollo program: NASA launches the first Saturn V rocket, successfully carrying the Apollo 4 test spacecraft from Cape Kennedy into Earth orbit.
- November 11 – Vietnam War: In a ceremony in Phnom Penh, Cambodia, 3 United States prisoners of war are released by the Viet Cong and turned over to American "New Left" antiwar activist Tom Hayden.
- November 13 – The first of its many UFO sightings is made at Pudasjärvi, Finland.
- November 14 – The Congress of Colombia, in commemoration of the 150-year anniversary of the death of Policarpa Salavarrieta, declares this day as the "Day of the Colombian Woman".
- November 15 – General Georgios Grivas and his 10,000 strong Greek Army division are forced to leave Cyprus, after 24 Turkish Cypriot civilians are killed by the Greek Cypriot National Guard in the villages of Kophinou and Ayios Theodhoros; relations sour between Nicosia and Athens. Turkey flies sorties into Greek territory, and masses troops in Thrace on her border with Greece.
- November 17
  - Vietnam War: Acting on optimistic reports he was given on November 13, U.S. President Lyndon B. Johnson tells the nation that, while much remains to be done, "We are making progress [...] We are inflicting greater losses than we're taking." (Two months later the Tet Offensive by the Viet Cong is widely reported as a Viet Cong victory by the U.S. press and thus as a major setback to the U.S.)
  - French author Régis Debray is sentenced to 30 years imprisonment in Bolivia. (He will be released in 1970 after less than three years imprisonment.)
- November 18 – The UK pound is devalued from £1 = US$2.80 to £1 = US$2.40.
- November 19 – The establishment of TVB, the first wireless commercial television station in Hong Kong.
- November 20 – The "population clock" of the United States Census Bureau records the U.S. population at 200 million people at 11:03 a.m. Washington, D.C. time.
- November 21 – Vietnam War: United States General William Westmoreland tells news reporters: "I am absolutely certain that whereas in 1965 the enemy was winning, today he is certainly losing."
- November 22 – UN Security Council Resolution 242 is adopted by the UN Security Council, establishing a set of principles aimed at guiding negotiations for an Arab–Israeli peace settlement.
- November 25 – 1967 Australian Senate election: The Liberal/Country Coalition government led by Prime Minister Harold Holt loses two seats, while the Labor Party led by Gough Whitlam fails to make any gains. The Democratic Labor Party wins the two seats from the Liberals and gains the sole balance of power in the Senate.
- November 26 – Major floods hit Lisbon, Portugal, killing 462.
- November 28 – The first pulsar to be discovered by Earth observers is found in the constellation of Vulpecula by astronomers Jocelyn Bell Burnell and Antony Hewish, and is given the name PSR B1919+21.
- November 29 – Vietnam War: U.S. Secretary of Defense Robert McNamara announces his resignation to become president of the World Bank. McNamara's resignation follows U.S. President Lyndon B. Johnson's outright rejection of McNamara's early November recommendations to freeze troop levels, stop the bombing of North Vietnam, and hand over ground fighting to South Vietnam.
- November 30
  - Zulfikar Ali Bhutto founds the Pakistan People's Party and becomes its first chairman. It has gone on to become one of Pakistan's major political parties (alongside the Pakistan Muslim League) that is broken into many factions, bearing the same name under different leaders, such as the Pakistan's Peoples Party Parliamentarians (PPPP).
  - The People's Republic of South Yemen becomes independent of the United Kingdom.
  - Pro-Soviet communists in the Philippines establish Malayang Pagkakaisa ng Kabataan Pilipino as its new youth wing.
  - U.S. Senator Eugene McCarthy announces his candidacy for the Democratic Party presidential nomination, challenging incumbent President Lyndon B. Johnson over the Vietnam War.

=== December ===
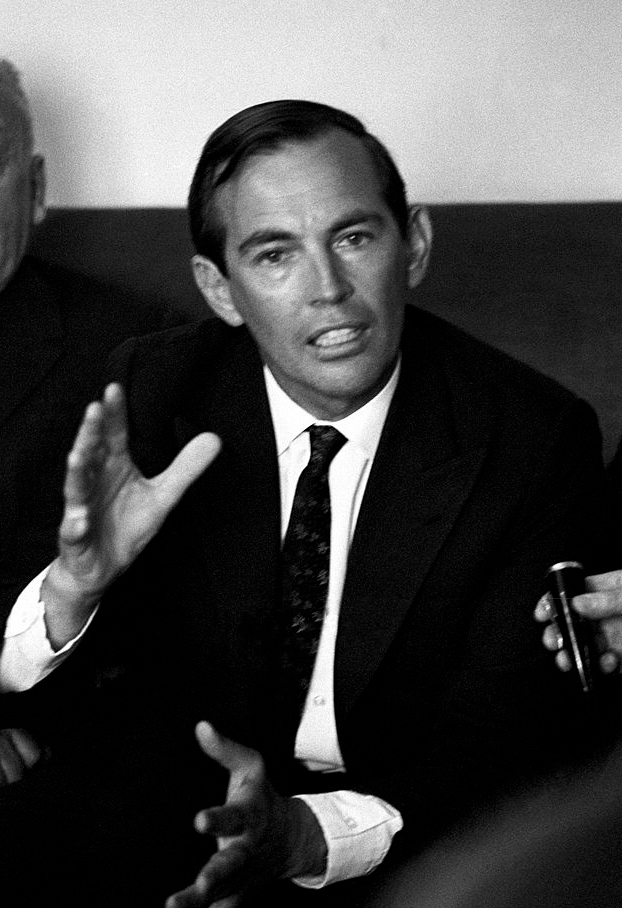
December 3: Christiaan Barnard carries out first heart transplant

- December 1 – The RMS Queen Mary is retired. Her place is taken by the Queen Elizabeth 2.
- December 3 – Christiaan Barnard carries out the world's first heart transplant at Groote Schuur Hospital in Cape Town, South Africa.
- December 4
  - At 6:50 PM, a volcano erupts on Deception Island in Antarctica.
  - Vietnam War: U.S. and South Vietnamese forces engage Viet Cong troops in the Mekong Delta (235 of the 300-strong Viet Cong battalion are killed).
- December 5 – In New York City, Benjamin Spock and Allen Ginsberg are arrested for protesting against the Vietnam War.
- December 6 – Vice President Jorge Pacheco Areco is sworn in as President of Uruguay after President Oscar Gestido dies in office.
- December 8 – Magical Mystery Tour is released by The Beatles as a double EP in the UK, while the only psychedelic rock album by The Rolling Stones, Their Satanic Majesties Request, is released in the UK and in the US.
- December 9
  - Nicolae Ceaușescu becomes the Chairman of the Romanian State Council, making him the de facto leader of Romania.
  - Jim Morrison is arrested on stage in New Haven, Connecticut for attempting to spark a riot in the audience during a concert.
- December 11 – Supersonic airliner Concorde is unveiled in Toulouse, France.
- December 13 – King Constantine II of Greece flees the country when his coup attempt fails.
- December 15 – The Silver Bridge over the Ohio River in Point Pleasant, West Virginia, collapses, killing 46 people.
- December 17 – Harold Holt, 17th Prime Minister of Australia, disappears when swimming at Cheviot Beach, 60 km from Melbourne. He was briefly replaced as prime minister by John McEwen, until the Liberal Party elected Minister for Education and Science John Gorton as leader.
- December 19 – The Rescue Agreement setting forth rights and obligations in outer space is voted into consensus by the United Nations General Assembly.
- December 29 – Korean automobile manufacturer Hyundai Motor is founded.
- December 31 – Motorcycle daredevil Evel Knievel attempts to jump 141 feet over the Caesars Palace Fountains on the Las Vegas Strip in the United States. Knievel crashes on landing and the accident is caught on film.

=== Date unknown ===
- Warner Bros. becomes a wholly owned subsidiary of Seven Arts Productions, thus becoming Warner Bros.-Seven Arts.
- The Jari project begins in the Amazon.
- Albania is officially declared an atheist state by its leader, Enver Hoxha.
- Lonsdaleite (the rarest allotrope of carbon) is first discovered in the Barringer Crater, Arizona.
- St Christopher's Hospice, the world's first purpose-built secular hospice specialising in palliative care of the terminally ill, is established in South London by Dame Cicely Saunders with the support of Albertine Winner.
- PAL is first introduced in Germany.
- Gunsmoke, after 12 seasons and with declining ratings, almost gets cancelled, but protests from viewers, network affiliates and even members of Congress and especially William S. Paley, the head of the network, lead the network to move the series from its longtime late Saturday time slot to early Mondays for the fall—displacing Gilligan's Island, which initially had been renewed for a fourth season but is cancelled instead. Gunsmoke would remain on CBS until 1975.
- The Greek military junta exiles Melina Mercouri.

== Births ==
=== January ===
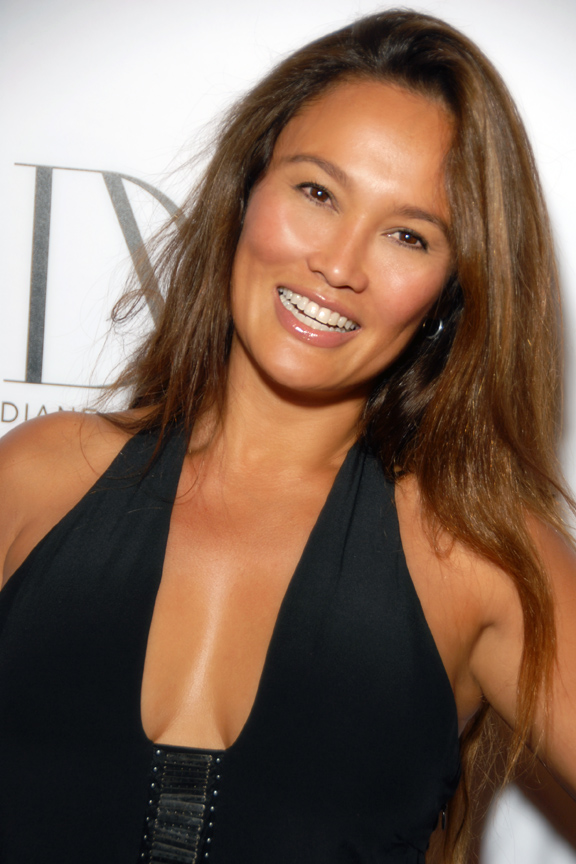
Tia Carrere

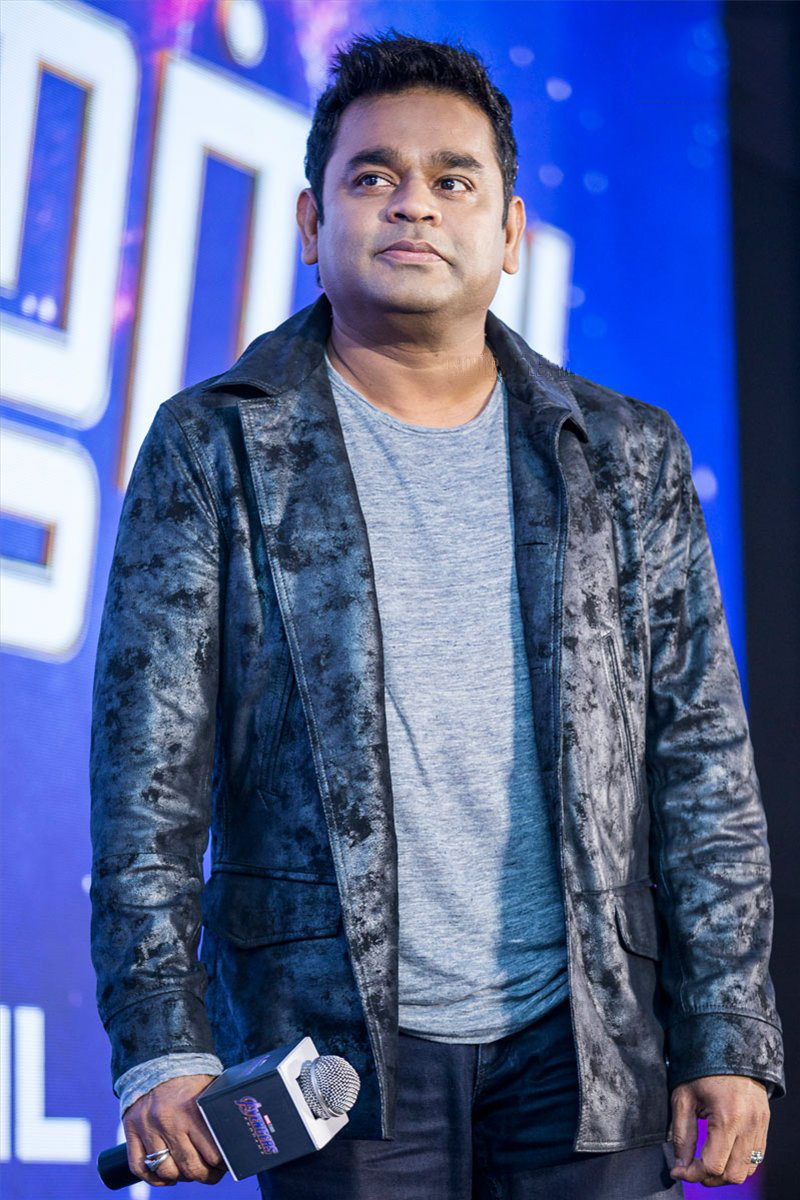
A.R. Rahman

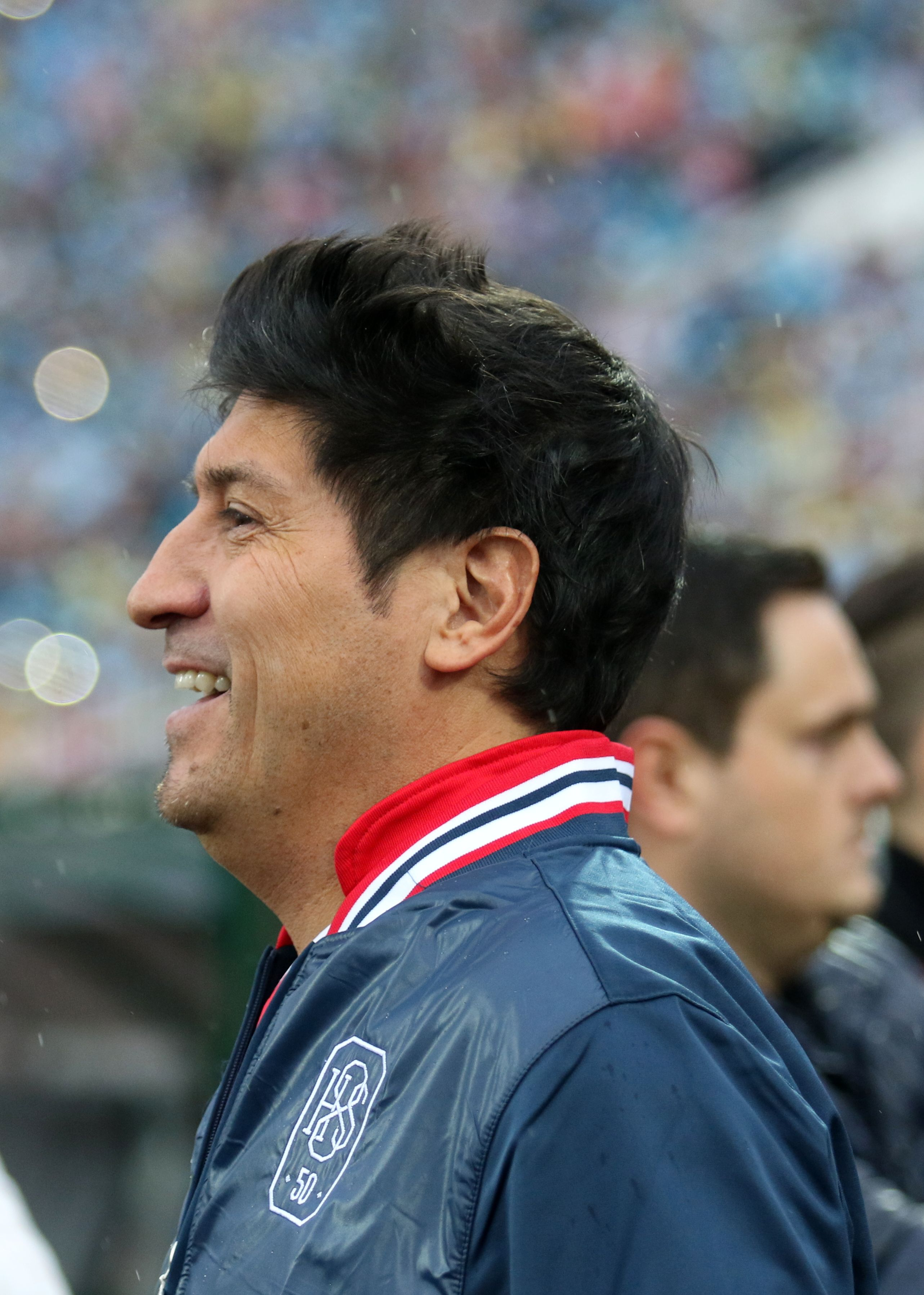
Iván Zamorano

- January 1 – Tawera Nikau, New Zealand rugby league player, coach, administrator and commentator
- January 2
  - Tia Carrere, American actress
  - Francois Pienaar, South African rugby union player
- January 6 – A. R. Rahman, Indian composer, singer, and music producer
- January 7
  - Nick Clegg, British politician
  - Irrfan Khan, Indian actor (d. 2020)
- January 8 – R. Kelly, American R&B singer, songwriter, and convicted sex offender
- January 9 – Dave Matthews, South African–born American musician
- January 12 – Vendela Kirsebom, Norwegian supermodel
- January 14 – Leo Ortolani, Italian comic book author
- January 15 – Lisa Lisa, American actress and singer
- January 16 – Andrea James, American producer and author
- January 17 – Song Kang-ho, Korean actor
- January 18 – Iván Zamorano, Chilean footballer
- January 20 – Kellyanne Conway, American pollster, political consultant, and pundit
- January 21 – Artashes Minasian, Armenian chess grandmaster
- January 23
  - Magdalena Andersson, 34th Prime Minister of Sweden
  - Belkis Ayón, Cuban printmaker (d. 1999)
  - Naim Süleymanoğlu, Turkish weightlifter (d. 2017)
- January 24 – Phil LaMarr, American actor, voice actor, comedian, and writer
- January 25 – Voltaire, Cuban singer
- January 29
  - Khalid Skah, Moroccan long-distance runner
  - Cyril Suk, Czech tennis player
- January 31 – Fat Mike, American musician and producer

=== February ===
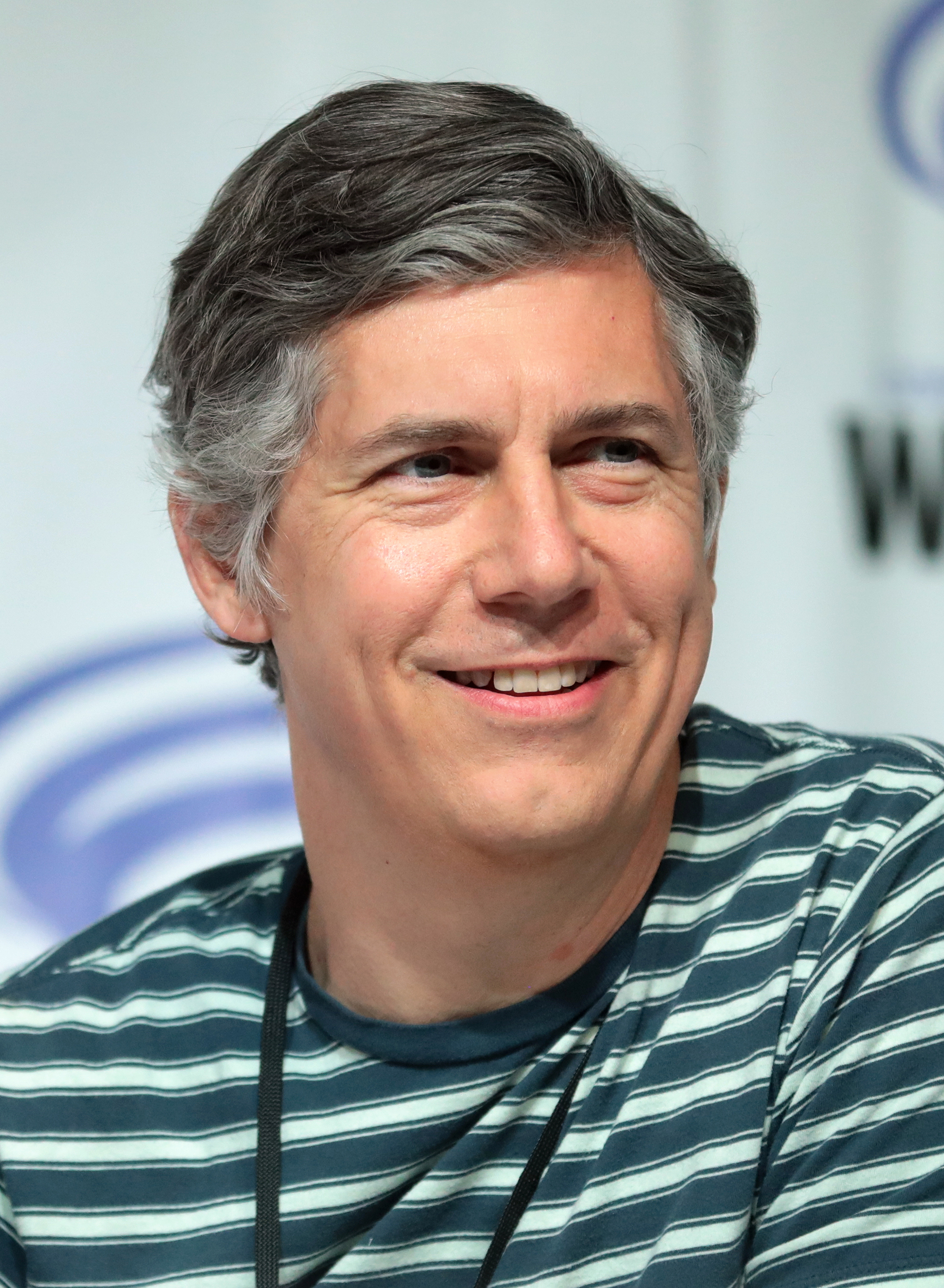
Chris Parnell

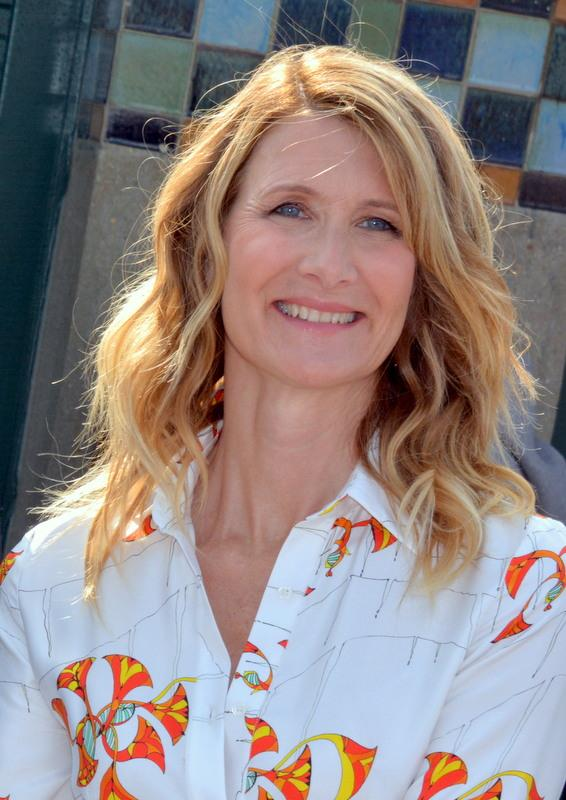
Laura Dern

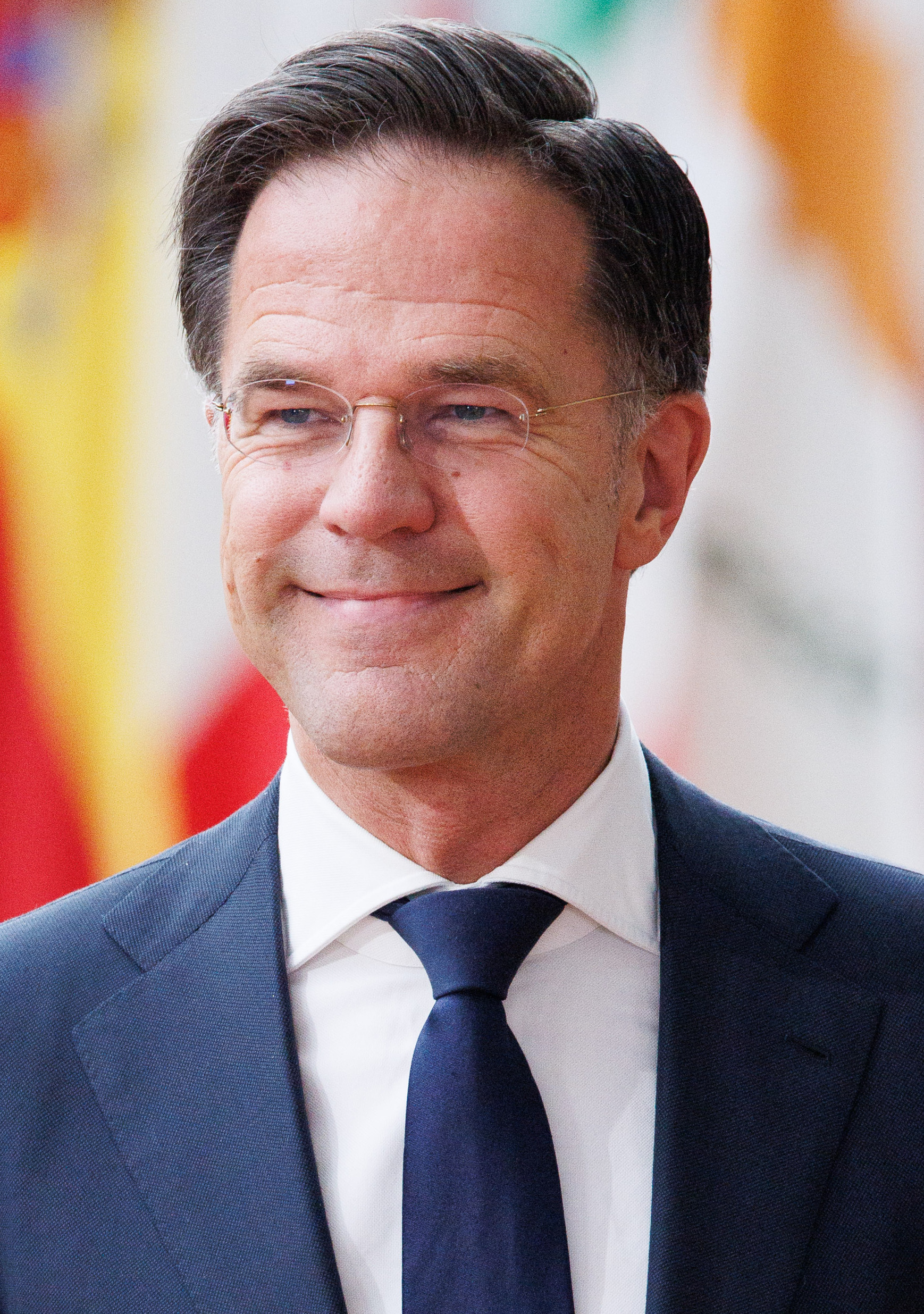
Mark Rutte

- February 1 – Meg Cabot, American teen author
- February 4 – Sergei Grinkov, Russian figure skater (d. 1995)
- February 5 – Chris Parnell, American actor, voice artist, comedian, and singer
- February 6 – Izumi Sakai, Japanese singer (Zard) (d. 2007)
- February 10
  - Laura Dern, American actress
  - Vince Gilligan, American writer, director and producer
- February 14
  - Manuela Maleeva, Bulgarian born-Swiss tennis player
  - Mark Rutte, Dutch politician, 50th Prime Minister of the Netherlands (2010–present) and NATO Secretary General
  - Sir Stelios Haji-Ioannou, British-Greek entrepreneur
  - Bernie Moreno, American politician and businessman
- February 18
  - Roberto Baggio, Italian football player
  - Colin Jackson, British former sprint and hurdling athlete
- February 19 – Benicio del Toro, Puerto Rican actor
- February 20
  - Kurt Cobain, American musician (Nirvana) (d. 1994)
  - Lili Taylor, American actress
- February 26
  - Currie Graham, Canadian actor
  - Kazuyoshi Miura, Japanese footballer
- February 27 – Jonathan Ive, British industrial designer (Apple Inc.)

=== March ===
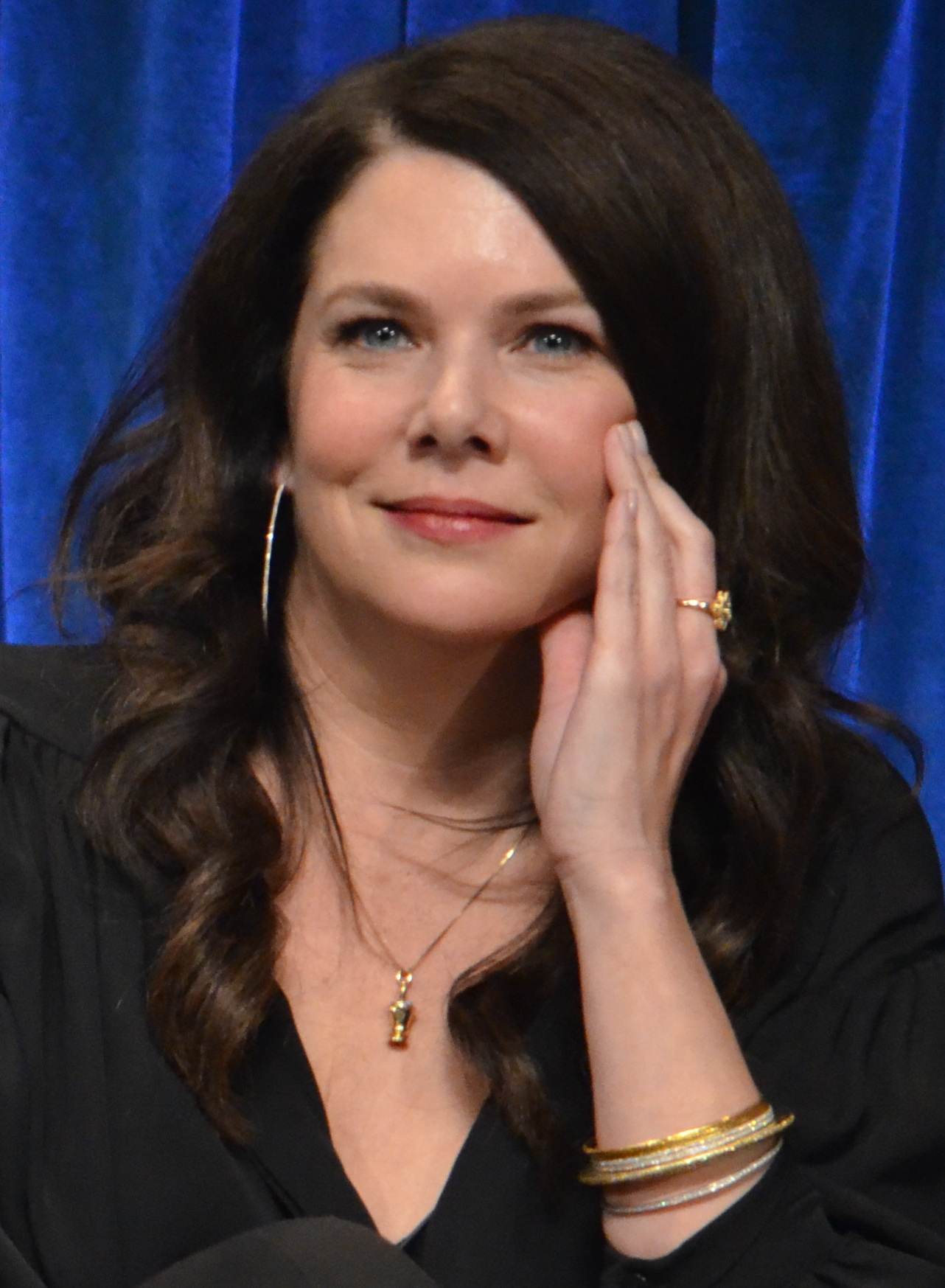
Lauren Graham

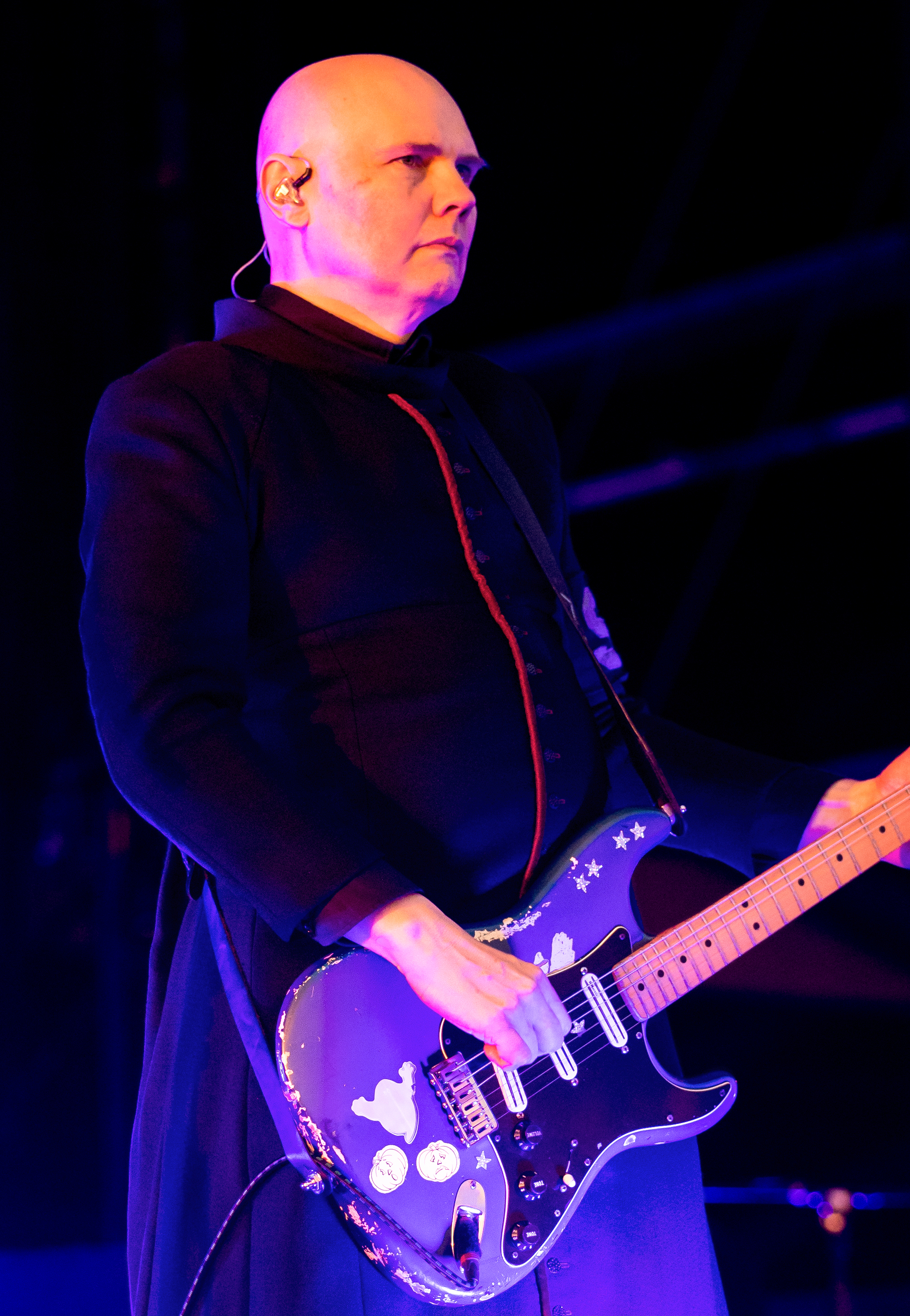
Billy Corgan

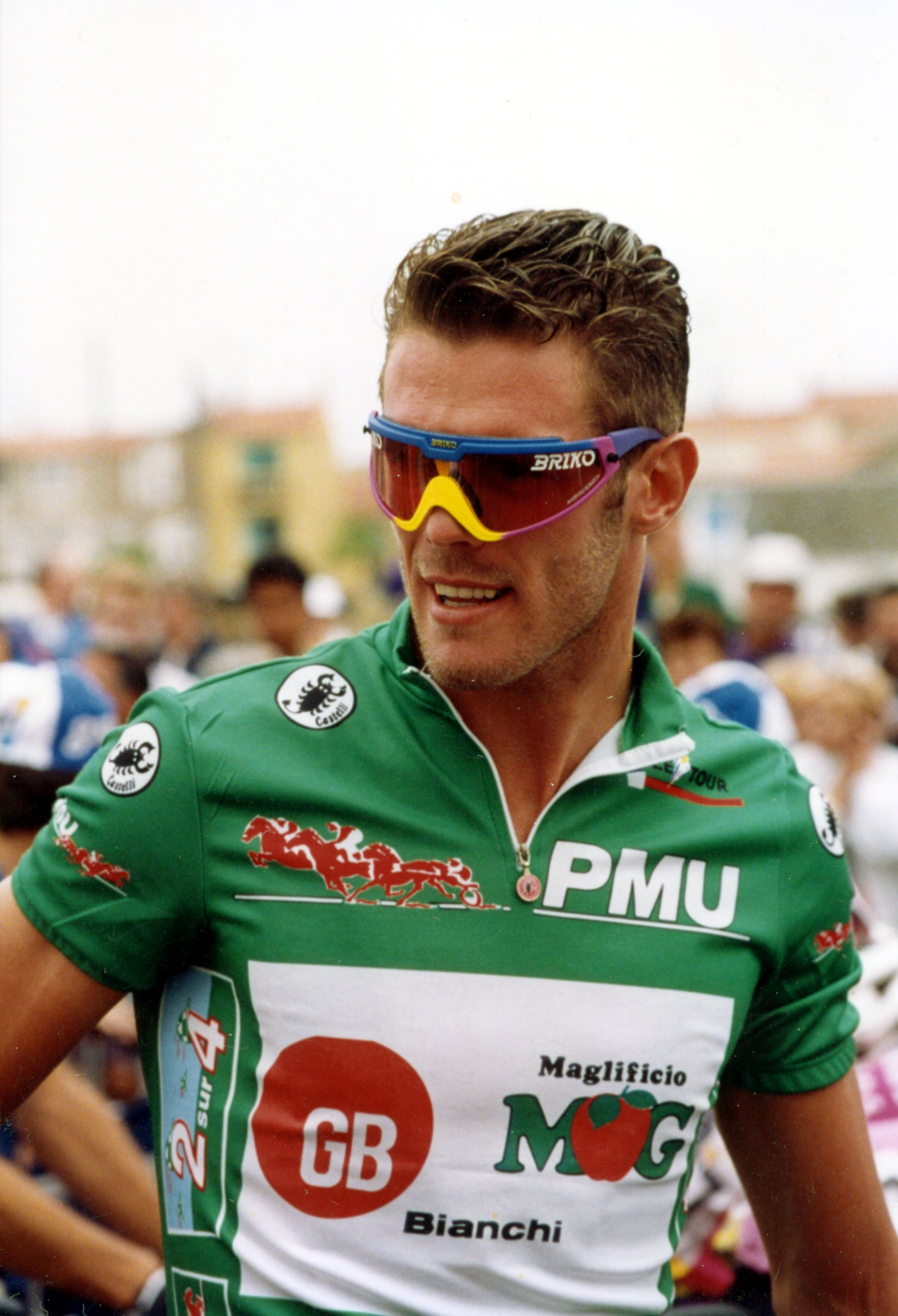
Mario Cipollini

- March 1 – George Eads, American actor
- March 4 – Daryll Cullinan, South African cricketer
- March 6
  - Connie Britton, American actress
  - Glenn Greenwald, American journalist and author
  - Mihai Tudose, Prime Minister of Romania
- March 11 – John Barrowman, Scottish-American actor and singer
- March 13
  - Andrés Escobar, Colombian football player (d. 1994)
  - Roger Schmidt, German football player and coach
- March 15 – Naoko Takeuchi, Japanese artist
- March 16 – Lauren Graham, American actress and singer
- March 17 – Billy Corgan, American musician and singer-songwriter, frontman of The Smashing Pumpkins
- March 19 – Sandra Dombrowski, Swiss ice hockey player and referee
- March 21 – Jonas Berggren, Swedish musician
- March 22 – Mario Cipollini, Italian cyclist
- March 25
  - Matthew Barney, American sculptor, photographer and filmmaker
  - Debi Thomas, American figure skater
- March 27
  - Kumara Jayakody, Sri Lankan politician
  - Kenta Kobashi, Japanese professional wrestler
  - Talisa Soto, American actress
- March 29 – Nathalie Cardone, French actress and singer
- March 30
  - Albert-László Barabási, Romanian-born Hungarian-American physicist
  - Megumi Hayashibara, Japanese actress and voice actress

=== April ===
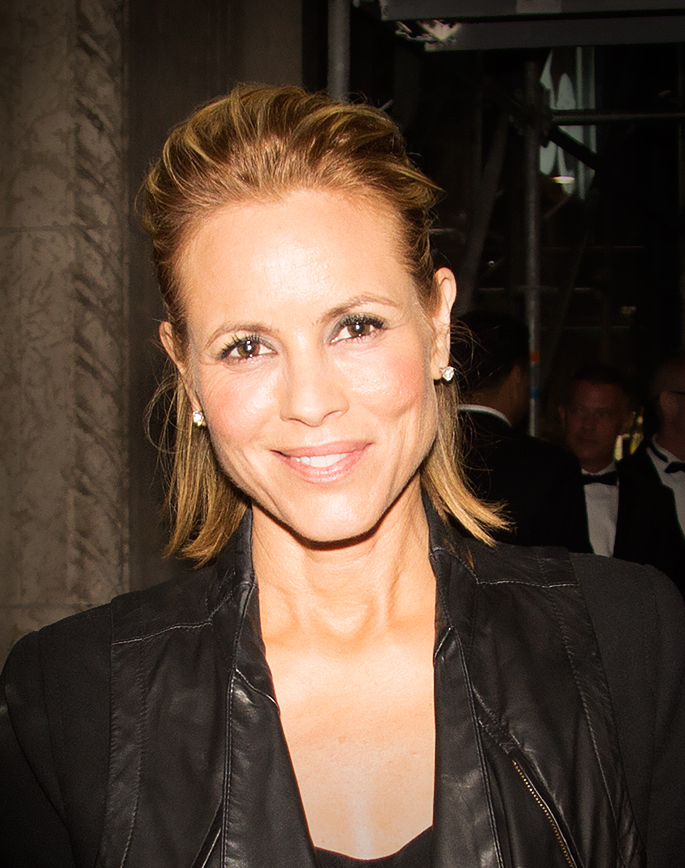
Maria Bello

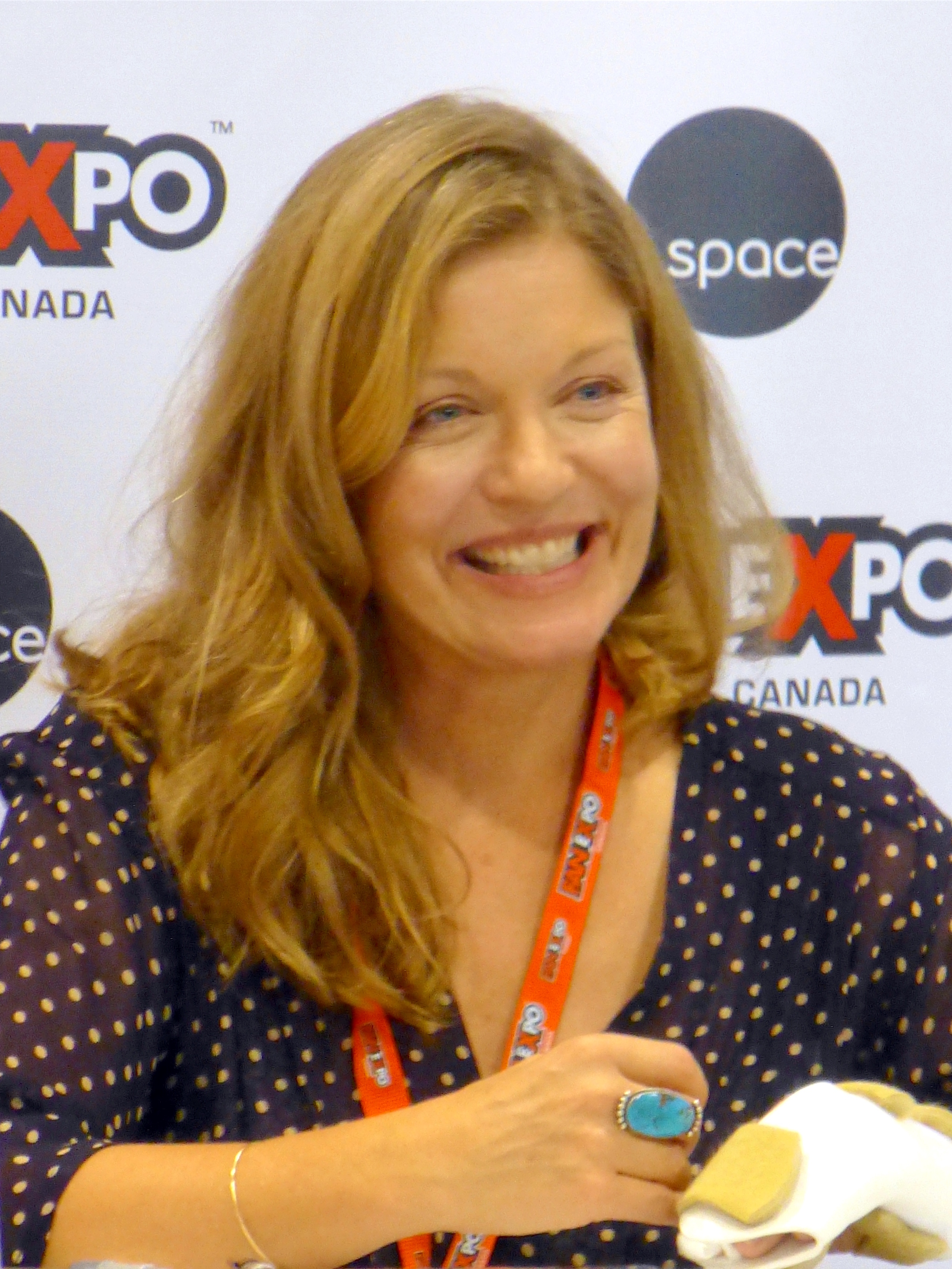
Sheryl Lee

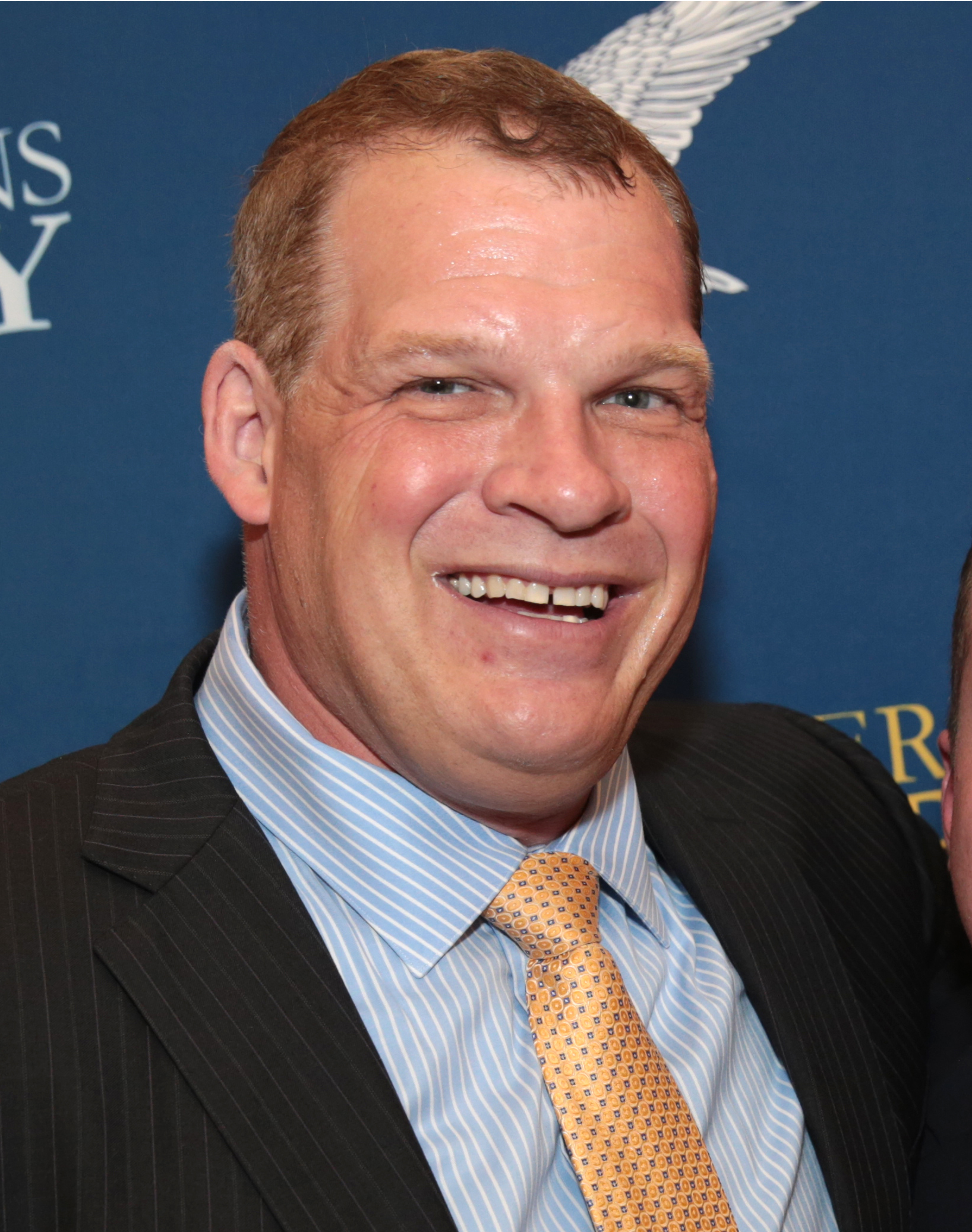
Kane

- April 2 – Renée Estevez, American actress and writer
- April 9 – Sam Harris, American neuroscientist and political podcast host
- April 11 – Liina Olmaru, Estonian actress
- April 14 – Steve Chiasson, Canadian ice hockey player (d. 1999)
- April 15 – Dara Torres, American swimmer
- April 17
  - Henry Ian Cusick, Scottish-Peruvian actor and director
  - Kimberly Elise, African-American actress
  - Liz Phair, American musician
- April 18 – Maria Bello, American actress
- April 20 – Raymond van Barneveld, Dutch darts player
- April 22
  - Sheryl Lee, American actress
  - Sherri Shepherd, American comedian and TV show host
- April 23
  - Melina Kanakaredes, American actress
  - Eleonora De Angelis, Italian voice actress
- April 24 – Dino Rađa, Croatian basketball player
- April 26 – Marianne Jean-Baptiste, English actress, singer-songwriter, composer and director
- April 27 – Willem-Alexander of the Netherlands, King of the Netherlands
- April 29
  - Curtis Joseph, Canadian hockey player
  - Rachel Williams, American model, actress and television presenter
- April 30 – Steven Mackintosh, English actor

=== May ===
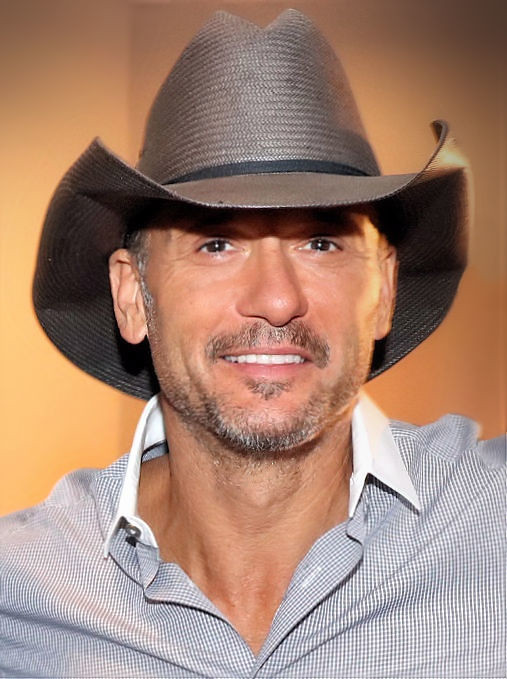
Tim McGraw

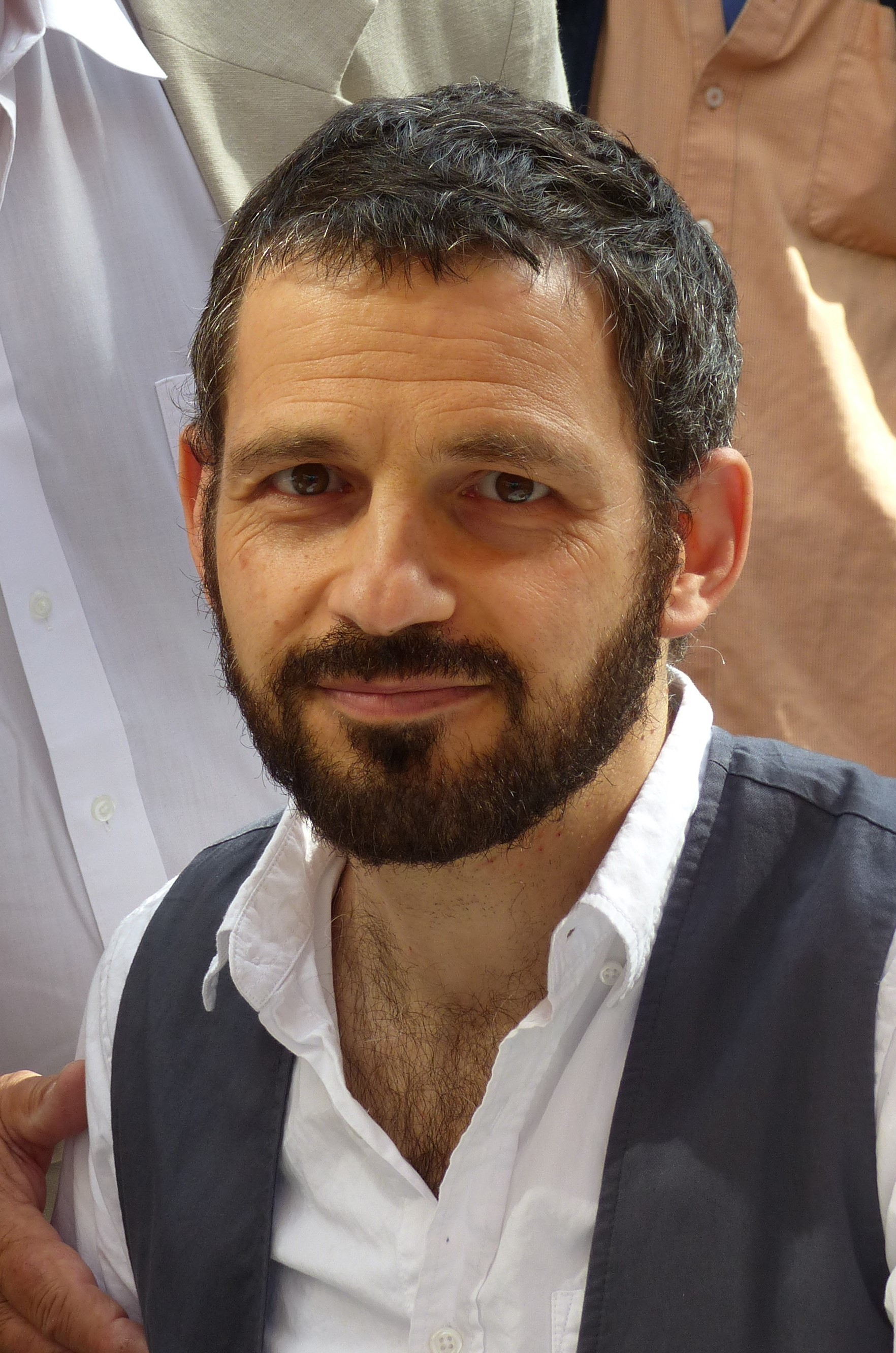
Géza Röhrig

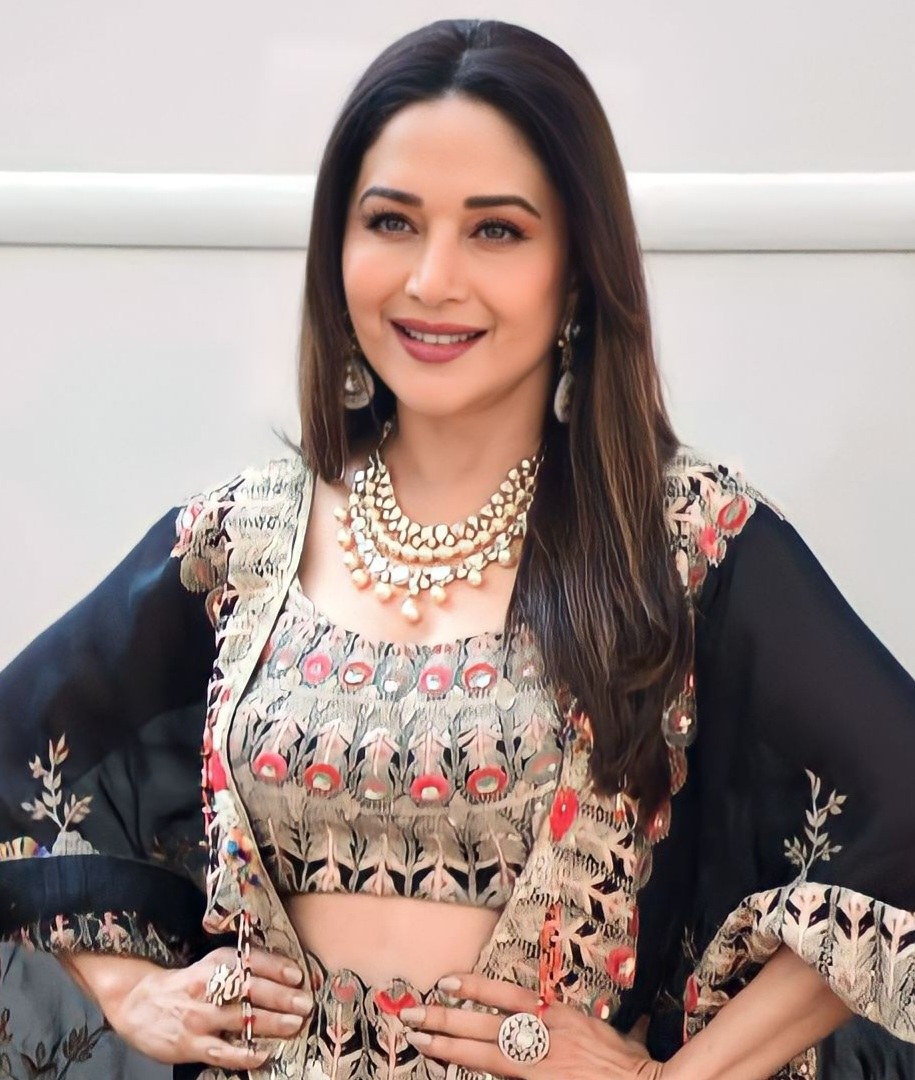
Madhuri Dixit

- May 1
  - Scott Coffey, American actor and director
  - Kenny Hotz, Canadian entertainer
  - Myriam Hernández, Chilean singer
  - Tim McGraw, American country singer
- May 4
  - Ana Gasteyer, American actress
  - Ronny Jackson, American politician and physician
  - Akiko Yajima, Japanese voice actress
- May 5
  - María de Jesús Díaz Marmolejo, Mexican politician
  - Takehito Koyasu, Japanese voice actor
  - Bill Ward, English actor
- May 10 – Nobuhiro Takeda, Japanese footballer and sportscaster
- May 11 – Géza Röhrig, Hungarian actor and poet
- May 12
  - Brent Forrester, American writer and producer
  - Bill Shorten, Australian politician
- May 13
  - Chuck Schuldiner, American singer and guitarist (d. 2001)
  - Melanie Thornton, American singer (La Bouche) (d. 2001)
- May 14 – Tony Siragusa, American football player (d. 2022)
- May 15
  - Madhuri Dixit, Indian actress
  - John Smoltz, American baseball player
- May 17 – Greg Florimo, Australian rugby league player and administrator
- May 19 – Geraldine Somerville, Irish actress
- May 20
  - Anita Anand, Canadian politician and attorney, Minister of Foreign Affairs
  - Pavlos, Crown Prince of Greece
- May 21 – Chris Benoit, Canadian professional wrestler (d. 2007)
- May 22 – Brooke Smith, American actress
- May 24
  - Andrey Borodin, Russian banker
  - Eric Close, American actor
  - Heavy D, Jamaican-born American rapper, singer, record producer, and actor (d. 2011)
  - Bruno Putzulu, French actor
- May 25
  - Poppy Z. Brite, American author
  - Andrew Sznajder, Canadian tennis player
- May 26
  - Eddie McClintock, American actor
  - Kristen Pfaff, American bassist (d. 1994)
- May 27
  - Paul Gascoigne, English footballer
  - Kai Pflaume, German television presenter and game show host
  - Kristen Skjeldal, Norwegian Olympic skier
- May 28 – Glen Rice, American basketball player
- May 29 – Noel Gallagher, British musician (Oasis)
- May 30 – Ana Passos, Portuguese politician and biologist
- May 31 – Sandrine Bonnaire, French actress

=== June ===
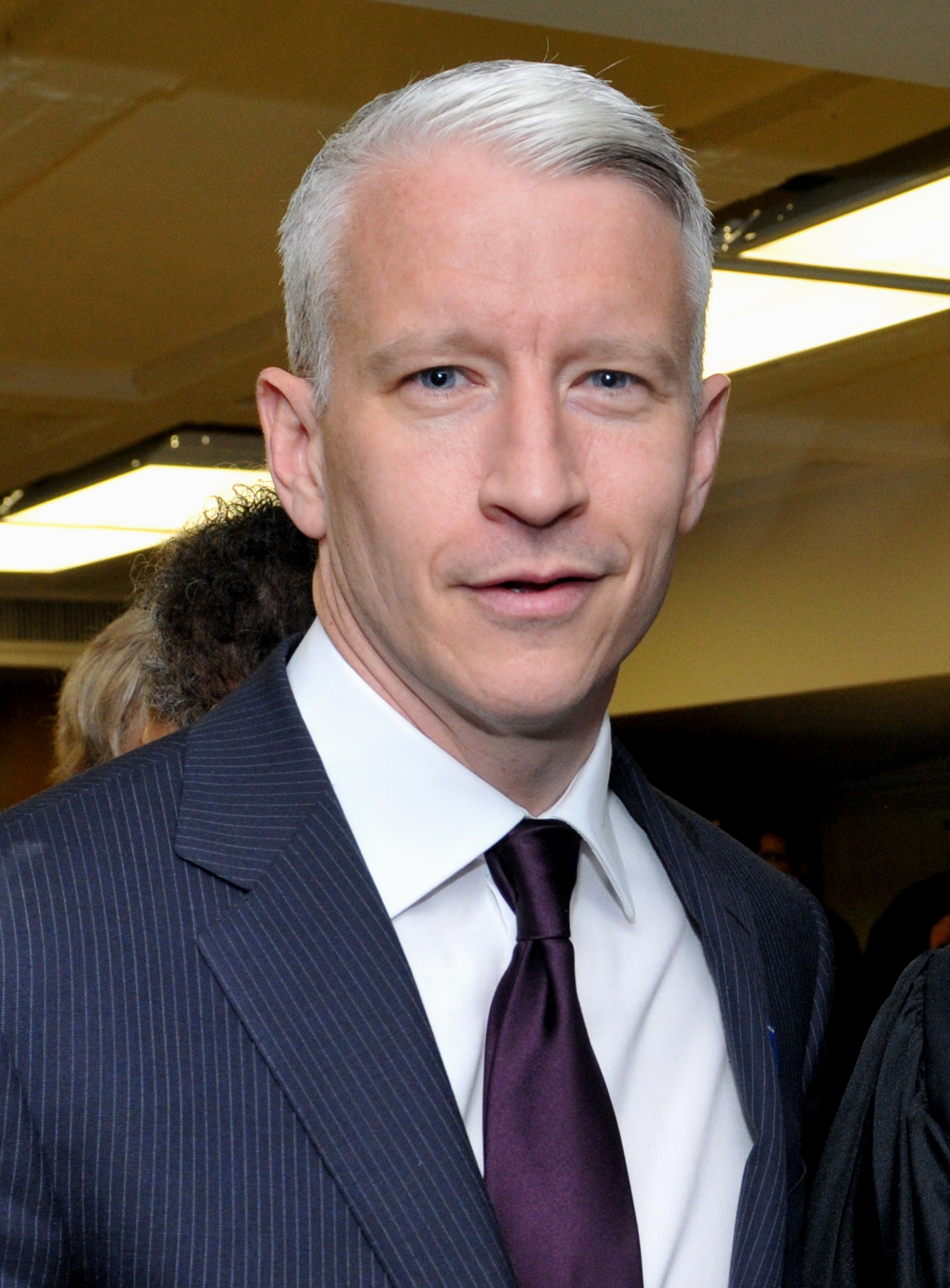
Anderson Cooper

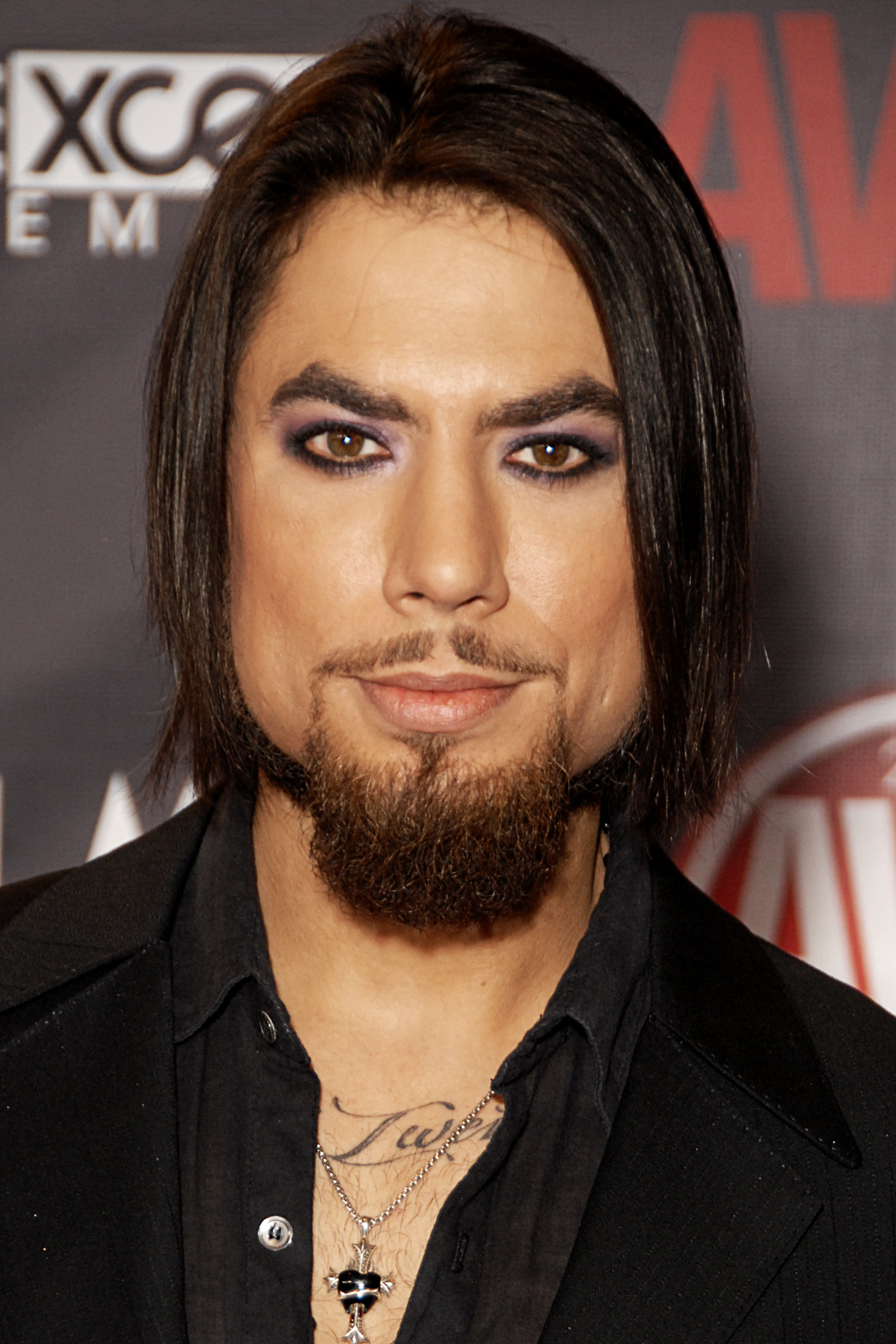
Dave Navarro

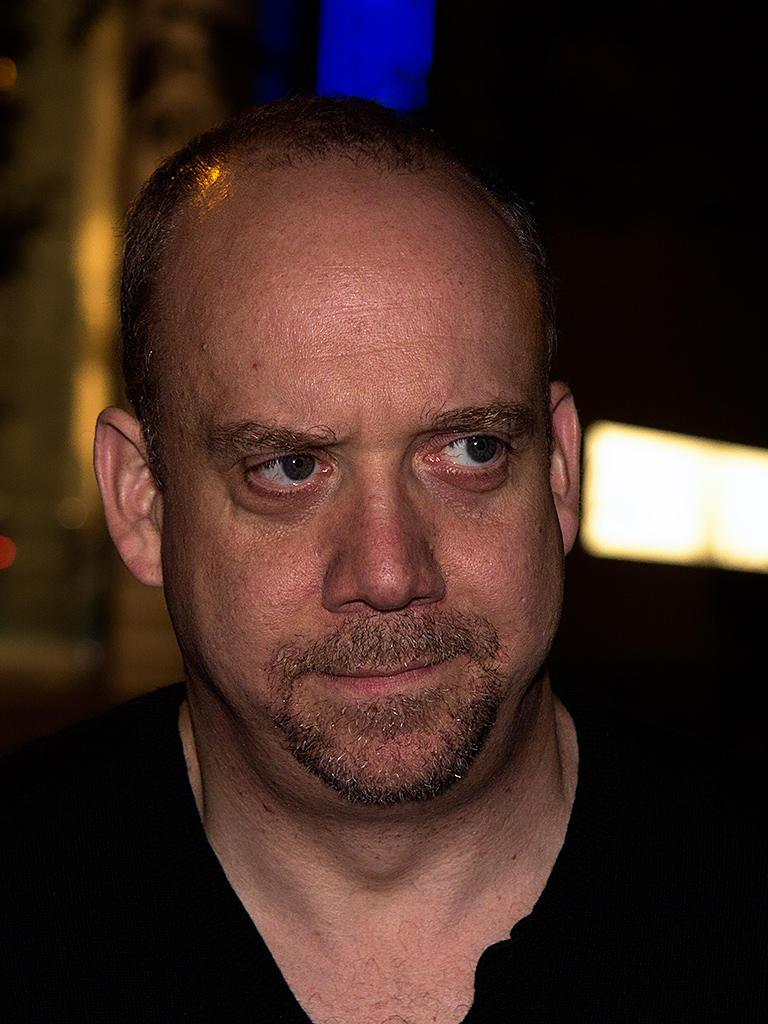
Paul Giamatti

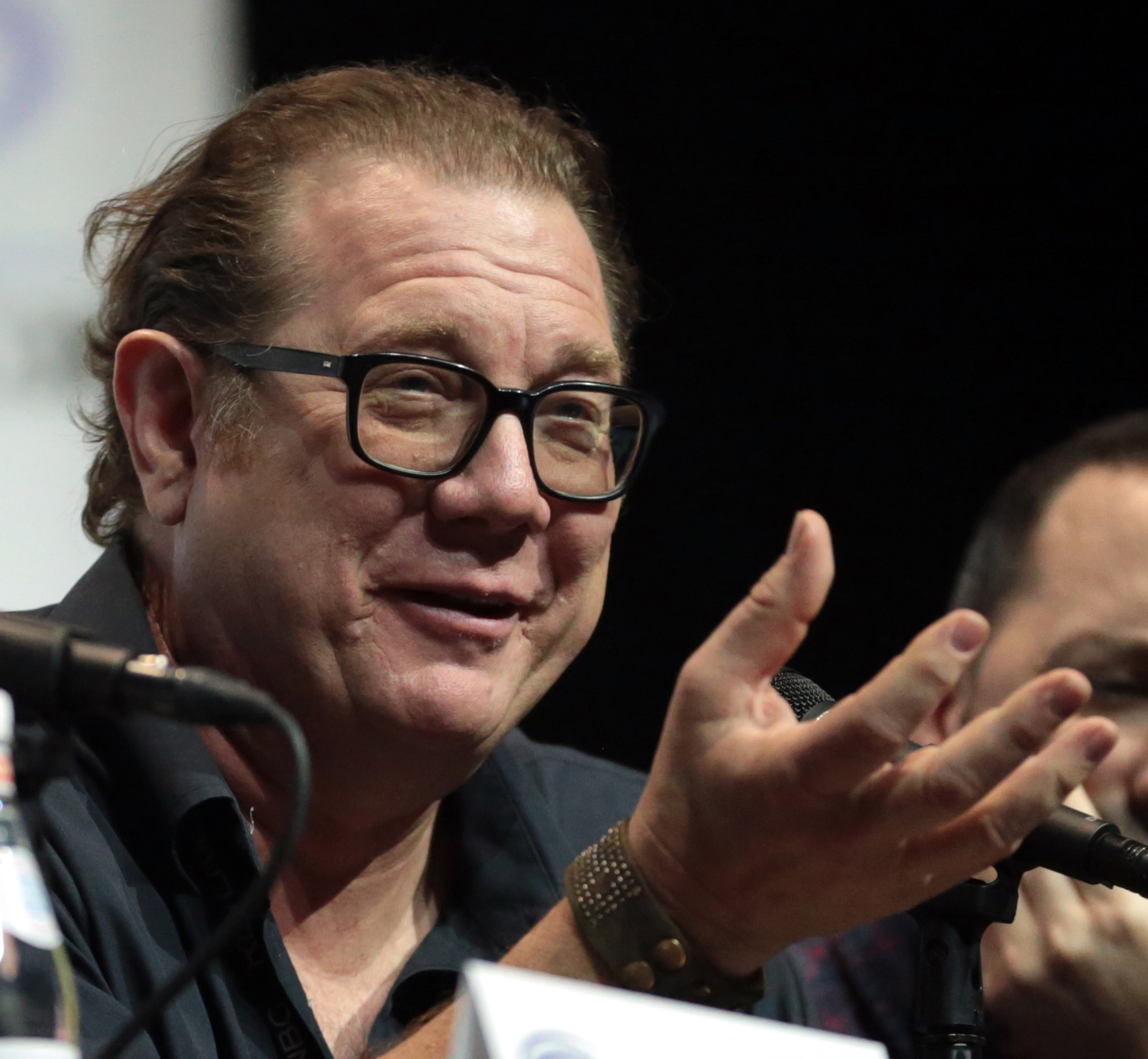
Fred Tatasciore

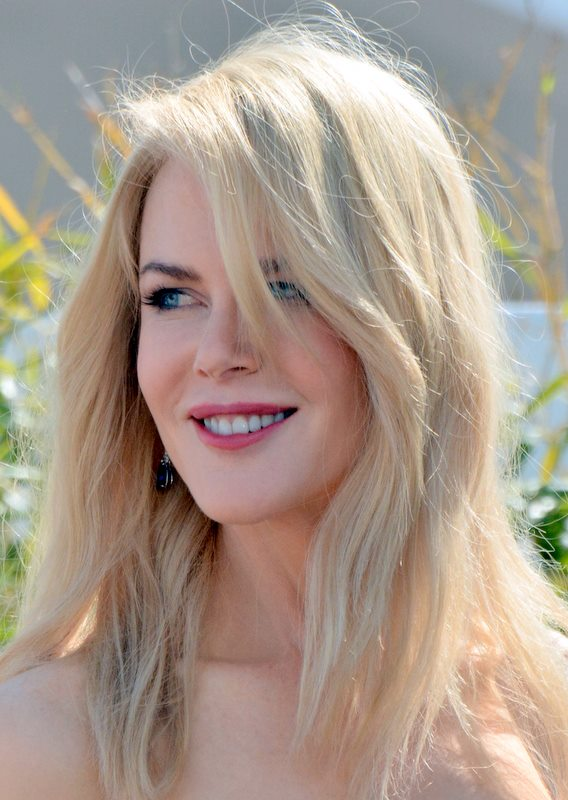
Nicole Kidman

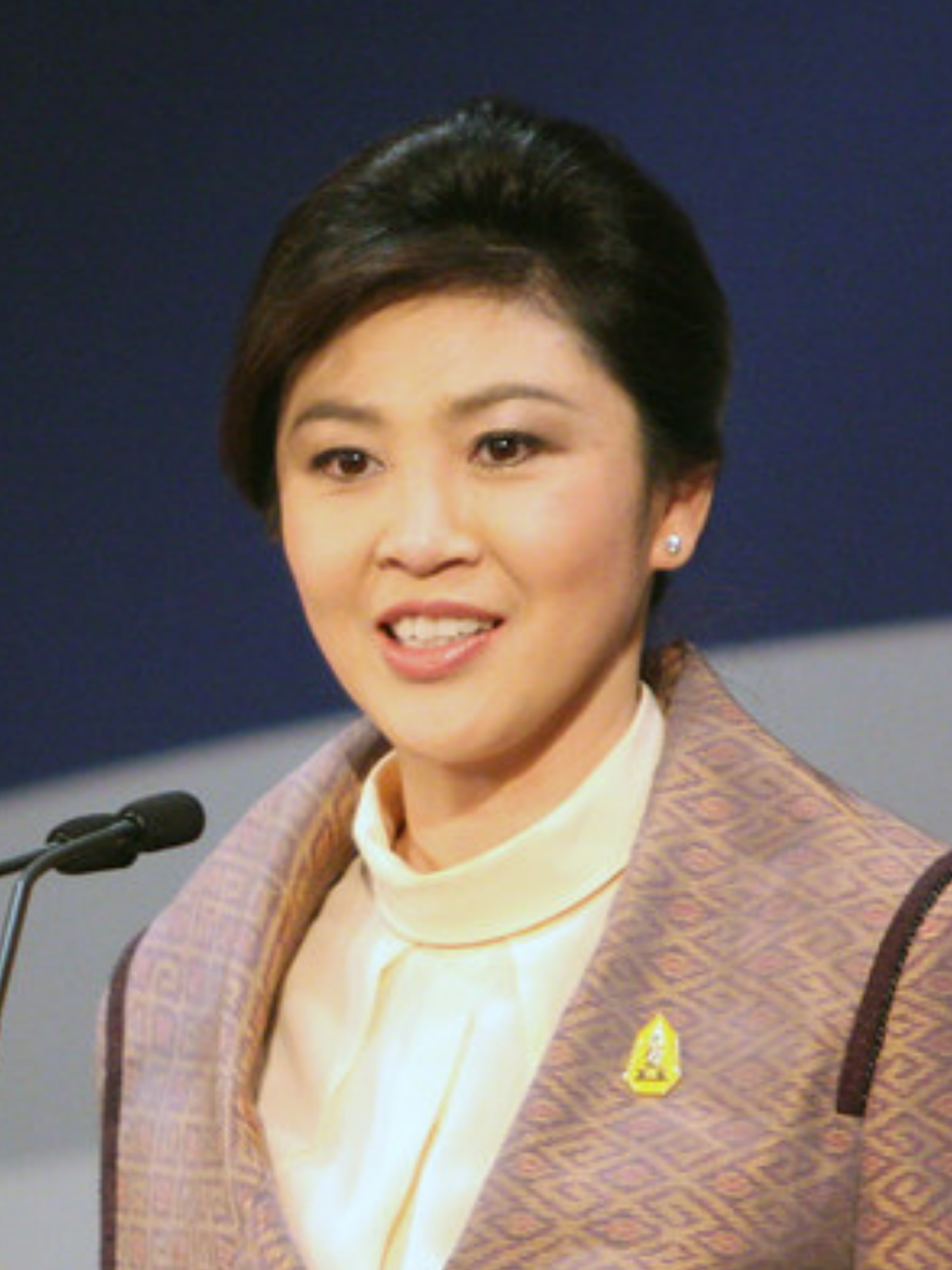
Yingluck Shinawatra

- June 1 – Roger Sanchez, American DJ
- June 3
  - Anderson Cooper, American television journalist
  - Tamás Darnyi, Hungarian swimmer
  - Christopher Walker, Gibraltarian triathlete and cyclist
- June 5
  - Joe DeLoach, American athlete
  - Ron Livingston, American actor
- June 6
  - Max Casella, American actor
  - Tristan Gemmill, English actor
  - Paul Giamatti, American actor
- June 7
  - Olli Mustonen, Finnish pianist and composer
  - Dave Navarro, American guitarist and singer (Jane's Addiction, Red Hot Chili Peppers)
- June 8
  - Efan Ekoku, Nigerian footballer
  - Jasmin Tabatabai, German/Iranian actress and musician
- June 9
  - Jian Ghomeshi, Canadian radio personality and musician
  - Rubén Maza, Venezuelan long-distance runner
- June 10 – Elizabeth Wettlaufer, Canadian nurse and serial killer
- June 15 – Fred Tatasciore, American voice actor
- June 16
  - Jürgen Klopp, German former footballer and former manager of Liverpool F.C.
  - Ike Shorunmu, Nigerian football goalkeeper
- June 19
  - Bjørn Dæhlie, Norwegian Olympic skier
  - Mia Sara, American actress
- June 20 – Nicole Kidman, American-born Australian actress
- June 21 – Yingluck Shinawatra, Thai politician, 28th Prime Minister of Thailand
- June 23 – Yoko Minamino, Japanese Idol star and actress
- June 24 – Richard Kruspe, German rock musician (Rammstein)
- June 26
  - Kaori Asoh, Japanese voice actress and singer
  - Luisito Espinosa, Filipino boxer
- June 28 – Lars Riedel, German Olympic athlete
- June 29
  - Carl Hester, British dressage rider
  - Melora Hardin, American actress and singer
- June 30
  - Quốc Bảo, Vietnamese songwriter and record producer
  - Sture Fladmark, Norwegian football manager and player
  - Robert Więckiewicz, Polish film and television actor

=== July ===
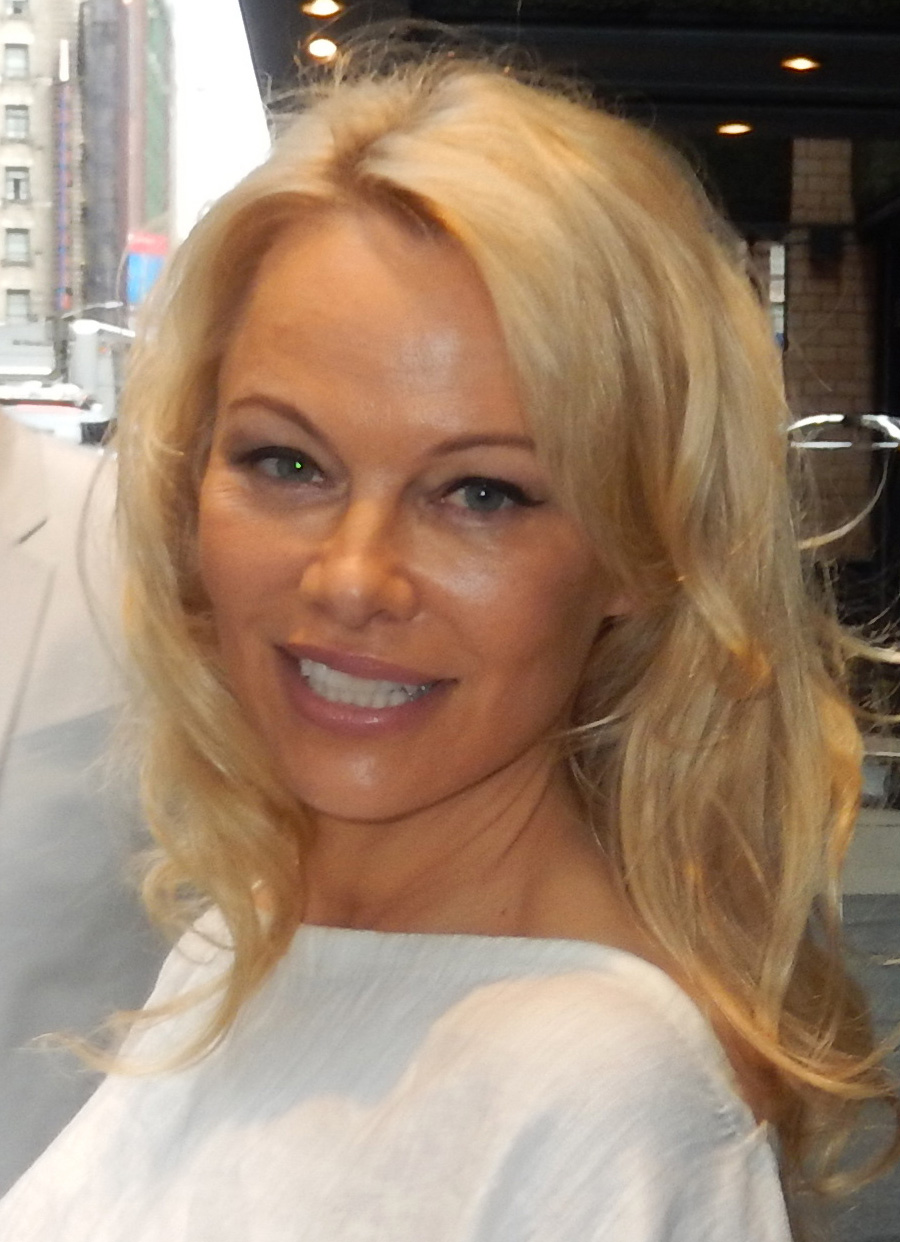
Pamela Anderson

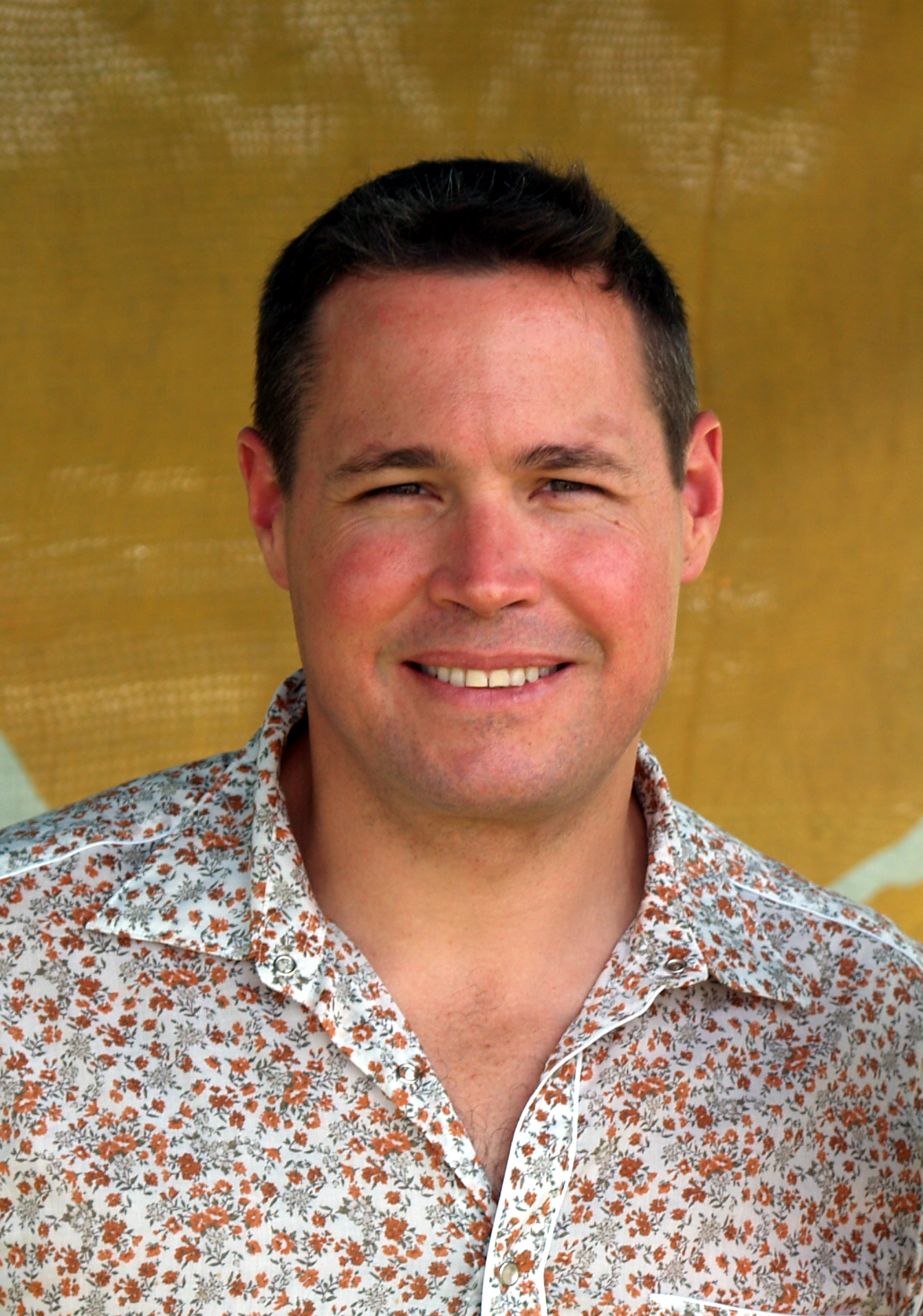
Jeff Corwin

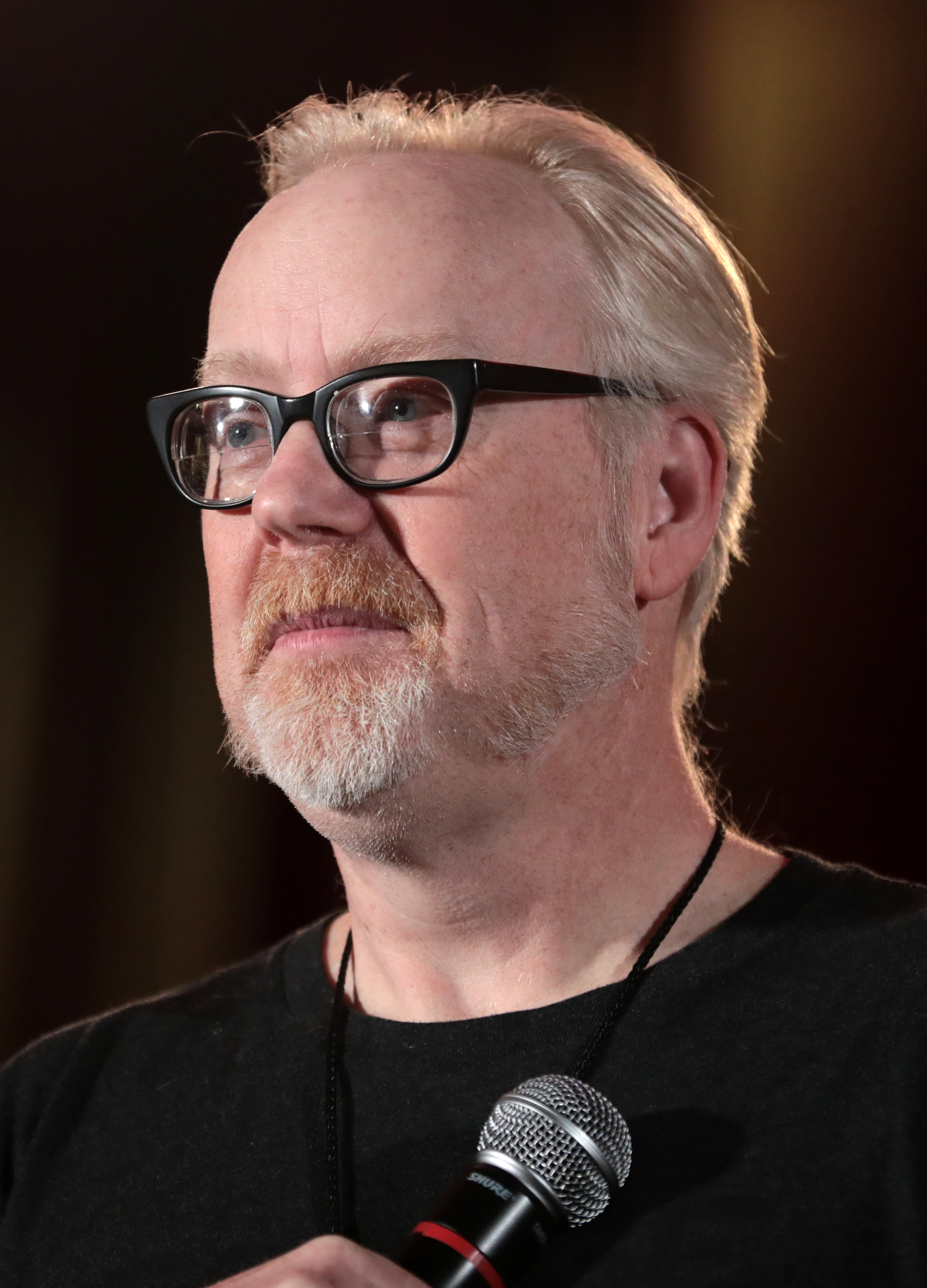
Adam Savage

- July 1
  - Pamela Anderson, Canadian actress and model
  - Luca Bottale, Italian voice actor
  - Ritchie Coster, English film, television, and theatre actor
  - Kim Komando, American talk radio program host
  - Peter Plate, German musician, singer, songwriter and record producer
- July 2
  - Maïtena Biraben, French-Swiss television presenter and producer
  - Paul Wekesa, Kenyan tennis player
- July 5
  - Mustafa Al-Kadhimi, Iraqi politician, Prime Minister of Iraq
  - Silvia Ziche, Italian comics artist
- July 6
  - Wendell Lawrence, Bahamian triple jumper
  - Heather Nova, Bermudian singer-songwriter
- July 7 – Tom Kristensen, Danish racing driver
- July 8 – Jordan Chan, Hong Kong singer and actor
- July 11 – Jhumpa Lahiri, British-born Indian-American author
- July 12 – John Petrucci, American musician
- July 13
  - Benny Benassi, Italian DJ, record producer and remixer
  - Akira Hokuto, Japanese women's professional wrestler
- July 14 – Valérie Pécresse, French politician
- July 15
  - Adam Savage, American TV show host
  - Michael Tse, Hong Kong actor
- July 16
  - Will Ferrell, American actor, comedian, and screenwriter
  - Mihaela Stanulet, Romanian artistic gymnast
- July 17 – Regina Lund, Swedish actress and singer
- July 18 – Vin Diesel, American actor and film producer
- July 19 – Lee Hsing-wen, Taiwanese actor
- July 20 – Reed Diamond, American actor
- July 22
  - Irene Bedard, American actress
  - Rhys Ifans, Welsh actor and musician
- July 23 – Philip Seymour Hoffman, American actor, director, and producer (d. 2014)
- July 25
  - Matt LeBlanc, American actor
  - Wendy Raquel Robinson, American actress
  - Margarita Zavala, Mexican lawyer and politician, First Lady of Mexico
- July 26 – Jason Statham, English actor, martial artist, and former diver
- July 28
  - Jakob Augstein, German journalist and publisher
  - Taka Hirose, Japanese musician (Feeder)
- July 30
  - Marisol Espinoza, Peruvian politician, 1st Vice President of Peru
  - A. W. Yrjänä, Finnish rock musician and poet
- July 31
  - Rodney Harvey, American actor and model (d. 1998)
  - Minako Honda, Japanese singer and musical actress (d. 2005)
  - Elizabeth Wurtzel, author and feminist (d. 2020)

=== August ===
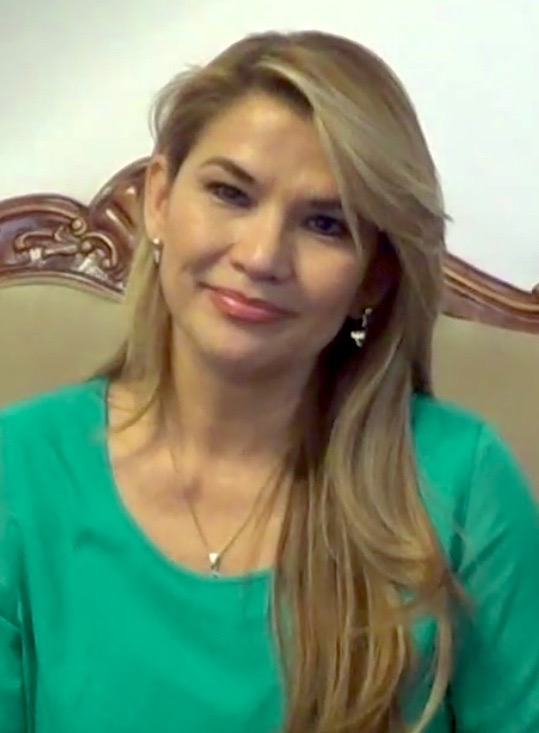
Jeanine Áñez

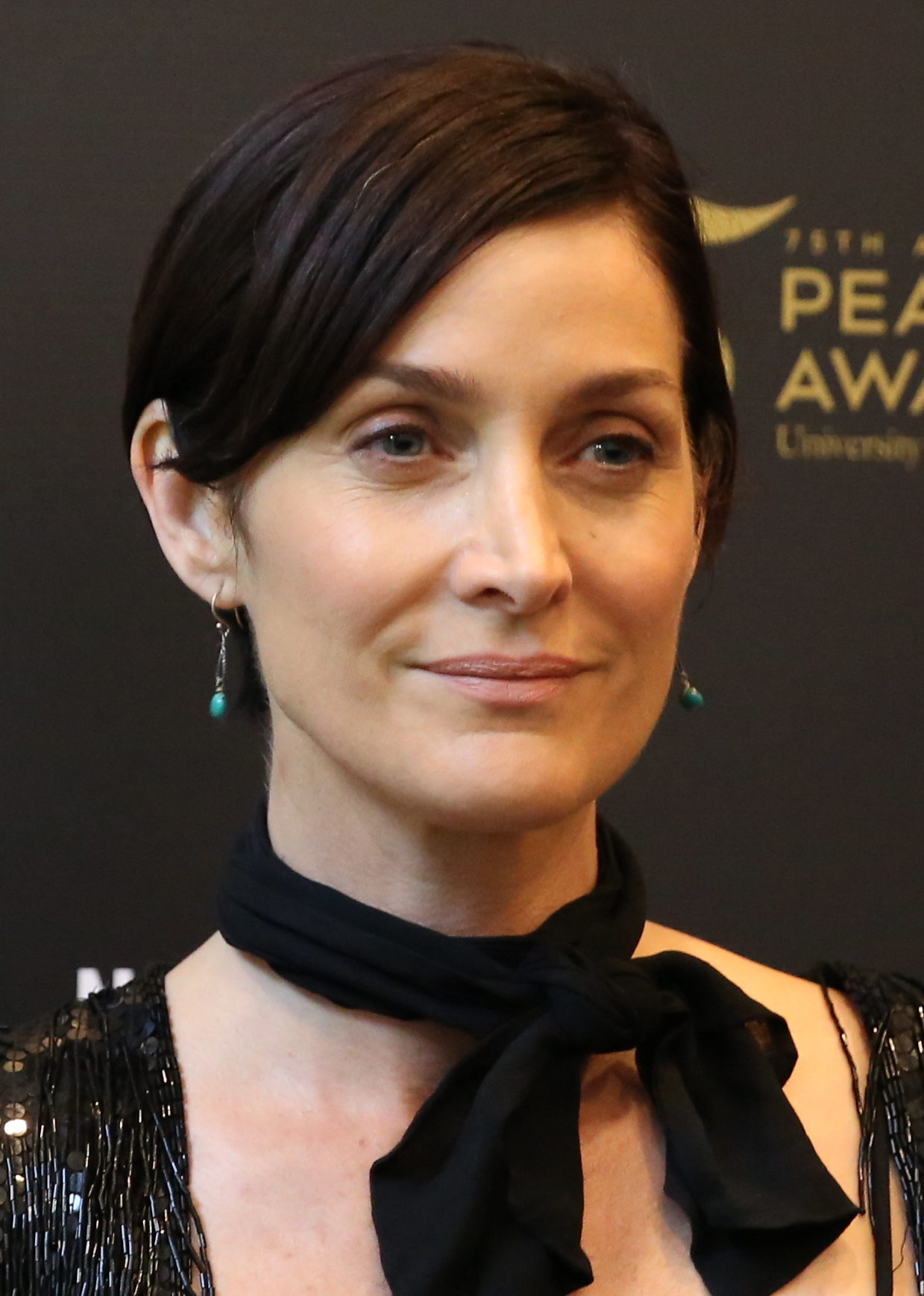
Carrie-Anne Moss

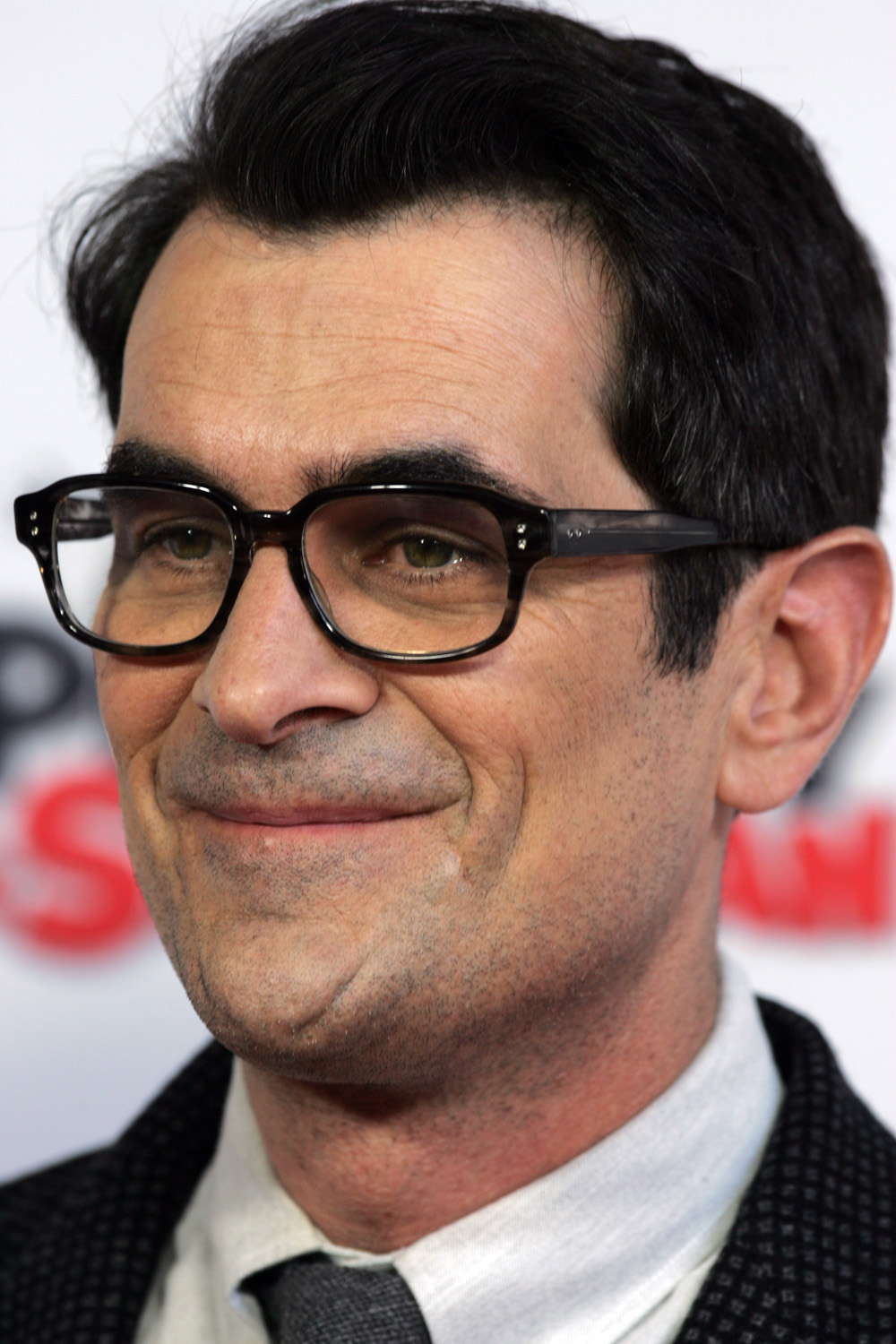
Ty Burrell

- August 2 – Aaron Krickstein, American tennis player
- August 3
  - Mathieu Kassovitz, French movie director and actor
  - Ida Mahmudah, Indonesian politician
- August 4 – Arbaaz Khan, Indian actor
- August 5
  - Vladyslav Gorai, Ukrainian tenor
  - Patrick Baumann, Swiss basketball executive and player and coach (d. 2018)
- August 7 – Charlotte Lewis, English actress
- August 8
  - Yūki Amami, Japanese actress
  - Sable, American wrestler, model and actress
- August 9 – Deion Sanders, American pro football and baseball player
- August 10 – Riddick Bowe, American boxer
- August 11 – Enrique Bunbury, Spanish singer-songwriter
- August 12
  - Andy Hui, Hong Kong singer and actor
  - Emil Kostadinov, Bulgarian footballer
  - Regilio Tuur, Dutch boxer
- August 13
  - Amélie Nothomb, Belgian writer
  - Jeanine Áñez, President of Bolivia
- August 15 – Brahim Boutayeb, Moroccan long-distance runner
- August 16
  - Mark Coyne, Australian rugby league player
  - Ulrika Jonsson, Swedish-born television personality
- August 18 – Daler Mehndi, Indian singer
- August 19 – Satya Nadella, Indian-American businessman and current CEO of Microsoft
- August 21
  - Carrie-Anne Moss, Canadian actress
  - Serj Tankian, Lebanese-born singer (System of a Down)
- August 22
  - Adewale Akinnuoye-Agbaje, Nigerian-British actor and model
  - Ty Burrell, American actor and comedian
  - Yukiko Okada, Japanese idol singer (d. 1986)
- August 25
  - Tom Hollander, English actor
  - Eckart von Hirschhausen, German physician and comedian
- August 28 – Masaaki Endoh, Japanese singer
- August 29
  - Neil Gorsuch, Associate Justice of the U.S. Supreme Court since 2017
  - Anton Newcombe, American musician (The Brian Jonestown Massacre)
- August 30 – Frederique van der Wal, Dutch supermodel

=== September ===
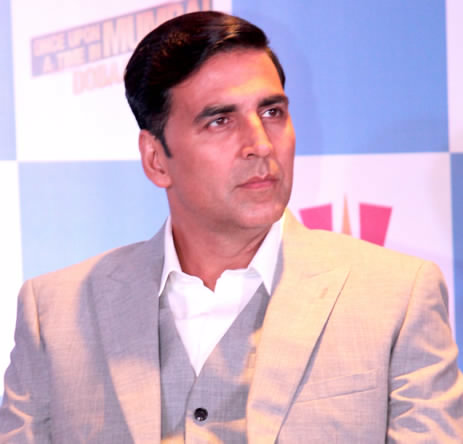
Akshay Kumar

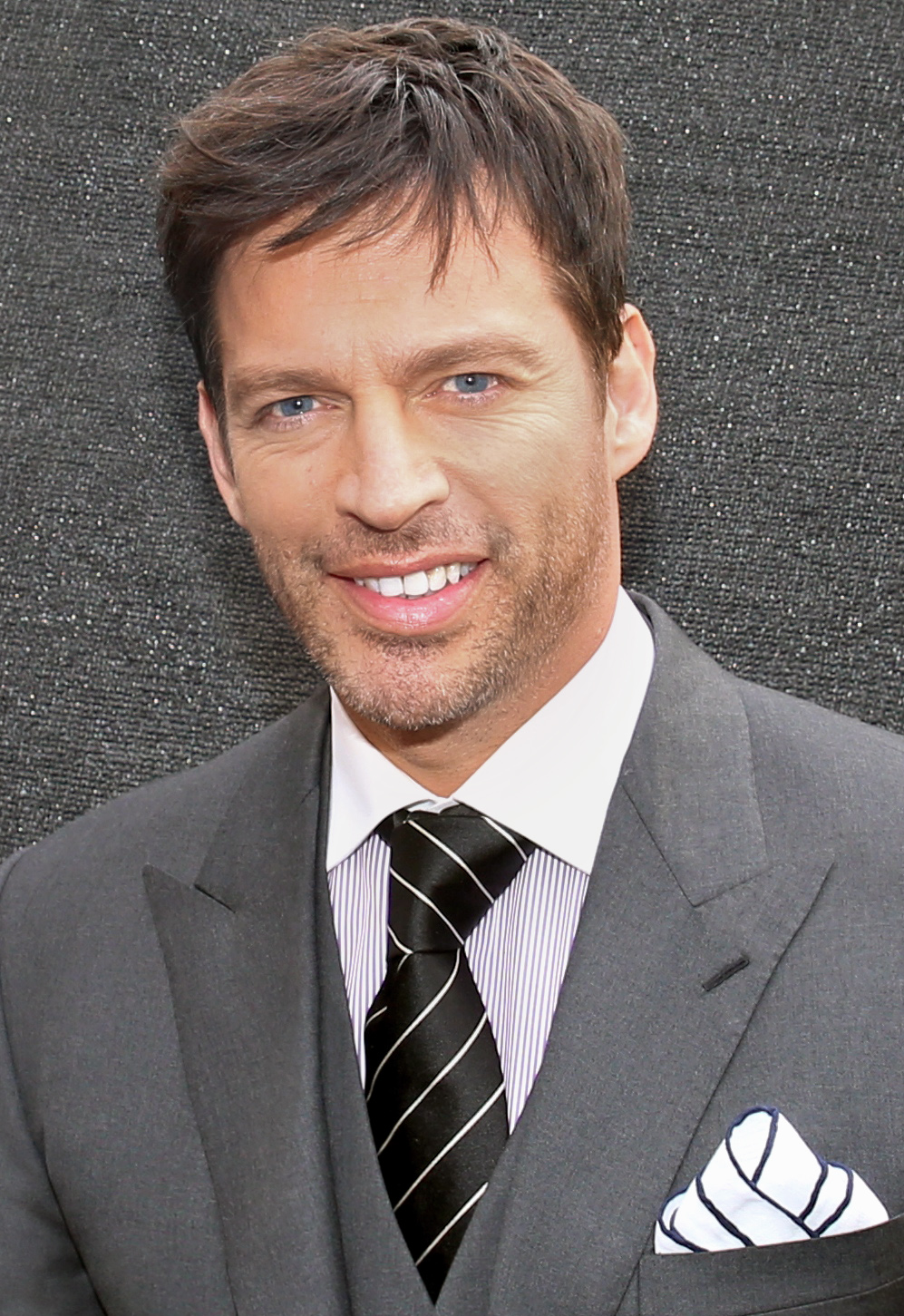
Harry Connick Jr.

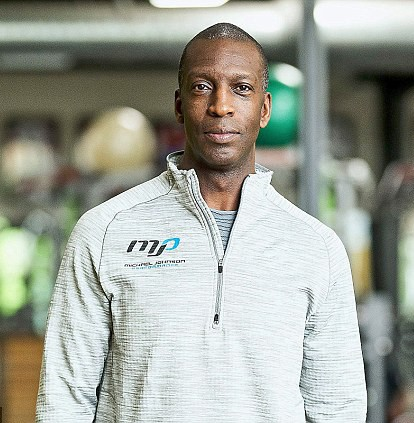
Michael Johnson

- September 3
  - Daron Acemoglu, Turkish-born economist
  - Drena De Niro, American actress
  - Luis Gonzalez, American baseball player
- September 5
  - Kōichi Morishita, Japanese long-distance runner
  - Arnel Pineda, Filipino singer-songwriter (Journey)
  - Matthias Sammer, German football player
  - Jane Sixsmith, English field hockey player
- September 6 – Macy Gray, African-American urban musician
- September 9 – Akshay Kumar, Indian actor
- September 11 – Harry Connick Jr., American singer and actor
- September 12
  - Louis C.K., American comedian and actor
  - Rob Renzetti, American animator and director
- September 13
  - Michael Johnson, American sprinter
  - Tim "Ripper" Owens, American rock singer (Judas Priest, Iced Earth, Yngwie Malmsteen)
- September 16 – Alain Claude Bilie By Nze, Gabonese politician, 13th Prime Minister of Gabon
- September 18 – Tara Fitzgerald, British actress
- September 19 – Aleksandr Karelin, Russian Greco-Roman wrestler
- September 20 – Kristen Johnston, American actress
- September 21 – Faith Hill, American country singer
- September 22 – Félix Savón, Cuban boxer
- September 23
  - Masashi Nakayama, Japanese footballer
  - Jenna Stern, American actress
- September 25
  - Melissa De Sousa, American actress
  - Audrey Wasilewski, American actress and voice actress
- September 28
  - Mira Sorvino, American actress
  - Moon Zappa, American actress, musician and author
- September 30 – Andrea Roth, Canadian actress

=== October ===
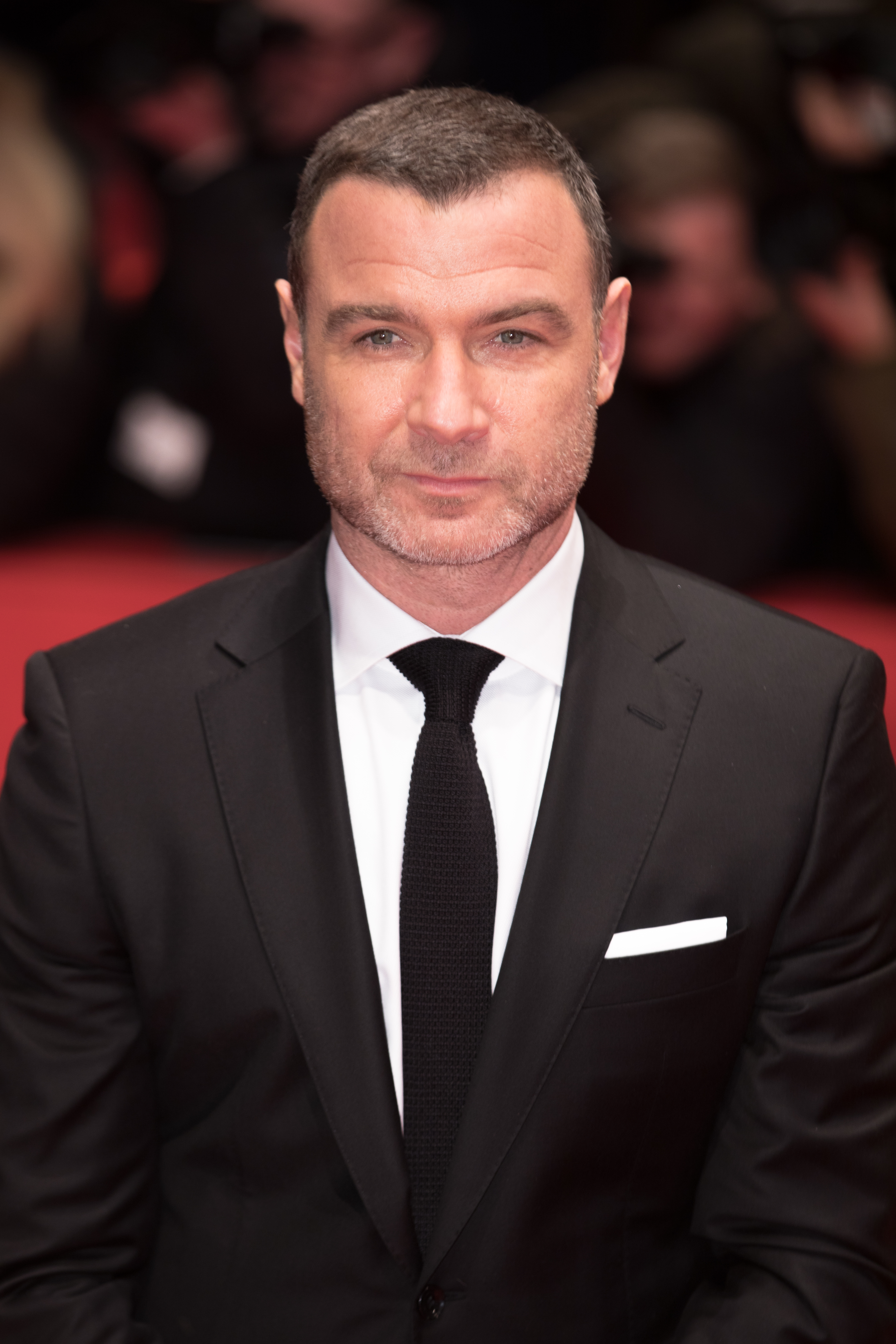
Liev Schreiber

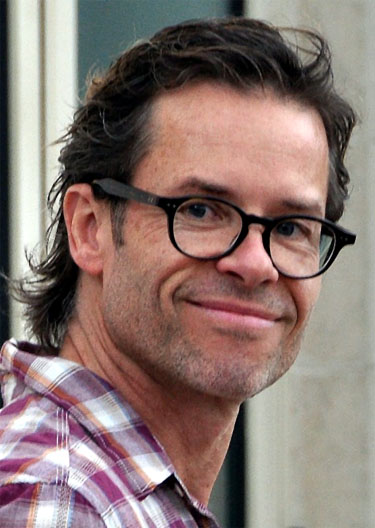
Guy Pearce

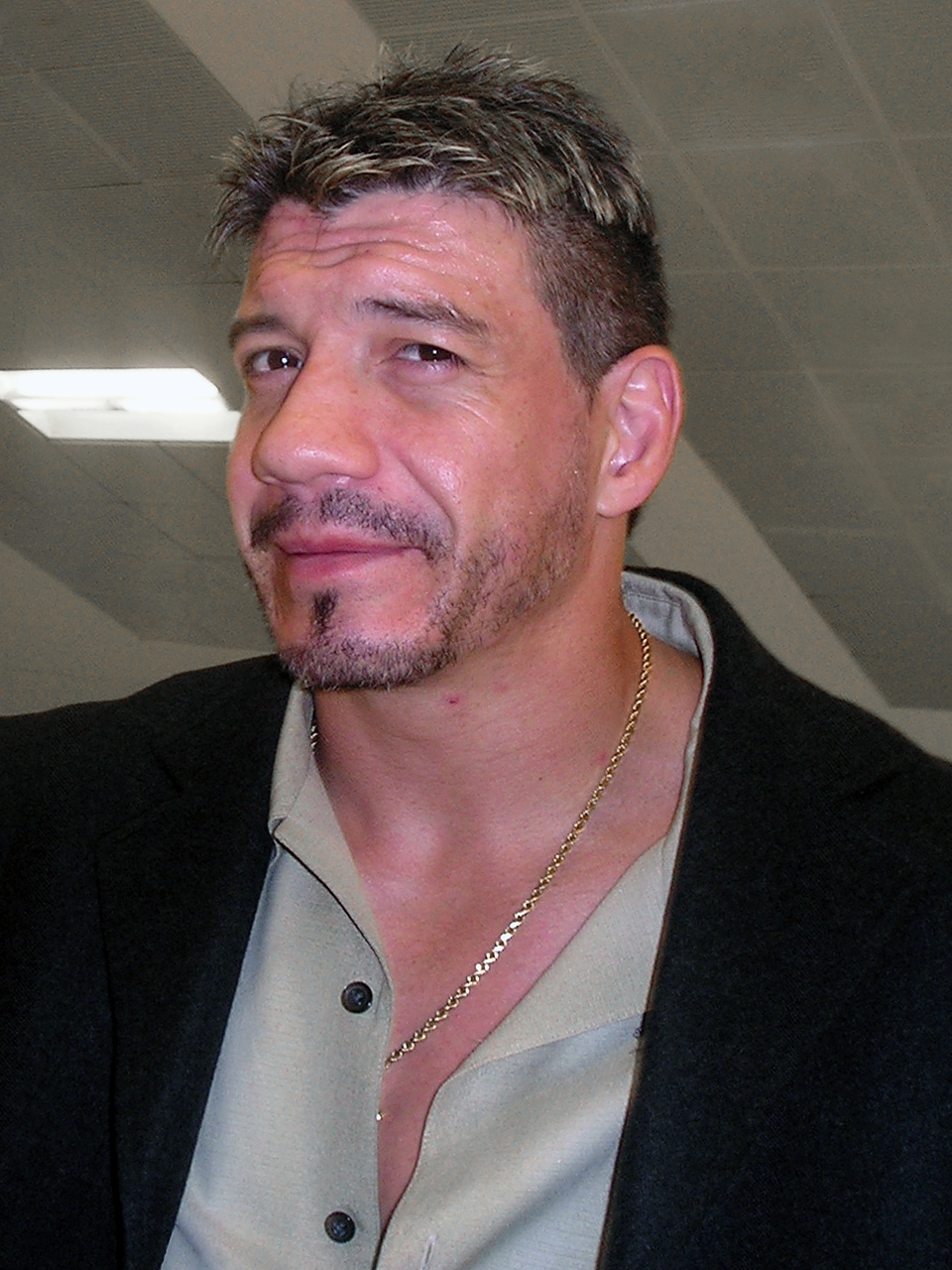
Eddie Guerrero

- October 2 – Frankie Fredericks, Namibian athlete
- October 3
  - Tiara Jacquelina, Malaysian actress
  - Rob Liefeld, American author and illustrator
  - Denis Villeneuve, Canadian film director and writer
- October 4 – Liev Schreiber, American actor and film director
- October 5 – Guy Pearce, English-born Australian actor
- October 6
  - Bruno Bichir, Mexican actor
  - Sergi López Segú, Spanish footballer (d. 2006)
- October 7
  - Toni Braxton, American R&B singer
  - María Corina Machado, Venezuelan politician, winner of the Nobel Peace Prize
- October 9
  - Maurice Banach, German footballer (d. 1991)
  - Eddie Guerrero, Mexican-American professional wrestler (d. 2005)
- October 10
  - Michael Giacchino, American music composer
  - Gavin Newsom, American politician, 40th Governor of California
- October 11
  - Artie Lange, American actor, comedian and radio personality
  - Peter Thiel, German-American entrepreneur and venture capitalist
- October 13
  - Trevor Hoffman, American Major League Baseball player
  - Javier Sotomayor, Cuban high jumper
  - Kate Walsh, American actress
- October 17 – Nathalie Tauziat, French tennis player
- October 19 – Yōji Matsuda, Japanese actor and voice actor
- October 20
  - Kerrod Walters, Australian rugby league player
  - Kevin Walters, Australian rugby league player and coach
- October 22
  - Salvatore Di Vittorio, Italian composer-conductor
  - Ulrike Maier, Austrian alpine skier (d. 1994)
  - Carlos Mencia, Latino-American actor and standup comedian
- October 24 – Jacqueline McKenzie, Australian actress
- October 27 – Scott Weiland, American musician (d. 2015)
- October 28
  - Julia Roberts, American actress
  - Sophie, Hereditary Princess of Liechtenstein
- October 29
  - Joely Fisher, American actress
  - Péter Kun, Hungarian guitarist (d. 1993)
  - Rufus Sewell, English actor
- October 31 – Vanilla Ice, American rapper

=== November ===
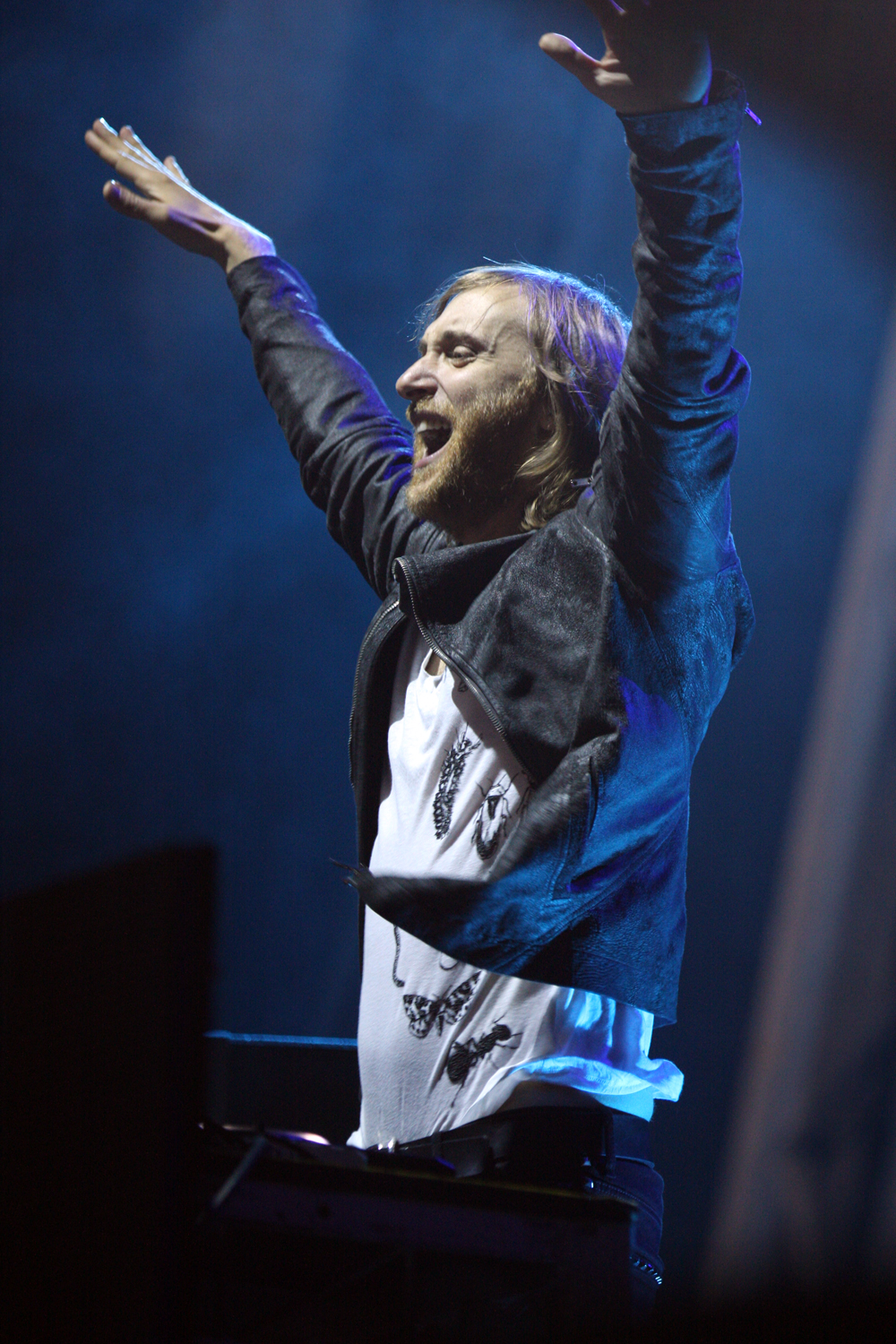
David Guetta

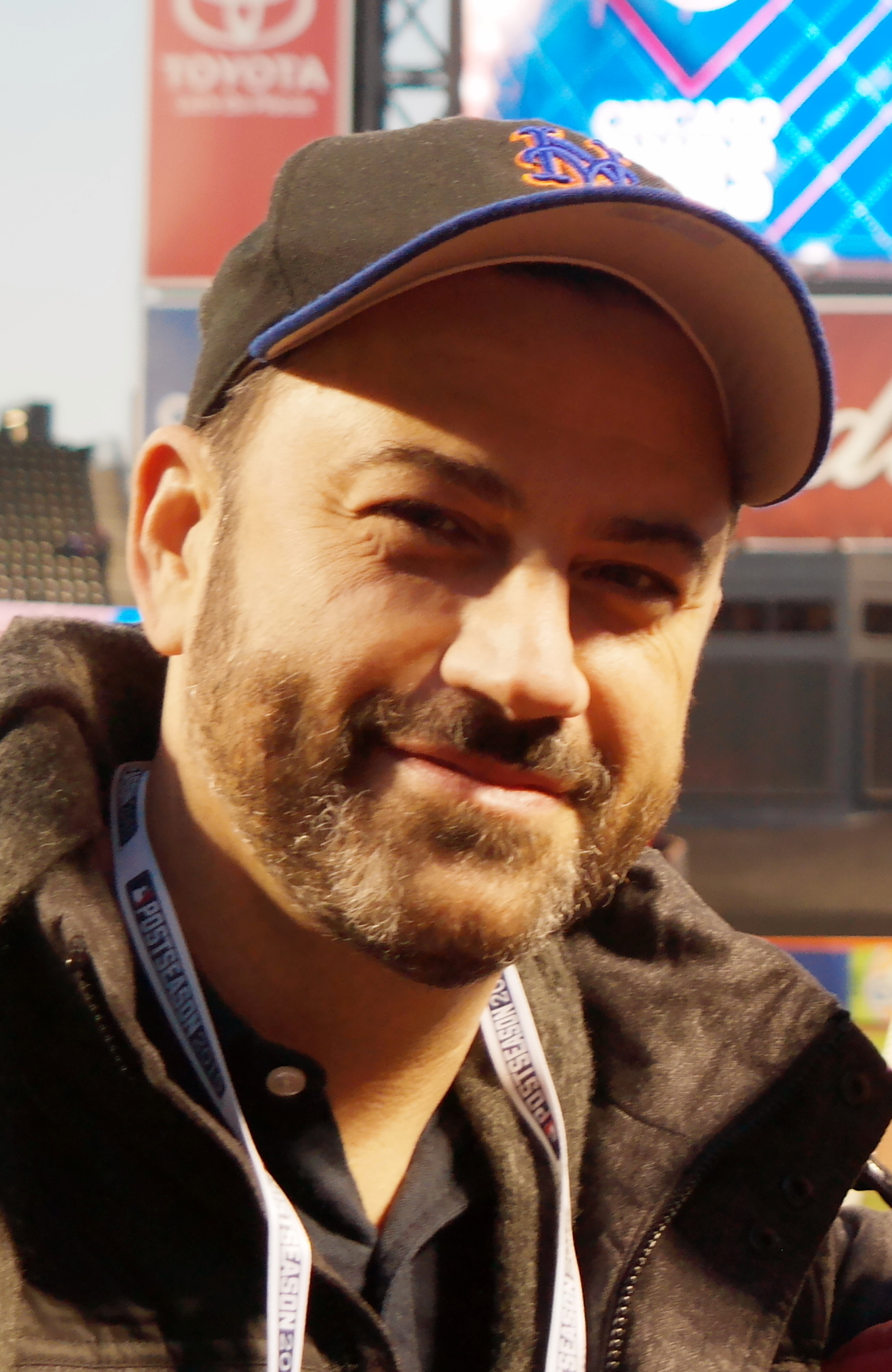
Jimmy Kimmel

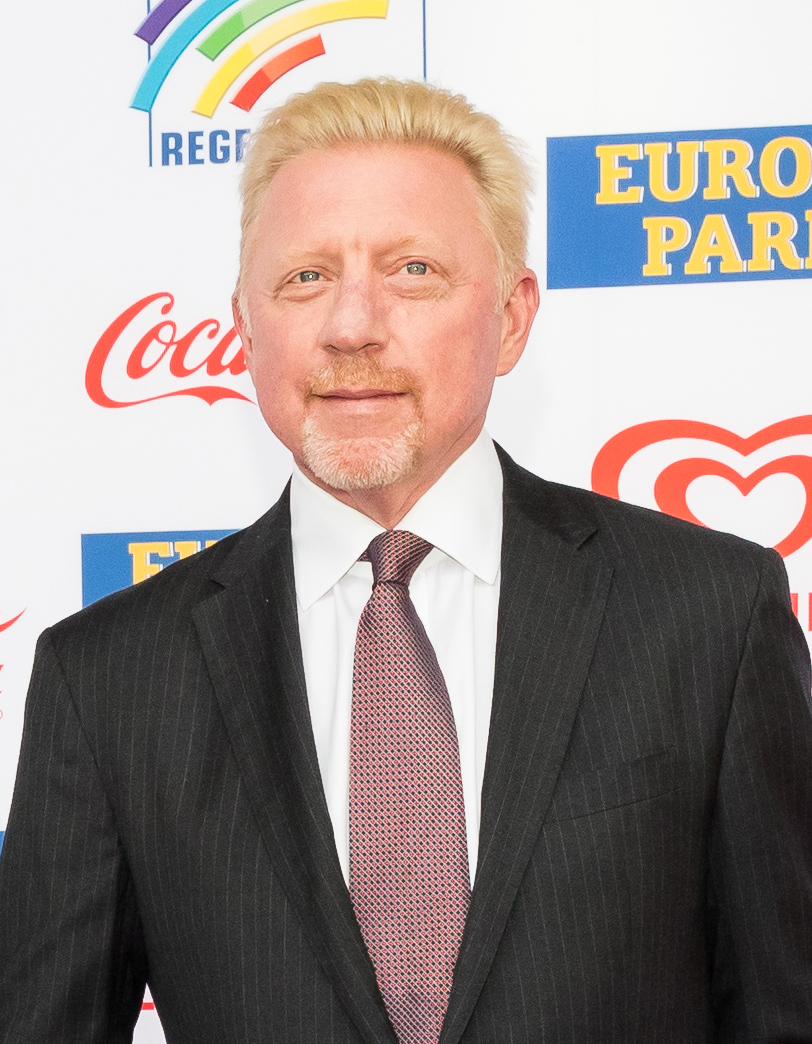
Boris Becker

- November 1 – Tina Arena, Australian singer-songwriter
- November 2 – Scott Walker, American legislator and politician; 45th Governor of Wisconsin (2011–2019)
- November 5 – Judy Reyes, American actress
- November 6
  - Pervin Buldan, Turkish-Kurdish politician
  - Rebecca Schaeffer, American actress (d. 1989)
- November 7
  - David Guetta, French DJ and record producer
  - Sharleen Spiteri, Scottish singer-songwriter
- November 8 – Courtney Thorne-Smith, American actress
- November 11 – Gil de Ferran, Brazilian race car driver (d. 2023)
- November 13
  - Juhi Chawla, Indian actress, model, and film producer
  - Jimmy Kimmel, American comedian and talk show host
- November 15 – François Ozon, French writer and director
- November 16 – Lisa Bonet, American actress
- November 20 – Teoman, Turkish rock singer and songwriter
- November 22
  - Boris Becker, German tennis player
  - Mark Ruffalo, American actor
  - Bart Veldkamp, Dutch-born speed skater
- November 23 – Salli Richardson, American actress
- November 25 – Anthony Nesty, Surinamese swimmer
- November 28 – Anna Nicole Smith, American model and actress (d. 2007)

=== December ===
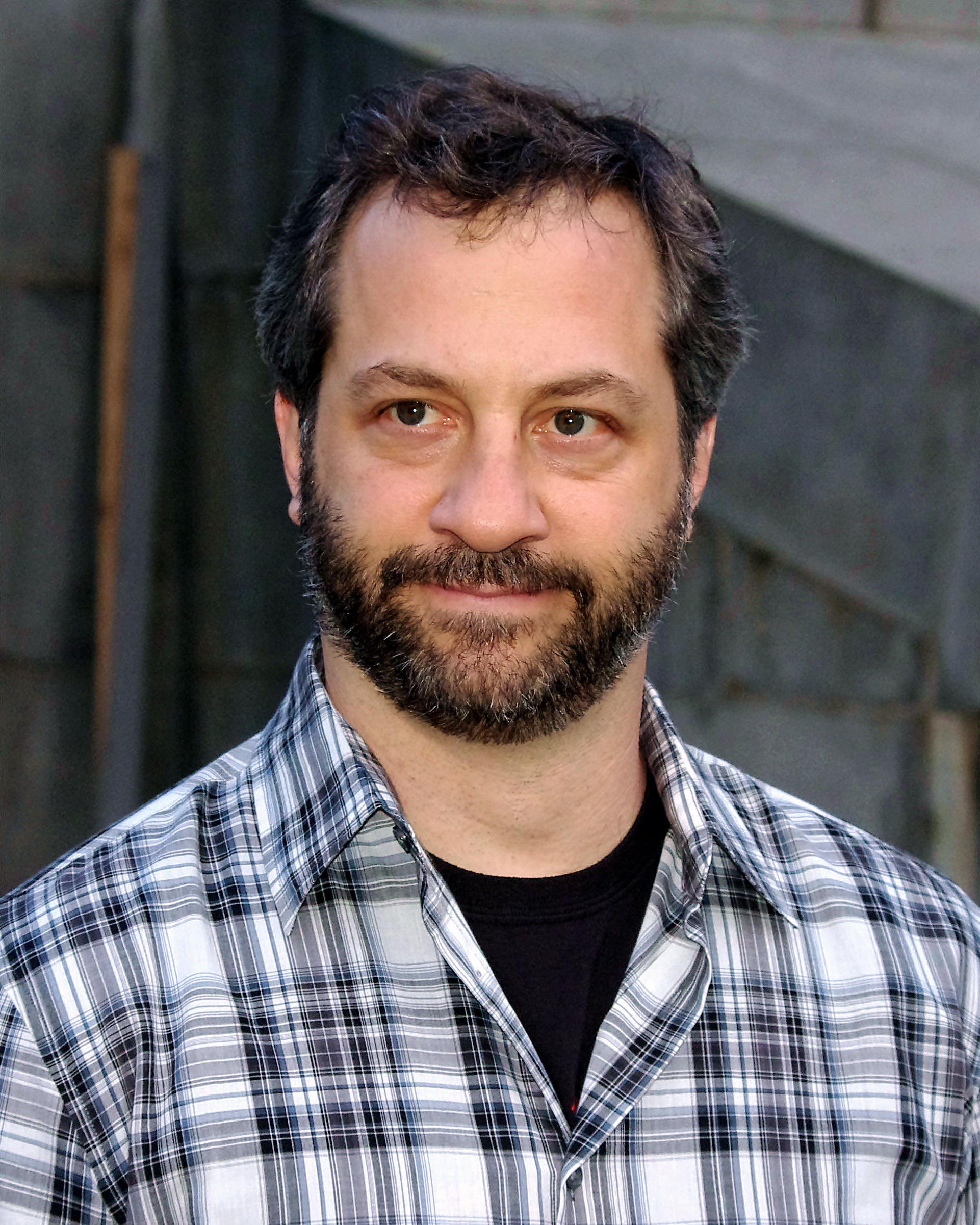
Judd Apatow

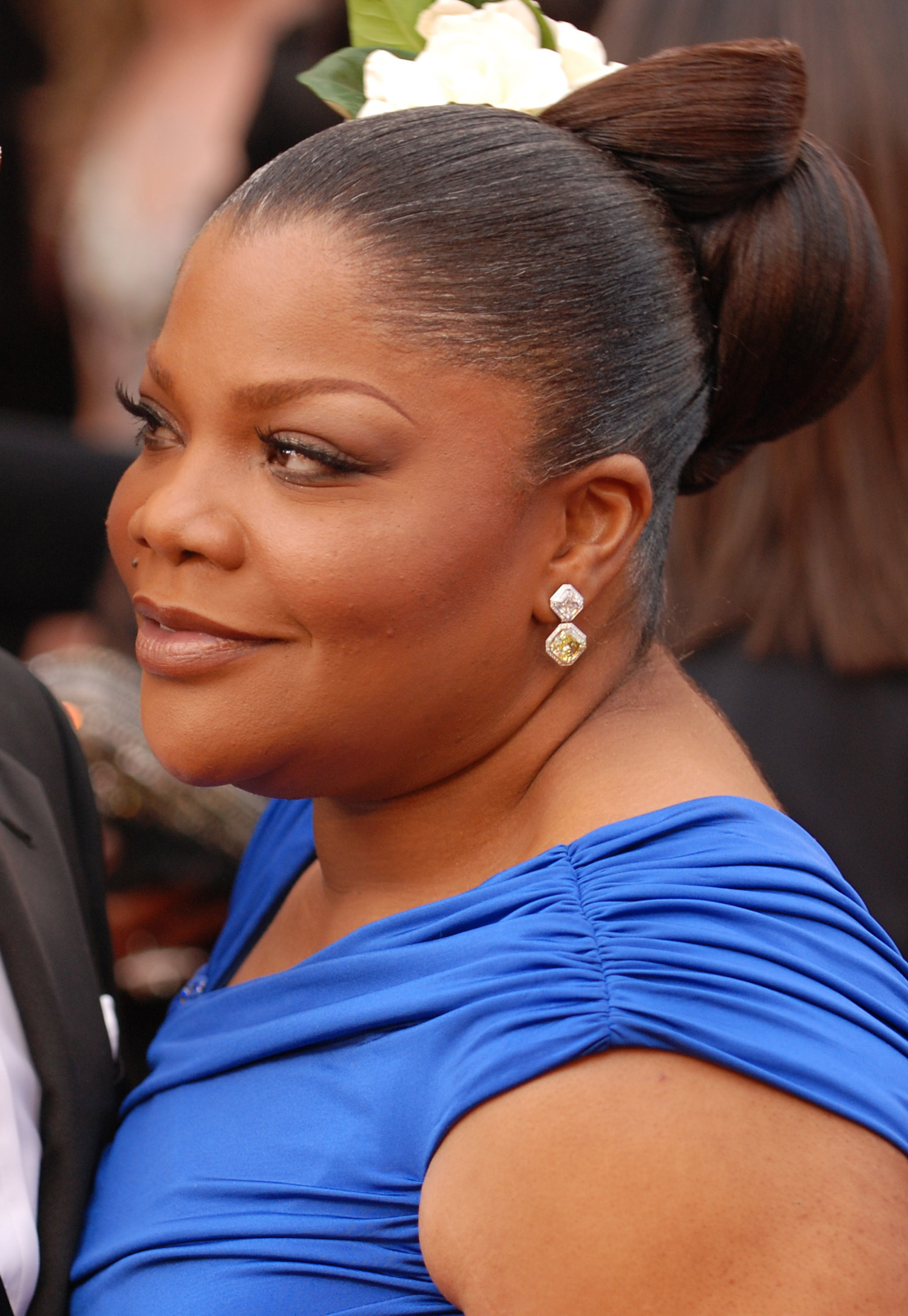
Mo'Nique

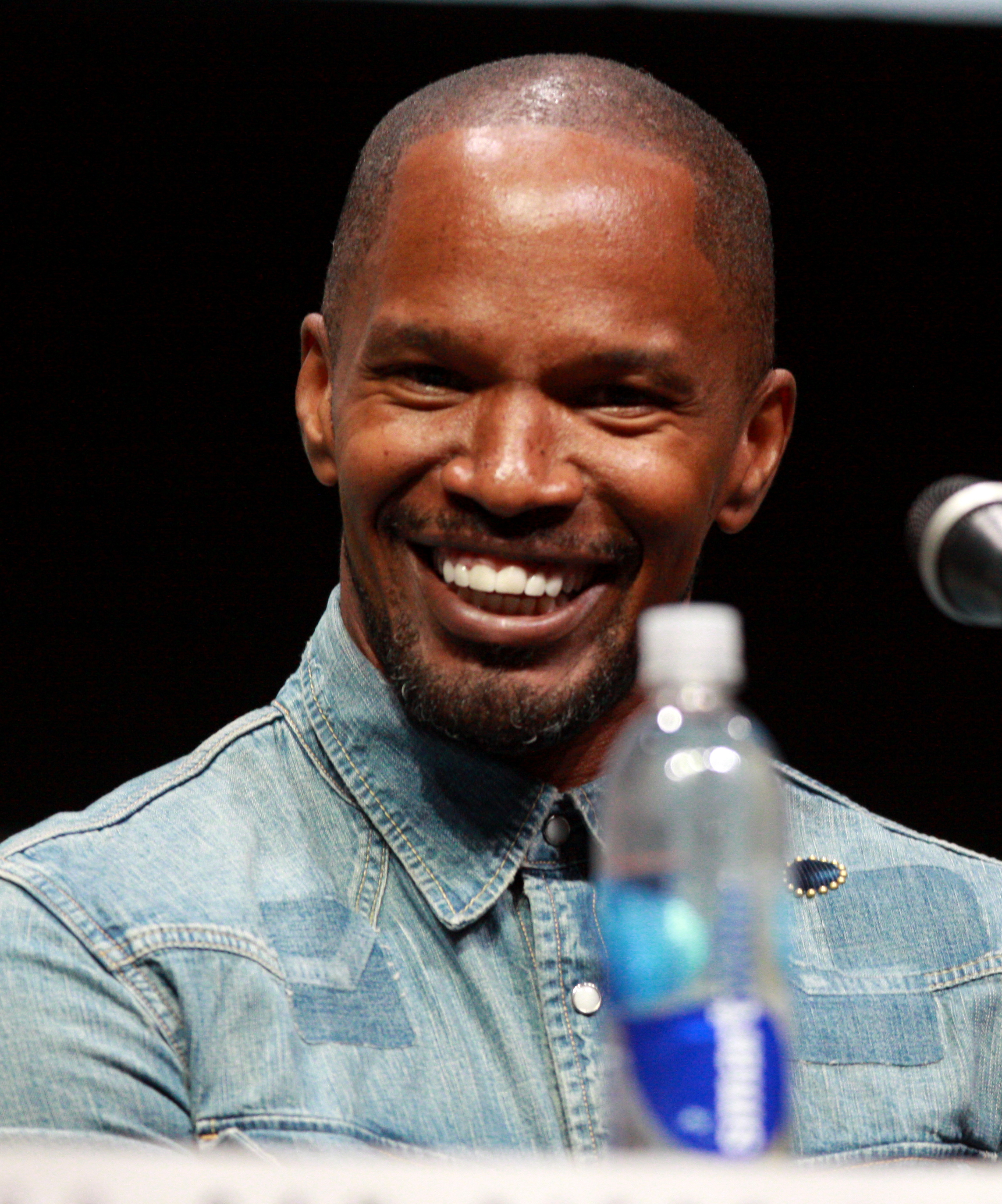
Jamie Foxx

- December 1 – Néstor Carbonell, American actor, director and screenwriter
- December 4 – Adamski, English dance music producer
- December 5 – Knez, Montenegrin singer
- December 6 – Judd Apatow, American screenwriter and producer
- December 9 – Joshua Bell, American violinist
- December 11 – Mo'Nique, African-American actress and comedian
- December 13 – Jamie Foxx, African-American actor and singer
- December 14 – Hanne Haugland, Norwegian high jumper
- December 16
  - Donovan Bailey, Canadian athlete
  - Miranda Otto, Australian actress
- December 17 – Gigi D'Agostino, Italian musician and DJ
- December 19
  - Criss Angel, American illusionist, escapologist and stunt performer
  - Charles Austin, American Olympic athlete
- December 21 – Mikheil Saakashvili, Georgian politician, 3rd President of Georgia and Governor of Odessa Oblast
- December 22
  - Richey Edwards, Welsh musician (d. 1995)
  - Dan Petrescu, Romanian footballer
- December 23 – Carla Bruni, Italian-French model, singer-songwriter and First Lady of France
- December 31 – Anura Karunathilake, Sri Lankan politician

== Deaths ==
=== January ===
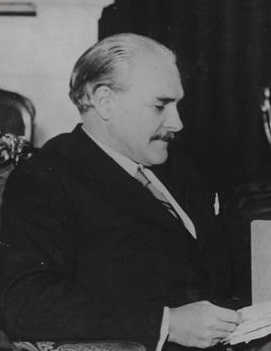
Miklós Kállay

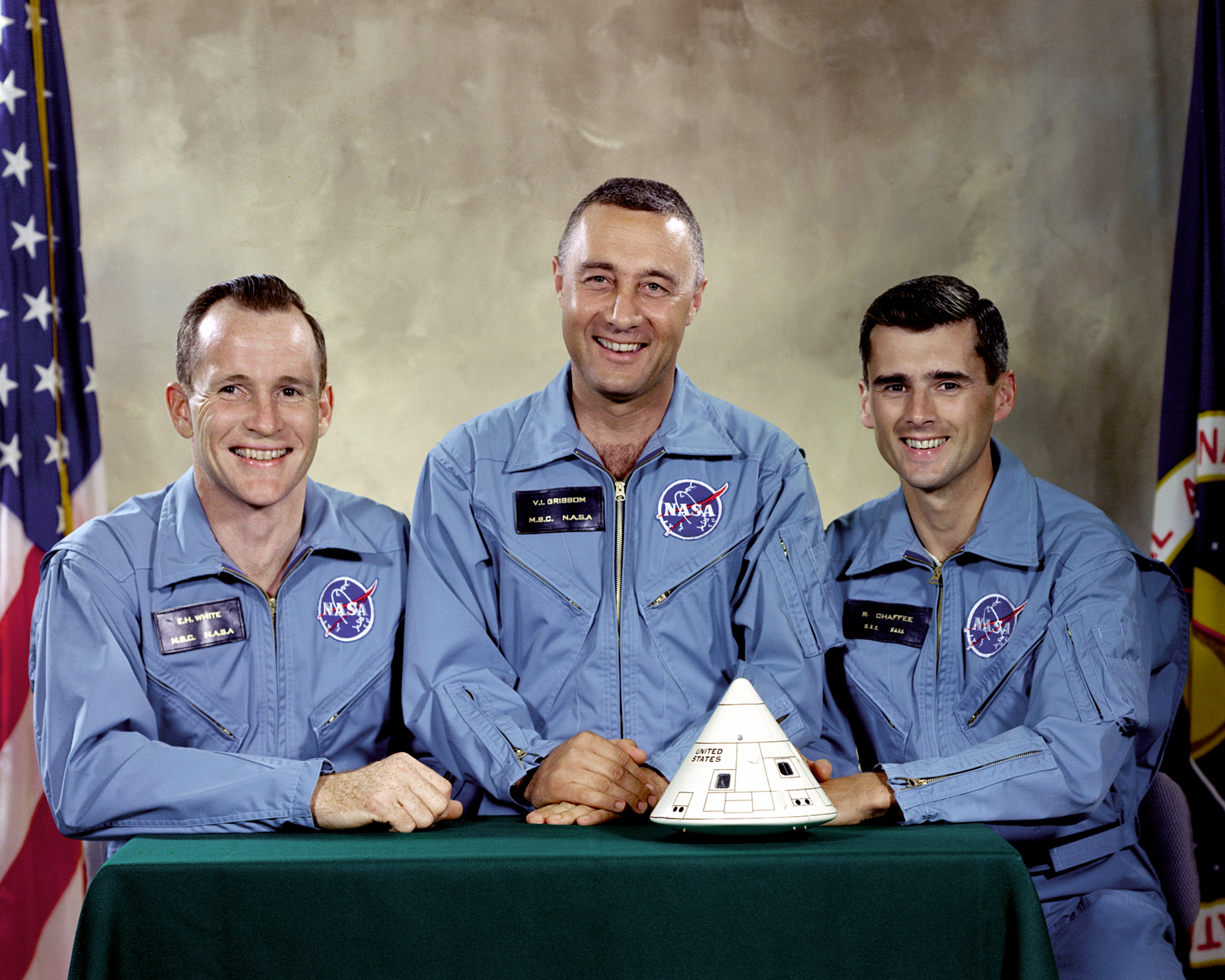
Apollo 1 crew

  - Mary Garden, Scottish-American opera singer (b. 1874)
  - Jack Ruby, American nightclub owner, best known as the killer of Lee Harvey Oswald (b. 1911)
- January 4 – Donald Campbell, English water and land speed record seeker (b. 1921)
- January 9 – Waldo Frank, American novelist and historian (b. 1889)
- January 12 – Holland Smith, American general (b. 1882)
- January 14 – Miklós Kállay, 34th Prime Minister of Hungary (b. 1887)
- January 17
  - Evelyn Nesbit, American actress and model (b. 1884)
  - Barney Ross, American boxer (b. 1909)
  - Al Sheehan, American entertainment businessman and radio host (b. 1899)
- January 21 – Ann Sheridan, American actress (b. 1915)
- January 23 – Holcombe Ward, American tennis player (b. 1878)
- January 24 – Luigi Federzoni, Italian Fascist politician (b. 1878)
- January 27
  - Crew of Apollo 1 (launch pad fire):
    - Ed White, American astronaut (b. 1930)
    - Gus Grissom, American astronaut (b. 1926)
    - Roger Chaffee, American astronaut (b. 1935)
  - David Maxwell Fyfe, 1st Earl of Kilmuir, British politician, lawyer, and judge (b. 1900)
  - Alphonse Juin, Marshal of France (b. 1888)
  - Luigi Tenco, Italian singer-songwriter (b. 1938)
- January 28 – Leonhard Seppala, Norwegian-American sled dog breeder, trainer and musher (b. 1877)
- January 30 – Eddie Tolan, American athlete (b. 1908)

=== February ===
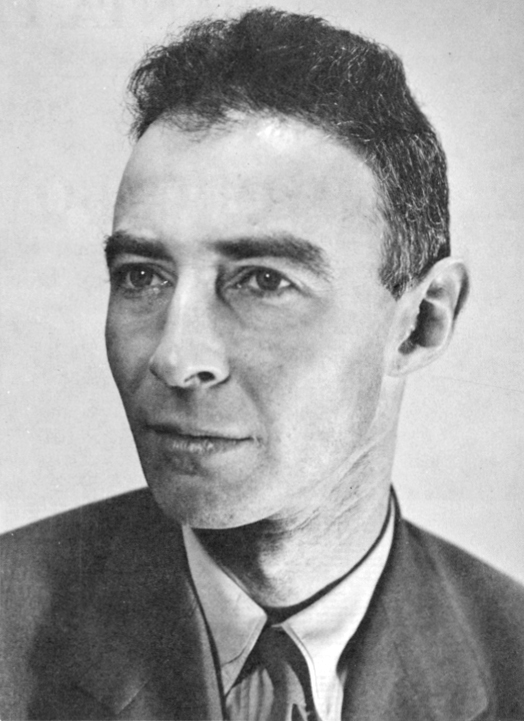
J. Robert Oppenheimer

- February 3 – Joe Meek, English record producer and sound engineer (b. 1929)
- February 6
  - Martine Carol, French actress (b. 1920)
  - Henry Morgenthau Jr., United States Secretary of the Treasury during World War II (b. 1891)
- February 7 – David Unaipon, Australian author and inventor (b. 1872)
- February 8 – Victor Gollancz, British publisher (b. 1893)
- February 13 – Abelardo L. Rodríguez, substitute president of Mexico (1932–1934) (b. 1889)
- February 14
  - Forough Farrokhzad, Iranian poet, writer and filmmaker (b. 1934)
  - Sig Ruman, German actor (b. 1884)
- February 15 – Antonio Moreno, Spanish actor (b. 1887)
- February 16 – Smiley Burnette, American actor (b. 1911)
- February 17 – Ciro Alegría, Peruvian journalist, politician, and novelist (b. 1909)
- February 18 – J. Robert Oppenheimer, American physicist (b. 1904)
- February 22 – David Ferrie, American pilot and anti-communist activist who was alleged by New Orleans District Attorney Jim Garrison to have been involved in a conspiracy to assassinate President John F. Kennedy.
- February 24 – Franz Waxman, German-American composer (b. 1906)
- February 28 – Henry Luce, American publisher (b. 1898)

=== March ===
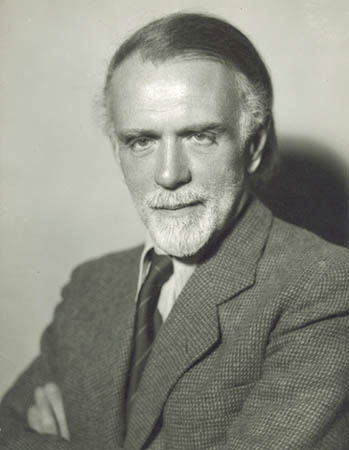
Zoltán Kodály

- March 2 – José Martínez Ruiz, 'Azorín', Spanish writer (b. 1873)
- March 5
  - Mischa Auer, Russian-born actor (b. 1905)
  - Mohammad Mosaddegh, Iranian politician, 35th Prime Minister of Iran (b. 1882)
  - Mbah Suro, Indonesian shaman and mystic (b. 1921)
  - Georges Vanier, Canadian Governor General (b. 1888)
- March 6
  - Nelson Eddy, American singer and actor (b. 1901)
  - Zoltán Kodály, Hungarian composer (b. 1882)
- March 7 – Alice B. Toklas, American avant-garde figure (b. 1877)
- March 11 – Geraldine Farrar, American soprano (b. 1882)
- March 23 – Pete Johnson, American boogie-woogie and jazz pianist, songwriter (b. 1904)
- March 25 – Johannes Itten, Swiss painter (b. 1888)
- March 27 – Jaroslav Heyrovský, Czech chemist, Nobel Prize laureate (b. 1890)
- March 31 – Rodion Malinovsky, Soviet military commander and Minister of Defence (b. 1898)

=== April ===
- April 5 – Hermann Joseph Muller, American geneticist, recipient of the Nobel Prize in Physiology or Medicine (b. 1890)
- April 13 – Luis Somoza Debayle, 26th President of Nicaragua (b. 1922)
- April 15 – Totò, Italian actor (b. 1898)
- April 18 – Friedrich Heiler, German theologian and historian (b. 1892)
- April 19
  - Konrad Adenauer, German statesman, first Chancellor of the Federal Republic of Germany (b. 1876)
  - William Boyle, 12th Earl of Cork, British admiral of the fleet (b. 1873)
- April 23 – Edgar Neville, Spanish playwright and film director (b. 1899)
- April 24 – Vladimir Komarov, Soviet cosmonaut (b. 1927)
- April 25 – Joseph Boxhall, British sailor, fourth officer of the RMS Titanic (b. 1884)
- April 27 – William Douglas Cook, New Zealand founder of Eastwoodhill Arboretum and Pukeiti (b. 1884)
- April 29 – Anthony Mann, American actor and director (b. 1906)

=== May ===
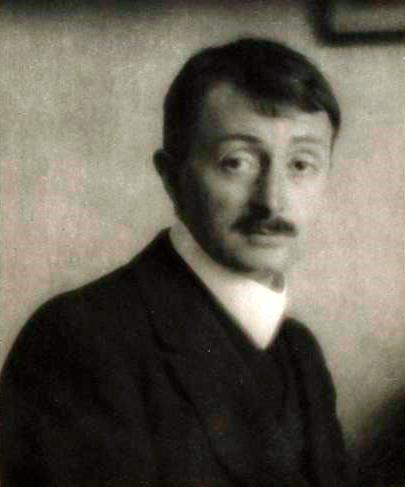
John Masefield

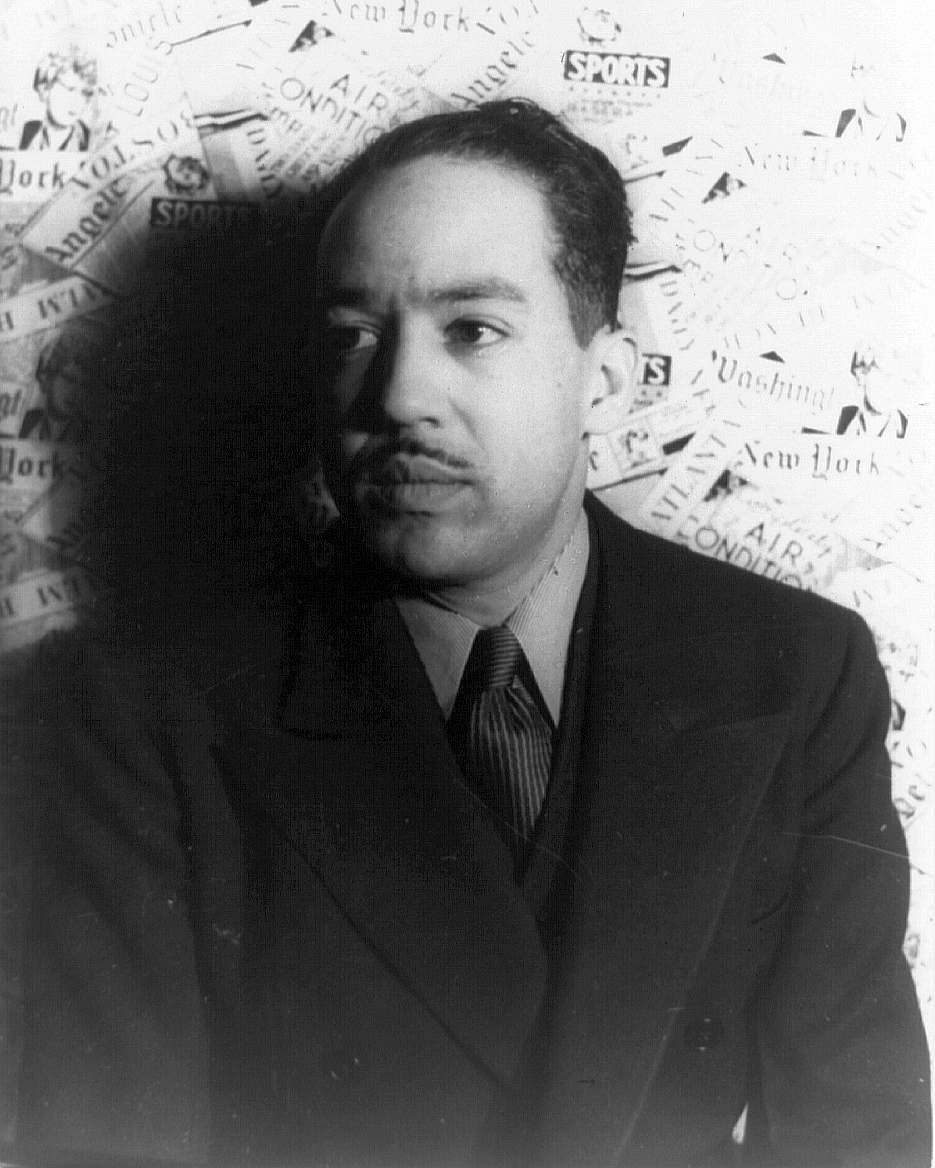
Langston Hughes

- May 6 – Zhou Zuoren, Chinese writer (b. 1885)
- May 7 – Anne Bauchens, American film editor (b. 1882)
- May 8
  - LaVerne Andrews, American singer (b. 1911)
  - Elmer Rice, American playwright (b. 1892)
- May 10 – Lorenzo Bandini, Italian Formula One driver (b. 1935)
- May 12 – John Masefield, English poet and novelist (b. 1878)
- May 13 – Lance Sharkey, Australian Communist leader (b. 1898)
- May 15 – Edward Hopper, American painter (b. 1882)
- May 21
  - Géza Lakatos, Hungarian general and politician, 36th Prime Minister of Hungary (b. 1890)
  - Rexhep Mitrovica, Albanian politician, 18th Prime Minister of Albania (b. 1888)
- May 22
  - Langston Hughes, American writer, novelist, playwright, and columnist (b. 1901)
  - Josip Plemelj, Slovene mathematician (b. 1873)
- May 27 – Tilly Edinger, German-born American scientist, founder of paleoneurology (b. 1897)
- May 29 – G. W. Pabst, Austrian film director (b. 1885)
- May 30 – Claude Rains, British actor (b. 1889)
- May 31 – Billy Strayhorn, American composer and pianist (b. 1915)

=== June ===
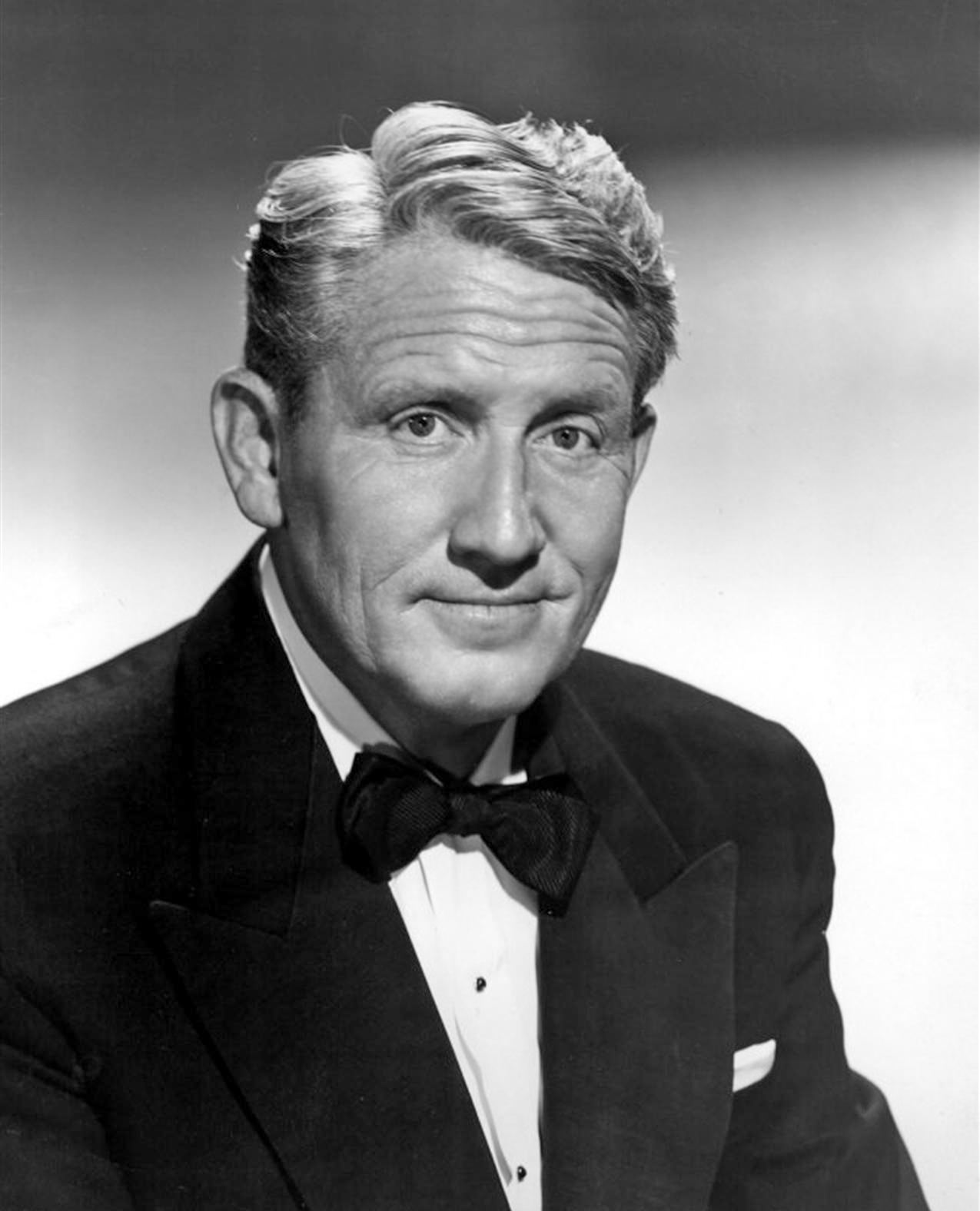
Spencer Tracy

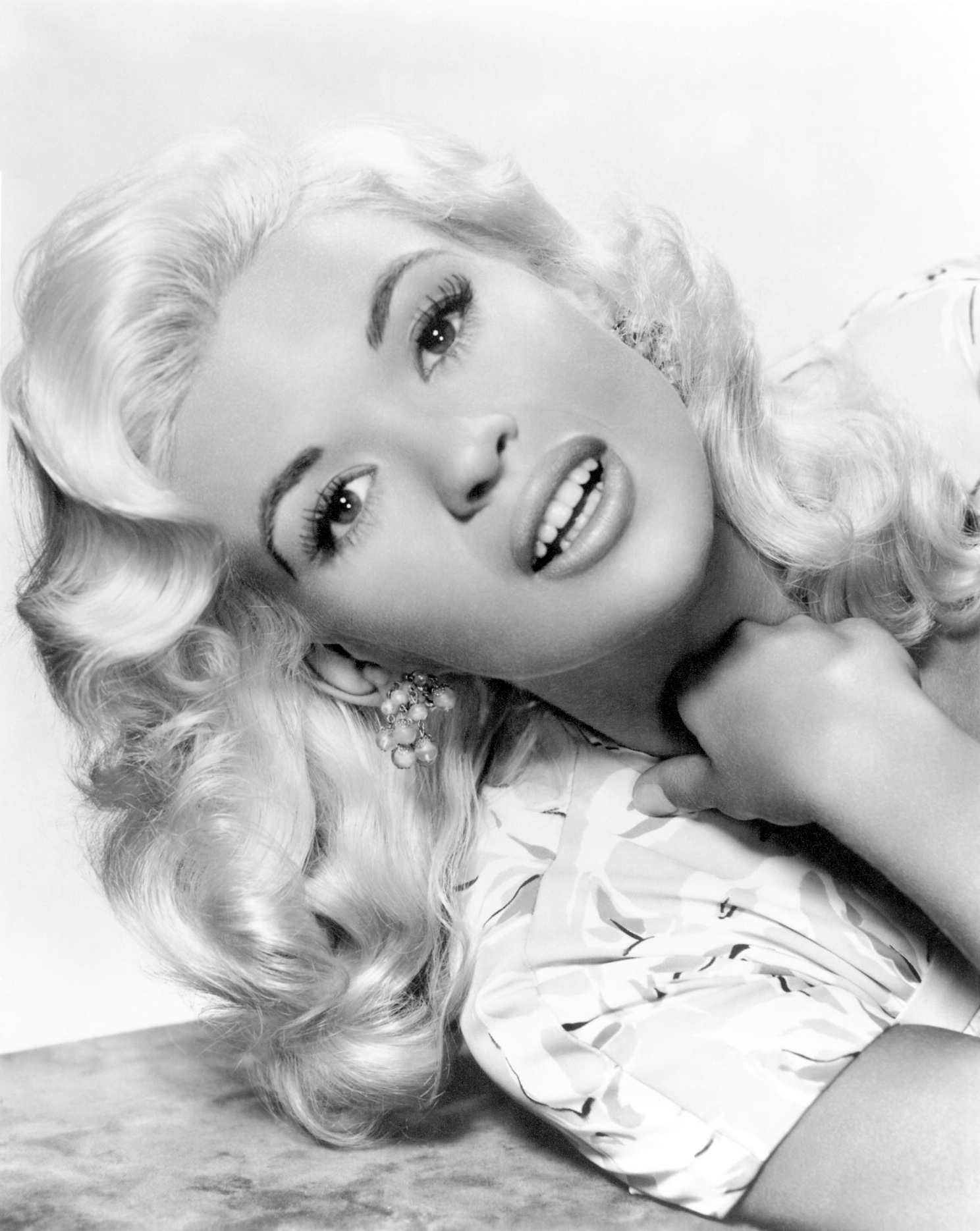
Jayne Mansfield

- June 2 – Ivan Miller, Canadian journalist and sportscaster (b. 1898)
- June 3 – Arthur Tedder, 1st Baron Tedder, British air force officer, Marshal of the Royal Air Force (b. 1890)
- June 5 – Arthur Biram, Israeli philosopher and educator, and Israel Prize recipient (b. 1878)
- June 6 – Edward Givens, American astronaut (b. 1930)
- June 7 – Dorothy Parker, American writer (b. 1893)
- June 10 – Spencer Tracy, American actor (b. 1900; heart attack)
- June 11 – Wolfgang Köhler, German psychologist (b. 1887)
- June 13 – Gerald Patterson, Australian tennis champion (b. 1895)
- June 14 – Eddie Eagan, American sportsman (b. 1897)
- June 16
  - Eugénie Cotton, French physicist, socialist, women's rights advocate (b. 1881)
  - Reginald Denny, English actor (b. 1891)
- June 26 – Françoise Dorléac, French actress (b. 1942; car accident)
- June 29
  - Primo Carnera, Italian boxer (b. 1906)
  - Jayne Mansfield, American actress (b. 1933)

=== July ===
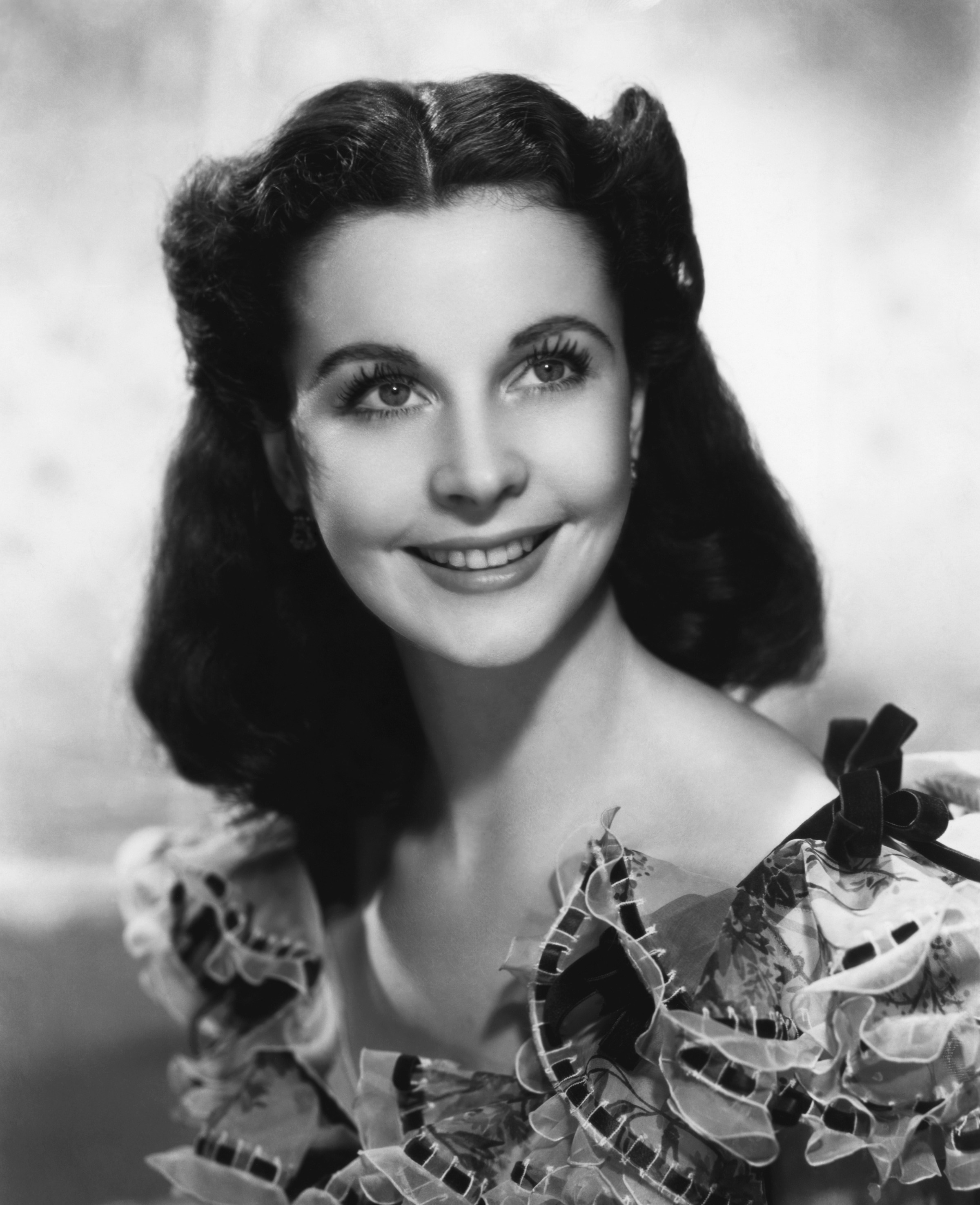
Vivien Leigh

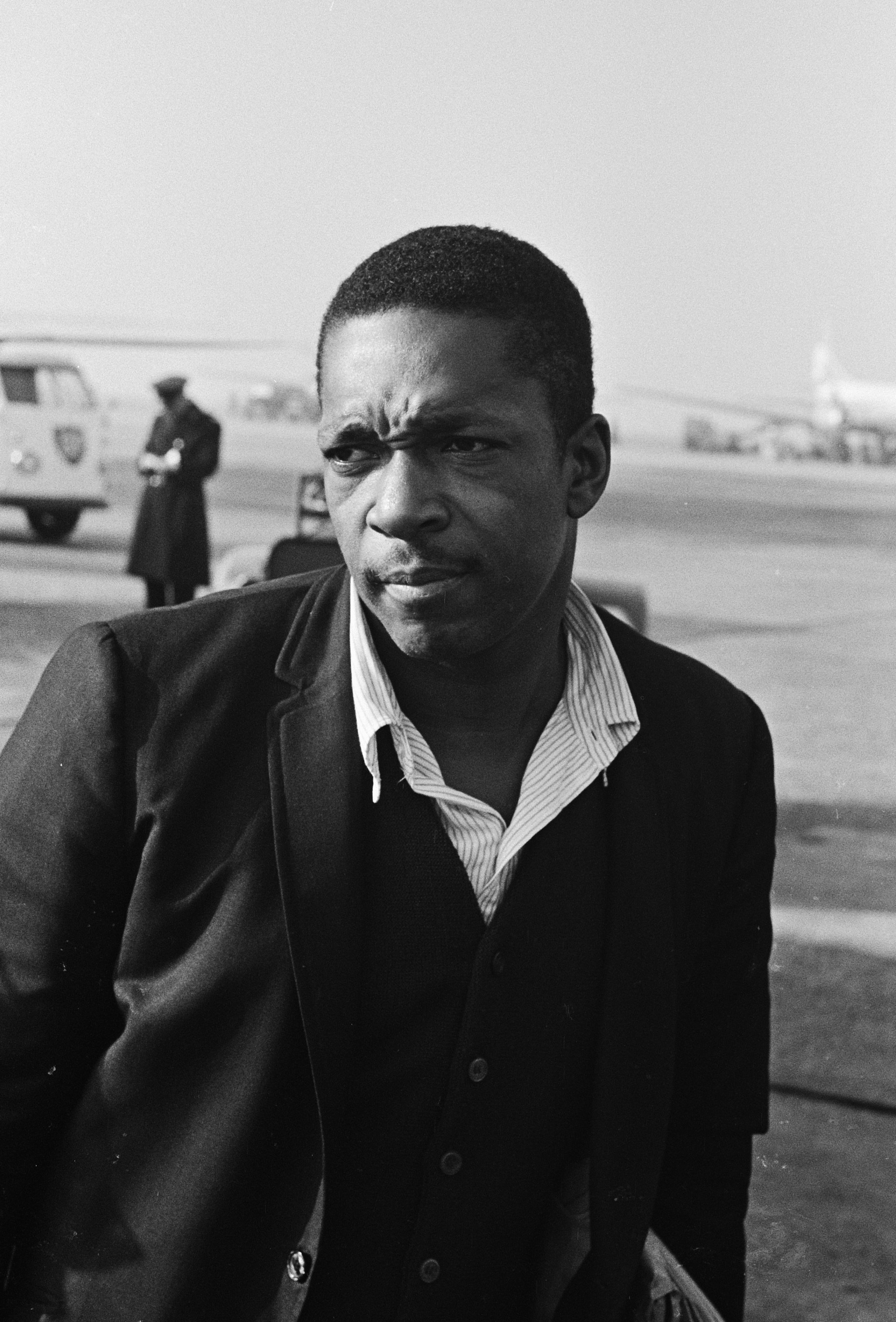
John Coltrane

- July 1 – Gerhard Ritter, German historian (b. 1888)
- July 8 – Vivien Leigh, English actress (b. 1913)
- July 9
  - Eugen Fischer, German professor of medicine, anthropology and eugenics (b. 1874)
  - Fatima Jinnah, Pakistan's "Mother of the Nation" (b. 1893)
- July 14 – Tudor Arghezi, Romanian writer (b. 1880)
- July 17 – John Coltrane, American jazz saxophonist (b. 1926)
- July 18 – Humberto de Alencar Castelo Branco, 26th President of Brazil (plane crash) (b. 1897)
- July 19 – John T. McNaughton, United States Assistant Secretary of Defense for International Security Affairs (plane crash) (b. 1921)
- July 20 – Lewis H. Brereton, American aviation pioneer and air force general (b. 1890)
- July 21
  - Jimmie Foxx, American baseball player (Philadelphia Athletics) and member of the MLB Hall of Fame (b. 1907)
  - Albert Luthuli, South African politician, recipient of the Nobel Peace Prize (b. 1898)
  - Basil Rathbone, British actor (b. 1892)
- July 22 – Carl Sandburg, American poet (b. 1878)
- July 31 – Richard Kuhn, Austrian chemist, Nobel Prize laureate (b. 1900)

=== August ===
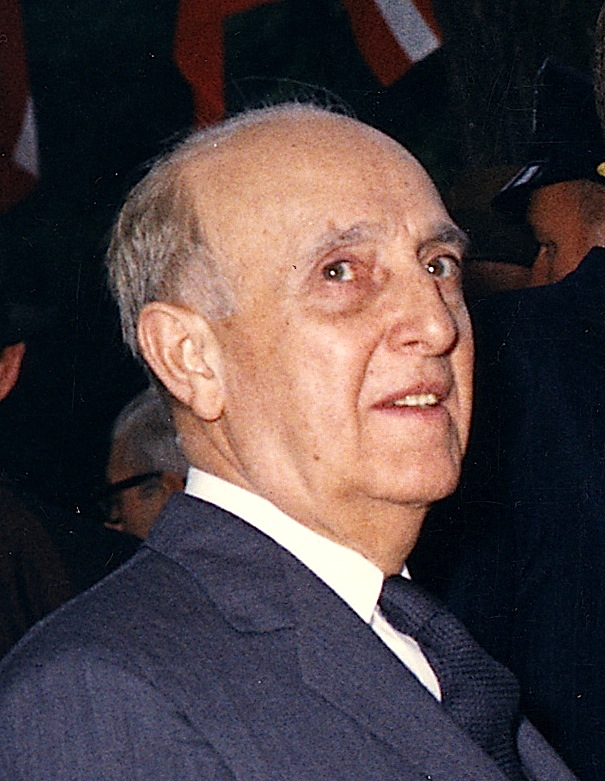
Manuel Prado Ugarteche

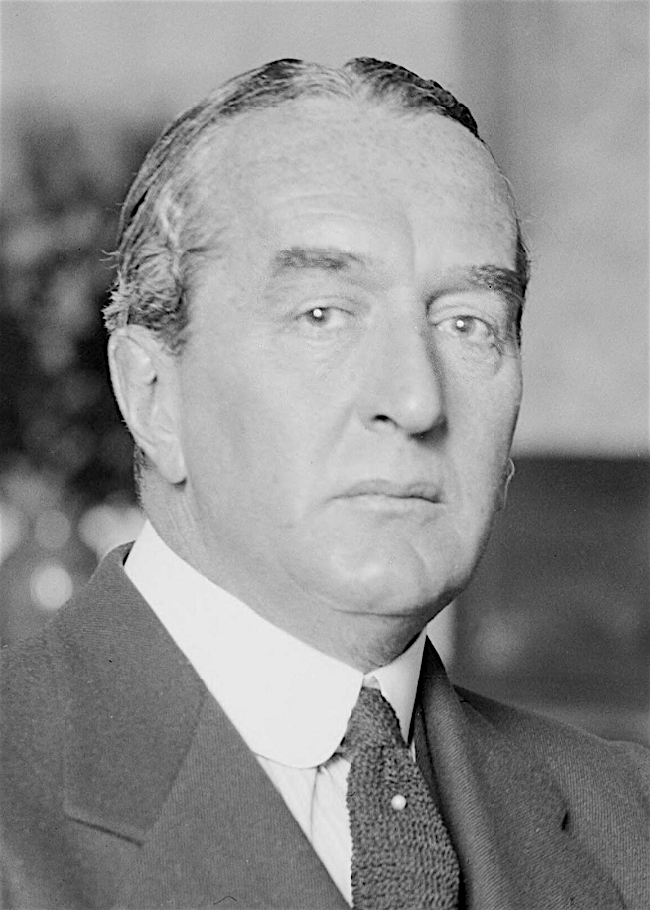
Stanley Bruce

- August 1 – Richard Kuhn, Austrian chemist, Nobel Prize laureate (b. 1900)
- August 9
  - Joe Orton, English playwright (b. 1933)
  - Anton Walbrook, Austrian actor (b. 1896)
- August 13 – Jane Darwell, American actress (b. 1879)
- August 15
  - Luis A. Eguiguren, Peruvian historian and politician (b. 1887)
  - René Magritte, Belgian painter (b. 1898)
  - Manuel Prado Ugarteche, 50th & 54th President of Peru (b. 1889)
- August 16
  - Frank Chavez, Teamsters union official
- August 19
  - Isaac Deutscher, British Marxist historian (b. 1907)
  - Hugo Gernsback, Luxembourg-born editor and publisher (b. 1884)
- August 22 – Gregory G. Pincus, American biologist and researcher (b. 1903)
- August 23 – Nathaniel Cartmell, American Olympic athlete (b. 1883)
- August 24 – Henry J. Kaiser, American industrialist (b. 1882)
- August 25
  - Stanley Bruce, 8th Prime Minister of Australia (b. 1883)
  - Paul Muni, American actor (b. 1895)
  - George Lincoln Rockwell, American Nazi Party leader (b. 1918)
- August 27 – Brian Epstein, English band manager (The Beatles) (b. 1934)
- August 30
  - Samuel Mosberg, American boxer, Olympic champion (b. 1896)
  - Ad Reinhardt, American painter (b. 1913)
- August 31
  - Ilya Ehrenburg, Russian writer (b. 1891)
  - Mikhail Kovalyov, Soviet general (b. 1897)

=== September ===
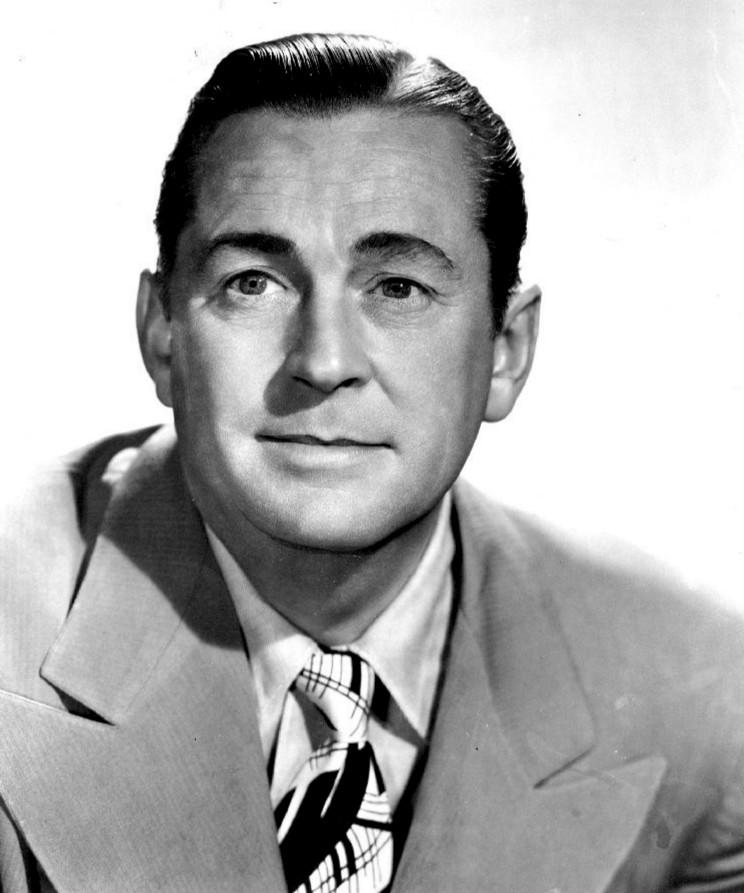
James Dunn

- September 1
  - James Dunn, American actor (b. 1901)
  - Ilse Koch, Nazi German war criminal (b. 1906)
  - Siegfried Sassoon, British poet (b. 1886)
- September 2 – Francis Ouimet, American professional golfer (b. 1893)
- September 8 – Juliusz Rómmel, Polish general (b. 1881)
- September 12 – Vladimir Bartol, Slovene author (b. 1903)
- September 13 – Varian Fry, American journalist (b. 1907)
- September 16 – Pavlo Tychyna, Ukrainian poet, translator, publicist, public activist, academician, and statesman. (b. 1891)
- September 18 – Sir John Cockcroft, English physicist, Nobel Prize laureate (b. 1897)
- September 27 – Prince Felix Yusupov, Russian assassin of Rasputin (b. 1887)
- September 29 – Carson McCullers, American writer (b. 1917)

=== October ===
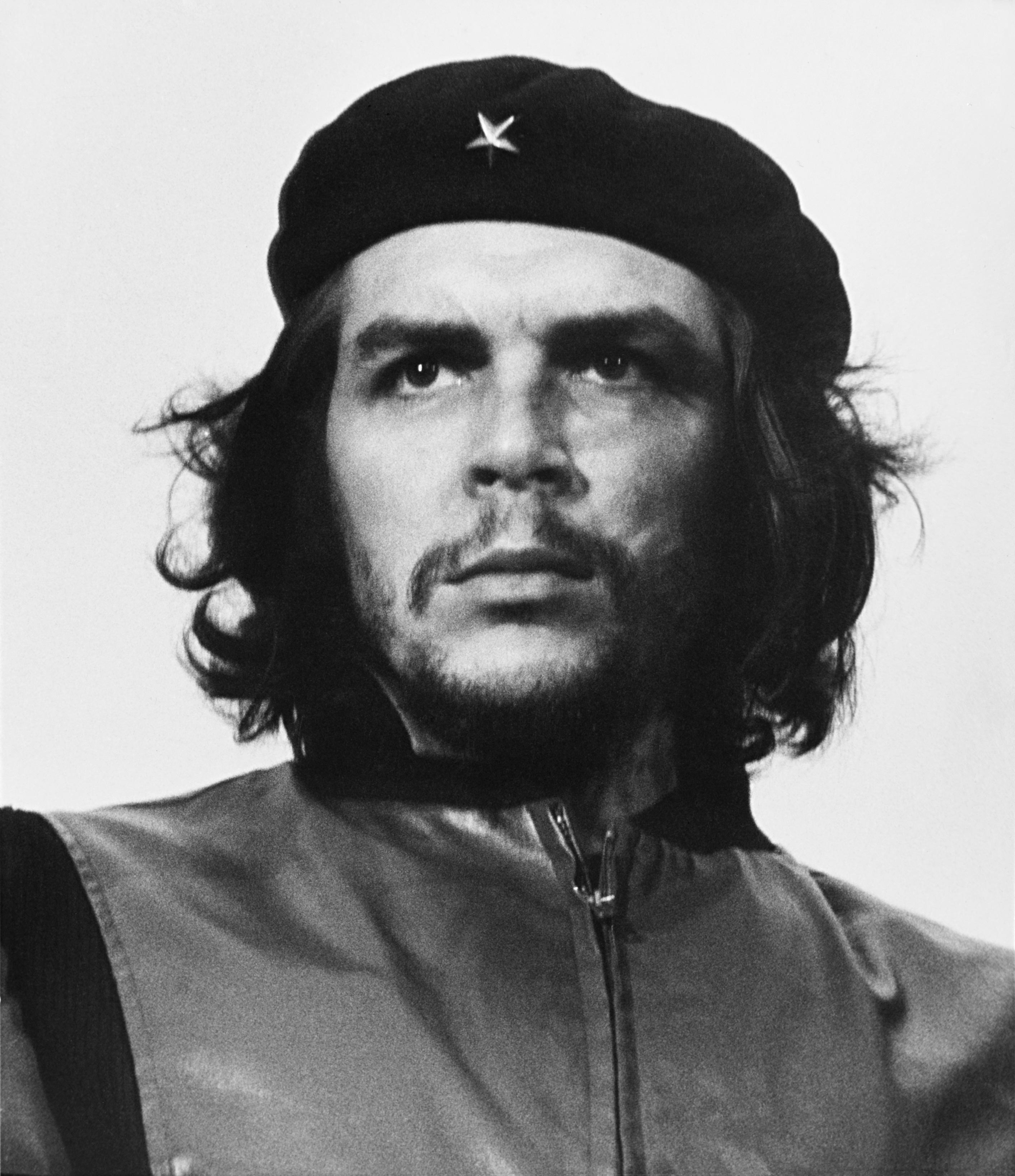
Che Guevara

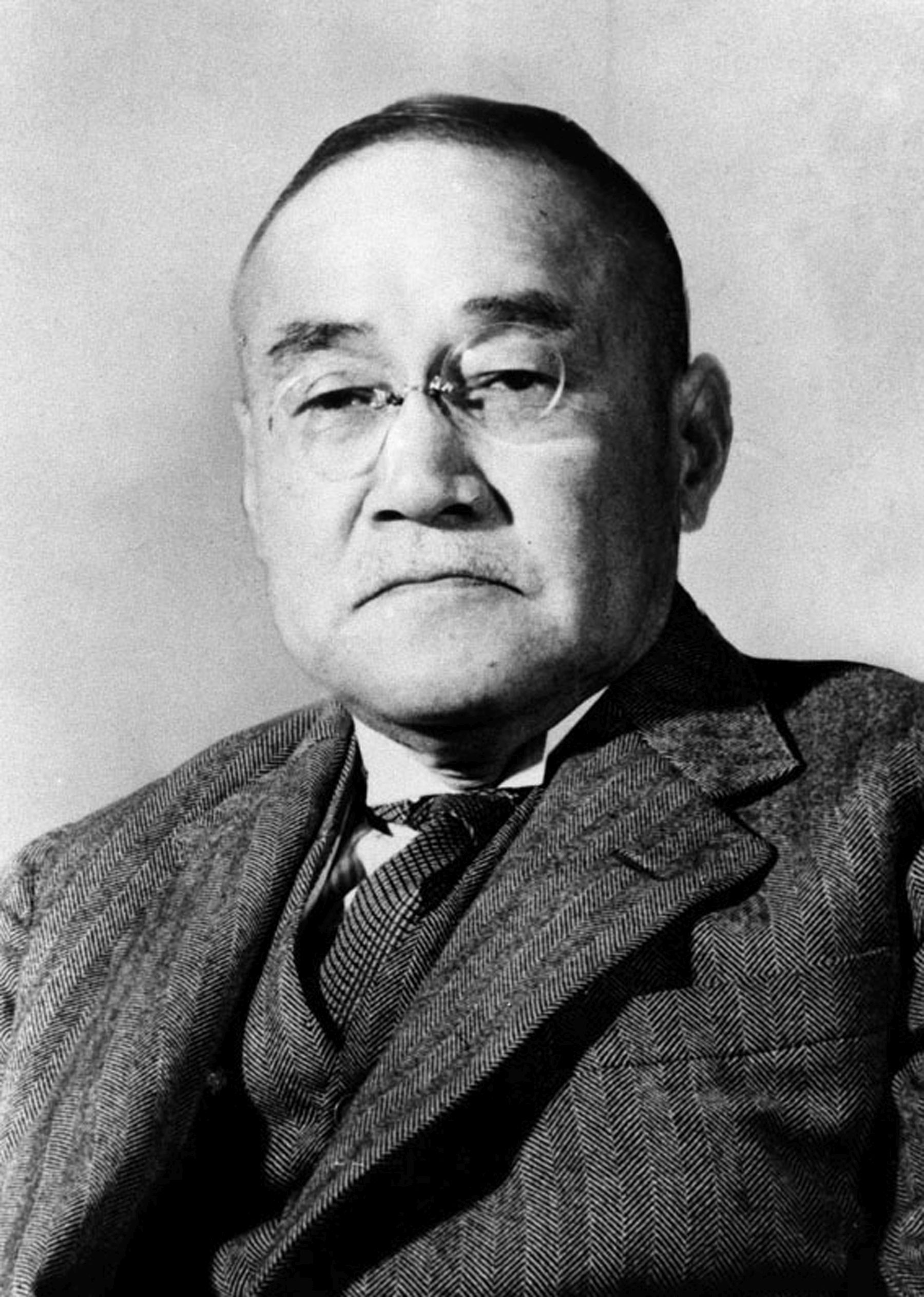
Shigeru Yoshida

- October 3
  - Woody Guthrie, American folk musician (b. 1912)
  - Sir Malcolm Sargent, English conductor (b. 1895)
- October 5 – Clifton Williams, American astronaut (b. 1932)
- October 7 – Sir Norman Angell, British politician, recipient of the Nobel Peace Prize (b. 1872)
- October 8 – Clement Attlee, British politician, 60th Prime Minister of the United Kingdom (b. 1883)
- October 9
  - Gordon Allport, American psychologist (b. 1897)
  - Che Guevara, Argentine communist revolutionary (b. 1928)
  - Sir Cyril Hinshelwood, English chemist, Nobel Prize laureate (b. 1897)
  - André Maurois, French author (b. 1885)
  - Joseph Pilates, German physical culturist and developer of Pilates (b. 1883)
  - Edith Storey, American actress (b. 1892)
- October 12 – Nat Pendleton, American actor and Olympic wrestler (b. 1895)
- October 14 – Marcel Aymé, French writer (b. 1902)
- October 17 – Puyi, last Emperor of China (b. 1906)
- October 20 – Shigeru Yoshida, Japanese diplomat and politician, 32nd Prime Minister of Japan (b. 1878)
- October 21 – Ejnar Hertzsprung, Danish chemist and astronomer (b. 1873)
- October 29 – Julien Duvivier, French film director (b. 1896)

=== November ===
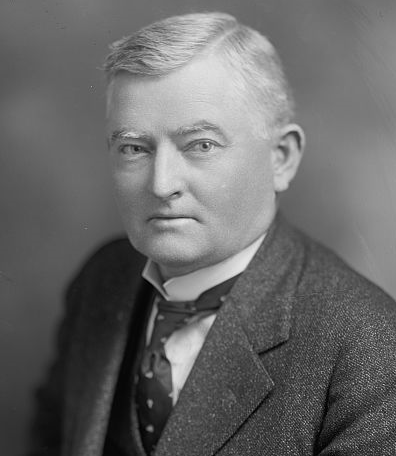
John Nance Garner

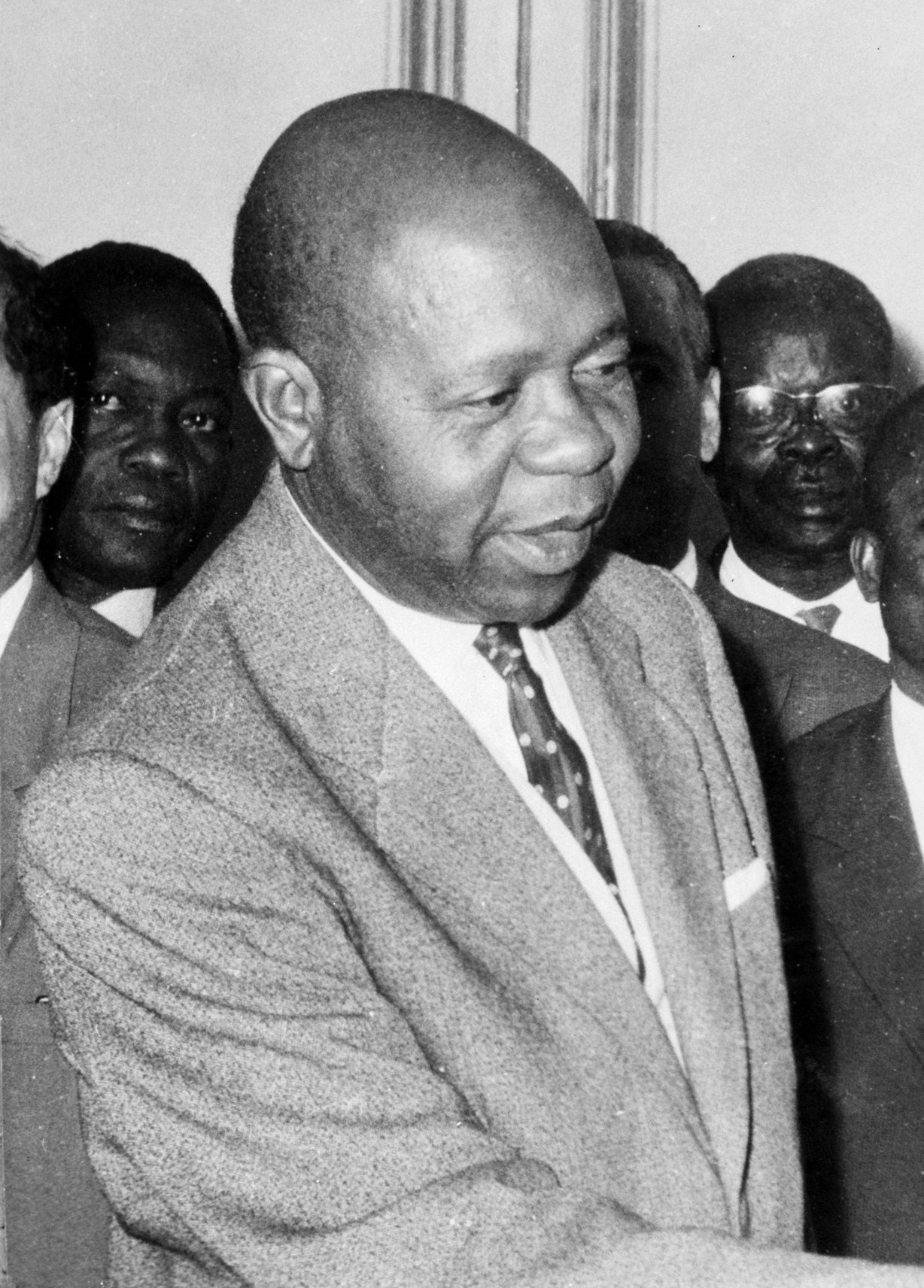
Léon M'ba

- November 7 – John Nance Garner, 32nd Vice President of the United States (b. 1868)
- November 9 – Charles Bickford, American actor (b. 1891)
- November 15 – Alice Lake, American actress (b. 1895)
- November 18 – Marie Keen, American politician (b. 1895)
- November 19 – Casimir Funk, Polish biochemist (b. 1884)
- November 20 – Józef Skoczyński, Polish Roman Catholic priest and social activist (b. 1903)
- November 21 – Florence Reed, American actress (b. 1883)
- November 25 – Ossip Zadkine, Russian sculptor, painter and lithographer (b. 1888)
- November 26 – Albert Warner, American film producer (b. 1884)
- November 28 – Léon M'ba, 1st president of Gabon (b. 1902)
- November 29 – Ferenc Münnich, 47th prime minister of Hungary (b. 1886)

=== December ===
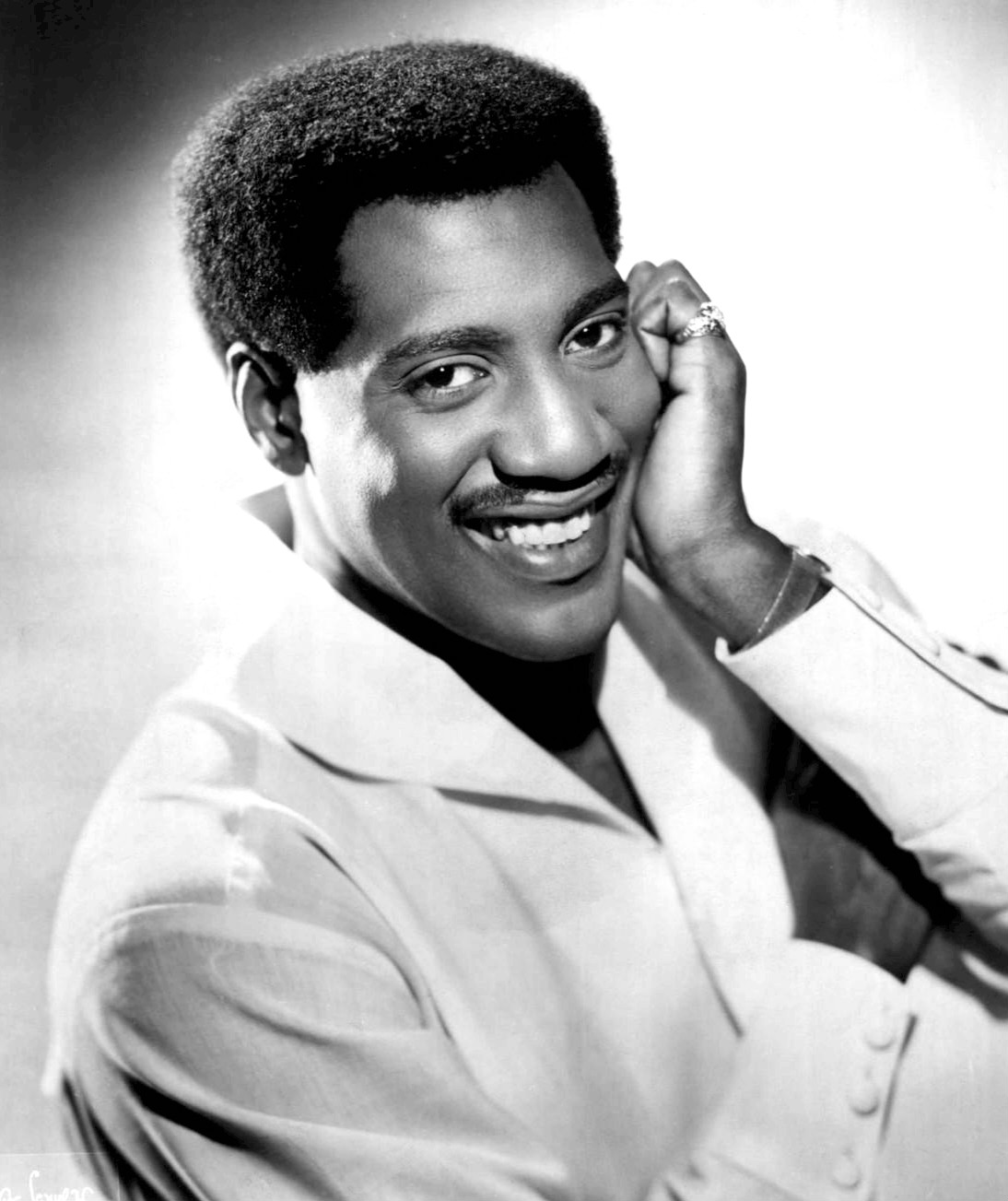
Otis Redding

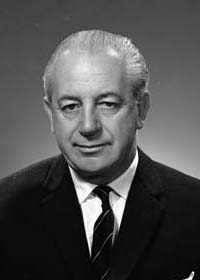
Harold Holt

- December 4
  - Daniel Jones, British phonetician (b. 1881)
  - Bert Lahr, American actor (b. 1895)
- December 8 – Robert Henry Lawrence Jr., American astronaut (b. 1935)
- December 10 – Otis Redding, American singer (b. 1941)
- December 11 – Victor de Sabata, Italian conductor and composer (b. 1892)
- December 17 – Harold Holt, 17th Prime Minister of Australia (body never found) (b. 1908)
- December 21 – Ejnar Hertzsprung, Danish chemist and astronomer (b. 1873)
- December 26 – Sydney Barnes, English cricketer (b. 1873)
- December 28 – Katharine McCormick, American suffragist (b. 1875)
- December 29 – Paul Whiteman, American bandleader (b. 1890)
- December 30 – Vincent Massey, Canadian Governor General (b. 1887)

=== Date unknown ===
- Fathollah Khan Akbar, Iranian cabinet minister, 17th Prime Minister of Iran (b. 1878)

== Nobel Prizes ==
Nobel medal

- Physics – Hans Bethe
- Chemistry – Manfred Eigen, Ronald George Wreyford Norrish, George Porter
- Physiology or Medicine – Ragnar Granit, Haldan Keffer Hartline, George Wald
- Literature – Miguel Ángel Asturias
- Peace – not awarded

== Sources ==
- 1967 – Headlines A report from Michael Wallace of WCBS Newsradio 880 (WCBS-AM New York) Part of WCBS 880's celebration of 40 years of newsradio.
- 1967 – The Year in Sound An Audiofile produced by Lou Zambrana of WCBS Newsradio 880 (WCBS-AM New York) Part of WCBS 880's celebration of 40 years of newsradio.
- Everything you want to know about the Expo 67
