= George W. Stoddard =

American architect (1895–1967)

- Born: George Wellington Stoddard; September 30, 1895; Detroit, Michigan, United States
- Died: September 28, 1967 (aged 71); Seattle, Washington, United States
- Occupation: Architect
- Years active: 1920–1960
- Style: Moderne; Modernist
- Spouse: Majorie C. Stoddard

George Wellington Stoddard (September 30, 1895 – September 28, 1967) was an American architect. Born in Detroit, he graduated from the University of Illinois shortly before being drafted into the American Expeditionary Forces in 1917. Upon his return to the United States, he traveled to Seattle and founded the architecture and construction firm Stoddard and Son with his father. After building a variety of residential and commercial structures together, his father died in 1929, and Stoddard continued private practice under his own name. During his early career he mainly designed buildings according to the popular Moderne architectural style, but shifted towards a more experimental Modernist approach, especially after World War II.

In 1939, he was censured and temporarily suspended by the American Institute of Architects for violating AIA guidelines against advertisement due to a showcase of his work published in an architecture magazine. The same year, he partnered with a group of prominent local architects to design Yesler Terrace, the first major public housing development in Seattle. He carried out a large number of commissions in the late 1940s and 1950s, including schools and bank branches, alongside structures such as the Green Lake Aqua Theater and Memorial Stadium.

== Biography ==
George Wellington Stoddard was born in Detroit, Michigan, on September 30, 1895, to Laura and Lewis Malcolm Stoddard. He had one sibling, an older brother. His father was a civil engineer, steamboat captain, and naval architect. He attended the University of Illinois Urbana-Champaign, obtaining his Bachelor of Science in 1917. Due to World War I, he was drafted into the military immediately after graduation, and served in the American Expeditionary Forces in France from 1917 to 1920.

Following the war, he settled in Seattle, Washington, with his father and founded the firm Stoddard and Son, Architects and Builders in 1920. Together, they designed and constructed a variety of buildings, including private residences, industrial plants, and apartment buildings. The elder Stoddard died in February 1929, leaving George to continue as the head of his own private practice. Stoddard's work in Seattle during the 1930s was aligned with the Moderne architecture movement, represented by buildings such as his 1931 design for the Harlan Fairbanks Company Building. Influenced by the economic climate of the Great Depression, designs of the Moderne movement generally sought to present themselves as luxurious and modern, while maintaining efficiency through simple and inexpensive architecture.

Stoddard fell under intense criticism from the American Institute of Architects (AIA) for a showcase in the July 1939 issue of the magazine Architecture and Design. Unlike trade magazines such as Architectural Record, Architecture and Design featured little news or information relevant to the field, with each issue showing off the work of an individual architect or firm. This violated the AIA's regulations against architectural advertisements; the Judicial Committee of the AIA characterized the magazine as an attempt to "intrigue or coerce the architect into unwittingly [falling] for allurements which lead him out of the paths of righteousness." The AIA censured Stoddard and suspended him from architectural practice for three months. A member of the AIA's Washington State chapter since 1922, Stoddard wrote an apology to the institute and attempted to appeal, but the suspension was maintained.

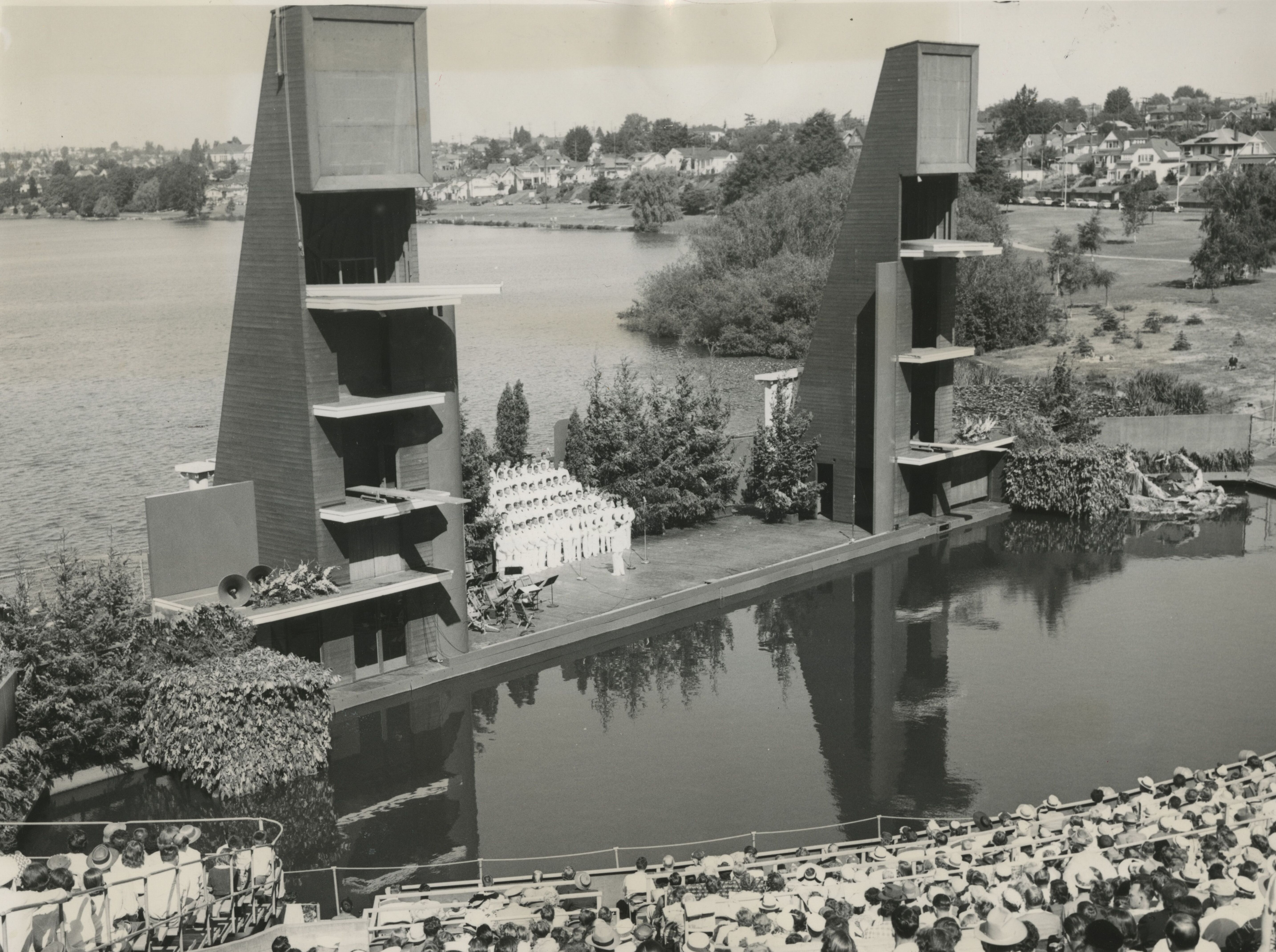
Stoddard's Green Lake Aqua Theater, 1954

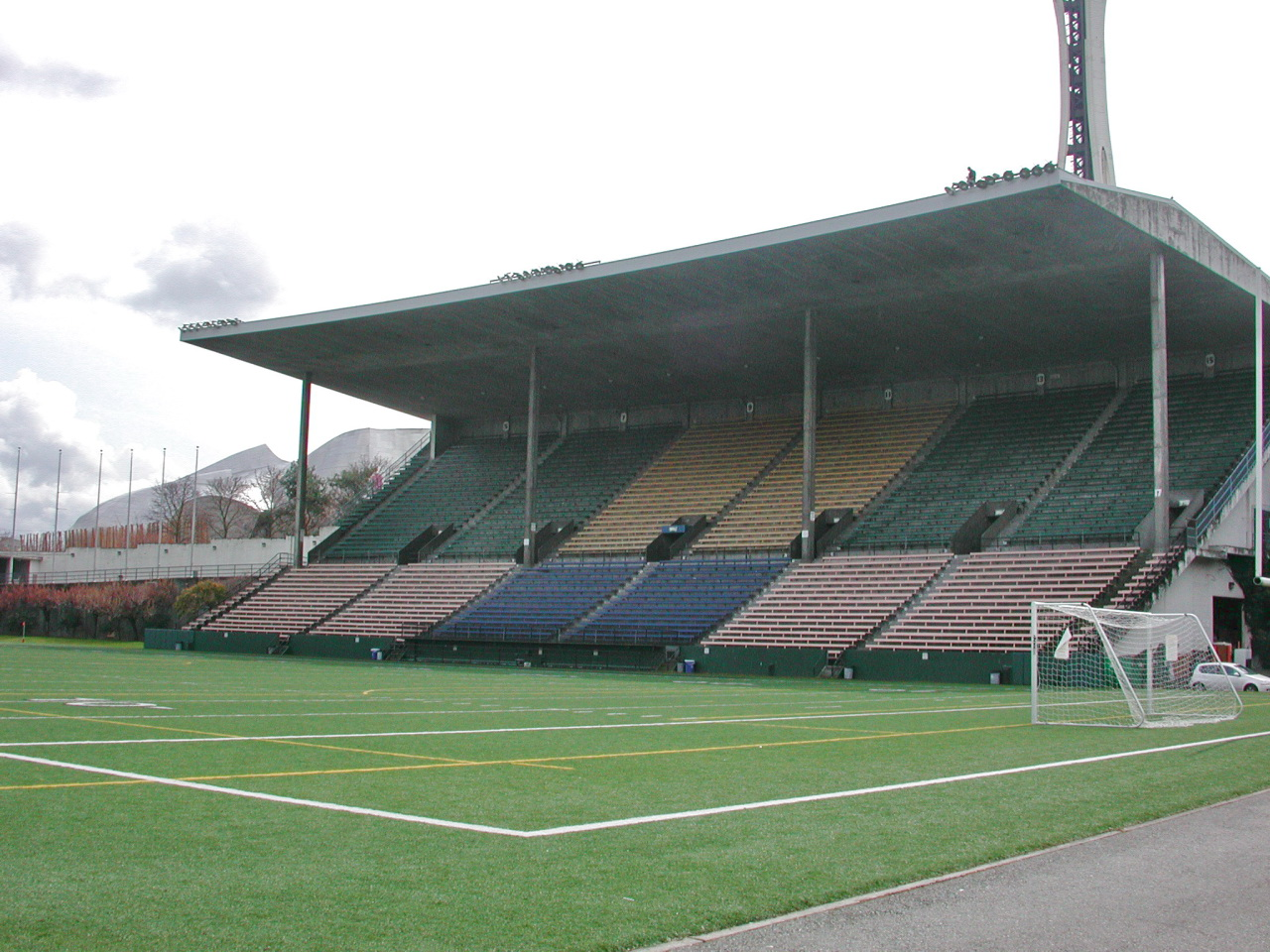
Stoddard's Memorial Stadium, 2008

From 1939 to 1942, Stoddard partnered with architects William Aitken, J. Lister Holmes, William J. Bain, and John T. Jacobsen to design Yesler Terrace, the first racially-integrated housing project in the United States. He drew plans for a proposed King County Hospital wing, to be funded by a county tax levy alongside a Federal Works Agency grant. The county voted against the levy, cancelling the project and resulting in Stoddard never being paid for the plans. He sued the county in an attempt to secure payment, but the case was dismissed by a superior court judge.

After World War II, Stoddard's work turned towards a more strict and experimental Modernist approach. Stoddard and his firm carried out a large number of commissions in the late 1940s and 1950s, including a number of schools and bank branches across the Seattle area, alongside the Green Lake Aqua Theater and the Memorial Stadium. In 1949, he expanded the University of Washington's Husky Stadium alongside structural engineer Sigmund Ivarsson. From 1955 to 1960, he partnered with Francis Huggard to form the firm Stoddard-Huggard & Associates. Together, they designed the Battery Street branch of the National Bank of Commerce in Seattle, Sand Point Elementary School, and an addition to Madrona Elementary School. He retired from architecture in 1960, although one of his designs (a National Bank of Commerce branch in Wenatchee) would not be built until 1964.

=== Personal life ===
Stoddard served in a number of civic organizations and boards. He was a member of the State Hospital Advisory Council Executive Committee from 1948 to 1949, the chairman of the Seattle Civic Arts Committee from 1947, and a member of the King County Educational Advisory Committee and Juvenile Advisory Committee during the early 1950s. He was also a member of the Rainier Club, the Seattle Chamber of Commerce, and the board of the Seattle Symphony. A senior member of the AIA, he served as the president of its Washington state chapter from 1946 to 1947. He died in Seattle on September 28, 1967.

== Works ==
Name	Location	Date	Ref.
Park Court Apartments	Seattle, Washington	1922	
Saint Luke's Church	Ballard, Seattle, Washington	1922	
George A. Kribs House	Seattle, Washington	1922–1923	
Metropolitan Printing Plant	Seattle, Washington	1923	
Broadmoor gate and caretaker house	Broadmoor, Seattle, Washington	1923–1924	
Fox Garage Building	Seattle, Washington	1925	
Bergonian Hotel	Seattle, Washington	1926–1927	
Metropolitan Printing Press	Seattle, Washington	1931	
Blue Ridge houses	Seattle, Washington	1935	
Yesler Terrace	Seattle, Washington	1939–1942	
Stoddard Terrace Apartments	Seattle, Washington	1944	
Memorial Stadium	Seattle, Washington	1945–1947	
Overlake High School	Bellevue, Washington	1946	
Renton Hospital	Renton, Washington	1946	
Virginia Mason Nurses Residence	Seattle, Washington	1947	
Kirsten Pipe Company Building	Seattle, Washington	1947	
Dallam Furniture Company Building	Wenatchee, Washington	1947	
Arbor Heights Elementary School	Seattle, Washington	1948–1949	
Simpson Timber Company Office	Shelton, Washington	1949	
Husky Stadium (south stands)	Seattle, Washington	1949–1950	
Laurelhurst Elementary School (addition)	Seattle, Washington	1949–1950	
Green Lake Aqua Theater	Seattle, Washington	1950	
Ellensburg Police & Fire Station	Ellensburg, Washington	1953–1954	
Seattle 1st National Bank	5th Avenue and Olive Way, Seattle, Washington	1955	
National Bank of Commerce, Queen Anne Branch	Queen Anne, Seattle, Washington	1955	
National Bank of Commerce, Battery Street Branch	Seattle, Washington	1955	
National Bank of Commerce, Olive Way Branch	Seattle, Washington	1956	
Sand Point Elementary School	Seattle, Washington	1957–1958	
American Lake Veteran's Medical Center Chapel	Joint Base Lewis–McChord, Washington	1958	
Madrona Elementary School (addition)	Seattle, Washington	1960–1961	
National Bank of Commerce, Columbia Valley Branch	Wenatchee, Washington	1964	
