= J. Lister Holmes =

American architect (1891–1986)

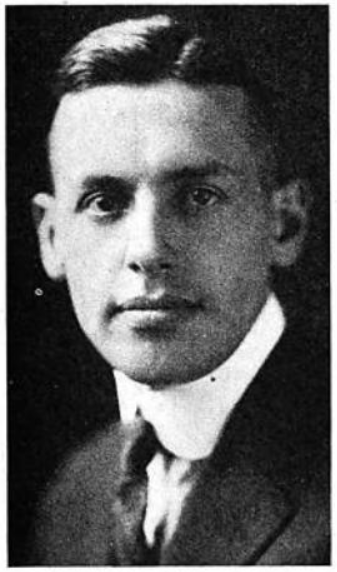
- Holmes in the 1920s
- Born: Joseph Lister Holmes; July 6, 1891; Seattle, Washington, United States
- Died: July 18, 1986 (aged 95); Seattle, Washington, United States
- Education: University of Washington, University of Pennsylvania
- Occupation: Architect
- Years active: 1913–1970
- Spouse: Jane Ingram Lambuth (m. 1917–1975) Janet Powell Tourtellotte (m. 1976)

Joseph Lister Holmes (July 6, 1891 – July 18, 1986) was an American architect active in Seattle. After studying Beaux-Arts architecture at the University of Pennsylvania in the early 1910s, he worked at various architectural firms in Philadelphia, Montana, and Seattle before founding a private practice in 1922. He designed a variety of revivalist houses during the 1920s and 1930s, including examples in the Tudor Revival, Châteauesque, Norman, and Colonial Revival styles.

Beginning in the mid-1930s, Holmes began to shift towards a modernist aesthetic, influenced by the International Style and what would become the Northwest Regional style. After his well-received modernist Dessau House (built 1937–1939), he was commissioned to design the Washington State Pavilion at the 1939 New York World's Fair alongside Victor N. J. Jones and Carl Frelinghuysen Gould. From 1940 to 1943 he was the lead architect of Yesler Terrace, the first major public housing project in Seattle. During World War II, he designed various residential structures for military use; work for the military continued postwar, when he coordinated a redevelopment plan for Fort Lewis. In his later years, he gradually shifted away from housing projects towards designing offices and sorting facilities for the United Parcel Service, with his last commission in 1968–1970.

== Biography ==
On July 6, 1891, Joseph Lister Holmes was born in Seattle, Washington, to physician Samuel J. Holmes and his wife Alice Lennox Holmes, the second of their two children. He studied civil engineering at the University of Washington from 1909 to 1911, before transferring to the University of Pennsylvania in Philadelphia. While at Penn, he focused on Beaux-Arts architecture in a program directed by Paul Philippe Cret. He was a member of the Sigma Chi fraternity. He received his Bachelor of Science in 1913, and worked for a brief period at various architectural offices in Philadelphia.

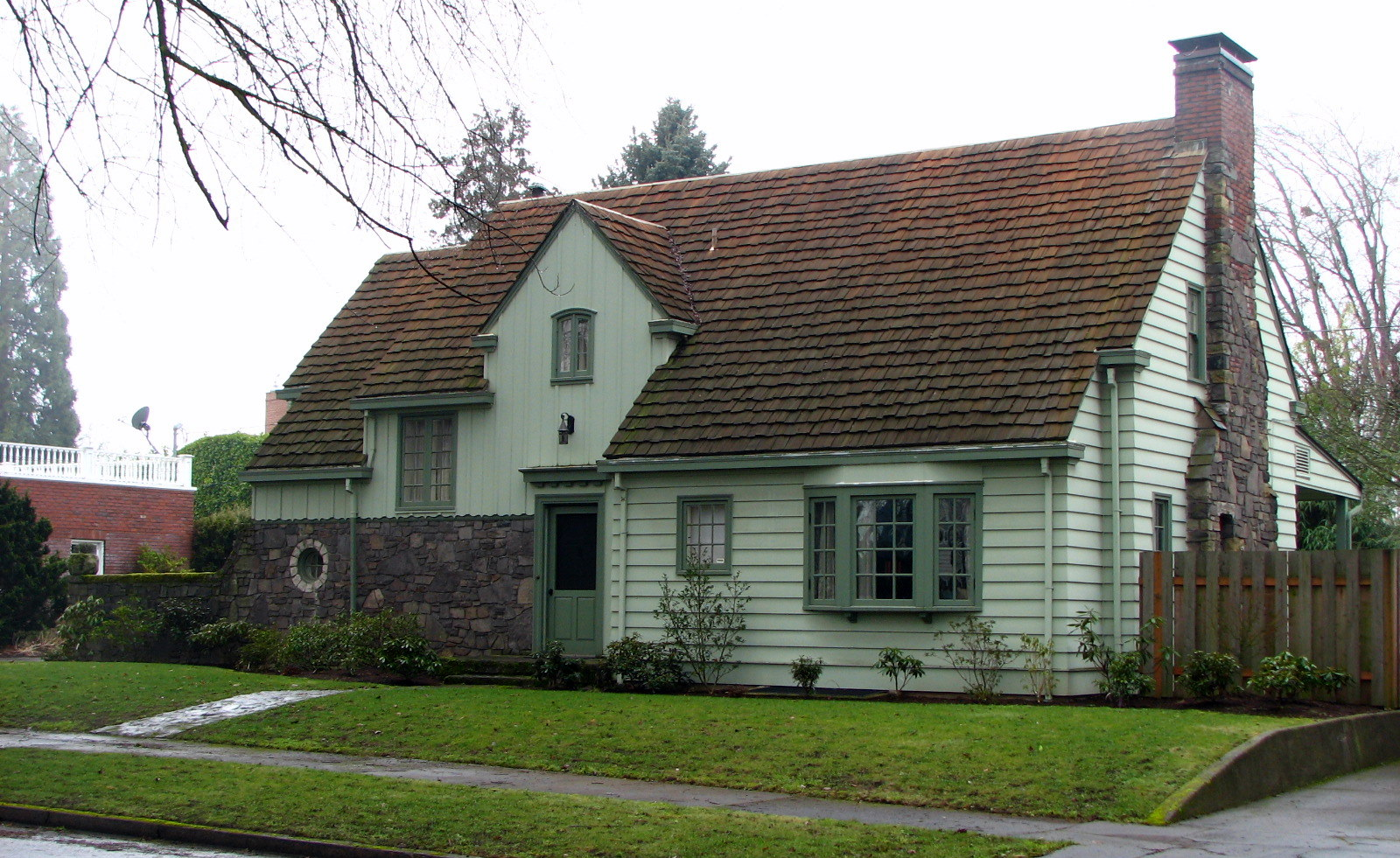
The West Coast Woods Model Home, designed by Holmes alongside Otho McCracken

He returned to Seattle to work as a draftsman for architect Édouard Frère Champney from 1914 to 1917. After this, he began work for Link & Haire, a regional architectural firm based in Lewistown, Montana. In 1920, Holmes again returned home to Seattle to work at various prominent firms, including Bebb & Gould; Schack, Young, and Myers; and the office of B. Marcus Priteca, where he briefly became a partner of the firm. After a number of successful home designs he began independent work in 1922. His initial commissions comprised private residences built in a variety of historical styles. In 1923–1925 he designed the Donovan House in Bellingham, Washington, based on Spanish Colonial Revival architecture, including a red-tile roof and white stucco. During the 1920s and early 1930s, he designed houses in a Tudor style in Seattle and Beaverton, Oregon. Many of his homes were based on 18th-century French château and Norman Style architecture, including his own home constructed in Madison Park, Seattle, from 1928 to 1930, alongside grand mansions such as the Bloedel Reserve on Bainbridge Island. In 1927 he designed the West Coast Woods Model Home in Portland, Oregon, along with Otho McCracken.

By the mid-1930s, American architecture had begun to shift away from Beaux-Arts towards modernist modes such as the International Style. After a 1936 Colonial Revival project in Seattle, Holmes generally moved to a new aesthetic which combined the International Style with elements of what would become the Northwest Regional style. He described his Dessau House (built 1937–1939) as "a cross between Modern and Japanese, which has many of the elements of Modern in it." Thanks to positive press from the Dessau House, he was tasked to design the Washington State Pavilion at the 1939 New York World's Fair with Victor N. J. Jones and Carl Frelinghuysen Gould. In 1937, he partnered with the Philadelphia firm Mellor, Meigs & Howe to design a Tudor Revival house for Phi Gamma Delta in the University District.

In 1940, the Seattle Housing Authority hired Holmes to serve as the chief architect of the Yesler Terrace development, the first racially-integrated public housing development in the United States. He directed a number of other prominent architects, including William Aitken, William J. Bain, and John T. Jacobsen. During World War II, he directed architects in the defense housing commissions at Gatewood Heights and Seward Park, as well as the Rainier Vista School in Seattle. He returned to private practice after the war, spending the first few years designing bank branch locations. Although still incorporating northwest regional styles in works such as the Rubinstein House (constructed 1945–1947), he moved towards an increasingly "pure" modernist aesthetic over the course of the late 1940s in civic designs such as the Seattle Public Schools Administration Building and Catharine Blaine Junior High School.

Holmes joined the Seattle Planning Commission in 1947, serving as its chairman from 1948 to 1950 before leaving the body in 1955. Additionally, he served on the national board of the American Society of Planning Officials from 1948 to 1951. His interest and experience in urban planning led to him directing the Fort Lewis Peacetime Development Master Plan from 1950 to 1952, which oversaw redevelopments in commercial, residential, and transport infrastructure at Fort Lewis. From 1953 to 1954, he briefly joined with three associates to create the firm Holmes, McClure, Adkison, and MacDonald, but returned to doing business under the title of "J. Lister Holmes and Associates" by 1955.

Holmes was a member of the Washington chapter of the American Institute of Architects (AIA) from 1926 until his death, becoming a fellow of the institute in 1955. He served as president of the Washington State chapter of the AIA from 1931 to 1933, after previously serving as its secretary and vice-president. He gradually reduced his workload over the course of the 1950s and 1960s. His last major project was a series of United Parcel Service (UPS) distribution centers across the west coast during this period, alongside the design of the UPS headquarters in 1956. For his UPS distribution center in Seattle (constructed 1950–1951), he worked alongside Jack Christiansen, who engineered a thin-shelled concrete roof for the building.

== Personal life ==
From 1927 to 1930, Holmes was a member of the Seattle Fine Arts Society and the Seattle Art Museum Board. He was a member of the College Club of Seattle during the 1930s. In December 1917, he married Jane Ingram Lambuth. Jane died in 1975, and Holmes remarried to Janet Powell Tourtellotte the following year. Holmes died on July 18, 1986, in Seattle.

== Works ==
Designs by J. Lister Holmes
Name	Location	Date	Style	Ref.
Donovan House	Bellingham, Washington	1923–1925	Spanish Colonial Revival	
Rainier Golf and Country Club Clubhouse (addition)	1856 South 112th Street, Seattle, Washington	1922	-	
Lorraine Hotel	2327 2nd Avenue, Belltown, Seattle	1925	-	
Fisher House	3414 East Shore Drive, Broadmoor, Seattle, Washington	1926	Châteauesque	
Lawton House	Seattle, Washington	1926–1927	Tudor revival	
West Coast Woods Model Home	7211 N Fowler Avenue, Portland, Oregon	1927	"country cottage"	
Haslund House	Magnolia, Seattle, Washington	1929	-	
Sovereign Apartments	1317 Boren Avenue, First Hill, Seattle, Washington	1920s	-	
Dorchester Hotel	1007 Pike Street, Downtown Seattle, Washington	Late 1920s	-	
Phi Gamma Delta House	5404 17th Ave NE., University District, Seattle, Washington	1937	Tudor revival	
Holmes House	615 36th Ave E., Madison Park, Seattle, Washington	1928–1930	Norman style	
Collinswood	Bloedel Reserve, Bainbridge Island, Washington	1930–1932	Châteauesque	
Polsky House	Beaverton, Oregon	1932–1933	Tudor revival	
Jones House	Seattle, Washington	1936	Colonial Revival	
Baillargeon House	Seattle, Washington	1936–1937	Châteauesque	
Wiener Dental Clinic	Seattle, Washington	1936	International Style	
Fairwest Lithocraft Building	3rd Ave & Wall St., Denny Triangle, Seattle, Washington	1937	Modernist	
Dessau House	The Highlands, Shoreline, Washington	1937–1939	International Style, Northwest Regional	
Washington State Pavilion	Flushing Meadows–Corona Park, New York City	1938–1939	-	
Coulon House	Seattle, Washington	1939–1940	International Style, Northwest Regional	
433 Lake Washington Boulevard E. House	Denny-Blaine, Seattle, Washington	1941	Modernist	
Yesler Terrace	Yesler Terrace, Seattle, Washington	1940–1943	Modernist	
Rainier Vista School	Seattle, Washington	1942–1943	-	
Casserd House	433 Lake Washington Boulevard, Madrona, Seattle, Washington	1945–1946	-	
Industrial Branch of Seattle First National Bank, Seattle	Seattle, Washington	1945–1947	-	
Rubinstein House	Seattle, Washington	1945–1947	International Style, Northwest Regional	
Harvard Square Medical & Dental Clinic	Seattle, Washington	1946–1947	Modernist	
Seattle Public Schools Administration Building	815 Fourth Ave N., Queen Anne, Seattle, Washington	1946–1948	Modernist	
Culver House	Seattle, Washington	1948–1949	Modernist	
Catharine Blaine Junior High School	2550 34th Ave W., Magnolia, Seattle, Washington	1949–1952	Modernist	
UPS Sorting Building	Seattle, Washington	1950–1951	Modernist	
UPS Sorting Building	Pasadena, California	1951–1952	-	
UPS Sorting Building	San Diego, California	1951–1952	-	
UPS Headquarters	Los Angeles, California	1956	-	
Museum of History & Industry (addition)	2161 E. Hamlin St., Montlake, Seattle, Washington	1961	-	
UPS Sorting Building	San Francisco, California	1962–1963	-	
UPS Sorting Building	Los Angeles, California	1965	-	
UPS Complex	Seattle, Washington	1968–1970	-	
