= William Aitken (architect) =

Scottish-American architect (1889–1961)

- Born: September 9, 1889; Glasgow, Scotland, United Kingdom
- Died: July 22, 1961 (aged 71); Seattle, Washington, United States
- Education: Glasgow Technical College
- Spouse: Mary R. Walker (m. around 1910–1935); Mary Stauber (m. 1945)

William Aitken (September 9, 1889 – July 22, 1961) was a Scottish-American architect. Born in Glasgow, he attended school in Scotland before emigrating to Vancouver, Canada, before 1911. He crossed into the United States around 1915 and became a dock engineer for the Pacific Coast Company in Seattle. In 1919, he received his architecture license and began private practice, designing various buildings across western Washington from the 1920s to the early 1960s. Among his major works are Sick's Stadium, the host stadium of the Seattle Rainiers, and Yesler Terrace, Seattle's first public housing development, which was designed in collaboration with various other architects. Aitken retired in 1960 but continued working on some smaller projects, including the Captain's Table Restaurant for restaurateur Ivar Haglund. Some forty-five years after first immigrating to the United States, he received his American citizenship in 1961, shortly before his death of cancer in July of that year.

== Biography ==
On September 9, 1889, William Aitken was born in Glasgow, Scotland, to Margaret Faulds Stewart and William Robertson Aitken, a builder. As a child, he lived with his parents in the Shawlands suburb of Glasgow. He later lived in Eastwood with his family and several servants and attended Glasgow Technical College. By 1911, Aitken had become a citizen of Canada and settled in Vancouver, British Columbia. In 1914 or 1915, he migrated to the United States with his wife and daughter.

During World War I, Aitken worked as an engineer in Seattle for the Pacific Coast Company, designing wharves and docks. He received his architecture license in 1919 and began private practice, designing buildings across western Washington state. In 1922, he designed the Salem Lutheran Church in Mount Vernon and the Anna Wagner apartment building in Seattle. Other early works include the Phoenix Masonic Lodge in Sumner (1924), the Lincoln Theater in Mount Vernon (1926), and the J. M. Colman Company warehouse in Seattle (1930).

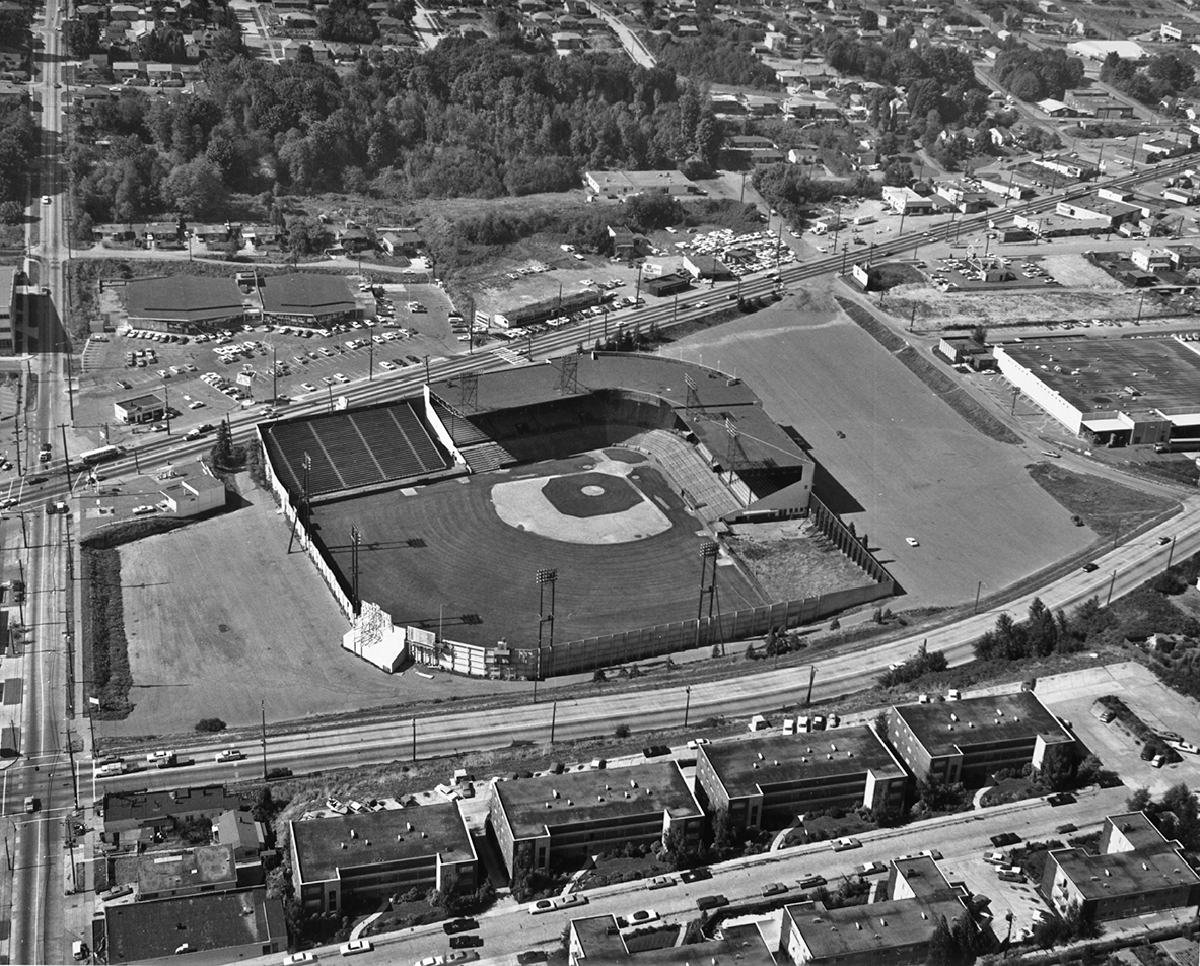
Aitken designed Sick's Stadium, the home stadium of the Seattle Rainiers.

In the early 1930s, he partnered with Alfred F. Moberg and began a series of designs in Port Angeles, Washington. These include a design for a city hall complex in 1930–1931, of which only a single building, a fire station, was ultimately constructed. He returned to Seattle in the late 1930s, where he designed Sick's Stadium, which hosted the city's minor league baseball team, the Seattle Rainiers. From 1939 to 1942, he partnered with George Wellington Stoddard, J. Lister Holmes, William J. Bain, and John T. Jacobsen to design Yesler Terrace, the first racially integrated public housing development in the United States. In 1952–1954, he designed Lakeview Elementary School on Mercer Island, Washington, in collaboration with Fred Bassetti and John M. Moorse.

After designing the Norman S. Wright Company Building in 1959–1960, Aitken retired. However, he continued to design a number of smaller projects during his short retirement, including Ivar Haglund's Captain's Table Restaurant and the Pacific Coast Coal & Oil Company Building, both in Seattle.

=== Personal life ===
Aitken married Mary R. Walker at some point prior to his migration to the United States, and with her had two children, Ethel and William. They divorced in 1935, and Aitken married fashion designer Mary Stauber in Seattle on July 26, 1943. That same year, he moved to Mercer Island. Although he initially filed for American citizenship in 1915, this was not ultimately pursued; he again applied for citizenship around 1960, receiving it on March 6, 1961, shortly before his death from cancer in Seattle on July 22, 1961.

== Works ==
Designs by William Aitken
Name	Location	Date	Ref.
Anna Wagner Apartment Building	Seattle, Washington	1922	
Salem Lutheran Church	Mount Vernon, Washington	1922	
Phoenix Masonic Lodge	Sumner, Washington	1924	
Quinault Apartments	Seattle, Washington	1925	
Lincoln Theater	Mount Vernon, Washington	1925–1926	
Harvard Crest Apartments	Seattle, Washington	1926–1927	
J. M. Colman Company Warehouse	Seattle, Washington	1930, 1940	
Sandison Bakery Building	Port Angeles, Washington	1930s	
M & S Realty Building	Port Angeles, Washington	1930s	
Port Angeles Fire Hall	Port Angeles, Washington	1930–1931	
R. C. Northfield Store	Seattle, Washington	1935	
Sick's Stadium	Seattle, Washington	1937–1938	
Northfield Building	Seattle, Washington	1939	
Yesler Terrace	Seattle, Washington	1939–1942	
Lakeview Elementary School	Mercer Island, Washington	1952–1954	
Norman S. Wright Co. Building	Seattle, Washington	1959–1960	
Pacific Coast Coal & Oil Co. Building	Seattle, Washington	1960	
Captain's Table Restaurant	Seattle, Washington	1960	
