= Victor N. J. Jones =

Canadian-American architect (1900–1969)

- Born: Victor Noble Jarrott Jones; April 21, 1900; Exeter, Ontario, Canada
- Died: December 14, 1969 (aged 69); Wailuku, Hawaii, United States
- Education: University of Washington (B.Arch), University of Pennsylvania (M.Arch)
- Occupation: Architect
- Era: 1926–1969

Victor Noble Jarrott Jones (April 21, 1900 – December 14, 1969) was a Canadian-American architect. Born in Exeter, Ontario, he immigrated to Seattle with his parents and attended the University of Washington, graduating in 1924. After receiving his Master of Architecture from the University of Pennsylvania in 1926, he worked for a number of local architects before returning to Seattle to work for the firm of Edward Pinneh and Robert F. McClelland. He left the firm to partner with J. Lister Holmes, and worked together with Carl Frelinghuysen Gould to design the Washington State Pavilion at the 1939 New York World's Fair. He founded an independent practice in 1942; over the late 1940s and 1950s, he designed a number of projects in Idaho, as well as campus buildings for the University of Washington and Washington State University. He designed the Overlake Memorial Hospital and the Seattle Ferry Terminal, both ultimately constructed after his retirement in 1959.

== Biography ==
On April 21, 1900, Victor Noble Jarrott Jones was born in Exeter, Ontario, Canada, the son of Catherine Anne and Richard Jones. His father immigrated to the United States around the time of his birth, with him and his mother following two years later. He attended Ballard High School in Seattle, graduating around 1918. He attended the University of Washington, where he was a member of the Atelier, a student architectural club. He graduated with a Bachelor of Architecture in 1924, and proceeded to the University of Pennsylvania in Philadelphia, graduating with a Master of Architecture in 1926.

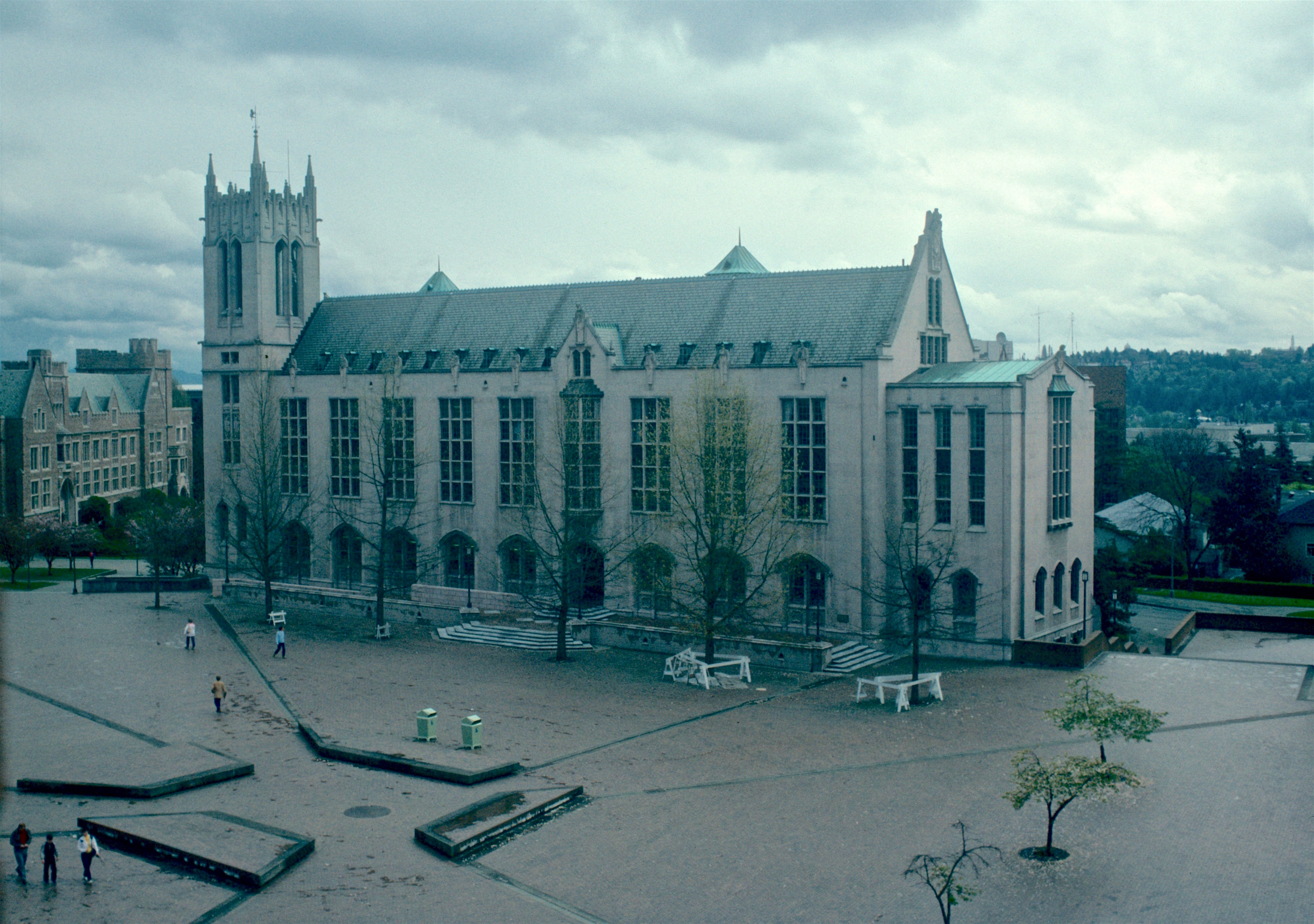
Jones designed Gerberding Hall alongside John T. Jacobsen.

After graduating from the University of Pennsylvania, he briefly worked for the firm of Wilson Eyre and John Gilbert McIlvaine, but transferred to work under Charles Z. Klauder later that same year. After a brief stay in the French city of Le Havre in 1927, he returned to Seattle in 1928 and began work for Edward Pinneh and Robert F. McClelland. He was promoted to a partner in 1930, forming the firm McClelland, Pinneh, and Jones; Pinneh left the partnership two years later. McClelland & Jones won an award for an Architectural Forum competition, and received several commissions for storefront remodels in Seattle and Bremerton. In 1939, he left the partnership with McClelland to partner with J. Lister Holmes. Holmes and Jones partnered with Carl Frelinghuysen Gould to design the Washington State Pavilion at the 1939 New York World's Fair. The Holmes & Jones partnership additionally incorporated B. Dudley Stuart in 1940, and received a commission for the West Seattle Defense Housing Project.

In 1942, he left Stuart, Holmes, & Jones to found his independent practice, Victor N. Jones & Associates. During the late 1940s he designed projects in Idaho, including the Boise Hills Village development and the McCall Shore Lodge. In 1950, he worked with John T. Jacobsen to design the Administration Building (now Gerberding Hall) of the University of Washington, featuring sculptures by Dudley Pratt. In 1949–1952, worked with NBBJ to design the First Medical School Building for the University of Washington School of Medicine. He designed the Veteran’s Housing Complex at Retsil in 1953.

In 1951, he took on three new partners: Lloyd Lovegren, Kenneth Helms, and Gayne Jones, forming the firm Jones, Lovegren, Helms & Jones. In 1953, the firm designed Neill Hall and Kruegel-McAllister Halls at Washington State University, Pullman. This was followed by the Overlake Memorial Hospital in Bellevue from 1957 to 1960 and the Seattle Ferry Terminal, which was built 1964–1967. The firm returned to Washington State University to design Johnson Hall, which was constructed in 1960. Jones retired from architecture in 1959.

== Personal life ==
Jones was a member of the Seattle chapter of the American Institute of Architects, serving as its secretary from 1938 to 1942 and its president during 1945. He married twice and had two children. He died in Wailuku, Hawaii, on December 14, 1969.
