= Memorial Stadium (Seattle) =

Sports venue in Seattle, United States

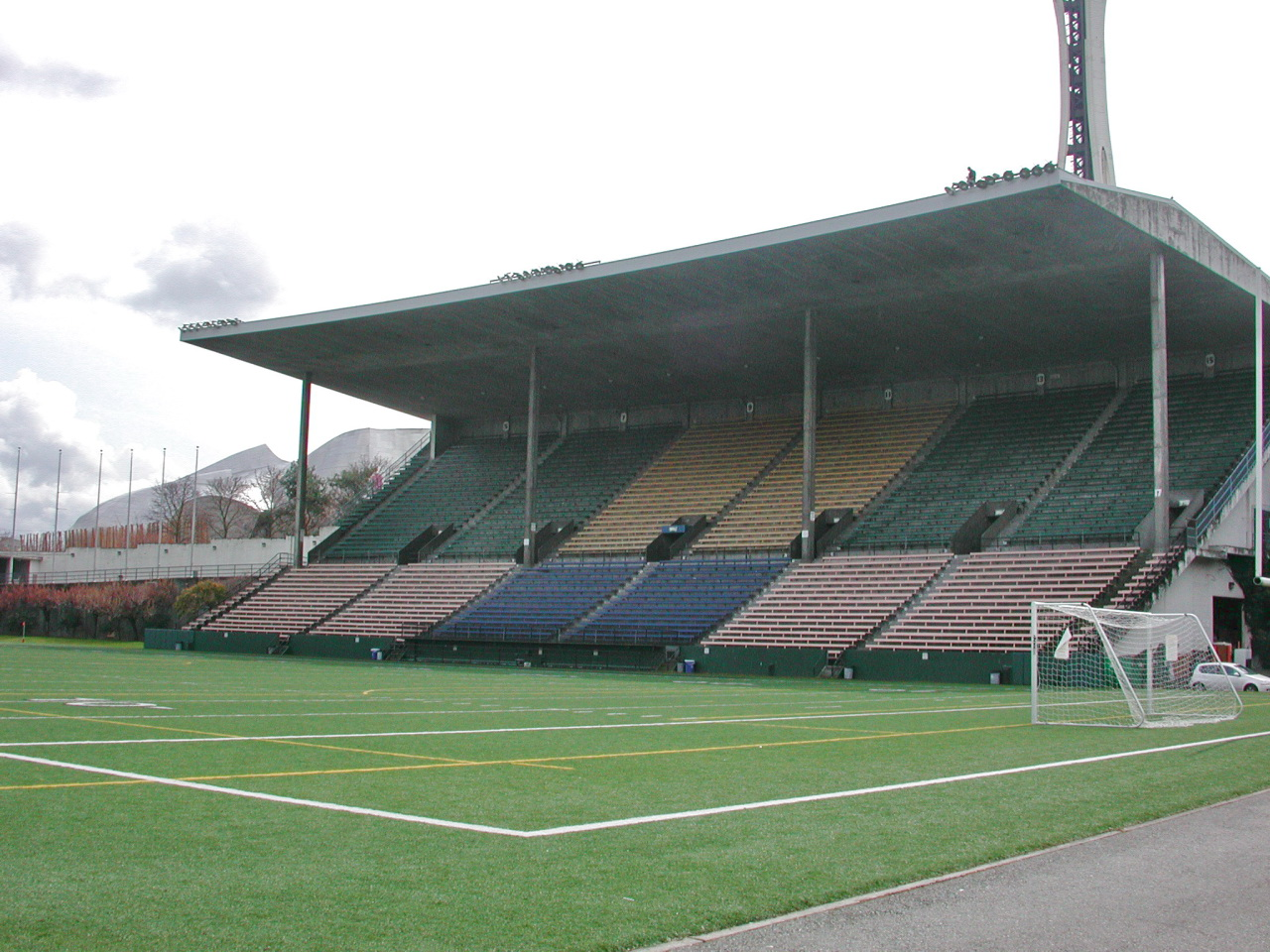
- View from northwest in 2008

- Location in the United States Location in Washington
- Interactive map of Memorial Stadium
- Full name: Seattle High School Memorial Stadium
- Address: 401 5th Ave N.
- Location: Seattle, Washington, U.S.
- Coordinates: 47.623°N 122.350°W
- Elevation: 100 ft (30 m)
- Owner: Seattle School District
- Capacity: 12,000
- Surface: AstroTurf
- Public transit: Seattle Center

Construction
- Groundbreaking: 1946
- Opened: September 26, 1947
- Closed: 2025
- Architect: George W. Stoddard

Tenants
- Seattle School District football (1947–2025); Seattle Sounders (NASL) (1974–1975); Seattle Sounders (APSL/A-League) (1994–1997, 2001–2002); Seattle Majestics (IWFL) (2007–2009); Seattle Reign FC (NWSL) (2014–2018); Seattle Cascades (AUDL) (2015–2025); Ballard FC (USL2) (2024)

Seattle High School Memorial Stadium, commonly known simply as Memorial Stadium, was an outdoor athletic stadium in Seattle, Washington, located in the northeast corner of the Seattle Center grounds. It was used mostly for American football, soccer, ultimate frisbee, and concerts from 1947 to 2025. In its final configuration, the stadium had a seating capacity of 12,000.

The stadium opened in 1947 on the site of Seattle's former Civic Field, built as a memorial to the Seattle Public Schools pupils killed in the Second World War. A memorial wall listing the names of 762 students was dedicated in 1951. The stadium was built for Seattle School District high school sports, including the annual Metro League football championship, and continued to be used for Seattle school district competitions and adult recreational leagues until its closure in 2024. Several events at the Century 21 Exposition in 1962, including the world's fair opening ceremonies, were held at Memorial Stadium.

Memorial Stadium was also home to several professional sports teams, beginning with the Seattle Sounders of the North American Soccer League from 1974 to 1975. The seating capacity was temporarily expanded to 17,000 during the team's two-year stay at the stadium while waiting for the Kingdome to open. Similarly, an A-League reincarnation of the Sounders franchise played at Memorial Stadium, before moving to Seahawks Stadium in 2002. It was also the home stadium for Seattle Reign FC of the National Women's Soccer League from 2014 to 2018, as well as the Seattle Cascades of the Ultimate Frisbee Association (UFA).

== History ==
The stadium was designed by Seattle architect George W. Stoddard, also known for his work on the Green Lake Aqua Theater and the south stands of Husky Stadium. The stadium opened on September 26, 1947, during a "jamboree" featuring eight of the city's high school football teams. Seattle High School Memorial Stadium was dedicated later that year in memory of the Seattle youth who gave their lives in World War II. A memorial wall at the east end is inscribed with the names of over 700 fallen individuals. The following year, the stadium hosted the first widespread local television broadcast in the Puget Sound region: the Turkey Day high school football game between West Seattle and Wenatchee, televised on November 25 by KRSC-TV (later KING-TV).

The stadium was the venue for much of the opening ceremonies for the Century 21 Exposition, a World's Fair held in Seattle in 1962. In 1967, it became the first high school stadium in the country to install artificial turf. After several sellouts for the Seattle Sounders in their inaugural North American Soccer League season, a set of temporary bleachers were installed in the stadium to increase capacity to 17,925 in 1975. For soccer matches, the pitch at Memorial Stadium was 110 yards (100 m) long and 60 yards (55 m) wide. The Sounders moved to the Kingdome at the end of the 1975 season after attempts to negotiate for a long-term lease and management of the stadium with the Seattle School District were unsuccessful.

In 1992, the scoreboard was replaced and the field was rededicated as "Leon H. Brigham Field", in tribute to the long-time high school football coach who pushed to build Memorial Stadium while serving as the Seattle School District's first director of athletics. The scoreboard was again replaced in 2018. Plans to replace the turf surface and widen the field area were also announced prior to a visit by Major League Soccer officials in 1994 to determine its suitability to host a Seattle team. Memorial Stadium was renovated in 1999, forcing the Sounders to move to Renton Memorial Stadium for one season.

== Tenants ==
The facility was not operated by the Seattle Center itself, but is owned by the Seattle School District and served as the "home field" for some high school football games played within the district. Memorial Stadium also hosted the first AAA (now 4A) state championship game for high school football in 1973, the first year of the state playoff system. The top-ranked Wenatchee Panthers were upset by the Kentridge Chargers, 26–24. Entering the title game, Wenatchee had given up just seven points all season and had been the top team in the state polls for four years. The stadium hosted the annual football championships for the Metro League, which were traditionally played on Thanksgiving Day.

As well as hosting two iterations of the Sounders franchise, Memorial Stadium served as home to several other pro and semi-pro sports teams. From 1967 to 1969 it was the home of the Seattle Rangers of the Continental Football League, a professional minor league. The Seattle Majestics, a women's American football team, played home games at Memorial Stadium from 2007 to 2009 before moving to French Field in nearby Kent. Seattle Reign FC of the National Women's Soccer League moved to the stadium in 2014 and played with a capacity limited to 6,000 for several seasons. They announced their move to Tacoma in January 2019 and then to Lumen Field in 2022. The American Ultimate Disc League's Seattle Cascades used the stadium for the majority of their home games from 2015 to 2025. In addition, the stadium hosted adult recreational league soccer and flag football.

Memorial Stadium served as the finish for the Seattle Marathon. The stadium has also hosted political and religious events, including five weeks of Billy Graham sermons in 1951 and a speech during the 1999 WTO protests.

=== Concerts ===
The stadium was also used periodically for concerts, particularly in connection with festivals held at the Seattle Center, like Bumbershoot. In late May 1995, The Grateful Dead performed their final three Seattle shows; they disbanded after Jerry Garcia died later that year.

== Replacement project ==
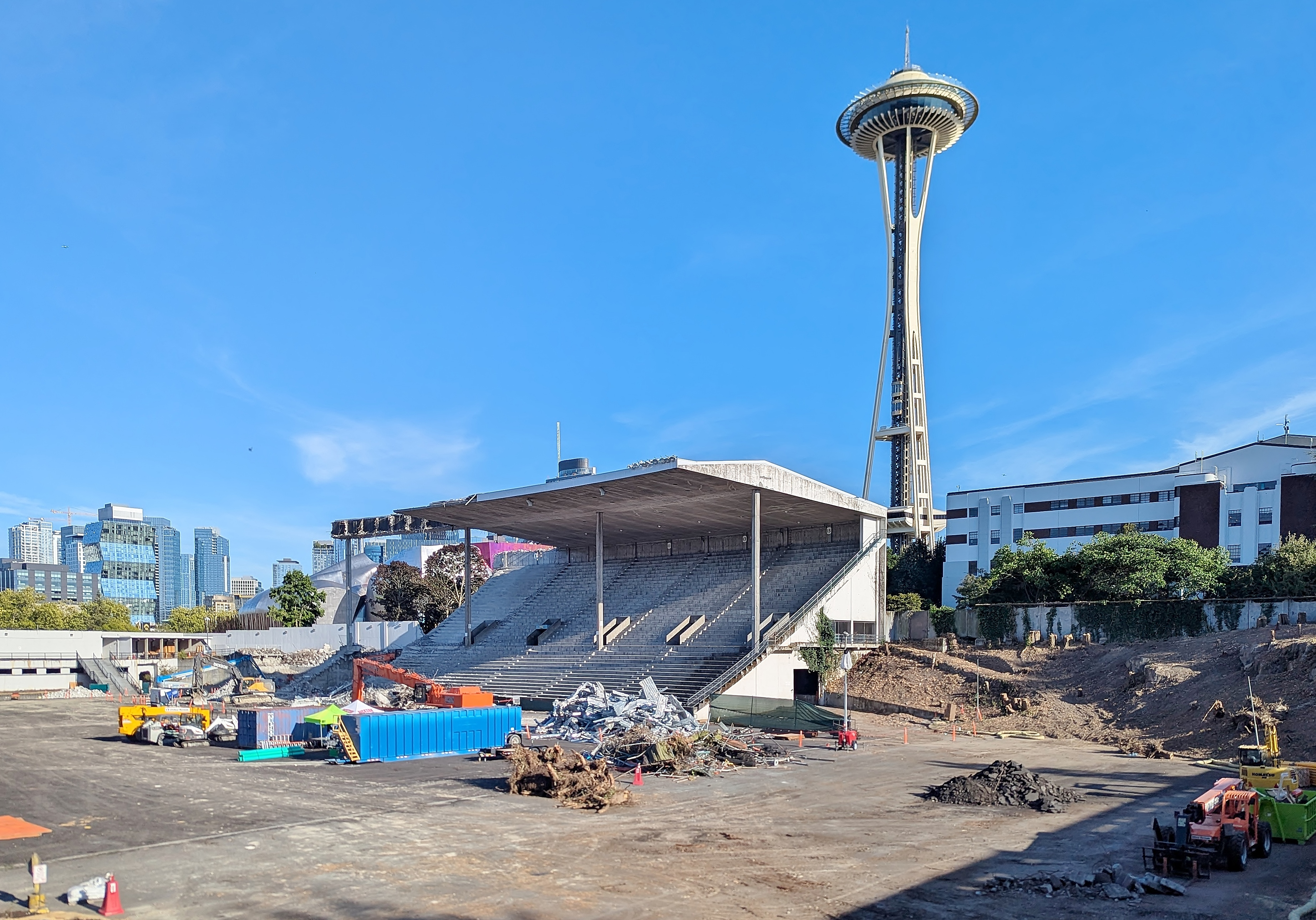
Demolition of the south stand in August 2025

Plans to renovate or modernize Memorial Stadium emerged in the 1990s, but were shelved due to a lack of funding and other issues. In 2017, the Seattle School District and the city of Seattle announced plans to build a new high school and stadium at Seattle Center in response to major population growth in downtown Seattle. While no timetable had been set for construction, and no site had yet been chosen, the current Memorial Stadium site was seen as a likely location for the new project because the city and school district had agreed in 2009 that the current stadium should be torn down. In October 2018, a design studio leaked renderings of a soccer-specific stadium on the site of Memorial Stadium that was commissioned for a feasibility study.

In March 2023, Seattle Public Schools and the City of Seattle issued a request for proposals to renovate or replace the stadium. It proposes a design with at least 8,000 seats that removes view-obstructing walls and connects with the International Fountain to the direct west. The project would include $87.5 million in public funding from the city government and school district, the latter of which was approved through a 2022 property tax levy, along with other contributions from the state government. The private bidder would pay for the remaining construction costs and operate the venue, which would be used for school sports as well as concerts and cultural events beginning in 2027. Several professional teams, including Seattle Reign FC and the Seattle Seawolves of Major League Rugby, have been mentioned as potential tenants. An earlier completion in 2026 was also proposed so that the stadium would be used as a training facility during the 2026 FIFA World Cup, but was not realized.

Two proposals were presented in May 2023 to the city and school district, who planned to evaluate the proposals by the end of the month. The One Roof Partnership, a partnership between the Seattle Kraken and Oak View Group (the operator of the redeveloped Climate Pledge Arena), proposed a stadium with four stands and seats for 10,000 spectators; its design was inspired by a stadium in Kansas City, Missouri, that was being constructed for the Kansas City Current of the National Women's Soccer League. A separate bid from JLL, Poag Development Group, and the Anschutz Entertainment Group included a semi-covered grandstand and a wrapped facade. The city and school district announced their selection of the One Roof Partnership as their preferred bidder on June 15. A total of $30 million in donations were collected by the One Roof Partnership to fill a funding gap not covered by $110 million from public sources.

The February 2025 plan from Generator Studio and GGLO comprises a stadium with 6,500 seats and capacity for 8,000 total spectators with covered seating on three sides and an uncovered berm on the west side. Multiple courtyards are planned to be added around the Memorial Wall and concourses on the east and west sides. A public "farewell" event was held in June 2025 ahead of demolition. The new Memorial Stadium is scheduled to open in September 2027.
