= Yesler Way =

Street in Seattle, Washington

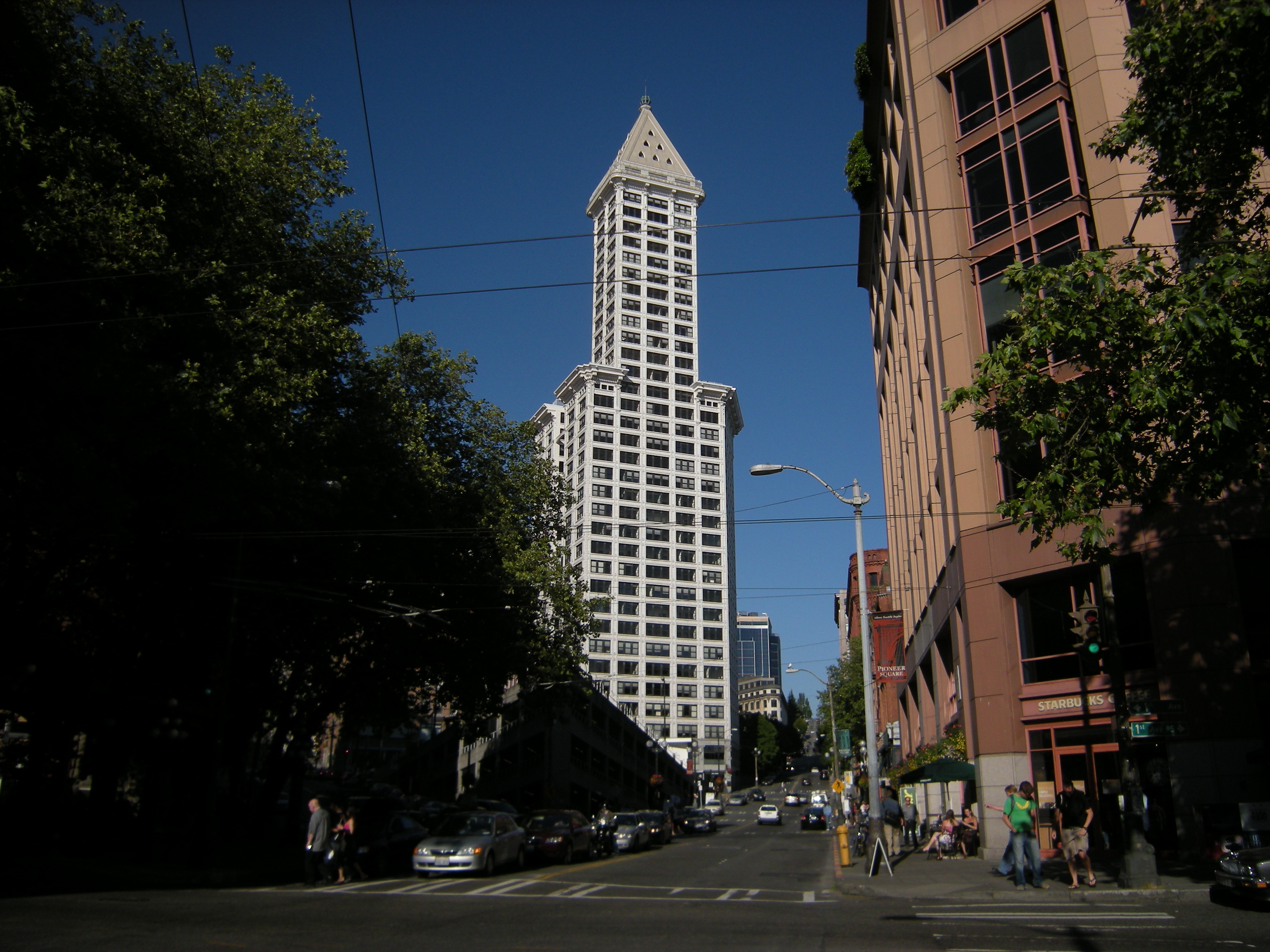
- Yesler Way at 1st Avenue, looking east from the bottom of the hill.
- Former name: Mill Street
- Namesake: Henry Yesler
- Maintained by: Seattle Department of Transportation
- Length: 2.2 mi (3.5 km)
- Location: Seattle
- West end: Alaskan Way at Colman Dock
- Major junctions: Broadway at Yesler Terrace
- East end: Leschi Park

Yesler Way is an east–west street in Seattle named for Henry Yesler, the founder of Seattle. East–west streets in Seattle south of Yesler Way are prefixed "South"; avenues are suffixed with "South" as they cross Yesler Way. The street originates at Alaskan Way on the downtown Seattle waterfront and runs east through Yesler Terrace, the Central District, and Leschi to just east of 32nd Avenue, where the arterial route switches to Lake Dell Avenue. A short residential segment of East Yesler Way, which turns into east of Broadway, exists to the west of Lake Washington Boulevard.

== History ==
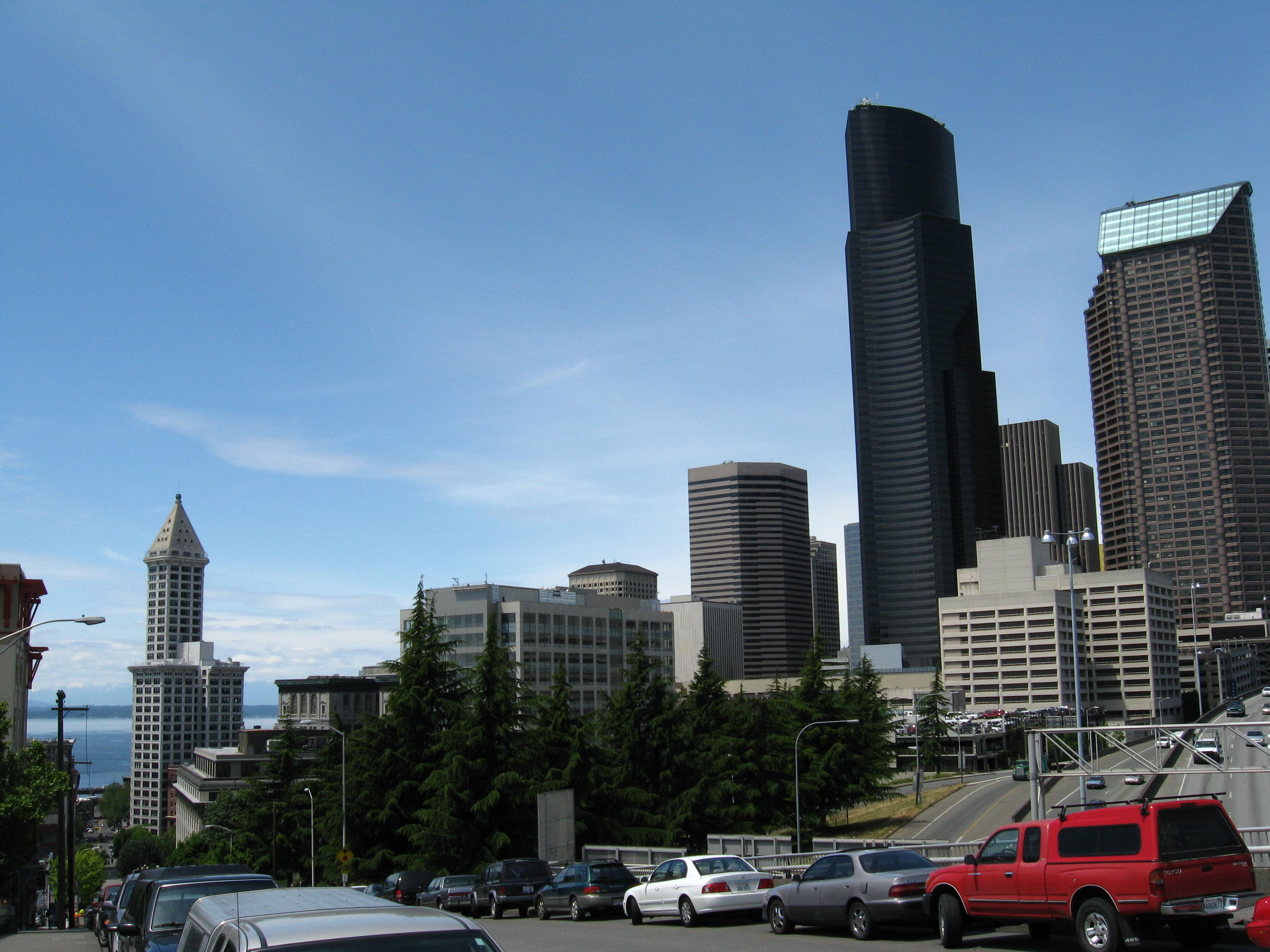
Westbound on Yesler Way as it crosses over I-5.

The line today followed by Yesler Way originally served to demarcate a place where two conflicting surveying efforts met. In the 1850s Arthur Denny and David Maynard, each working independently using different methods, created plats for the settlement that did not neatly overlay. To eventually settle the claims, the two plats were split along this line, with the southern portion following Maynard's east-west layout and the northern portion following the Denny approach of following the shoreline. With the line established, a street formed. When freshly cut logs were sent down the steep street, the street was referred to as Skid Road, which became genericized as Skid Row in other cities. Another nickname for the street was "dead line" circa the 1890s.

The street was renamed Yesler Way and later paved by Patrick J. McHugh in 1903.

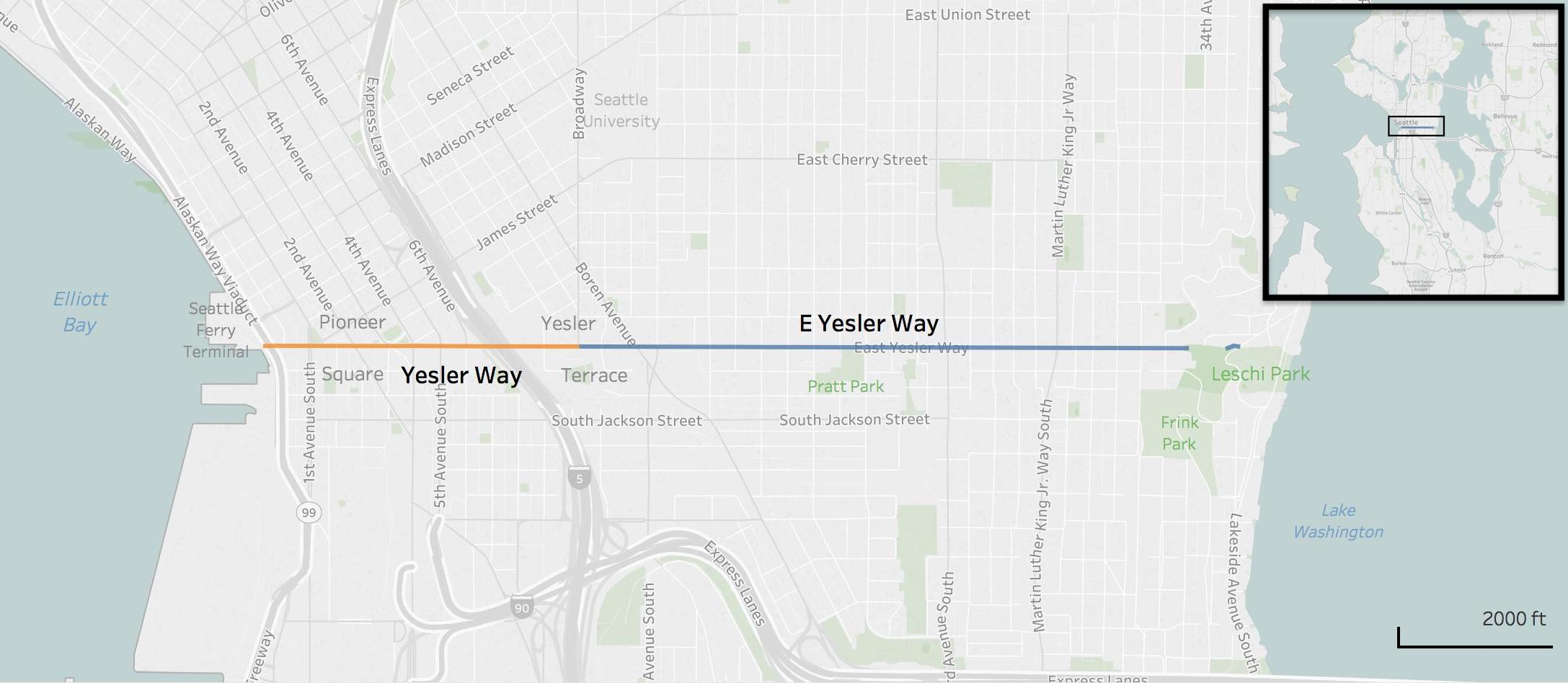
Yesler Way (orange) and E. Yesler Way (blue)
