= West Coast Woods Model Home =

Historic building in Portland, Oregon, U.S.

- U.S. National Register of Historic Places
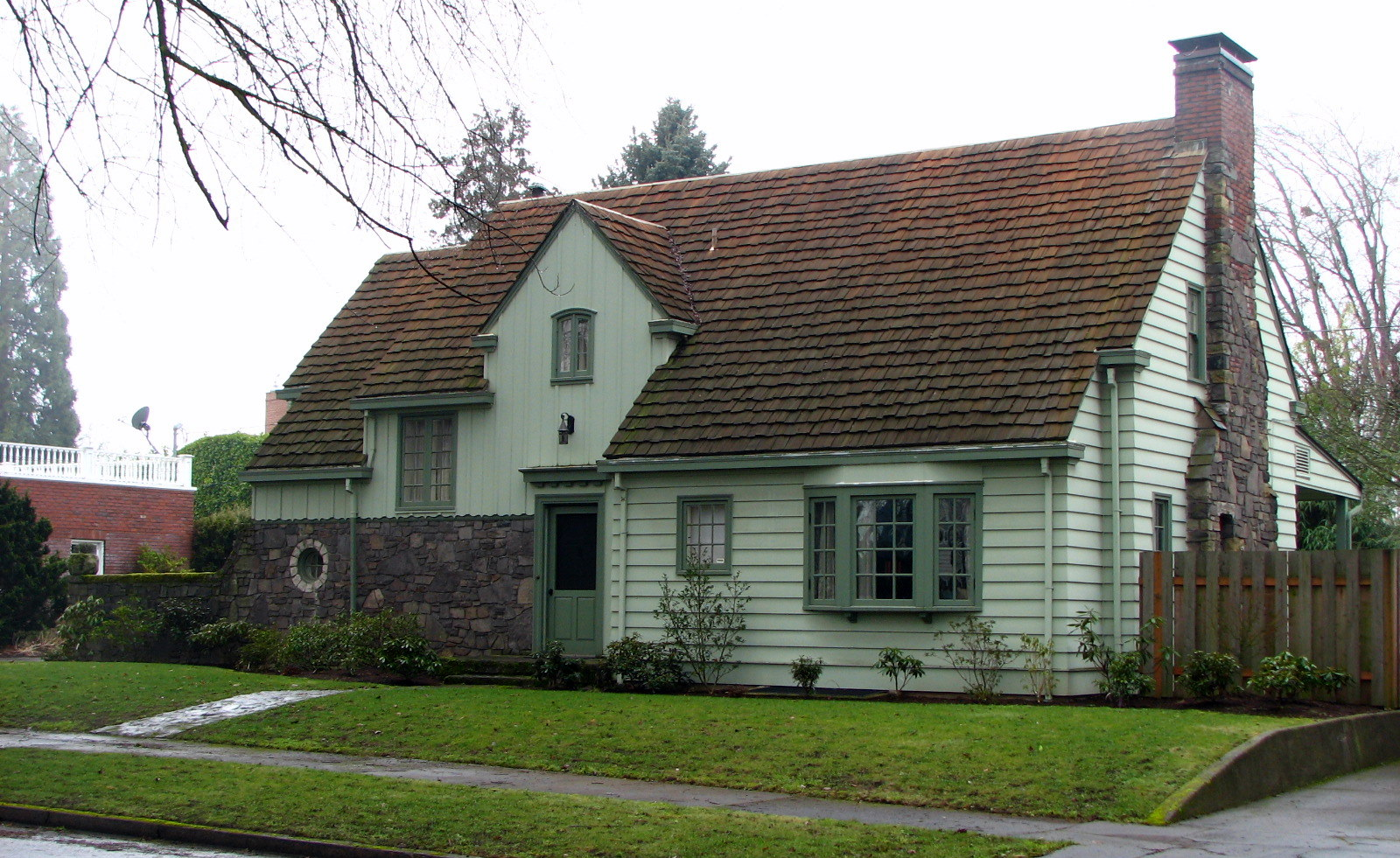
- West Coast Woods Model Home in 2009

- Location within Portland, Oregon
- Location: 7211 N. Fowler Ave., Portland, Oregon
- Coordinates: 45°34′31″N 122°42′26″W
- Area: less than one acre
- Built: 1927
- Architect: J. Lister Holmes, Otho McCracken
- Architectural style: Bungalow/Craftsman
- NRHP reference No.: 02000969
- Added to NRHP: September 14, 2002

The West Coast Woods Model Home, located in north Portland, Oregon, is listed on the National Register of Historic Places.

== See also ==
- National Register of Historic Places listings in North Portland, Oregon
