= College Club of Seattle =

Private club in Seattle, Washington

College Club Seattle
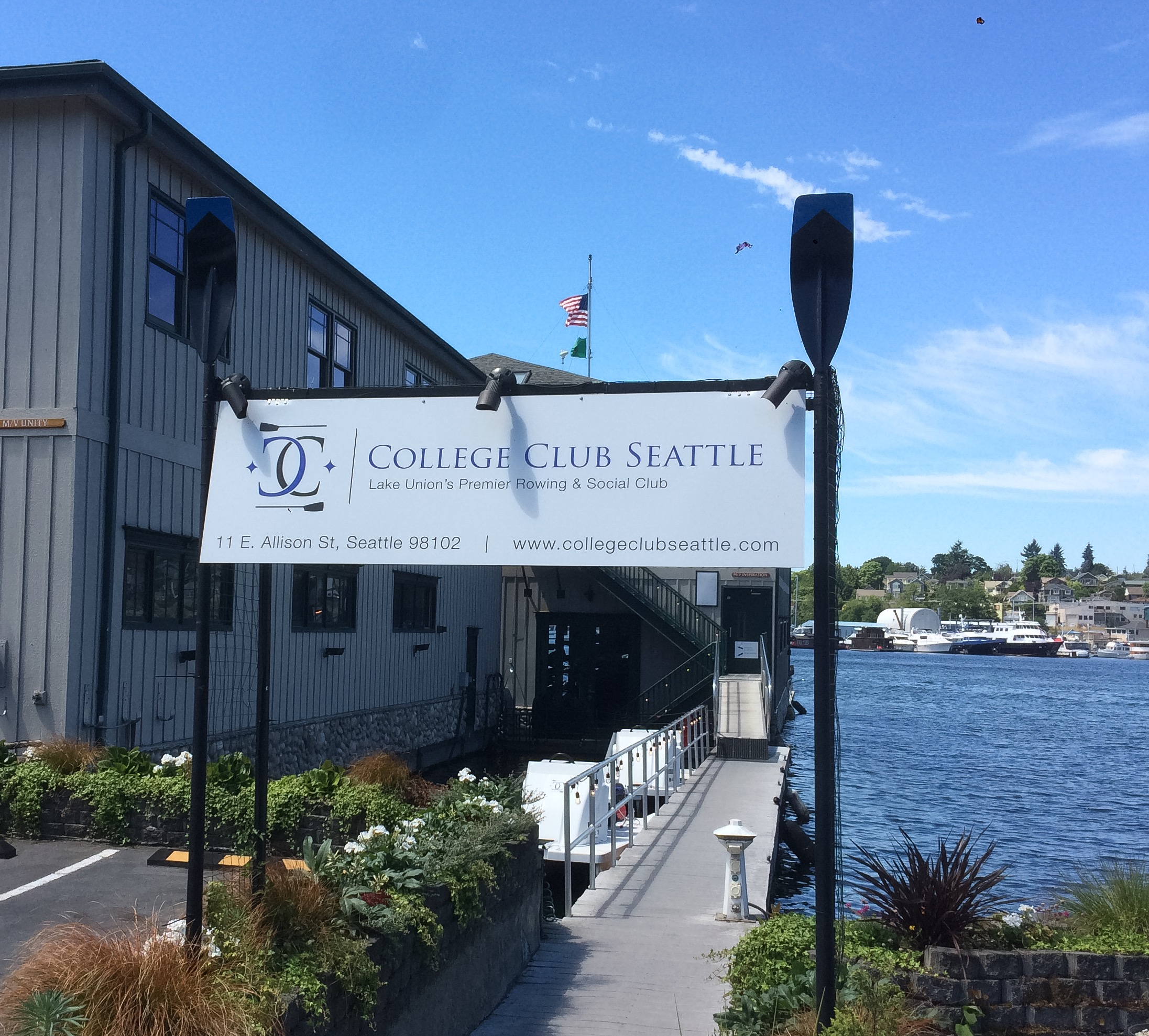
- Interactive map of the College Club Seattle area
- Former names: Lake Union Crew (1998–2014)

General information
- Type: Private club
- Location: 11 E. Allison Street; Seattle, Washington
- Coordinates: 47.644347°N 122.3226459°W
- Completed: 1998

Technical details
- Floor count: 3
- Lifts/elevators: 1

College Club Seattle is a private member's club, business meeting space, rowing club, social club, and gym on Lake Union in Seattle, Washington.

== History ==
The club was founded in 1910 by five Yale graduates (Thomas Babcock, Ralph Angell, St. Clair Dickinson, Bob Forbes and Bob Chase) and one graduate from the University of Wisconsin. After signing up 50 members and choosing a president by the name of Charles P. Spooner, a Princeton graduate with a law degree from Wisconsin and on the University of Washington Board of Regents, the club moved into a rented suite of rooms on the second floor of the old federal court building on the corner of Fourth Ave. and Marion Street. With a growing membership, the club outgrew this space in 1912 and hired the Metropolitan Building Company to build them a new home on the corner of Fifth Avenue and Seneca Streets, which they shared with the Women's University Club until 1921. Once again, the College Club outgrew their space and a new building was erected on Sixth Avenue and Spring Street. This building served as the club's home until 1962 when plans for the new I-5 freeway called for its removal. The club had previously purchased a lot at 505 Madison Street for $100,000 in 1954 and a new building was erected there. This would serve as the club's longest home until it was sold to a developer in 2007 and the club moved temporarily into the Columbia Tower Club through 2013. In 2013, the club purchased two houseboats on the NE shores of Seattle's Lake Union where it currently operates as a private rowing, kayaking, paddleboarding, swimming, and social club.

== Modern Day ==
Although founded as a private men's club in downtown Seattle, the changing demographics of in-city clubs resulted in a significant decrease in the club's membership roster from a high of 1,200 in 1990 to just over 450 today. As a result, the club abandoned the traditional private club model and has since moved onto two houseboats on the NE shores of Lake Union where it currently operates as a private member's club and event venue. The two houseboats are called the M/V Unity and the M/V Inspiration. The Unity, the smaller of the two vessels and the one closer to land, contains three floors, each measuring 70' by 32' (6,720 total sq. ft.) The Inspiration has two floors measuring 54' by 70' and a third-floor, two-bedroom caretaker's apartment measuring 15' by 31' (8,025 total sq. ft.) Together, the two boats contain 14,745 sq. ft. of space.

== Gallery ==
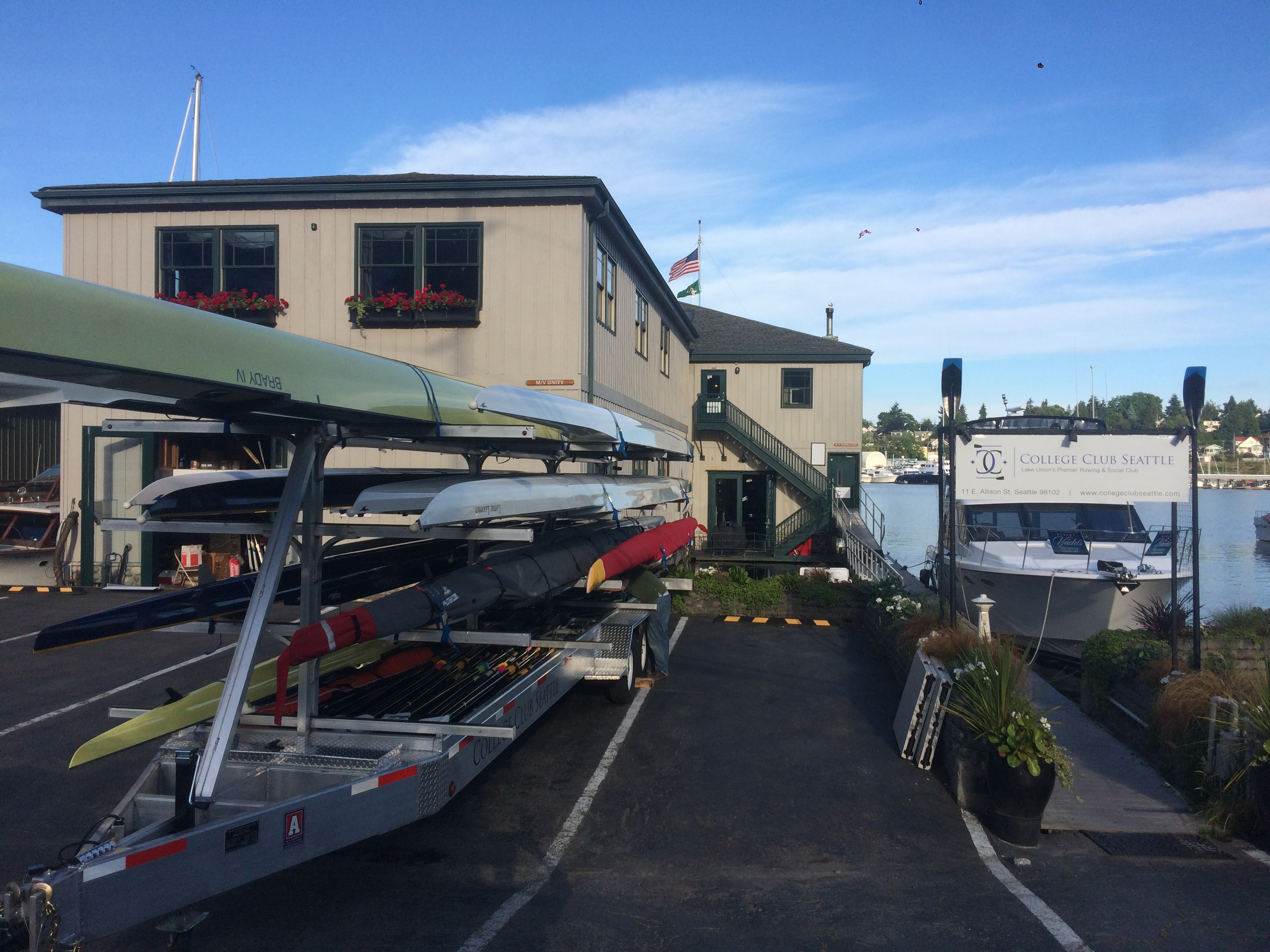
view of club from parking lot with fully loaded boat trailer in front

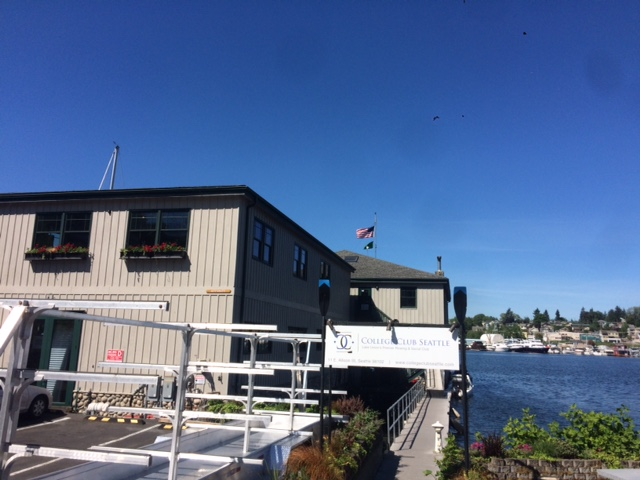
view of club from parking lot with empty boat trailer in front

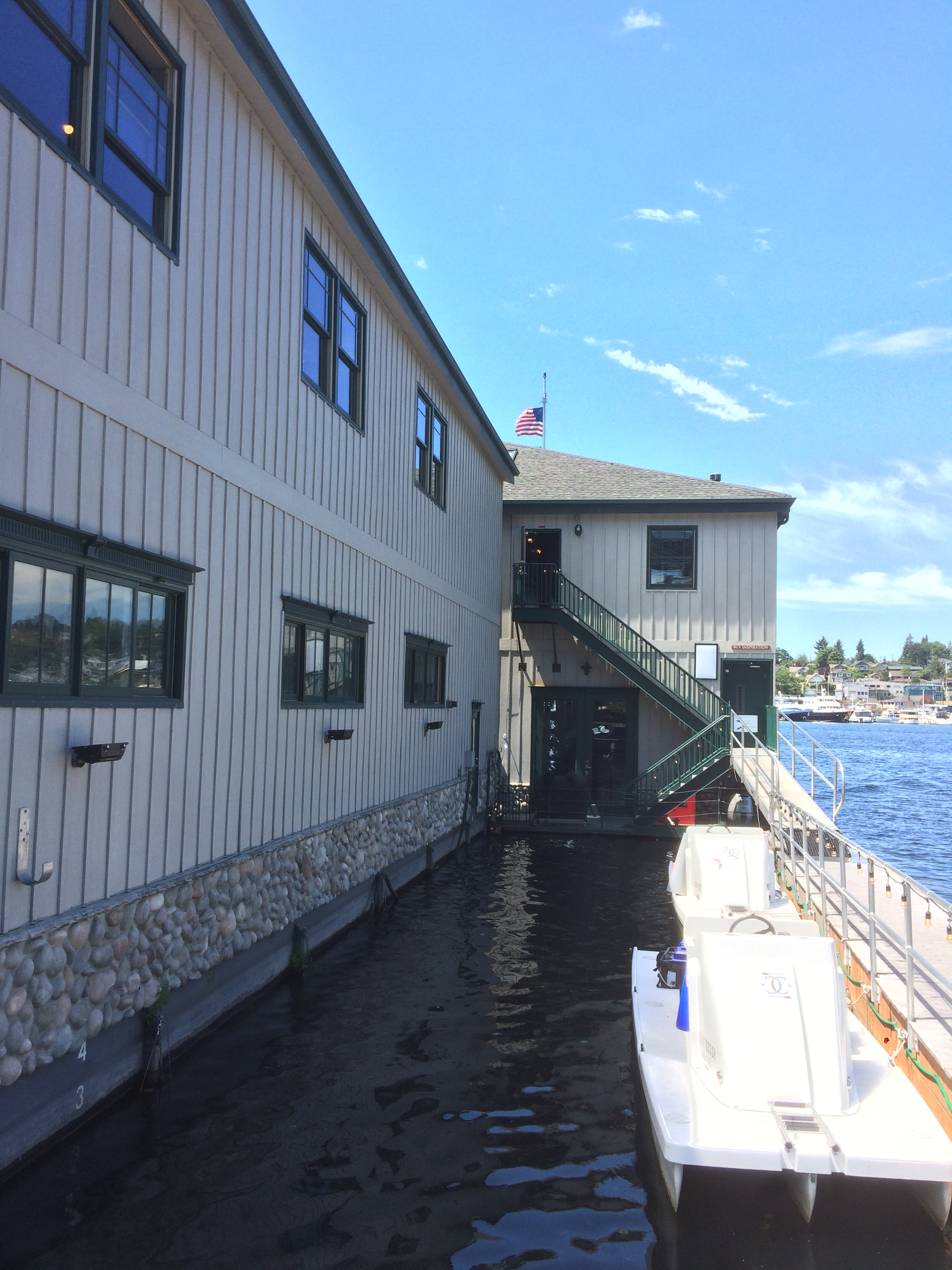
College Club (view of waterway alongside MV Unity)

== See also ==
- List of American gentlemen's clubs
