= John T. Jacobsen =

American architect (1903–1998)

John Theodore Jacobsen
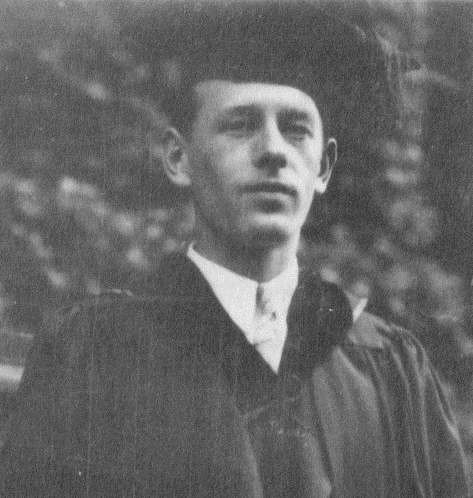
- Jacobsen in 1926
- Born: February 20, 1903; Seattle, Washington, United States
- Died: March 6, 1998 (aged 95); Honolulu, Hawaii, United States
- Resting place: Mount Pleasant Cemetery, Seattle
- Occupation: Architect
- Era: 1926–1970s
- Style: Northwest Regional style

John Theodore Jacobsen (February 20, 1903 – March 6, 1998) was an American architect active in the Pacific Northwest and Hawaii. Born in Seattle, Jacobsen studied architecture at the University of Washington and the University of Pennsylvania during the early 1920s. He traveled to the Soviet Union in 1926, where he designed several schools, before embarking on travels in Europe, South America, and Africa. He studied fresco painting in France before returning to the United States, where he worked for a period at architectural firms in New York City and at Colonial Williamsburg. Returning to Seattle in 1932, he designed bas-relief murals before becoming an instructor at the University of Washington and beginning private practice.

In 1938, he traveled across Scandinavia on an American Institute of Architects scholarship, where he studied modern housing developments. He worked on a number of housing projects on his return, including the Yesler Terrace housing project. After a period of work alongside Victor N. J. Jones in the late 1940s, he moved to Hawaii, where he designed many of Honolulu's early high-rises as the resident architect of John Graham & Company. He returned to private practice in the 1960s and 1970s, where he designed the Maui retirement residence of Charles Lindbergh and facilities at Sea Life Park Hawaii. He took an interest in architectural conservation in Hawaii, traveling across the islands to document historic sites for the National Register of Historic Places.

== Biography ==
On February 20, 1903, John Theodore Jacobsen was born in Seattle to Barbara Mae Amunds Jacobsen and John Peter Jacobsen. His father was a Danish immigrant to the United States who had become a prominent local businessman; he owned the Oregon Hotel in downtown Seattle, served as the Danish Vice-Consul in Seattle, and received Danish knighthood. Jacobsen's mother died when he was two years old, and he spent much of his childhood with his father, stepmother, and their two servants. By 1920, the family lived in Des Moines, Washington.

Jacobsen began attending the University of Washington in the early 1920s, where he studied under Carl F. Gould, receiving a Bachelor of Architecture from the school in 1924. After this, he transferred to the University of Pennsylvania in Philadelphia to pursue a Master of Architecture, which he obtained in 1926. While in Philadelphia, he briefly worked for the firm of architect Charles Klauder. After graduation he traveled to the Soviet Union, where he designed several schools. This began several years of travel across Europe, South America, and Africa. In 1928 he attended a summer program in Fontainebleau, France, where he studied fresco painting. He returned to the United States around 1929. He worked at various architectural firms in New York City, including under Ely Jacques Kahn for a brief period. He assisted with the reconstruction of Colonial Williamsburg in 1931, before returning to Seattle.

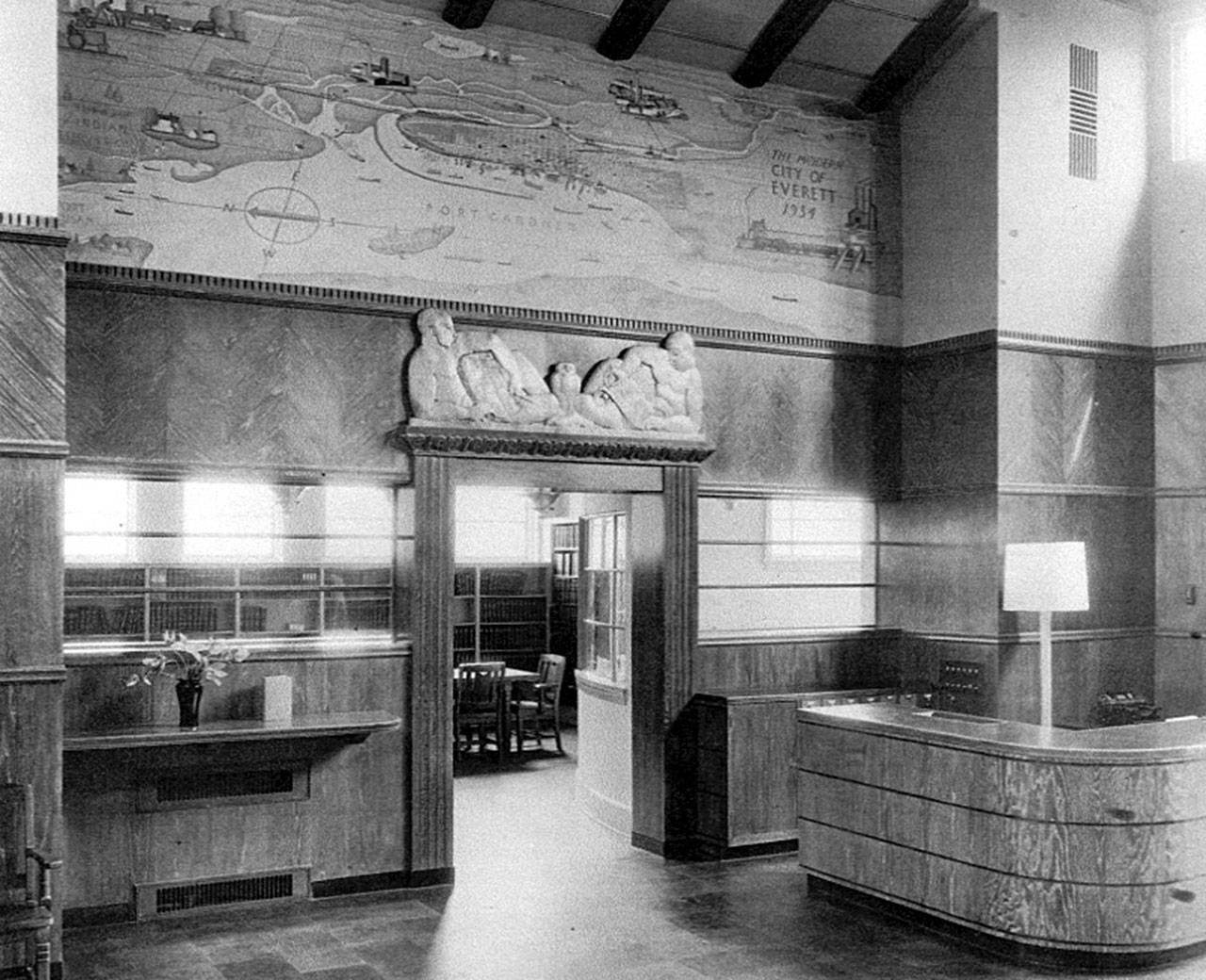
Mural by Jacobsen in the Everett Public Library, 1934

From 1932 to 1936, Jacobsen worked at the firm of Robert F. McClelland and Victor N. J. Jones. While employed at McClelland & Jones, he designed large-scale bas-relief murals at the Everett Public Library and the University of Washington's Suzzallo Library. By 1936, he became an instructor at the University of Washington and began private architectural practice. He gained attention for the design of his own house in Madison Park, alongside various other residences in Seattle over the course of the 1930s. He became one of the main contributors to the emerging Northwest Regional modernist style, with work featured in a variety of contemporary architectural publications such as Pacific Architect & Builder.

Jacobsen was nominated for and received a Langley Scholarship from the American Institute of Architects in 1938, with which he traveled across Scandinavia studying housing developments; this would go on to strongly influence his architectural philosophy. From 1939 to 1942, he worked alongside a wide group of other local architects in designing Yesler Terrace, the first racially-integrated public housing project in the United States. He also worked on the Stewart Heights housing project in Kirkland, Washington, in 1941–1942, on a site now occupied by Northwest University.

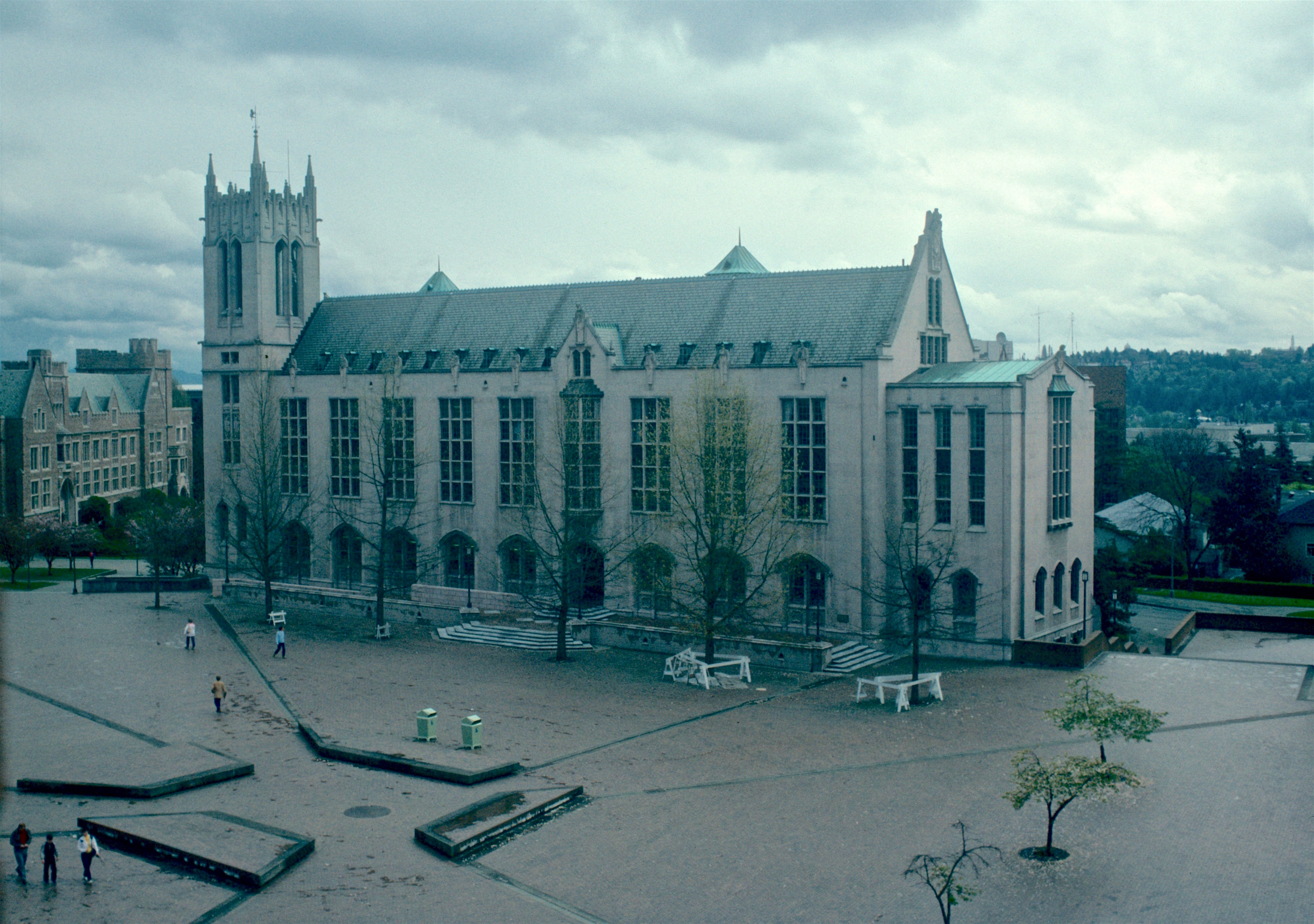
Gerberding Hall at the University of Washington

From 1942 to 1945, Jacobsen worked alongside Earl W. Morrison. After this, he returned to working with Victor Jones, with whom he designed the Bannock County Hospital in Pocatello, Gerberding Hall at the University of Washington, and the Richmond Highlands branch of the Seattle Trust & Savings Bank in Shoreline. He moved with his family to Hawaii during the 1950s, where he became the resident architect of John Graham & Company, with whom he designed the Ilikai Hotel and the Ala Moana Shopping Center. He worked with developer Lloyd Martin to construct a number of Honolulu's early high-rises, including the Admiral Cook Apartment Hotel in Waikiki. He then returned again to private practice in the late 1960s and 1970s, designing the research facilities of Sea Life Park Hawaii, and the retirement home of aviator Charles Lindbergh in Hana, Maui.

During Jacobsen's time in Hawaii, he took a strong interest in architectural conservation. He took a survey of historic churches in Maui, and worked with the Bishop Museum as a historic architecture specialist. In 1969, he compiled the Lahaina Architectural Style Book, which set design standards for buildings and infrastructure in Lahaina. He traveled across Hawaii in 1974 to document and list various sites on the National Register of Historic Places.

=== Personal life ===
In 1931, Jacobsen married Priscilla Chase in Peterborough, New Hampshire. They had twin daughters before Priscilla's death in California in 1942. In 1945, Jacobsen married his figure skating partner Florence Louise Bull in Seattle; the two would also go on to have two daughters. Jacobsen died in Honolulu on March 6, 1998. He was buried at the Mount Pleasant Cemetery in Seattle.

== Works ==
Works by John T. Jacobsen
Name	Location	Date	Ref.
Robert & Margaret Minshall House	Seattle, Washington	1936	
Jacobsen House	Seattle, Washington	1936	
George P. Norton House	6802 51st Avenue NE, Seattle, Washington	1938	
Dudley Pratt House (addition)	Seattle, Washington	1939	
Goslin House	Seattle, Washington	1939	
Andrew Gunby House	1118 Roanoke Street, Seattle, Washington	1939	
C. E. Strother House	Seattle, Washington	1939	
Yesler Terrace housing project	Seattle, Washington	1939–1942	
Stewart Heights housing project	Kirkland, Washington	1941–1942	
Bannock County Hospital	Pocatello, Idaho	1946	
Armbruster House	Seattle, Washington	1946	
Gerberding Hall	University of Washington, Seattle, Washington	1947–1950	
Miller Hall	Bush School, Seattle, Washington	1948	
Richmond Highlands Branch, Seattle Trust & Savings Bank	Shoreline, Washington	1954	
Jacobsen House	2189 Roundtop Drive, Makiki, Honolulu, Hawaii	1957	
Ala Moana Shopping Center	Honolulu, Hawaii	1958–1960	
Ilikai Hotel	Waikiki, Honolulu, Hawaii	1962–1964	
Sea Life Park	41–202 Kalanianaole Highway, Waimānalo, Hawaii	1964	
Charles Lindbergh House	Hana, Hawaii	1971	
Town House Apartments	Honolulu, Hawaii	–	
Admiral Cook Apartments	Waikiki, Honolulu, Hawaii	–	
Arcadia Retirement Residences	Honolulu, Hawaii	–	
Gold Bond Building	Honolulu, Hawaii	–	
Hawaii Yacht Club	1739 Ala Moana Boulevard, Waikiki, Honolulu, Hawaii	–	
Rosalie Apartments	Honolulu, Hawaii	–	
