= Green Lake Aqua Theater =

Coordinates: 47.6716°N 122.3426°W

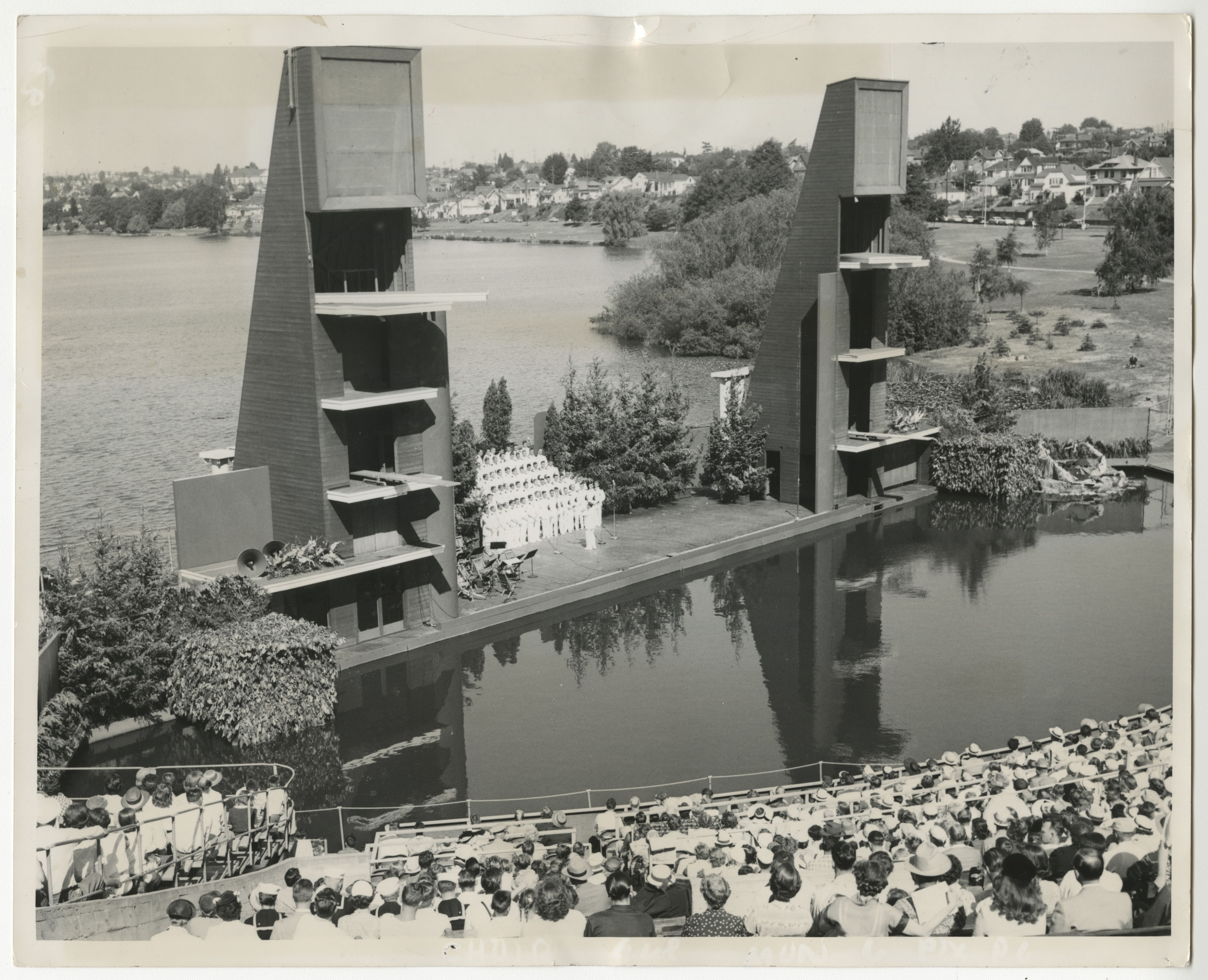
Green Lake Aqua Theater stage and diving platforms, 1954

The remnant of the Green Lake Aqua Theater in October, 2026

The Green Lake Aqua Theater was an outdoor theater located at Green Lake in Seattle, Washington.

The Aqua Theater was built in 1950, for the first Seafair Summer Festival to host the Aqua Follies "swimusicals" - a water ballet, diving, dancing, and comedy show produced by Al Sheehan. The inaugural performance at the venue was on August 11, 1950.

The theater's stage was round, and the orchestra pit nearby was recessed and floating. The theater had high diving platforms near the stage. Its grandstand was fan-shaped and built to a capacity of 5,600 seats. The venue also featured a "moat".

The Aqua Follies continued to run during Seafair until 1965. Outside of the Seafair schedule the theater was the stage for plays and musicals whose directors always took advantage of the unique setting.

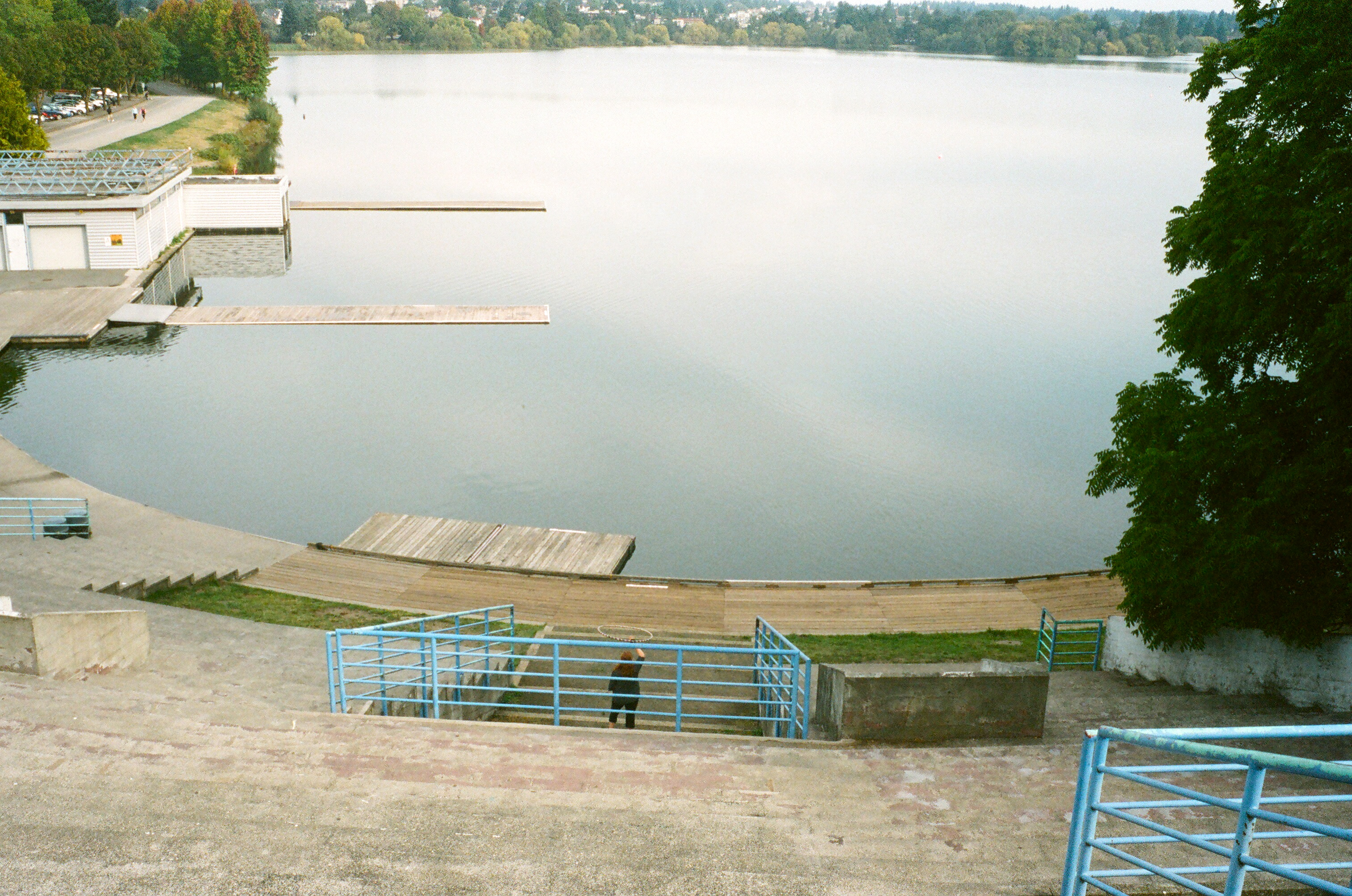
View of water where the stage once floated

In the summer of 1962, coinciding with the Century 21 Exposition, the Aqua Theater stage was host to a jazz festival, popular performers such as Bob Hope, two plays, and a special presentation of the Aqua Follies with 100 performers. On July 4, Gorgeous George wrestled Leo Garibaldi at the Aqua Theatre with the ring surrounded by water.

After the World's Fair, summer productions languished (usually blamed on Seattle's unpredictable weather) the Aqua Theater was mostly abandoned. Led Zeppelin played a concert there in May 1969. During an August 1969 concert by the Grateful Dead the grandstand was found to be unsafe because of poor maintenance.

Beginning in 1970 the theater was dismantled and re-purposed. The area to the right stage offers a pedestrian pier over the lake. To the left of the stage, crew shells are stored. A small craft center was put into the place formerly held by most of the grandstand. Some sections of the grandstand were left in place.
