= Gerberding Hall =

Academic building in Seattle, Washington

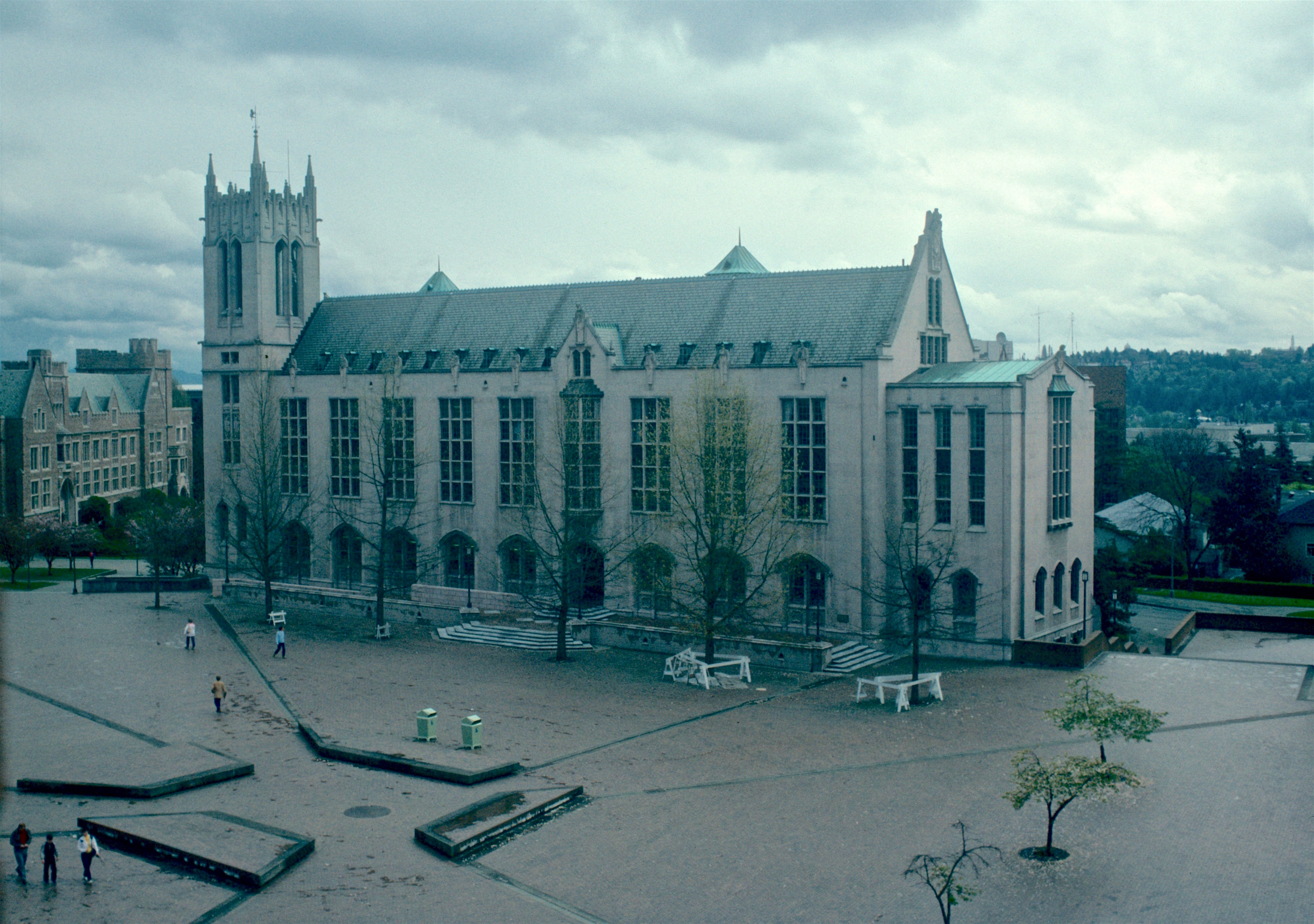
- View from northwest across Red Square in 1984, from Odegaard Undergraduate Library
- Interactive map of the Gerberding Hall area
- Former names: Administration Building (1949–1995)

General information
- Architectural style: Collegiate Gothic
- Location: University of Washington, 1704 NE Grant Lane, Seattle, Washington, United States
- Coordinates: 47°39′19″N 122°18′34″W
- Named for: William Gerberding
- Opened: 1949; 77 years ago
- Owner: University of Washington

Design and construction
- Architects: Victor N. Jones and John T. Jacobsen

Gerberding Hall, formerly the Administration Building, is an academic building located on the campus of the University of Washington in Seattle.

== History ==
Built 77 years ago in 1949 to house the university's administrative offices, it was the first major structure erected on campus following World War II. Constructed from a design by Victor N. Jones and John T. Jacobsen, it was built at a cost of $1,561,924.

Twenty years later in 1969, a bomb was detonated inside the main entrance in the early hours of Sunday, June 29. The explosion created a hole six feet (1.8 m) in diameter in the reinforced concrete and shattered windows in other campus buildings as far as 600 feet (180 m) away. The only occupant at the time of the blast was a custodian in the basement, and he was not injured. It was one of four bombs that were set off that day in Seattle, all without injuries.

The Administration Building was renamed in 1995 in honor of retiring university president William Gerberding. As of 2017, Gerberding Hall houses the office of the university's president.

== Design ==
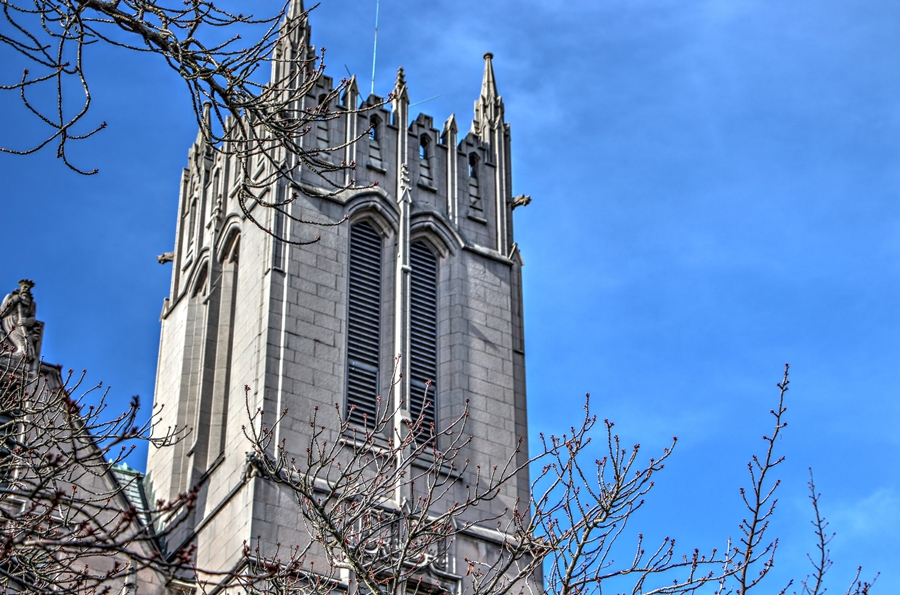
Gerberding Hall's tower

Located on the south edge of Red Square and constructed entirely of cast stone, Gerberding Hall is built in the collegiate Gothic style with its characteristic elements including gargoyles, pointed arches, towers, and gabled roofs. Along its parapets are 25 sculptures by Dudley Pratt representing different academic disciplines; for example, a figure of the god Neptune on the building's east gable is intended to represent oceanography and fisheries science.

The structure is dominated by a central, square tower. On the face of each of its sides is engraved the keys of Phi Beta Kappa. The tower itself, originally intended to serve as a belfry, did not fulfill that purpose until 2008. In that year, a set of eight bells – the Gordon Stuart Peek Foundation Memorial Bells – was installed which were designed to be operated by change ringing. A shield bearing the visage of Herbert Condon in relief and the words "Friend of Youth" sits over the exterior doorway to the tower. (Note: Condon was the university's longtime dean of students.)

Other sculptures on the building's exterior include a Siberian Husky and a man wearing academic gowns holding an adding machine and a money bag.

The interior consists of two, three-story wings set at different ground levels, hinged at the central tower.

== Gallery ==
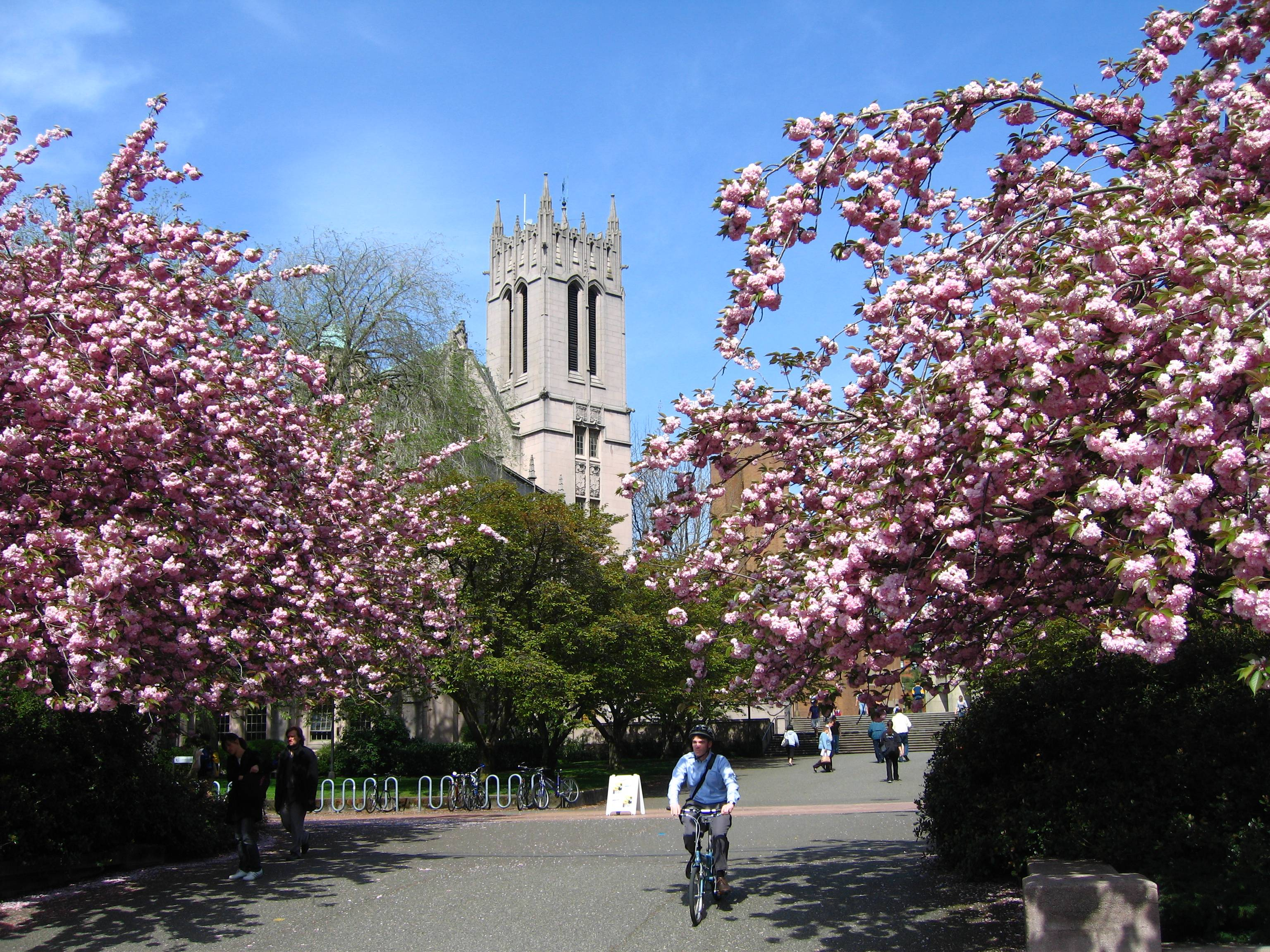
Gerberding Hall from the southeast in 2010

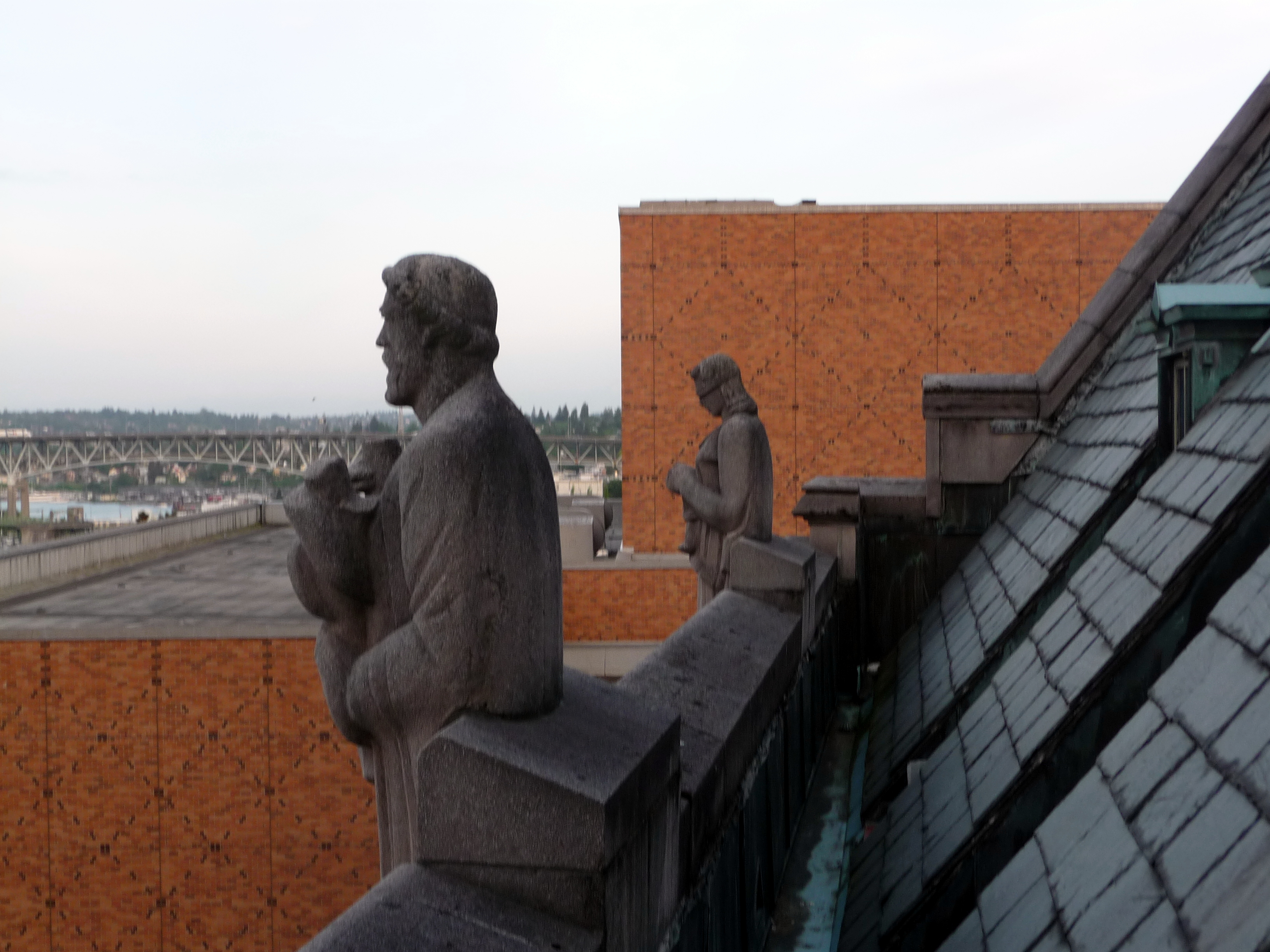
Closeup of rooftop sculptures
