= Yesler Terrace, Seattle =

Mixed-use neighborhood in Seattle, WA

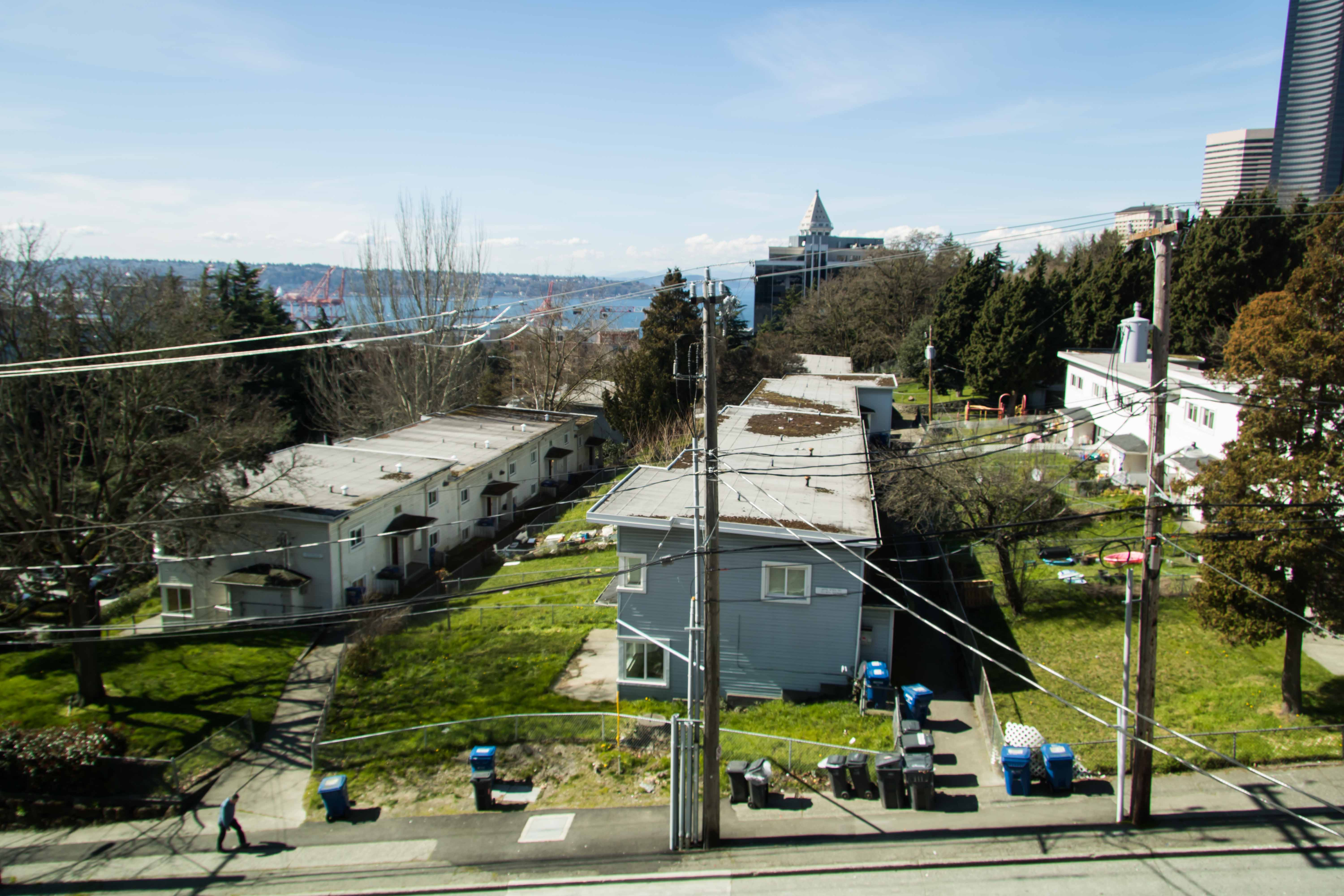
- Rowhouses at Yesler Terrace.

- Location within downtown Seattle
- Coordinates: 47°36′13″N 122°19′15″W

Yesler Terrace is a 22-acre (9 ha) mixed-income, mixed-use neighborhood in Seattle, Washington, United States. It was originally completed in 1941 as the state's first public housing development and the first racially integrated public housing development in the United States. It occupies much of the area formerly known as Yesler Hill, Yesler's Hill, or Profanity Hill. The development is administered by the Seattle Housing Authority, who have been redeveloping the neighborhood into a mixed-income area with multi-story buildings and community amenities since 2013.

== Etymology ==
The name derives ultimately from Henry Yesler, pioneer mill owner. Yesler Way was originally the skid road on which logs were skidded down to the mill. The southern part of the hill came to be known as Yesler's Hill, Yesler Hill, or Profanity Hill. These names referred roughly to the part of First Hill south of the original King County Courthouse at 8th Avenue and Terrace Street. Razed in 1931, the courthouse site was roughly the western portion of the present-day Harborview Medical Center. The name "Profanity Hill" could have its origins from the cursing of the attorneys and litigants at having to climb so steep a grade after missing the cable car, or because of the slum neighborhood known for its uncouth inhabitants to the south where Yesler Terrace is now situated.

== Description ==
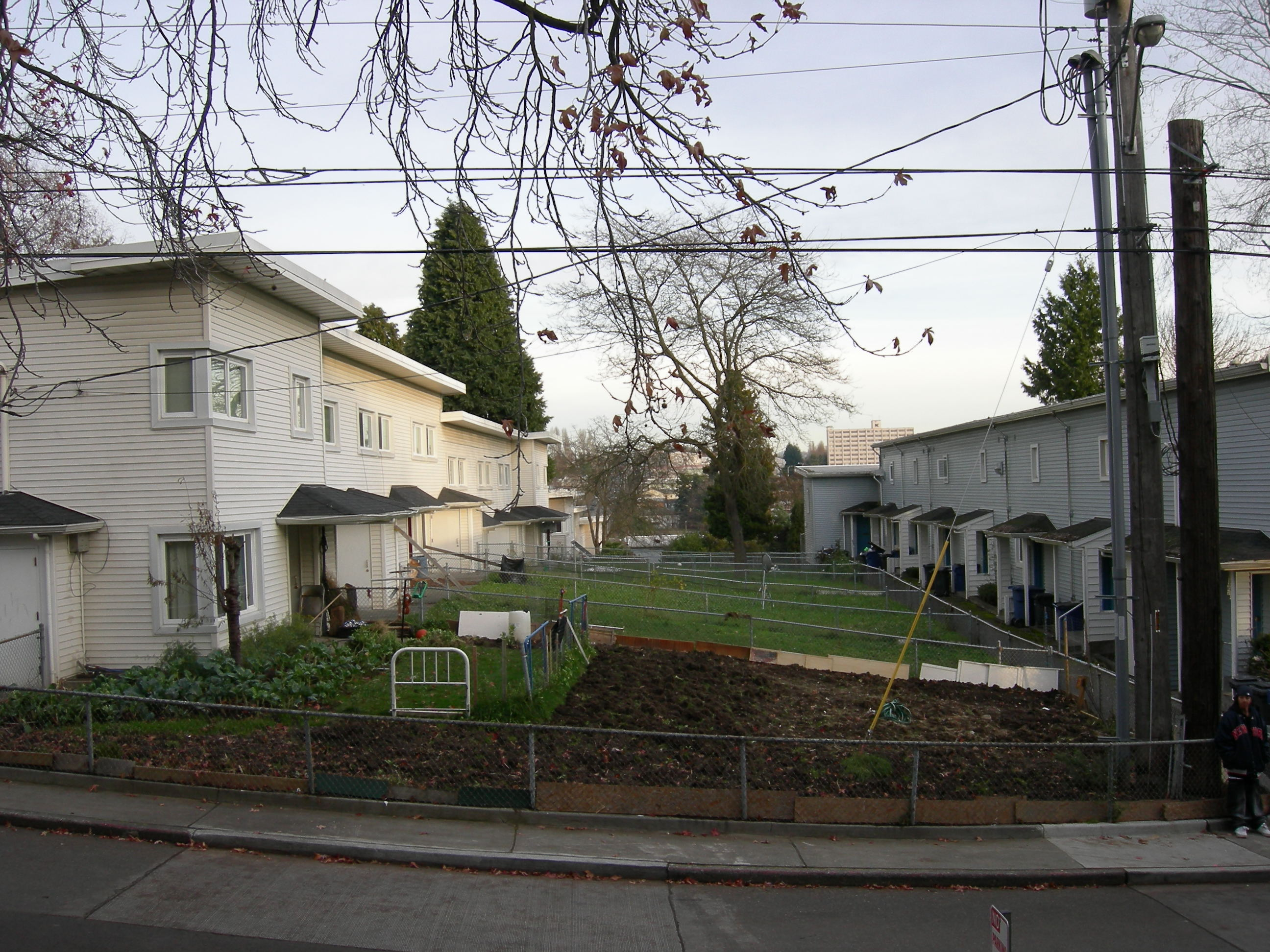
Typical Yesler Terrace houses (2006)

Yesler Terrace is located on the southernmost part of First Hill, along Yesler Way immediately east of downtown Seattle. Uphill across Interstate 5 from Pioneer Square and the International District. Much of the site included Nihonmachi or Japantown until Executive Order 9066 ordered residents to be interned.

Yesler Terrace sits on 28 acres (11 ha) with 561 residential units in 68 buildings, many of which are two-story rowhouses. Unlike most public housing developments, residents have their own private yards. Among parks is Yesler Terrace Park.

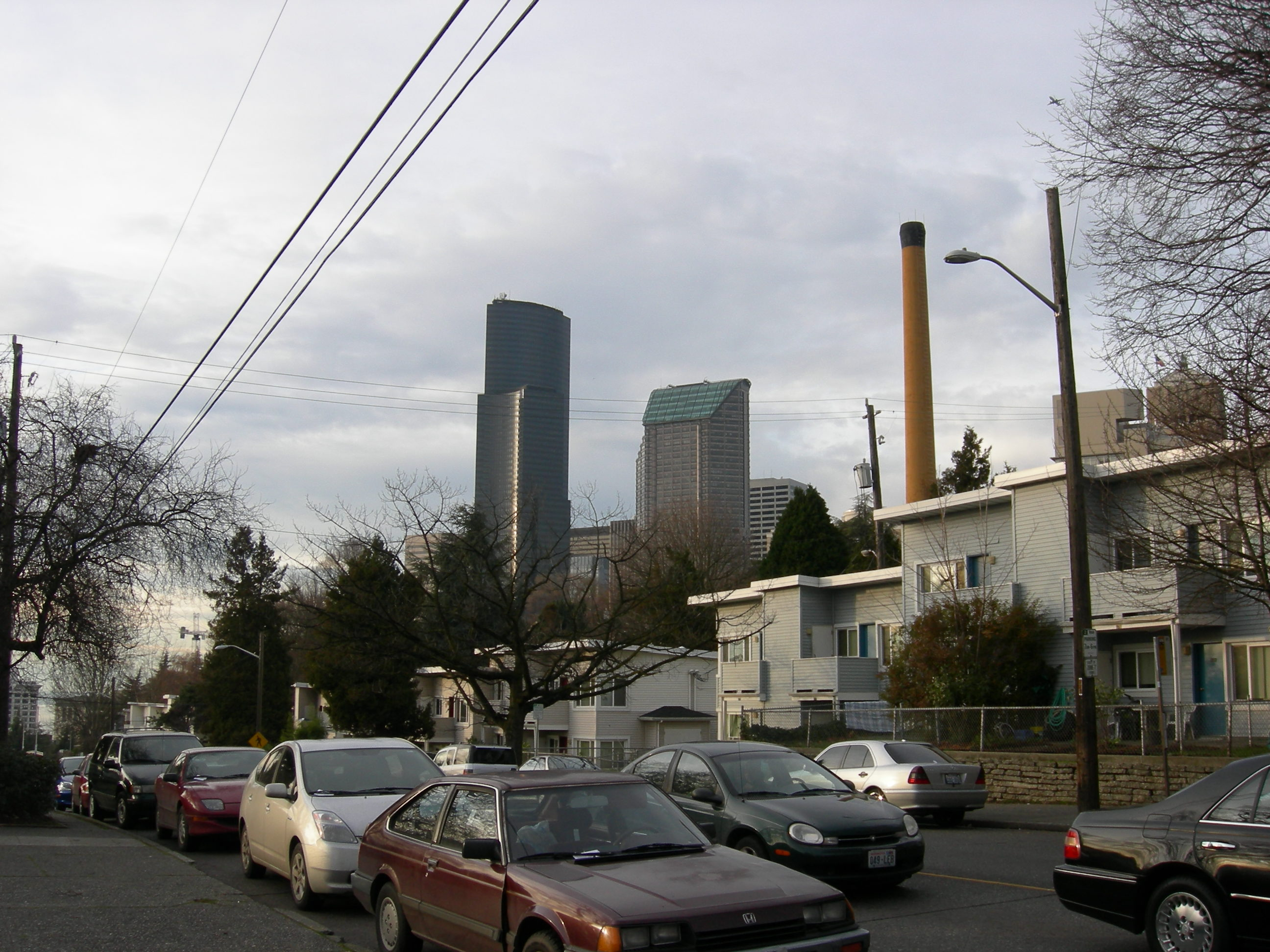
Yesler Way cuts through Yesler Terrace. The Columbia Center and other downtown skyscrapers can be seen in center background, and the upper part of Harborview Medical Center is just visible at right.

The Yesler Hillclimb is a pedestrian thoroughfare connecting the Little Saigon area of Seattle's Chinatown-International District with Yesler Terrace. The hill climb has a ramp, staircase, and mosaics. In mid 2012, Seattle Housing Authority had hoped to start construction in 2013.

== Demographics ==
As of 2005, there were 1,167 residents. An estimated 38% of households are Asian or Asian American, 40% are African or African American, 11% are White, and 3% Native American.

== Redevelopment ==
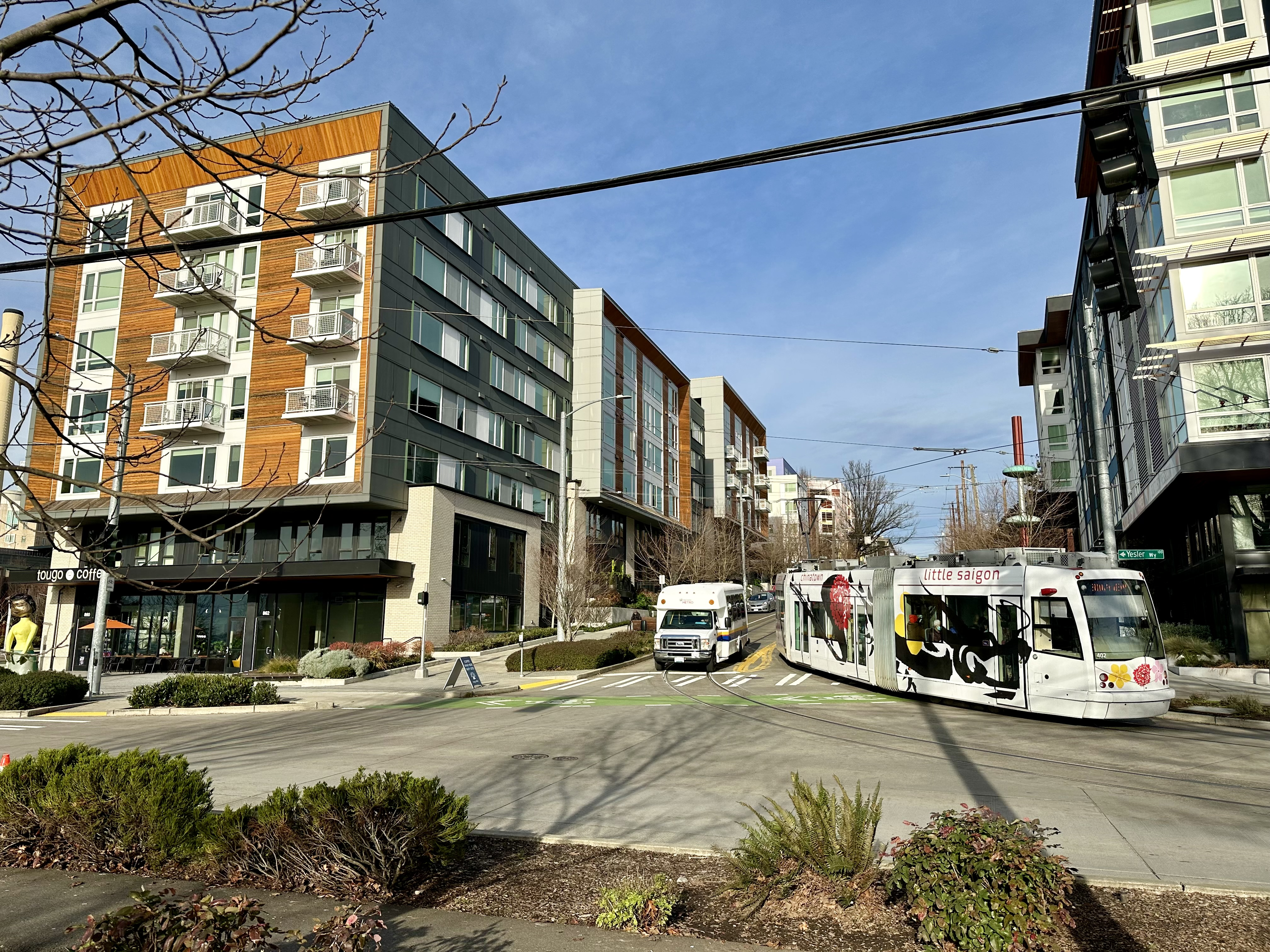
Broadway at Yesler Terrace in 2023

Talks of redeveloping the 60-year-old Yesler Terrace, which had become the oldest public housing project in the city, began in 2004 amid similar schemes to redevelop Rainier Vista, High Point and NewHolly into mixed-income neighborhoods. Formal planning on the project began in 2006 with the hiring of a planning team and recruitment for a citizen review panel.

The $1.7 billion redevelopment project of the neighborhood began in 2013, with plans to replace existing homes with 5,000 mixed-income residential units, 900,000 sq ft (84,000 m^{2}) of office space, and 153,000 sq ft (14,200 m^{2}) of retail and community space. The new development will include at least 561 units for those earning 30% of the area median income (AMI) or less as well as 290 units for 60% of AMI and 850 units for 80% of AMI. The SHA partnered with private developers including Vulcan Real Estate to build market rate and 80% housing in the community. The first new building, Kebero Court, opened in May 2015 and was followed by the opening of Raven Terrace in February 2016. The project, the largest such redevelopment in Seattle's history, is anticipated to take up to 15 years for the full buildout.

The First Hill Streetcar, which began operation in 2016, connects Yesler Terrace to Capitol Hill via Broadway, and the International District via Jackson Street.

Prior to the start of construction, existing Yesler Terrace residents had organized to oppose any redevelopment plans that would reduce the number of units available to residents with the lowest income.

== Education ==
Yesler Terrace is served by three Seattle Public Schools schools: Bailey Gatzert Elementary School, Washington Middle School, and Garfield High School.
