= List of theaters in Minnesota =

This article contains a list of theatres in Minnesota.

== Theatre list ==
- At the Foot of the Mountain Theater
- Blackout Improv
- Brave New Workshop
- Bryant-Lake Bowl
- Chanhassen Dinner Theatres
- Children's Theatre Company
- Commonweal Theatre Company
- Fitzgerald Theater
- Gremlin Theatre
- Guthrie Theater
- Hennepin Center for the Arts
- HUGE Improv Theater
- In the Heart of the Beast Puppet and Mask Theatre
- Illusion Theater
- Joking Apart Theater
- Live Action Set
- Minnesota Dance Theatre
- Minnesota Fringe Festival
- Minnesota Opera
- Mixed Blood Theatre
- Mu Performing Arts
- Old Log Theater
- Ordway Center for the Performing Arts
- Palace Theatre (St. Paul)
- Pantages Theatre
- Pence Opera House in Minneapolis, 1867 - 1952
- Penumbra Theatre Company
- Punchinello Players
- Ragamala Dance Company
- Rarig Center at the University of Minnesota (four theaters)
- Really Spicy Opera
- Red Eye Theater
- Sandbox Theatre
- Skewed Visions
- The Southern Theater
- Starting Gate Productions
- State Theatre (Minneapolis)
- The Historic Orpheum Theatre
- Palace Theater (Luverne, Minnesota)
- The Playwrights' Center
- The Southern Theater
- Theatre de la Jeune Lune
- Theatre in the Round Players (TRP)
- Theatre L'homme Dieu
- Uptown Theater
- Varsity Theater
- Walking Shadow Theatre Company
- Workhouse Theatre Company

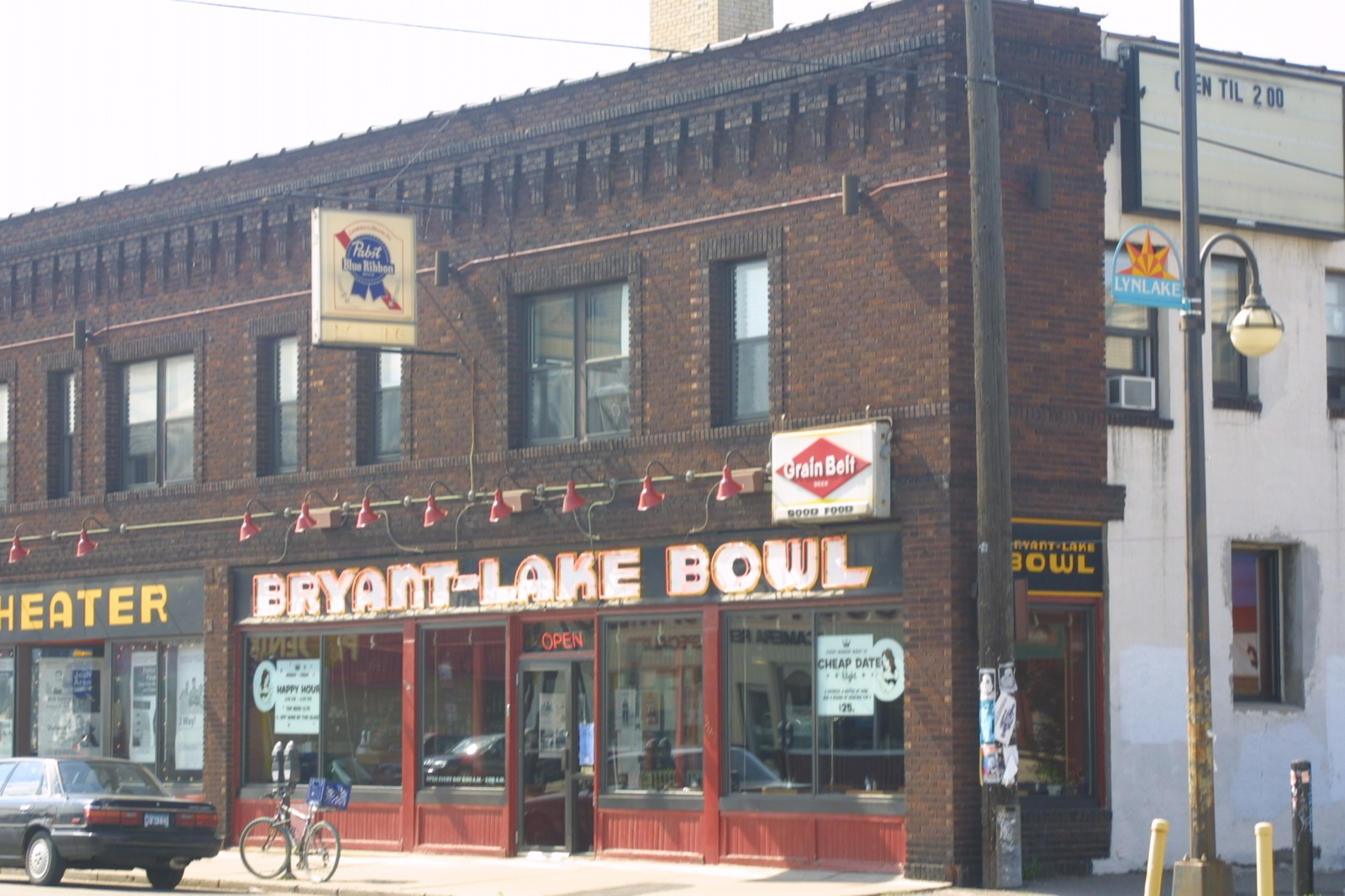
Bryant-Lake Bowl

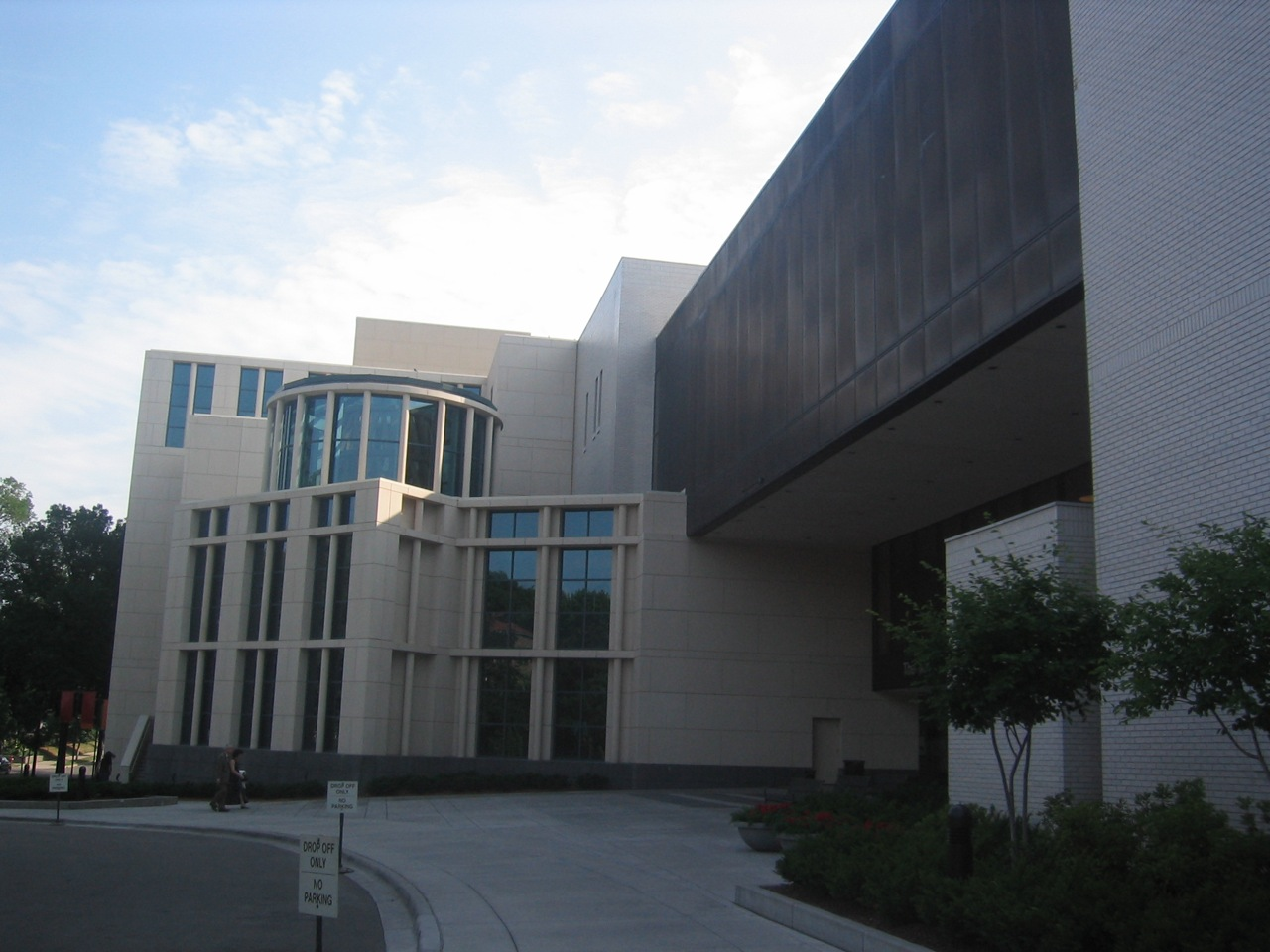
Children's Theatre Company in the Minneapolis Institute of Art

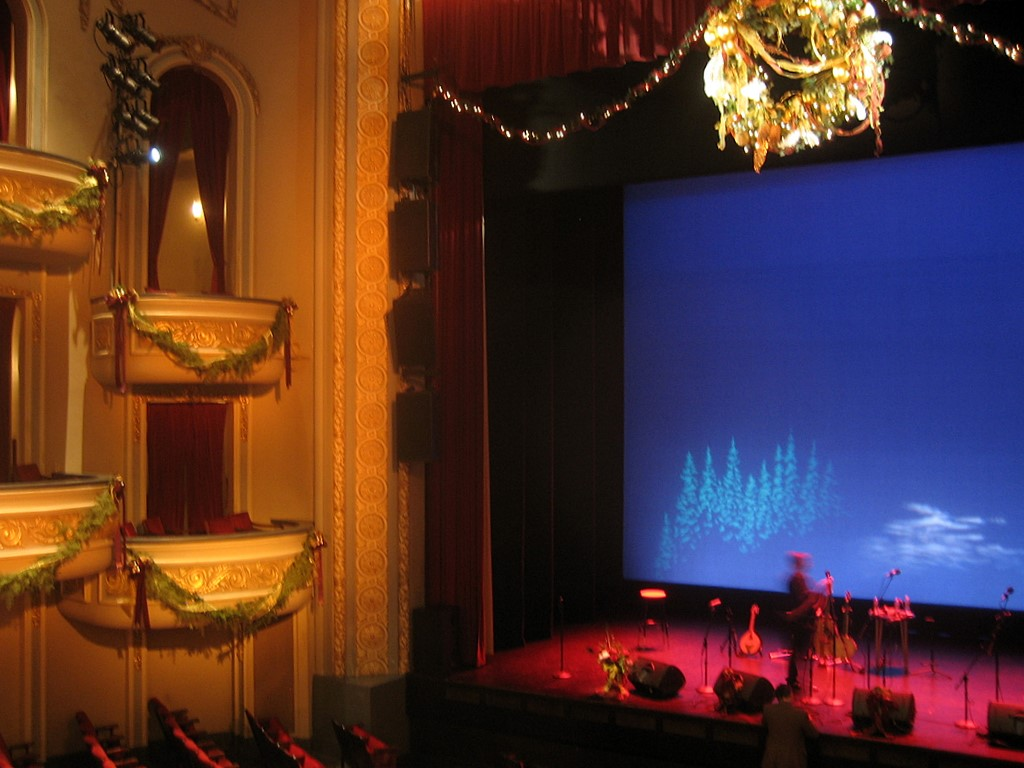
Fitzgerald Theatre, Saint Paul

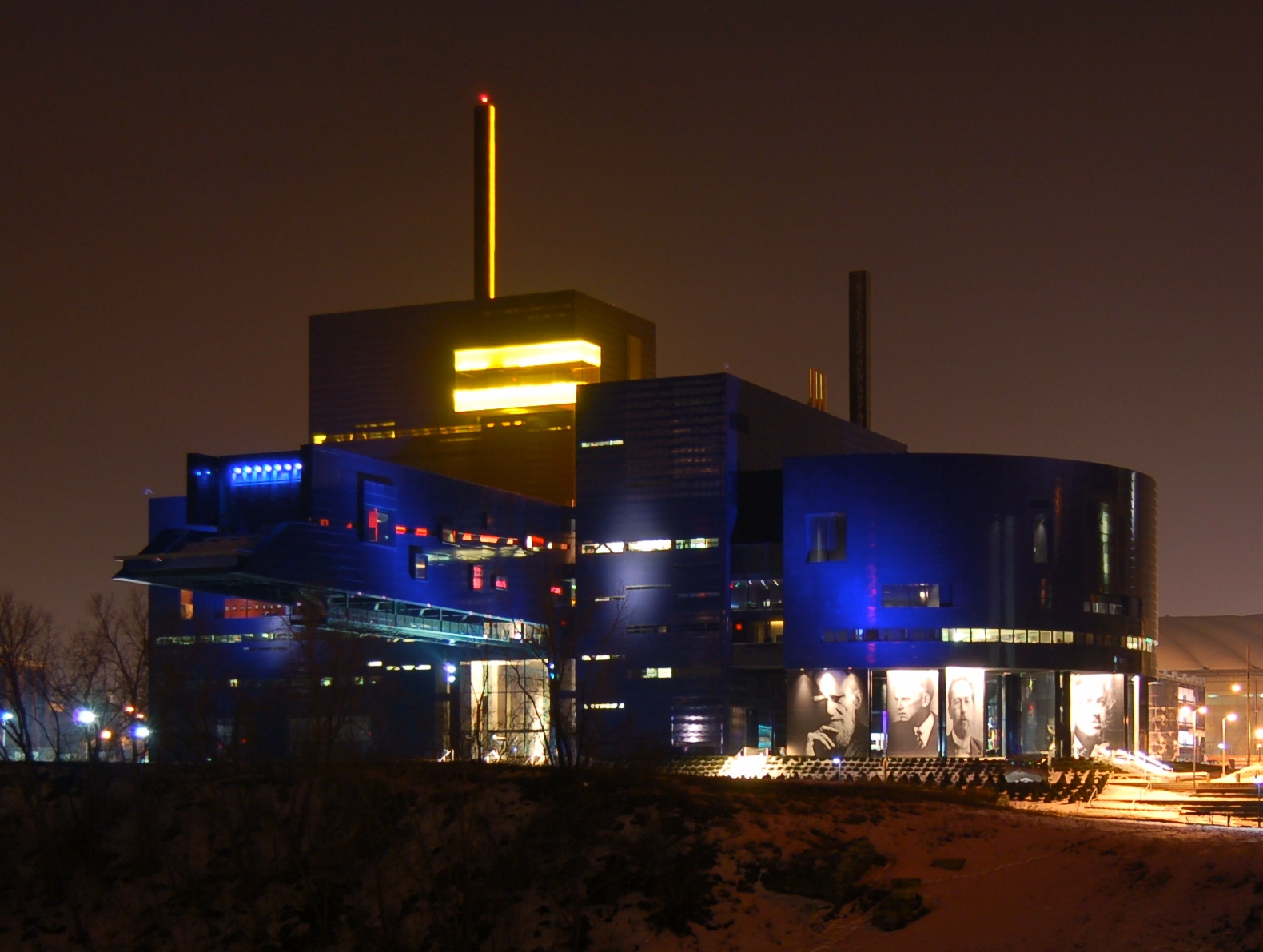
Guthrie Theater, Minneapolis

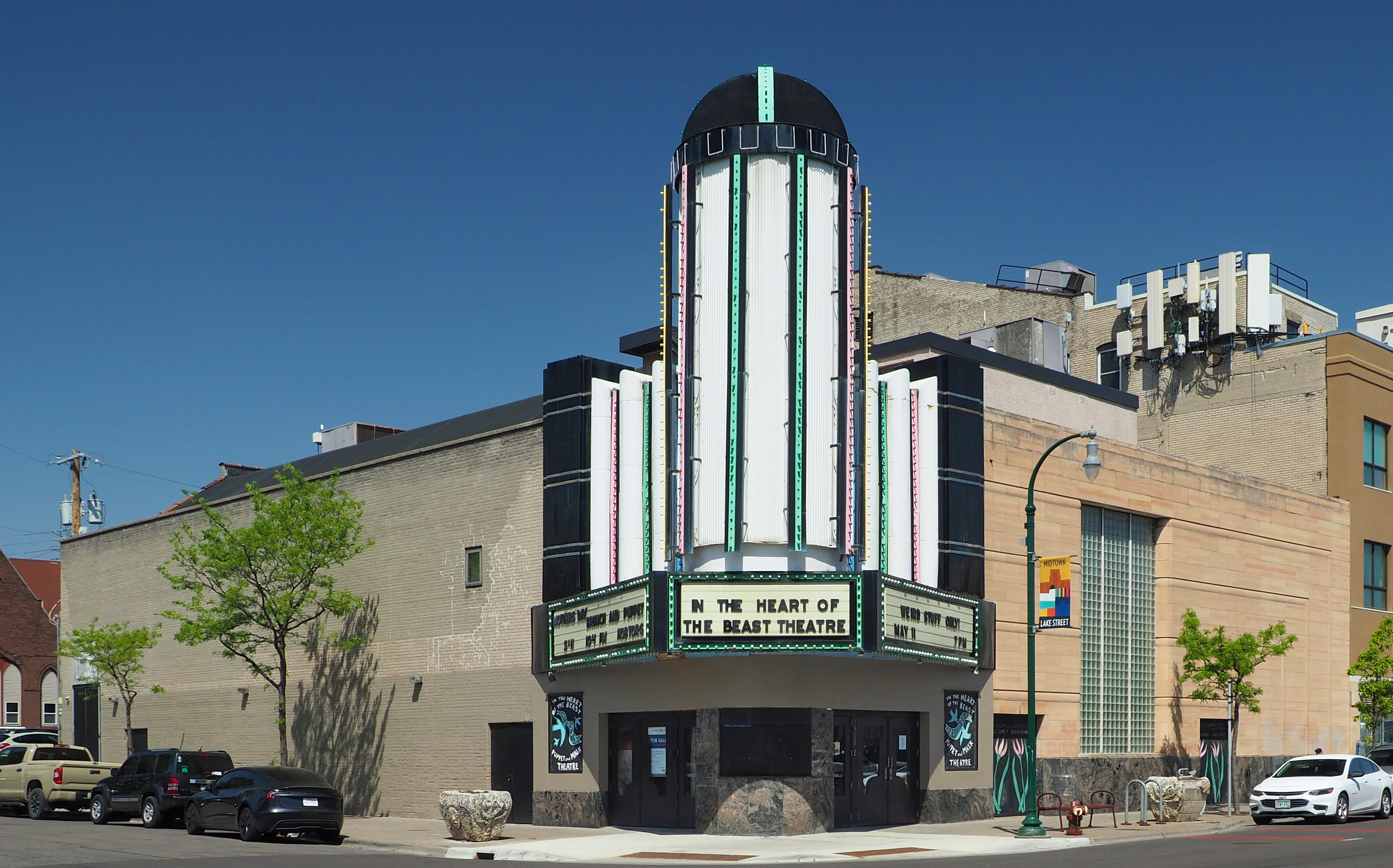
In the Heart of the Beast Puppet and Mask Theatre, Minneapolis

Ordway, Saint Paul

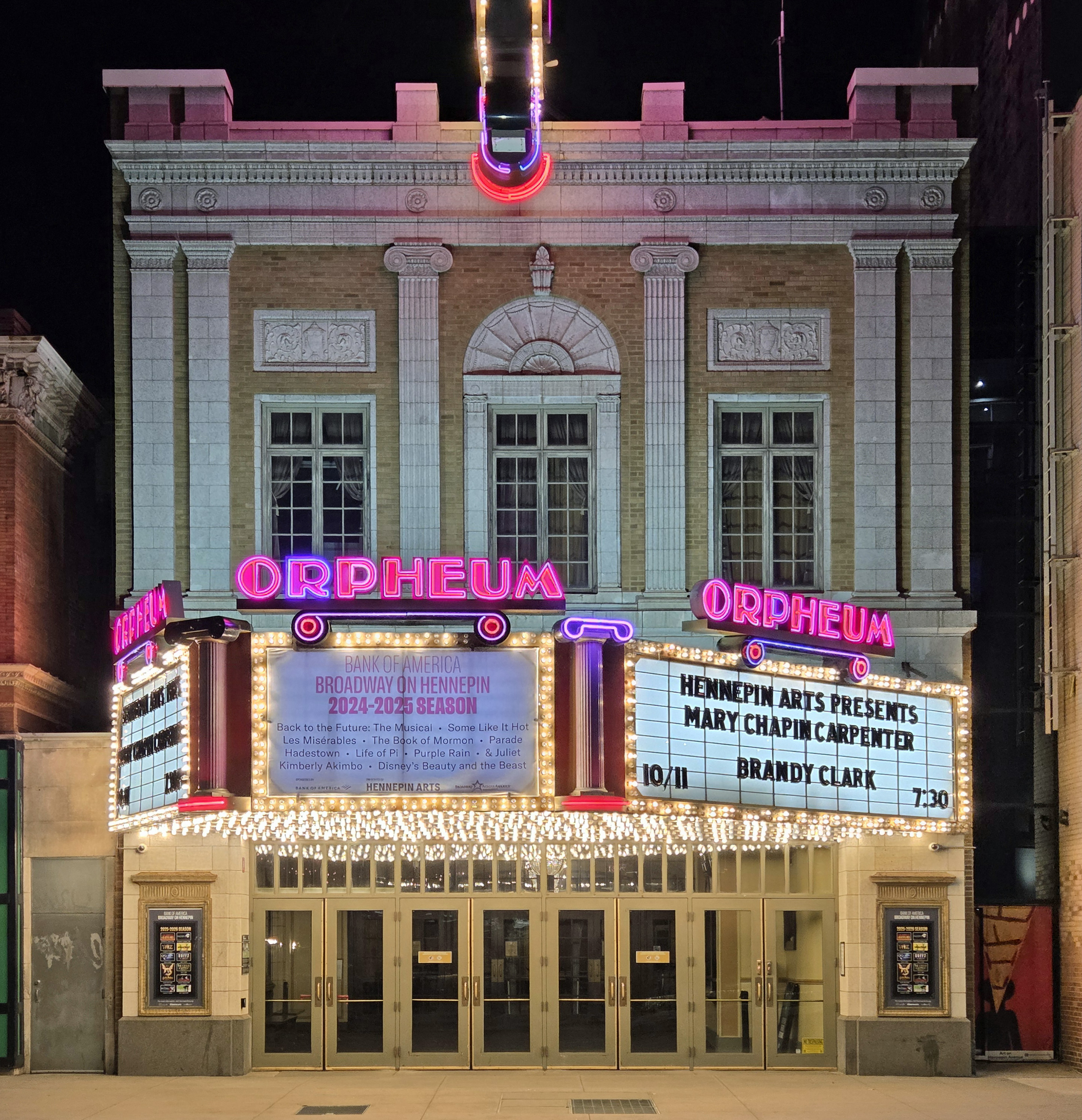
Orpheum, Hennepin Avenue, Minneapolis

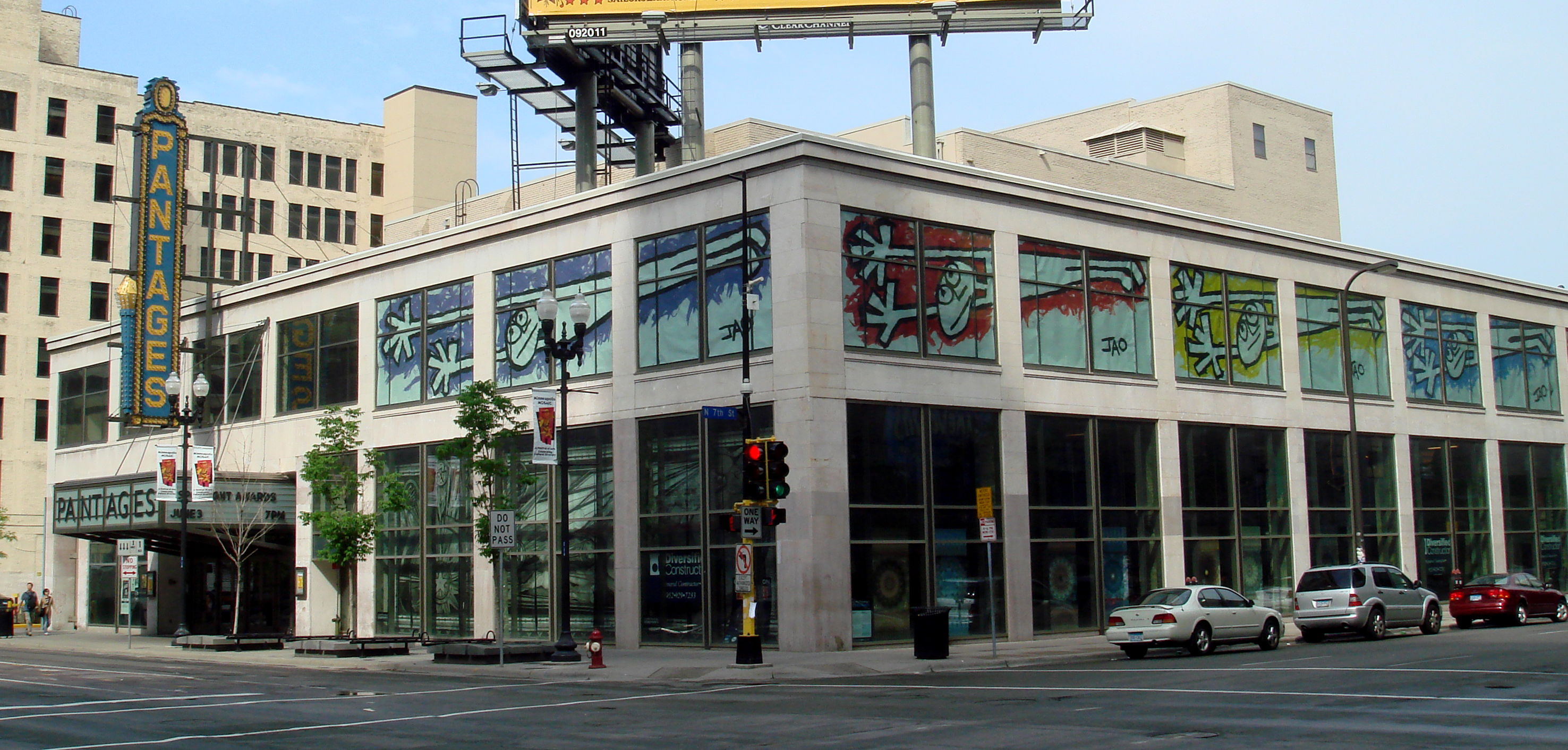
Pantages Theatre, Minneapolis

State Theater, Minneapolis

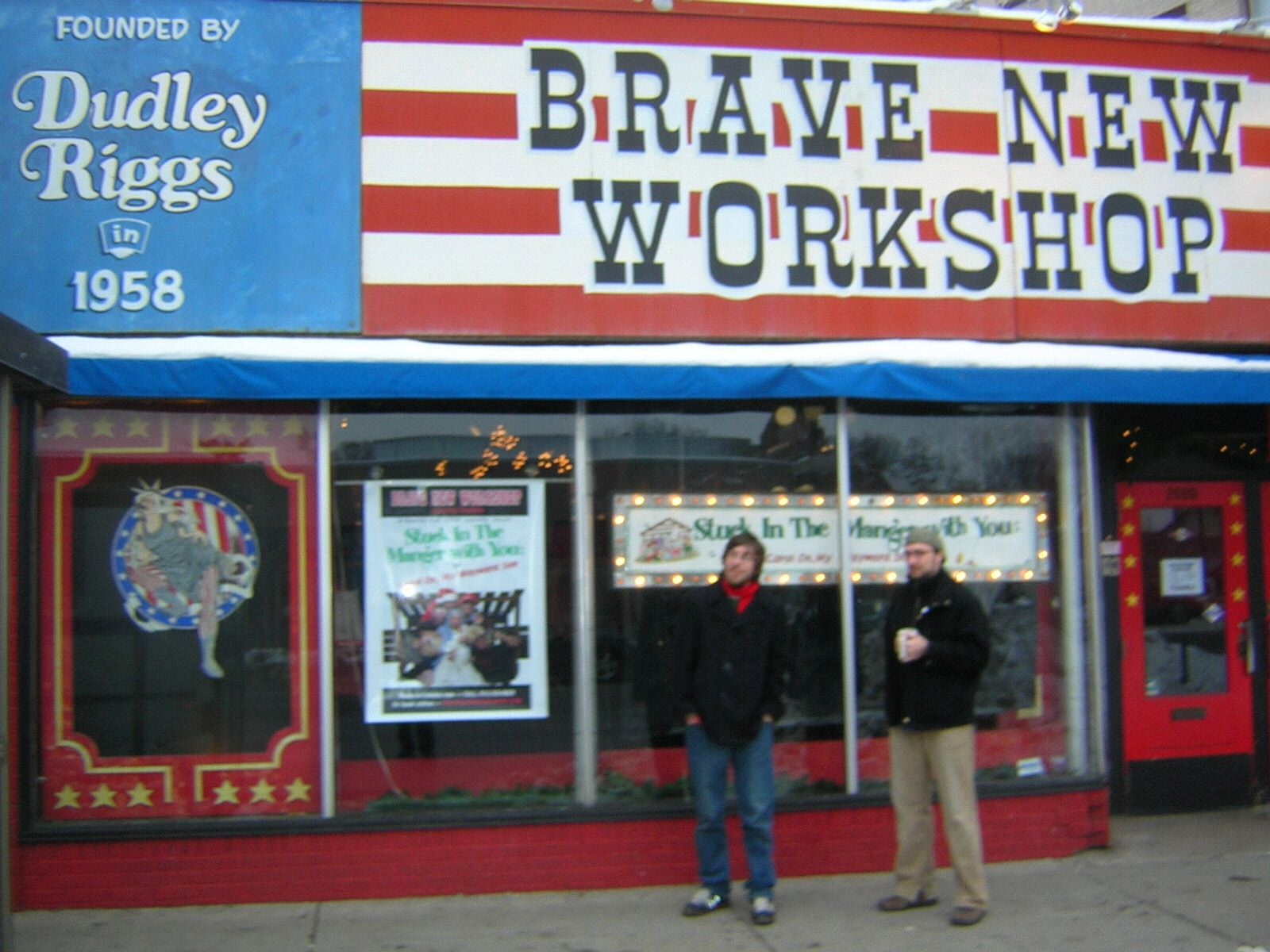
Brave New Workshop, Hennepin Avenue, Minneapolis

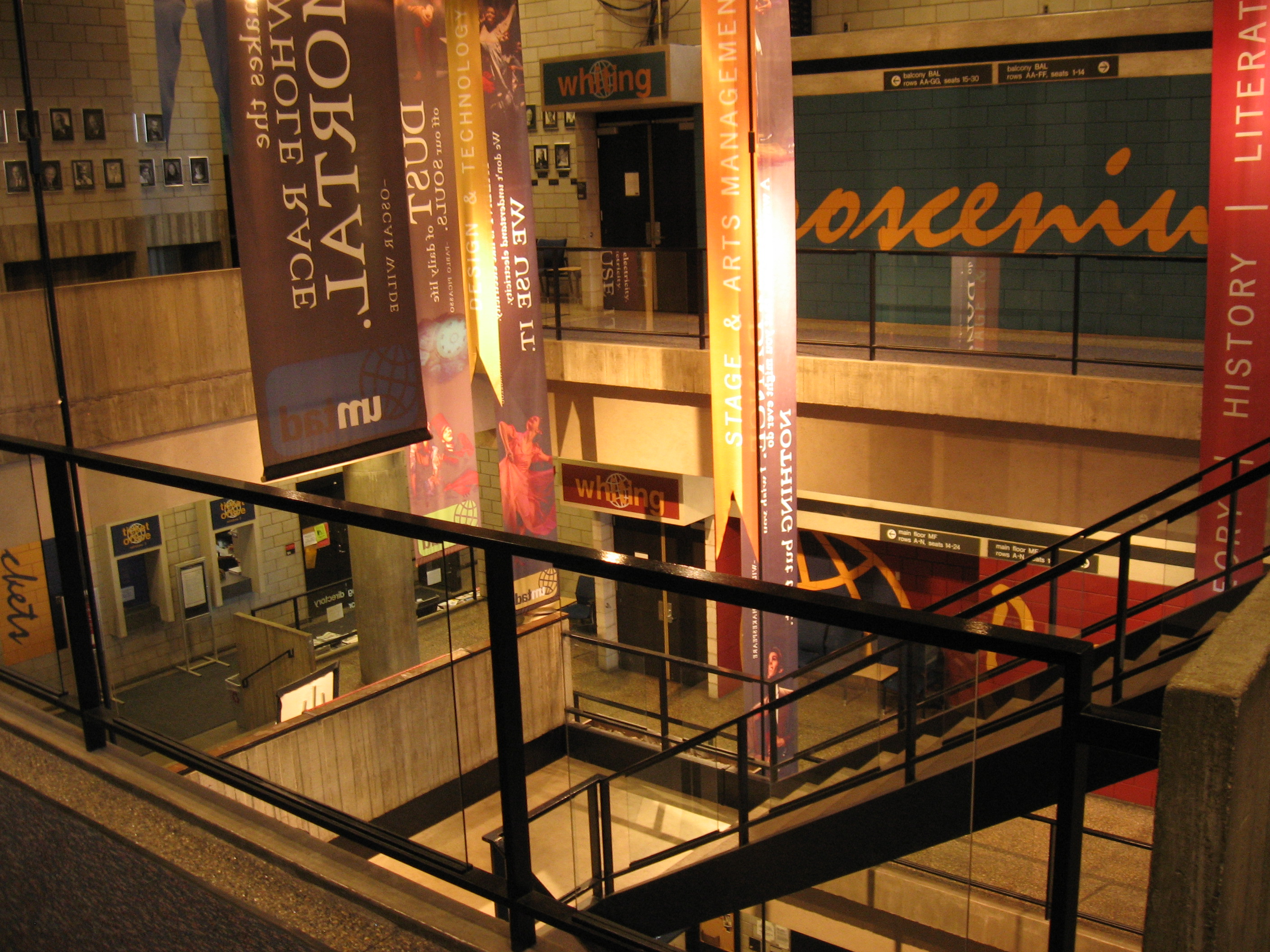
Rarig Center, University of Minnesota, Minneapolis

== Theater awards ==
- Ivey Awards
