= Billy Rose's Aquacade =

Music, dance and swimming show

Billy Rose's Aquacade was a music, dance and swimming show produced by Billy Rose at the Great Lakes Exposition in Cleveland, Ohio during its second year, in 1937. The show featured Olympians Johnny Weissmuller, Eleanor Holm Jarret, Dick Degener, and other performers in a 5,000-seat amphitheater that could seat 2,000 diners. There was a 128 foot wide floating stage constructed on barges that could be moved to shore electrically for use as a dance floor. Dance bands such as Wayne King, Shep Fields, and Glen Gray and his Casa Loma Orchestra performed there.

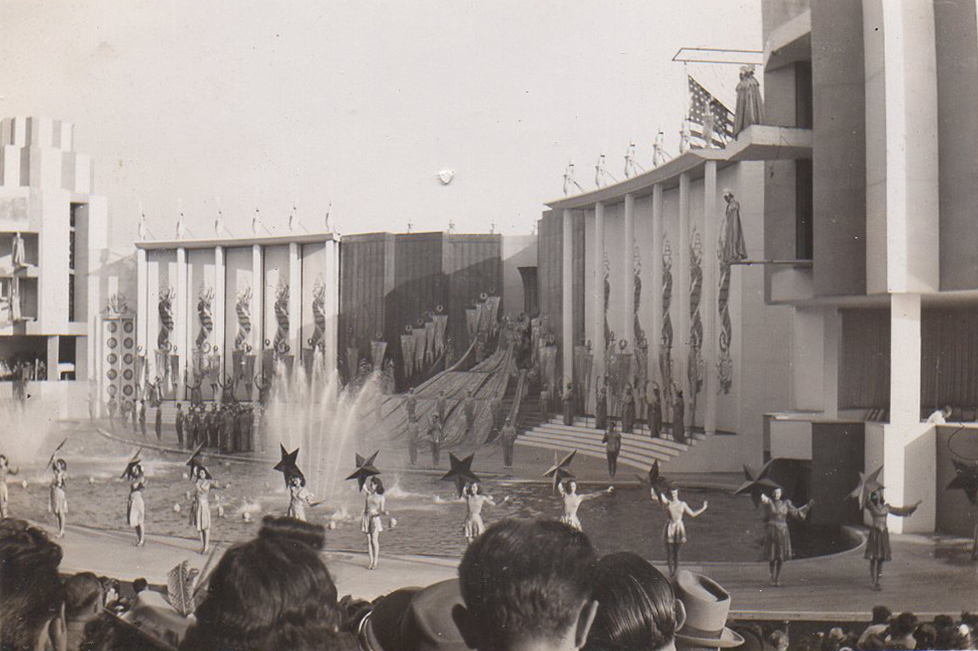
Audience members viewing The Billy Rose Aquacade at the 1939-40 Worlds Fair.

Later Aquacade moved to the 1939 New York World's Fair, where it was the most successful production of the fair (Lowe). The Art Deco 11,000 seat amphitheatre at the north end of Meadow Lake was designed by architects Sloan & Robertson. Shows were staged by John Murray Anderson to the orchestrations of Ted Royal. The pool and the 300 by 200-foot (61 m) stage could be hidden behind a lighted 40-foot (12 m) high curtain of water.

In addition to Weissmuller and Holm, Gertrude Ederle, a Flushing, Queens resident and the first woman to swim the English Channel, appeared in the Aquacade in 1939. Morton Downey, Frances Williams, and Bill Robinson appeared on stage. In late 1939, Rose married Holm after Holm had divorced singer Art Jarrett and he had divorced his first wife, comedian Fanny Brice. Buster Crabbe replaced Weissmuller in 1940, for the second year of the Fair.

In 1940, Aquacade also opened in San Francisco at the Golden Gate International Exposition where Esther Williams and Virginia Hopkins joined the show. The Aquacade inspired Al Sheehan's production of the Aqua Follies at the Minneapolis Aquatennial.

== See also ==
- 1939 New York World's Fair pavilions and attractions

== Sources ==
- Cohen, Mark (2018). Not Bad for Delancey Street: The Rise of Billy Rose, America's Great Jewish Impresario. Waltham, MA: Brandeis University Press.
- Art Deco New York; D. Lowe; 2004; Watson-Guptill
- "So Long at the Fair"; The New York Times; Jun 11, 1995
- "Love in the Ruins; Preservationists Fight to Save Crumbling Queens Aquacade"; L. Holloway. The New York Times; Jun 6, 1995
- 1939: The Lost World of the Fair; David Gelernter; Free Press, 1995
- aqua-; Oxford English Dictionary Online, 2d Ed.
- "THE ROSE ON THE WATER; Being a Brief Description of What Cleveland Will See in Aquacade"; The New York Times; February 28, 1937
- "A Woman's New York: 4,000 Applicants Turn Up..." Alice Hughes; The Washington Post; Feb 28, 1939;
- "The Water Show"; Wall Street Journal; May 6, 1939
- "Eleanor Holm Jarrett Breaks With Band Leader-Husband"; The Washington Post; July 21, 1937
- Hard Times, High Visions: Golden Gate International Exposition; Bancroft Library, University of California, Berkeley
- Official Souvenir Guide; Great Lakes Exposition, 1937
- "Expo Has Rivals for Water Show"; The Cleveland Plain Dealer; April 18, 1937, p. 2
- "Billy Rose, Eleanor Hope for Marriage"; The Cleveland Plain Dealer; November 13, 1937, p. 14
- "Eleanor and Billy Take the Plunge"; The Cleveland Plain Dealer; November 15, 1939, p. 7
- Official Souvenir Guide; Golden Gate International Exhibition, 1940
- Wolfert, Ira. "Carnival Men at Fair Must Be High-Pressure Salesmen"; The Cleveland Plain Dealer; August 6, 1939. p. 37
