= Off-Leash Area =

Off-Leash Area is a contemporary performance company based in Minneapolis, Minnesota. The company focuses on creating original performance pieces that draw on many disciplines in theatre, dance, music, and visual art. Founded by Jennifer Ilse and Paul Herwig in 1999, Off-Leash Area has gone on to win critical praise and multiple awards for its highly-stylized physical performances and set designs. Herwig and Ilse converted their garage into a mini-theater where they perform rough versions of their plays for small reservation-only audiences.

== Awards ==
- 2000 Top Ten Shows of the Year for Z.A.P.! Künst
- 2002 Top Ten Shows of the Year for The Sunrise Café
- Ten Best Sets of 2005: Paul Herwig for A Cupboard Full of Hate
- 2005 City Pages Artists of the Year
- 2005 Ivey Award for Outstanding Production for PSST!
- 2006 Ivey Award for Choreography: Gerry Girouard for Crimes and Whispers
- 2006 Ten Great Sets/Scenic Design: Paul Herwig for Crimes and Whispers
- 2007 Ten Shows with Standout Sets/Designs: Paul Herwig for A Gift For Planet BX63

== Shows ==
- 1999: The Bellman's Song
- 2000: The Gryphon
- 2001: Z.A.P.! Künst; Archy & Mehitabel
- 2002: The Sunrise Café
- 2003: Z.A.P.! Künst; The Sunrise Café
- 2004: Predator/Prey; Philip Guston Standing on His Head Standing Philip Guston on His Head
- 2005: PSST!; Maggie's Brain; A Cupboard Full of Hate
- 2006: Philip Guston Standing on His Head Standing Philip Guston on His Head; A Cupboard Full of Hate; Crimes and Whispers
- 2007: Border Crossing
- 2008: Ivan the Drunk and His Terrible Tale of Woe; Our Town
- 2009: The Jury
- 2010: Expedition of Coat (and me); A Gift for Planet BX63; Le Squat
- 2011: A Gift for Planet BX63; Le Squat; Now Eye See You Now Eye Don't
- 2012: The Picnic; Rip, Romp & Howl
- 2013: The Picnic; Psst!
- 2014: Stripe & Spot (learn to) Get Along; Maggie's Brain
- 2015: Stripe & Spot (learn to) Get Along; S.A.M.O (Like a Fiery Comet Jean Michel Basquiat Shoots Across the Sky)
- 2016: Stripe & Spot (learn to) Get Along; AfterWind
- 2017: Dancing on the Belly of the Beast
- 2018: Paws 'n' Effect
- 2019: Paws 'n' Effect; The Time Is
- 2021: i want to change the subject, again; Mulier Dierum: Chronicles of Woman
- 2022: Minotaur
- 2023: The Medicine Show of the 25th Century
- 2024: The Knave of Knives - The Duchess of Dawn; The Medicine Show of the 25th Century
