= Al Sheehan =

American entertainment businessman (1899–1967)

- Born: October 8, 1899; Caledonia, Minnesota, US
- Died: January 17, 1967 (aged 67); St. Louis Park, Minnesota, US
- Education: Winona Teachers College; University of Minnesota
- Occupations: Talent agent, producer, director, radio host
- Known for: WCCO; Aqua Follies; Minnesota State Fair

Alvin Barrett Sheehan (October 8, 1899 – January 17, 1967) was an American entertainment businessman and radio host known as a producer of stage shows, night club acts, and water ballets. Announcing for WCCO radio in Minneapolis, he became the station's assistant general manager, director of production, program director, and established the WCCO Artist's Bureau to manage talent. At the same time, he was superintendent of attractions at the Minnesota State Fair, staged shows at Excelsior Amusement Park, and was master of ceremonies at the Minnesota and State Theaters.

Leaving the radio business when taking control of the artist's bureau in 1945, Sheehan privatized the agency as Al Sheehan Incorporated and produced shows across the United States. By 1949, Billboard magazine described him as "Mr. Show Business of Minnesota". He produced and directed the Aqua Follies as part of the Minneapolis Aquatennial, by signing former Olympians and competitive swimmers for the show which later expanded to Seafair festival in Seattle. His agency booked more than 1,000 shows per year by the 1960s, including Minneapolis night club acts the Edgewater Eight and the Golden Strings, and the annual Medora Musical spectacular in North Dakota.

== Early life and education ==
Alvin Barrett Sheehan was born on October 8, 1899, in Caledonia, Minnesota, the son of Timothy and Mary Sheehan. (Note: Alvin Barrett Sheehan was born on October 8, 1899, in Caledonia, Minnesota, the son of Mary Sheehan. Alvin Barrett Sheehan was born in Caledonia, Minnesota, the son of Timothy Sheehan.) His father was a school teacher turned merchant, and his mother's family homesteaded in Houston County. Sheehan had two brothers and three sisters, and moved to Winona at an early age. He was a paperboy and copy boy for the Winona Republican Herald, then was captain of his high school football, track and field, and basketball teams, prior to a knee injury. Graduating from Winona Senior High School, he also participated in drama classes and the school play. After high school, he was a playgrounds supervisor and assistant secretary at the Winona YMCA, and worked on a pavement crew and as a surveying assistant.

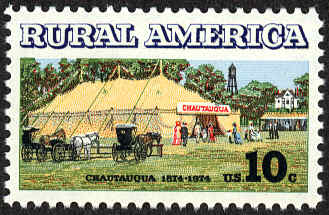
Rural Chautauqua tent example

Studying at Winona Normal School, Sheehan was involved with the school's stage productions, theater at the Winona Opera House, and appeared occasionally as an extra. He worked summers for the Chautauqua circuit, gaining insight to production while setting up the tent, staging, and lighting; and ticket taking. After one year at Winona Normal School, he transferred to University of Minnesota as a member of the Student Army Training Corps and considered becoming a lawyer. After World War I, he completed a teaching license at Winona Normal School but never taught.

== Business and radio career ==
Sheehan's family and his teachers cautioned against pursuing a career solely in show business. After college he pursued journalism and worked for a stock company in Winona. As a reporter for the Winona Republican Herald, he reviewed the local Little Theatre Movement shows and occasionally performed in their productions.

By 1921, Sheehan relocated to the Minneapolis–Saint Paul area. He worked in the traffic division of the Soo Line Railroad for one year, followed by three years as assistant traffic manager at the Minneapolis Steel & Machinery Company. While in Minneapolis–Saint Paul, he joined an amateur theatrical troupe which worked at 60 local theaters. Reciting poetry in local talent shows, his repertoire included "Gunga Din", "Boots", and "Casey at the Bat". He also made bookings for other amateur performers at local theaters. Becoming manager of the troupe in 1922, he oversaw the business and logistics aspects of theater, which prepared him for becoming a producer and agent.

Returning to Winona in 1925, he rejoined the Little Theater Group. Buying into a soda pop distribution business for $1, he traveled to state fairs and circuses selling to concessions, and using his connections as a carnival barker to his advantage. Four years later, he sold his share of the business for $5,000. He then worked in Chicago at an oil brokerage firm, and selling securities and stocks in Wisconsin for two years.

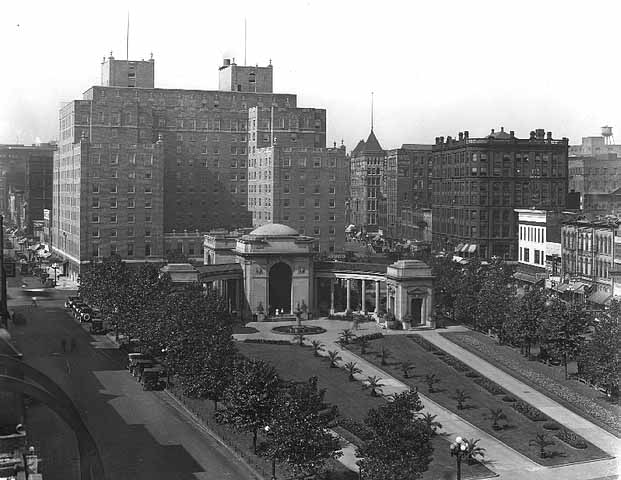
Sheehan worked for WCCO, headquartered at the Nicollet Hotel during the 1930s.

Sheehan returned to the oil business in Minneapolis in 1928, then sold stocks and bonds, and joined the MacPhail School of Music and Dramatic Art. Impressed by Sheehan's voice, John Seaman Garnes of the MacPhail school recommended applying as a part-time announcer at WCCO operated by Columbia Broadcasting System. Keeping his daytime job, Sheehan announced from 6:00 pm until midnight on the radio, including studio programs, features, musicals, dramas, and special events.

After resigning from radio to sell stocks and bonds in 1929, Sheehan was persuaded by WCCO manager Henry Bellows to broadcast three five-minute radio shows per week. After the Wall Street crash of 1929, Sheehan returned full-time to radio. He became announcer and master of ceremonies at the Minnesota and State Theaters in 1930, and presented stage shows at Excelsior Amusement Park.

As an emcee for series of Nordic folk music performances by the Oscar Danielson orchestra broadcast live from the Nicollet Hotel, Sheehan used his alter ego "Al Sheehanson" to announce the show's opening phonetically in the Swedish language. He later received fan mail in Swedish which he was unable to read. At the same time, he appeared in a live comedy act as a straight man with an Irish accent, and hired substitutes for his radio show while he toured.

Sheehan began announcing the annual Minnesota State Fair grandstand show in 1929. He became the fair's superintendent of attractions in 1938, and was a liaison between the performers and the fair's board of governors. He also oversaw events at the fair's track racing oval.

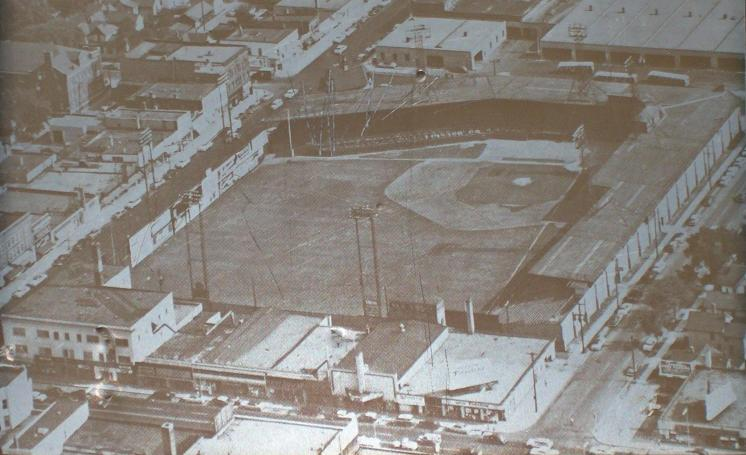
Sheehan announced games for the Minneapolis Millers at Nicollet Park

Becoming a full-time announcer by 1932, Sheehan did interviews and previews for theaters and concerts, and voiced roles in radio mysteries. He also broadcast baseball play-by-play for the Minneapolis Millers in the summer, and Minnesota Golden Gophers football in the fall. He announced the Millers' home games live from Nicollet Park, and recreated road games via ticker tape. He became WCCO's expert on contract bridge despite not knowing "one card from another", nor "a trump from a rubber".

Sheehan became the assistant general manager of WCCO in 1935. By 1943, he was the assistant general manager, director of production, and program director at WCCO. In 1945, he resigned from radio business to pursue a talent agency career.

== Talent agent and producer ==
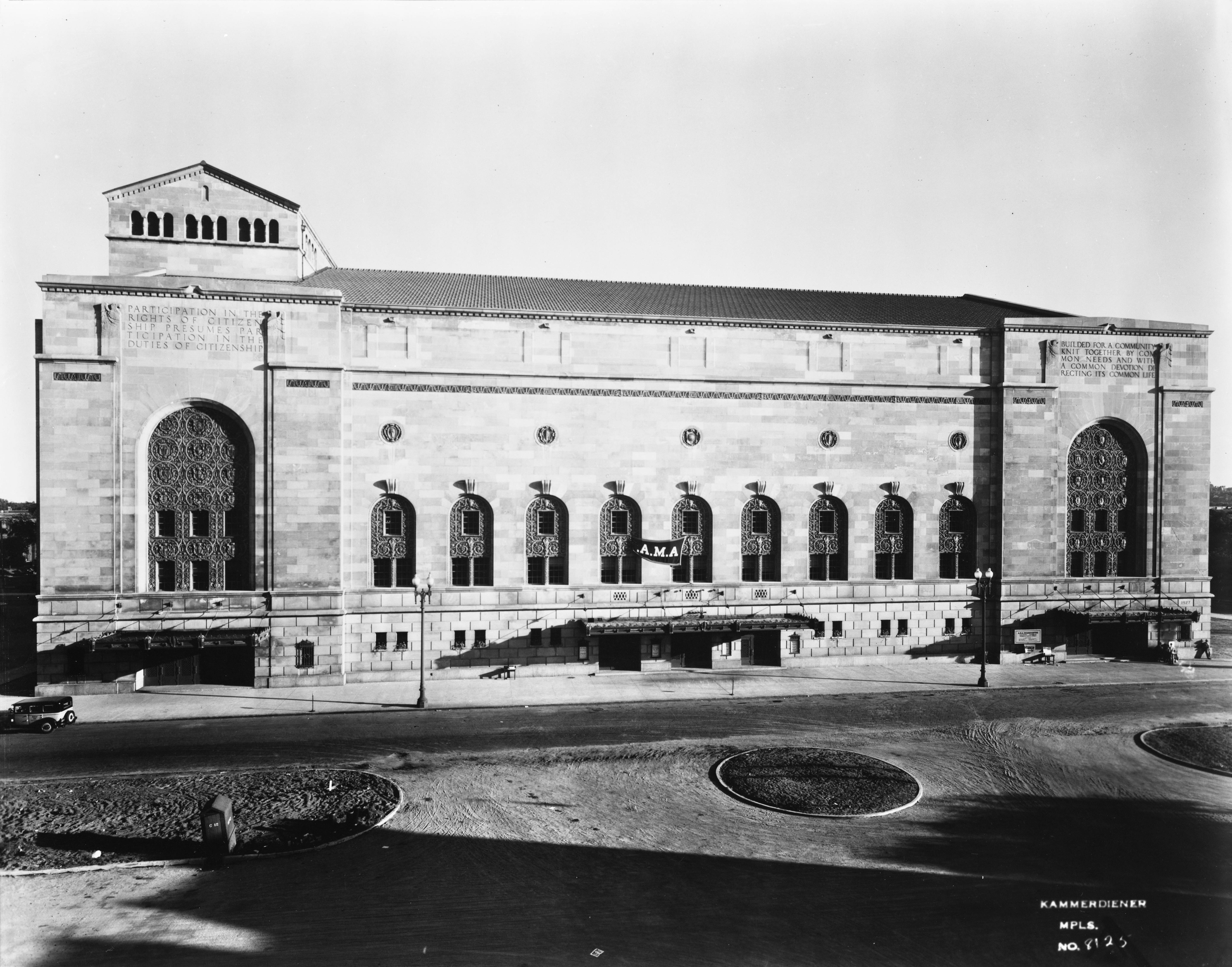
Sheehan booked artists to perform at the Minneapolis Auditorium.

Establishing the WCCO Artist's Bureau in 1932, Sheehan managed the radio station talent. In 1935, the bureau became a separate corporation with Sheehan as the local manager. When the Federal Communications Commission ordered radio stations to divest themselves of talent subsidiaries, the bureau came under the control of Vaudeville performer John Williams. In 1945, Sheehan purchased the bureau which became Al Sheehan Incorporated, and employed Williams.

Sheehan's agency booked shows across the United States, claiming that "We can take on any kind of show". In 1949, Billboard magazine described him as "Mr. Show Business of Minnesota". As bureau president and treasurer, Sheehan booked concerts at the Minneapolis Auditorium for singers Hazel Scott, Jascha Heifetz, and Risë Stevens. By 1951, his agency had more than 600 artists at its disposal. During six years of the 1950s, he produced a traveling act for Hormel Foods where women in white cars sold meat products.

=== The Aqua Follies ===
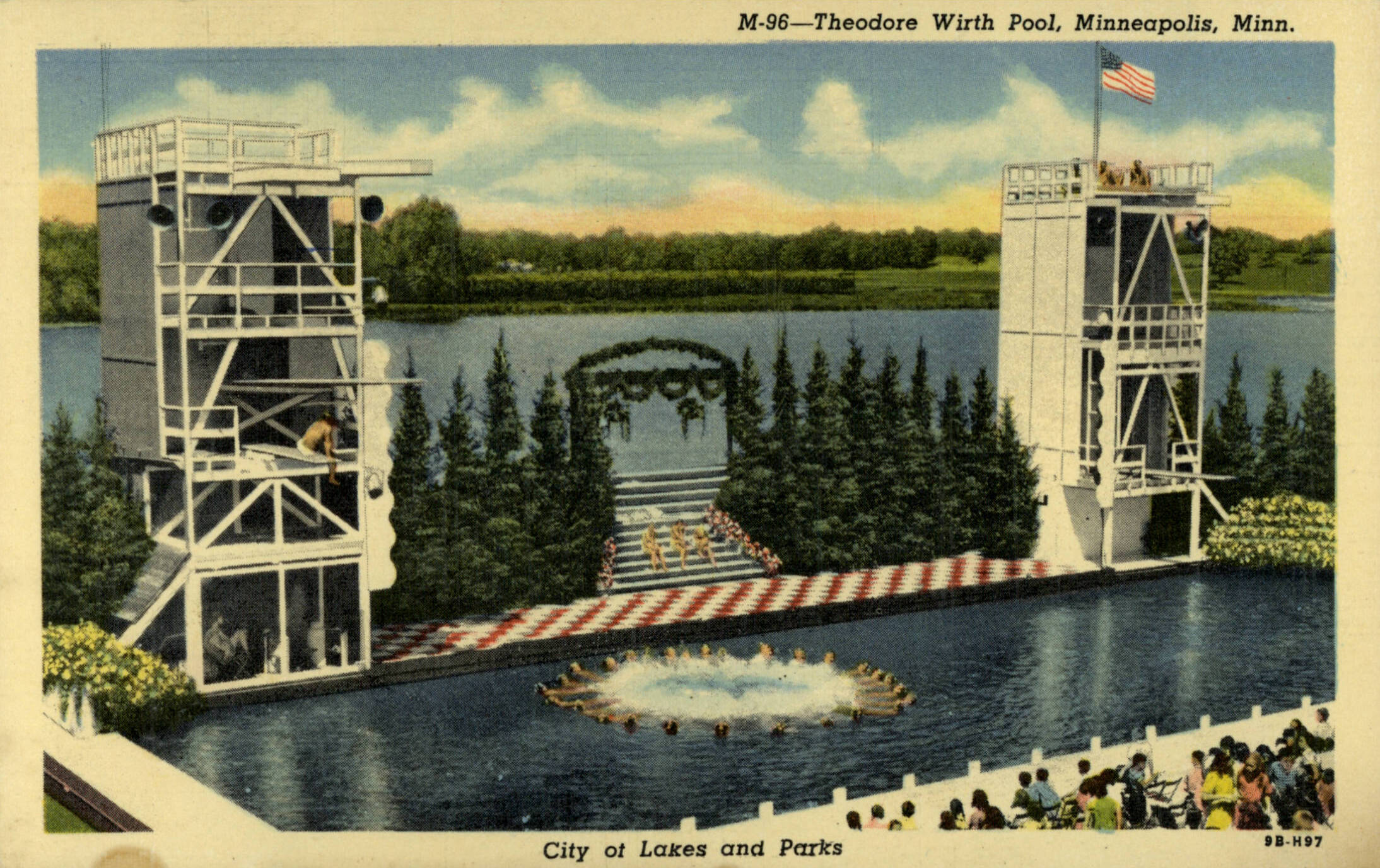
Sheehan produced the Aqua Follies at Theodore Wirth Park pool in Minneapolis.

Sheehan began producing and directing the Aqua Follies in 1943, at Theodore Wirth Park pool as part of the Minneapolis Aquatennial summer festival until 1964. The Aqua Follies began in 1940 operated the Aquatennial. Sheehan was previously connected with the Minneapolis Aquatennial when he produced the Over the Rainbow stage show in 1941. Serving as president of Aqua Follies Incorporated with business partner Lyle Wright as the treasurer, they transformed the show into a profitable business while conceding a portion of gate receipts to the Aquatennial.

The Aqua Follies was a water ballet show including 32 swimmers, 16 stage actors, a 16-person choir, and an 18-person band. The Aqua Dears performed the swimming portion of the show, while the Aqua Darlings danced on stage. Sheehan's production of the Aqua Follies took inspiration from Billy Rose's Aquacade at the Great Lakes Exposition. Searching for talent, Sheehan signed former Olympians Buster Crabbe and Vicki Draves; and competitive swimmers Hobie Billingsley, Gloria Callen, Patty Robinson Fulton, (Note: Recruited Patty Robinson Fulton. Fulton was inducted into the International Swimming Hall of Fame as a master diver in 2001.) and June Taylor. (Note: Recruited June Taylor. Taylor was a Canadian-born synchronized swimming champion of the United States, and inducted into the International Swimming Hall of Fame as a pioneer synchronized swimmer in 1991.) He also recruited gymnast and showman Larry Griswold.

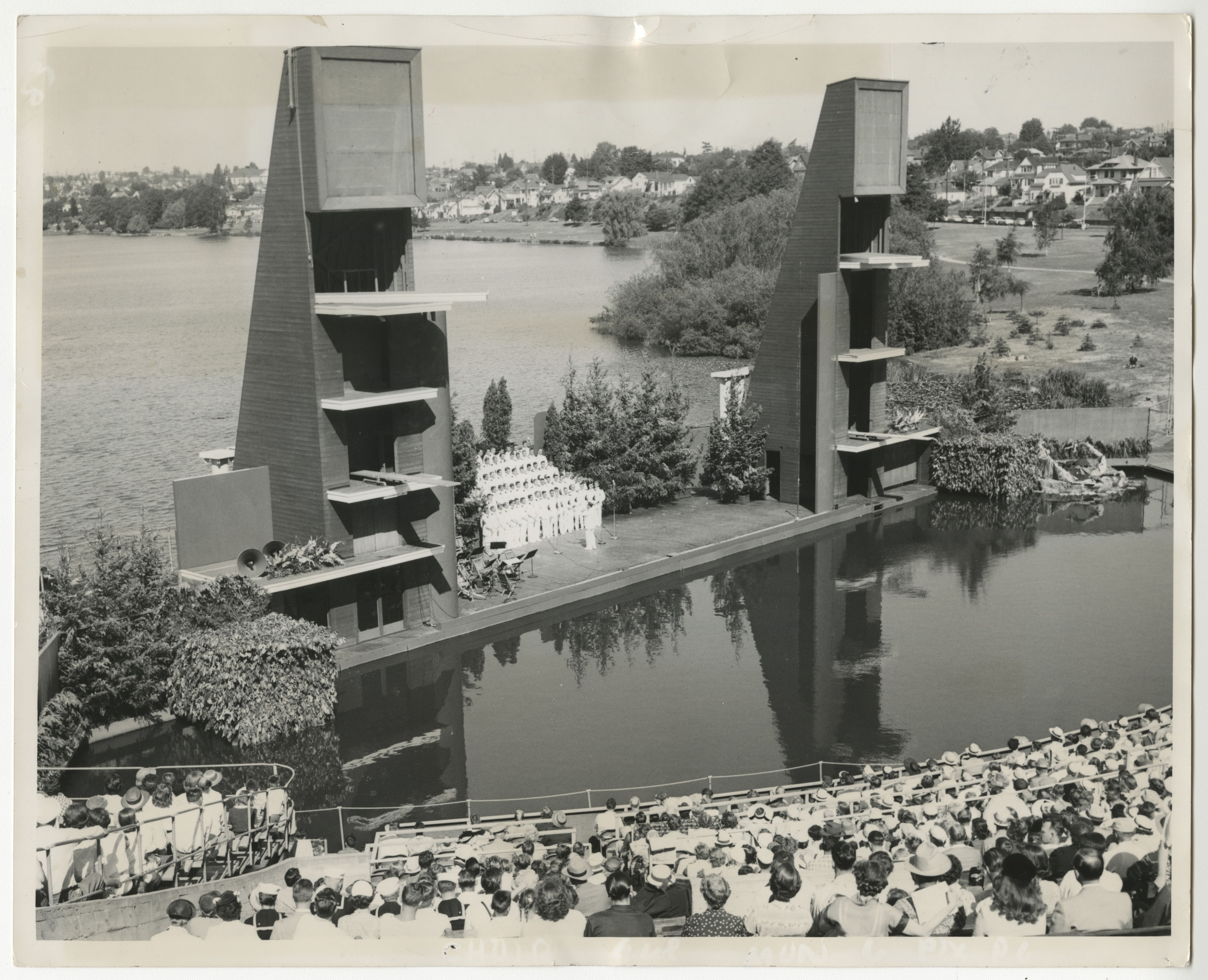
Sheehan produced the Aqua Follies at Green Lake Aqua Theater in Seattle.

The Aqua Follies had 16 performances per season in Minneapolis by 1947, and a ten-year/100-performance streak without rain outs as of 1951. Sheehan began a second version of the Aqua Follies in Seattle in 1950, which played for two weeks in August after its two weeks in Minneapolis. He later produced another version of the Aqua Follies at Belle Isle Park in Detroit.

The Seattle version of the Aqua Follies played at the Green Lake Aqua Theater during the annual Seafair festival from 1950 to 1965, with many of the same performers from Minneapolis. Shows were emceed by celebrities including Bob Hope and Bert Parks, and had sellout crowds of more than 5,000 people watching midnight performances. The Seattle Times described the Aqua Follies as "a swim-musical review", and "a slapstick medley of divers, dancers and synchronized swimmers performing a vaudeville-style lineup of skits and aquatic feats".

=== Later productions ===
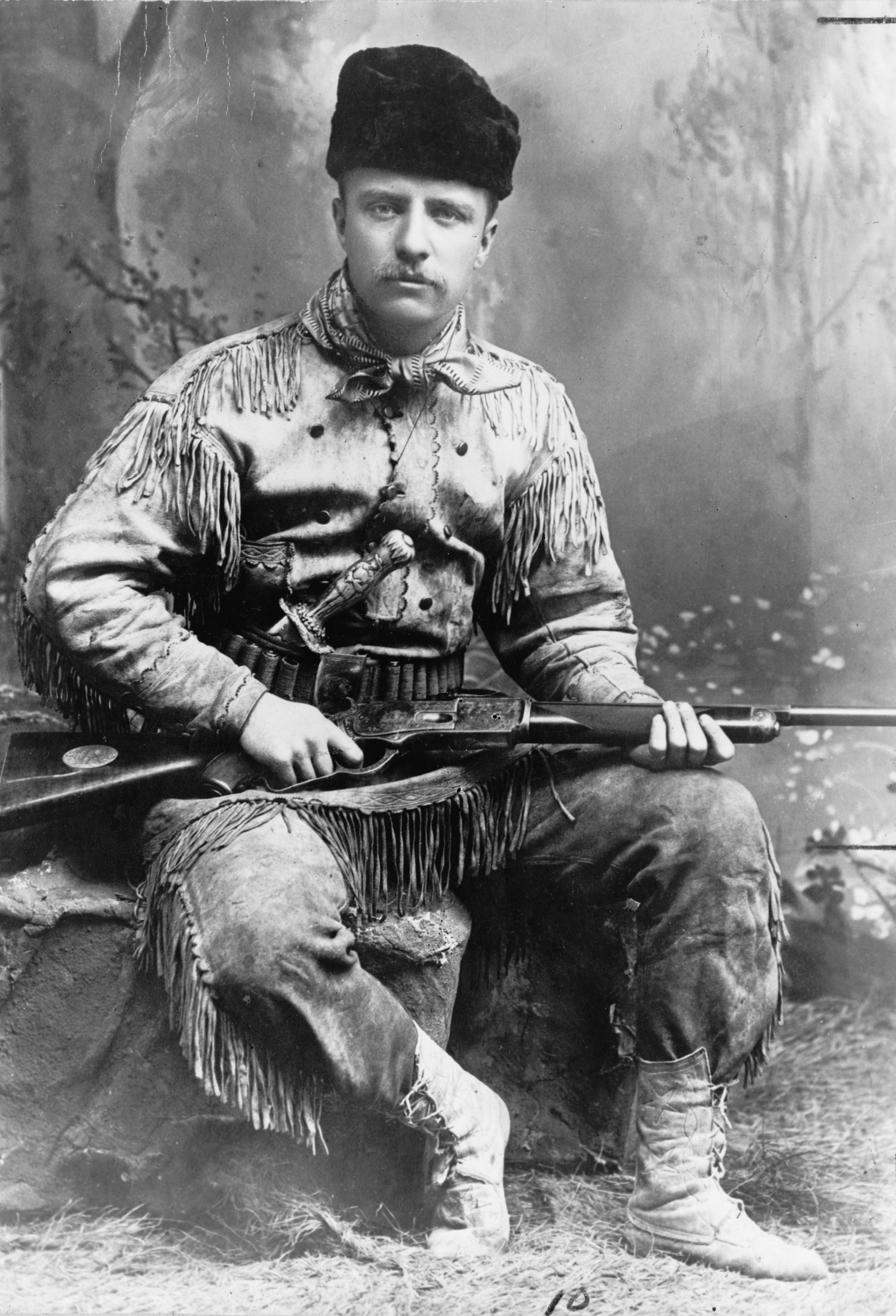
Sheehan produced a musical spectacular portraying Theodore Roosevelt in the North Dakota Badlands.

By the 1960s, Sheehan's agency booked more than 1,000 shows per year. He produced Minneapolis night club acts the Edgewater Eight at the Edgewater Inn, and the Golden Strings at the Radisson Hotel Flame Room. After the Edgewater Eight debuted in October 1962, theater critic Dan Sullivan wrote in the Minneapolis Tribune that it was a "new concept in night club entertainment" in which singers presented medleys of show tunes on the dance floor. Collaborating with hotel owner Curt Carlson, Sheehan formed the Golden Strings composed of eight violins, a double bass, and two grand pianos. The ensemble performed to more than two million people from 1963 to 1981, credited as the world's longest running violin show according to Variety magazine. Beginning in 1965, Sheehan produced an annual musical spectacular on the history of North Dakota performed at the Medora Musical, which included a portrayal of Teddy Roosevelt in the Badlands.

== Personal life ==
In December 1942, Sheehan married Bailey Levitan, known professionally as Rea Bailey, a former staff pianist and organist at WCCO and KSTP. They resided in Minneapolis, had a cottage on Lake Minnetonka, and their vacations to Florida and Texas doubled as talent searches for the Aqua Follies. His hobbies included recreational boating, astronomy, golf, movies, and reading about history and theater. He was president of the Minneapolis Kiwanis Club in 1949, and was a member of the American Legion, the Minneapolis Athletic Club, the Scottish Rite, and the Showmen's League of America. He was elected potentate of the Zuhrah Temple Shrine of Minneapolis in 1961.

After retirement, Sheehan was a resident of Minnetonka. He died on January 17, 1967, at Park Nicollet Methodist Hospital in St. Louis Park, and previously had a heart attack two years before. He is interred at Woodlawn Cemetery in Winona County, beside his wife who died in 1975.
