= Center for Performing Arts (Minneapolis) =

- Interactive map of Center for Performing Arts
- Address: 3754 Pleasant Avenue South; Minneapolis, Minnesota 55409; United States
- Coordinates: 44°56′4″N 93°17′1″W
- Capacity: 99

Construction
- Opened: 1995

Website
- cfpampls.com

Center for Performing Arts is a performing arts organization based in Minneapolis, Minnesota, United States. It was founded in 1995 by Jackie Hayes.

== History ==
Jackie Hayes founded the Center for Performing Arts (CFPA), LLC in 1995, and remains the Executive Director of the organization. Hayes attended high school in Marshall, Minnesota and college in Wisconsin, California and New York. She is a playwright and artist with a multi-disciplinary background that includes directing and writing.

== Venue ==
=== Historical Building ===
The organization has been located next to Church of the Incarnation, in a 96-year-old building that used to be a convent for about 30 teaching nuns. It closed as a convent and was converted to a women's shelter in 1981. In 1995 it was up for sale, and Hayes bought it. Hayes chose this inner-city location purposefully, in opposition to the belief that the arts are restricted to central, downtown locations. (Note: Hayes stated, “I’m a firm believer that deep and meaningful art-making can happen inside neighborhoods and communities where people live.”) Neighborhood arts centers - like multiple-use arts centers in the quieter suburbs - are becoming more common in cities and rural areas.

=== Expansion ===
Starting in 2019, planning for a four-story addition was underway to provide a 99-seat space for performances and other community events. In 2020 construction began on the 20,000-square-foot addition which will double the overall size and help the CFPA increase both its classes and its community resources. It will also increase accessibility

Stahl Construction is the builder and development consultant, Minneapolis-based Alliiance is the architect. The building plans are being modified due to the pandemic, the new space will have updated ventilation and other systems optimized for the post-pandemic period.

== Organizations ==
The current building includes 25 private studios as well as performance space. The artists musicians, writers, performing-arts companies and massage therapists. The Kingfield Neighborhood Association, a strong supporter of the center, also has offices there. Others that have been in the space include folk singer Ann Reed and her Turtle Club Productions organization; actress-producer Signe Albertson; and children's theater program Brazil which is run by Bob Davis and Mary Alette.

Cursor Literary Services (marketing service for publishers) and The Bakken Trio (chamber music ensemble) are some of the other arts tenants at CFPA. Dance/movement tenants include DanceMPLS, Middle Eastern Belly Dance, Green Dragon Kung Fu, MotionArt, Nia, and the Twin Cities Scottish Dance Company.

Some of the organizations joining the new space are Illusion Theater and Ragamala Dance Company.
