= Theatre Pro Rata =

Theatre company in Minneapolis, Minnesota

Theatre Pro Rata is a small, professional theatre company operating in the Twin Cities, United States. The company's name is derived from the term pro rata, which comes from the Latin for "in proportion." Their mission: To each of us: a foundation in the play, a pursuit of creative excellence, and a continuation of curiosity.

Formed in 2000 under the artistic direction of Carin Bratlie, the company gained local notoriety with Trainspotting as part of the 2002 Minnesota Fringe Festival. Shortly thereafter, Theatre Pro Rata began to produce regular seasons and has taken up residence at the Gremlin Theatre in Saint Paul, Minnesota.

In 2008, Metamorphoses was named one of the top ten productions of the year by Lavender Magazine and the set design for Killer Joe named among the best of 2008 by City Pages. In April 2009, Theatre Pro Rata produced David Hare's translation of Bertolt Brecht's The Life of Galileo, coinciding with the International Year of Astronomy and featuring a gender-blind cast led by Noë Tallen in the title role.

Beginning in 2015 with their production of The Illusion by Tony Kushner, Theatre Pro Rata will perform one show of each season at Park Square Theatre's new Andy Boss Thrust Stage as part of a theatrical collaboration between the two companies.

== Shows ==
2001: All Choked Up/White Noise
2002: Trainspotting (Talkin' Broadway review; City Pages review)
2004: Much Ado About Nothing; Emma (Talkin' Broadway review)
2005: Hamlet and Rosencrantz and Guildenstern Are Dead (Talkin' Broadway review)
2006: Slag Heap (Talkin' Broadway review); Machinal (Backstage review)
2007: Quills (Talkin' Broadway review; City Pages review); 365 Plays/365 Days; Feelgood Hits Of The 70s (City Pages review); Dusa, Fish, Stas, and Vi
2008: Metamorphoses (Minneapolis Star Tribune review; City Pages review; Talkin' Broadway review; The Rake review); Killer Joe (HowWasTheShow.com review; MSPMag.com review; Talkin' Broadway review; MinnPost.com review; City Pages review; Minneapolis Star Tribune review)
2009: The Life of Galileo (Minneapolis Star Tribune review; HowWasTheShow.com review; City Pages review); Monster (Minnesota Fringe Festival Reviews); Marisol (City Pages Review; TC Daily Planet Review)
2010: The Spanish Tragedy (TC Daily Planet Review); Traveling Light (MinniPost Review; City Pages Review); The Taming of The Shrew (TC Daily Planet Review)
2011: Dido, Queen of Carthage (TC Daily Planet Review); Waiting for Godot (HowWasTheShow.com Review; TC Daily Planet Review; Star Tribune Review; City Pages Review); Cat's Paw (TC Daily Planet Review; HowWasTheShow.com Review; Aisle Say Review; Star Tribune Review
2012: T Bone N Weasel (Star Tribune Review; City Pages Review); 44 Plays for 44 Presidents (Pioneer Press Review); Lovers & Executioners
2013: Neighborhood 3: Requisition of Doom; Emilie: La Marquise Du Châtelet Defends Her Life Tonight; Good Woman of Setzuan
2014: Elephant's Graveyard; Twelfth Night; 1984
2015: The Woodsman; The Illusion
