= Illusion Theater =

Illusion Theater is an independent theater company based in Minneapolis, Minnesota, United States. It was founded in 1974 by Michael Robins and Bonnie Morris. Their work on social issues has brought national acclaim, and their support of new playwrights has launched numerous careers. In 2021, Illusion completed a move to the Center for Performing Arts in the Kingfield neighborhood, after being located at the Hennepin Center for the Arts in Downtown Minneapolis prior to that.

== History ==
Bonnie Morris and Michael Robins founded Illusion Theater in 1974, to create silent plays. Morris had studied improvisation, and Robins had studied mime in France. For two years they explored that medium exclusively, then began to branch out. (Note: "We got to a place where we felt we did what we could in a silent form, following what our visions were," said Robins. "We had to explore another element. That's what led us to Orlando. We found a text we could adapt. It led us to the use of songs and dialogue.") Their first departure from silent work was their production of Orlando, Orlando, adapted from Virginia Woolf's novel Orlando. To create their production of Orlando and incorporate the elements of music, mime and physical movement, the six members engaged in readings and improvisation, and then in 1979 toured around Minnesota and elsewhere—continuing their improvisation along the way—and including dialogues with the audience as well. They continued to support new playwrights every season.

In the late 1970s and early 1980s Illusion Theater's "applied theater program" was created. It included programming designed to address specific social ills. Sexual abuse was addressed with groundbreaking work around Good Touch, Bad Touch created by Cordelia Anderson (then Kent) in collaboration with Hennepin County to help reduce the incidence of child sexual abuse. They presented the play called Touch—which broke new ground in helping children identify harmful actions—to thousands of people starting in 1982, around Minnesota and the U.S. In 1983 Illusion created a 34-minute video of 'Touch' narrated by Lindsay Wagner, .

Their initial name was The Illusion Theater and School, and works created for performance at schools was a primary activity. The Bush Foundation, the McKnight Foundation, the St. Paul Foundation, United Way, the Gannett Foundation and others provided partial funding for those activities, helping to make the Twin Cities an internationally recognized center of programming by and for children.

Another thrust of Illusion Theater's applied theater program directed at teenagers began with a production in the early 1980s called No Easy Answers that was performed around the state. In the 2000s they pioneered a peer-education program for high school students, funded in part by the National Endowment for the Arts.

In the mid-1980s, Illusion moved from a warehouse space on Washington Avenue in downtown Minneapolis to the Hennepin Center for the Arts on Hennepin Avenue. In the 1990s, Illusion developed two works for use in the workplace: Both Sides Now and Celebrating Diversity, which were performed at workplaces around the Twin Cities.

In September 2021, Illusion moved to the new wing of the Center for Performing Arts in South Minneapolis.

Support of new playwrights was always integral for Illusion Theater. In the mid-1980s Illusion staged a showcase of company members' new projects. In 1988, Illusion launched a long-running series of new works called Fresh Ink, in which new projects underway are workshopped and collaboratively honed with audience participation. Often those works continue to be developed, emerging on main stages at Illusion and elsewhere in future years. Some of the playwrights who launched their work in Fresh Ink include Dane Stauffer, Jeffrey Hatcher, Marion McClinton and Ping Chong.

Illusion Theater's budget includes ticket sales, group program revenue, and funding from the Minnesota State Arts Board and others.

== Programming ==
=== Education ===
School audiences have been integral to Illusion since the beginning. Good Touch, Bad Touch and the later version simply named Touch, as well as similar productions were presented to elementary schools around Minnesota and the U.S. in the late 1970s and early 1980s. As of 1985, the total audience for Touch and related sex abuse prevention programming had been presented to 475,000 people. In the late 1980s, Amazing Grace was brought to high schools around the state, as well as to Boston and New York. At the time it was thought that 1.5 million people had HIV, and 107,000 people had been diagnosed with AIDS. The goal was to provide awareness of both physical transmission of AIDS and its emotional and relationship effects - while carefully approaching the social context. Local government health service staff were involved in the community presentations. Other works were aimed at prevention of adolescent sexual abuse and family violence. Peace Up addressed fourth- through sixth- graders, and provided tools for dealing with anger and reducing the incidence of bullying.

=== Fresh Ink ===
Illusion presented the first Fresh Ink season in 1988, consisting of works-in-progress that the director shares with an audience as part of the crafting process. The long list of playwrights who have participated in Fresh Ink include Kim Hines, Mary Cryer, Lester Purry, Dane Stauffer, Buffy Sedlachek, T. Mychael Rambo, Gary Rue, Carolyn Goelzer, Ben Kreilkamp, Judy Mcguire, John Fleming, Louise Smith, Jeffrey Hatcher, Louise Smith, and many more. As with main stage productions, Fresh Ink often includes music and/or dance, like from the Women's Performance Project with Margie Fargnoli, Rebecca Frost, and others; a musical tribute to Gene Pitney by Gary Rue (who was Pitney's musical director for 16 years), and Spectrum -- An Array of New Songs by Peter Rothstein (a teen peer educator who participated in a production of Touch in his hometown in the mid-1980's). Comedy acts such as Amy Anderson are also frequently included.

=== Main Season ===
Illusion Theater's mainstage productions are almost exclusively original work, usually by Twin Cities artists—often works that have been nurtured in its Fresh Ink process. One early examples is Objects in the Mirror are Closer Than They Appear by Mark Cryer and Lester Purry which explored racism. Others are Letters from Hell by Dane Stauffer, The Warrior Within by Buffy Sedlachek and Men Sing by Michael Robins and Gary Rue.

Some artists return to Illusion Theater regularly, including Miss Richfield 1981 who explores gender identity through humor, and appears on Illusion's stage most years. Others have included Leslie Ball, Aimee K. Bryant, Vanessa Gamble, Robert Hartmann, and Peter Vitale. Illusion's production range from full musicals to noir dramas to comedies, all in the service of illuminating the illusions of the human condition.

Among their work that has prompted specific community responses, Illusion's Pulitzer Prize-nominated play Miss Evers' Boys by David Feldshuh on the Tuskegee Syphilis Study is probably the best known. In 1991–92, Illusion worked with the Center for Biomedical Ethics at the University of Minnesota and the Urban Coalition on national symposia around racial health disparities.

== Founders ==
Bonnie Morris and Michael Robins, 2014 Ivey Award winners.

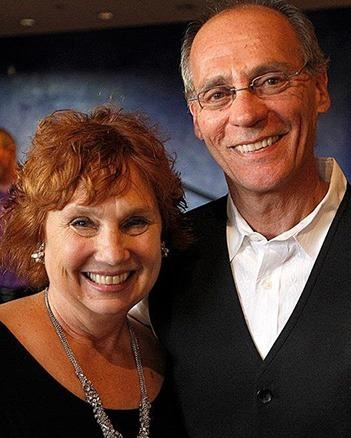
Bonnie Morris and Michael Robins
