= 15 Head Theatre Lab =

15 HEAD - a theatre lab was a non-profit, professional, experimental theatre company based in Minneapolis, Minnesota.

== History ==
The company was founded in 1995 by directors Julia Fischer and Greg Smucker, and designer Joe Stanley. 15 HEAD focused on creating original company works, employing a unique method of communal creation to bring their productions to the stage.

Following two years at Old Arizona studios, they became a resident company at the Red Eye Theater in Minneapolis in 1997. Several former members went on the create the Minneapolis-based company known as Sandbox Theatre.

In its final years (after the departure of two of the original founders), the remaining company members utilized methods popularized by Anne Bogart and the SITI Company. The company was awarded a Jerome Foundation grant for their work in 2002 and 2004. 15 HEAD produced plays and offered classes in the Viewpoints method in Minneapolis from 1995, until the dissolution of the company in 2005.

== Style ==
15 HEAD's productions were marked by a signature style featuring intense physical movement that included music, dance and visually dynamic design.

A unique feature of 15 HEAD was its use of a broad, cross-disciplinary, collaborative rehearsal process. The company of professional directors, designers, actors and writers ignored the traditional problems between their specializations, so that all participants could provide input into each aspect of the production. Although 15 HEAD was inspired by stories, legends and myths through an extensive discovery and rehearsal process, the finished product reflected the individual and collective strengths of each of the company members.

== Awards ==
Top Ten Shows of 1999 for The Mountain Giants -City Pages

== Founders ==
- Joe Stanley
- Julia Fischer
- Greg Smucker

== Shows ==
- 1996: Lulu
- 1997: She Must Be Dreaming: Impressions of Wuthering Heights
- 1998: The Lady from the Sea; meFausto (review); Don Juan
- 1999: The Mountain Giants (review); Dracula
- 2000: Aria; The Insatiate Countess
- 2001: Coco; Cheri; RED/instructions to follow
- 2002: The Rush; The Enchanted (review)
- 2003: The VI Wives of Henry VIII; Sacred Space; Oil on Canvas
- 2005: Vacationland
