= Gloria Callen =

American backstroke swimmer

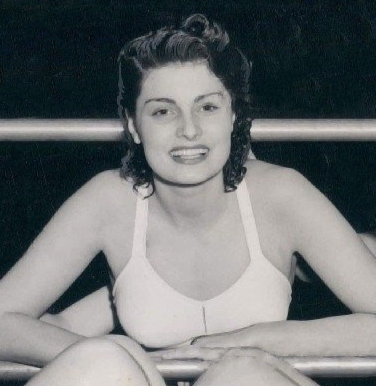
- Callen in a 1942 Press Photo after a New York competition

Personal information
- Full name: Gloria Marie Callen
- Born: December 21, 1923 Freeport, New York, United States
- Died: September 2, 2016 (aged 92) Charleston, West Virginia
- Education: Barnard College (1946)
- Occupations: American Women's Voluntary Service; Kanawha Garden Club (W. Virginia); Garden Club of America Executive; Barnard College Trustee
- Spouse: Herbert Erskine Jones Jr. (1944)
- Children: 4

Sport
- Sport: Swimming
- Strokes: Freestyle; Backstroke
- Club: Stamford Yacht Club (Connecticut); Women's Swimming Assoc. (New York)
- Coach: Eddie Mack (Stamford Yacht Club); Louis de Breda Handley (WSA)

Gloria Marie Callen (December 21, 1923 – September 2, 2016), also known by her married name Gloria Marie Jones was an American distance freestyle and backstroke swimming champion who competed for New York's Women's Swimming Association and was a world record holder. Though she qualified for the 1940 U.S. Olympic team in backstroke, she was unable to compete as the Olympics were not held that year due to the Second World War. Continuing to compete, she was the 1942 Associated Press Athlete of the Year, and a New York Fashion Academy award winner the same year. After marrying in 1944, she graduated Barnard College in 1946. She settled in Charleston, West Virginia in 1951 where she volunteered with the Kawanha Garden Club and was on the executive board of the Garden Club of America. Returning to New York for short stints, she served as a Barnard College Trustee from 1986-1991.

== Early life ==
Callen was born December 21, 1923 in Freeport, New York to father Caspar Robinson Callen and mother Florence Mooney Callen. She attended New York's Nyack High School where she served as Senior Class President. At the Madison Square Boys Club in her High School Junior year, she set six American swimming records.

=== Early swimming ===
She began swimming at age 7. At nine, she won the overall girl's competition at the Stamford Yacht Club meet on July 4, 1933, which consisted of short races, some diving, and swimming underwater. At the July 4 meet, she finished third in a 35-yard sprint competition. Continuing to represent the Stamford girl's swimming team later that month, Callen was part of a winning three-girl cross pool relay. At the Stamford Yacht Club team, Callen was managed and trained by club coach Eddie Mack. In August of 1935, at the age of 11, she again won the girls 12 and under age-group competition for the Stamford Club team, leading them to a 55-47-5 victory over the Larchmont and Riverside Clubs. A strong distance competitor, at 13 Callen won the 500-yard freestyle swim of the Junior A.A.U. Metropolitan Championship with a time of 7:05:3, finishing four yards ahead of second place swimmer Claire Daily.

=== Distance champion ===
WSA Coach Louis Handley in 1907

Representing the well-known program at the Women's Swimming Association (WSA) of New York at 15, Callen placed a close second in the AAU Long Distance Championship on August 20, 1939 in a three mile race, at Clementon Lake New Jersey, leading the WSA to a team championship. At the WSA, Callen was coached by Hall of Fame inductee Louis de Breda Handley, a former 1904 Olympic 4x50 yard freestyle gold medalist. At the age of 14 in 1938, Callen had won the three-mile race with a course record time of 1 hour, 21 minutes, 7.5 seconds. She led the entire race, and at one point held a 200-yard lead. Callen continued to represent the Women's Swimming Association up until her swimming retirement around 1942.

=== Backstroke championship ===
Distinguishing herself as a backstroke Champion, Callen won the 110-yard AAU backstroke event 1:18:5 in Portland, Oregon on August 17, 1940. The event helped qualify her for the U.S. Women's 1940 Olympic team. She was also part of a winning 330-yard medley relay team for the Women's Swimming Association.

=== Marriage ===
She married Herbert Erskine Jones Jr. at the Columbia University Chapel on the evening of Saturday, October 14, 1944. Serving at the time in the U.S. Navy as a submariner in the Pacific, Lieutenant Jones was a graduate of the Lawrenceville School, and of Princeton University in 1943. A college athlete at Princeton, he was a member and captain of the crew team, and a President of the Colonial Club.

=== Swimming career summary ===
Callen set 35 American records and one world record in the medley relay in swimming, and won a total of 13 American championships. Her American championships were held primarily in the 100-yard freestyle event, the 3-mile Open Water Distance Race, the 100-yard backstroke and several medley relays. She switched from specializing in freestyle distance events to backstroke events prior to the 1940 Olympics. Due to World War II, she was never able to compete in world championships or Olympic Games, even though she qualified for the 1940 Summer Olympics.

Callen was one in a row of glamorous swimming champions, and was voted one of America's 13 best-dressed women by New York's Fashion Academy winning the New York Fashion Academy Award in 1942.

=== Aqua Follies ===
In 1943, Al Sheehan recruited Callen to perform as part of the Aqua Follies, a water ballet show including diving acts.

== Life after swimming ==
=== Education ===
In the Fall of 1943 she quit swimming after enrolling at Barnard College, the women's school associated with Columbia University. She graduated Barnard in 1946, having joined the American Women's Voluntary Services (AWVS), which during World War II helped with a variety of essential services that included the driving of ambulances, the sale of war bonds, and operating relief kitchens and canteens. In 1944 Callen-Jones attended classes at Connecticut College, and continued making summer appearances for the Red Cross.

=== Volunteer work ===
Living for a short while in San Francisco, after 1945, Gloria and her husband relocated to West Virginia's Logan County where her husband Herbert worked for the Amherst Coal Company. Herbert's father had also worked in the Coal industry. In 1951, the couple moved to Charleston, West Virginia with their three children. Gloria taught YMCA swimming and was a Junior League volunteer. She was active in the Kanawha Garden Club after 1967, serving as President in 1978-9 and chaired the Regional branch of the Garden Club of America. She was on the Garden Club of America's Executive committee through 1993. From 1986-1991, she was a Barnard College trustee, spending some of her time in New York.

Gloria Jones died at the age of 92 on September 2, 2016, and was survived by her four children and seven grand-children. She was pre-deceased by her husband Herbert. She had a number of caretakers as part of Kanawha Hospice Care. On Saturday September 10, a memorial service was held at Charleston's St. John’s Episcopal Church, on Quarrier Street where she had been a member.

== Honors ==
- 1942: Associated Press Athlete of the Year
- 1976: inducted in the Rockland County Sports Hall of Fame
- 1984: International Swimming Hall of Fame Honor Swimmer

== See also ==
- List of members of the International Swimming Hall of Fame
