= David Bolger =

Irish choreographer, dancer and stage director (born 1968)

- Born: 1968 (age 57–58); Dublin, Ireland
- Known for: choreography
- Notable work: The Wolf and Peter
- Movement: contemporary dance
- Elected: Aosdána (2007)
- Website: coisceim.com

David Bolger (born 1968) is an Irish choreographer, dancer and theatrical director. He is a member of Aosdána, an elite Irish association of artists.

== Early life ==
Bolger was born in Dublin in 1968 and grew up in Sandymount; he lived next to the singer Agnes Bernelle and actor Christopher Casson. His father was a haulage contractor.

== Career ==
Bolger enrolled in Dublin City Ballet aged 16.

He founded the dance company CoisCéim (Irish: "footstep") in 1995.

In 2001, he co-wrote and choreographed the film Hit and Run, which won the Paula Citron Award for Choreography for the Camera at the Moving Pictures Festival, Toronto and the Jury Prize at the Dance on Camera Festival. He was nominated at the American Choreography Awards.

Bolger was the choreographer for the film Dancing at Lughnasa (1998).

He created A Dash of Colour for the opening ceremony of the 2003 Special Olympics World Summer Games.

In 2007 he was elected to Aosdána.

In 2011 he won an Ivey Award for his work on the Guthrie Theater's H.M.S. Pinafore.

In 2022 he directed Orfeo ed Euridice at the Blackwater Valley Opera Festival.
