= Gremlin Theatre =

Theatre company in St. Paul, Minnesota, USA

Gremlin Theatre is a small, nonprofit, professional theatre company based in St. Paul, Minnesota, United States. Gremlin primarily performs actor-centered plays in the classic American style of realism, seeking, as their mission statement reads, "to provide artistically brilliant, accessible, and enjoyable theatrical experiences." Recently, Gremlin has turned its attention to producing new plays by local Twin Cities playwrights and to bringing Equity actors into their casts. They are the resident company at the Loading Dock a small theater space which was constructed out of an unused warehouse/loading space in the basement of the Renaissance Box, a former warehouse in St. Paul that has been retrofitted into an arts/office complex. The Renaissance Box staff credits the staff of Gremlin with all of the work it took to create the Loading Dock, which has played home to other small theatre companies in the Twin Cities, including Starting Gate Productions and Theatre Pro Rata.

The Gremlin Theater recently moved to a new theater space on the corner of University Avenue and Raymond Avenue, in Saint Paul.

Peter Hansen is the artistic director and Carl Schoenborn is the Technical Director.

== Shows ==
- 2000: The London Cuckolds review)
- 2002: The Odd Couple; Independence (review)
- 2003: The Venetian Twins; Two Rooms; Bus Stop; A Doll's House (review)
- 2004: Blithe Spirit (review 1; review 2); The Crucible; Orphans (review)
- 2005: Lend Me a Tenor; Wait Until Dark; A Devil Inside (review); A Long Day's Journey Into Night (review 1; review 2); On the Verge
- 2006: The Boys Next Door; Almost Exactly Like Us (review); "Hay Fever"; The Petrified Forest; To All Men Named Jackson (review)
