= Ivey Awards =

Former annual theater awards show

- Awarded for: Outstanding achievements in Twin Cities professional theater
- Description: The Ivey Awards were an annual award show, celebrating Twin Cities professional theater, recognizing outstanding achievements in direction, performance, design, etc. The awards ceased in 2018 due to lack of funding.
- Location: State Theater, Minneapolis
- Country: United States
- Presented by: Scott Mayer
- First award: 2004
- Final award: 2018

The Ivey Awards were an annual award show, celebrating Twin Cities (Minneapolis/Saint Paul, Minnesota) professional theater. Established in 2004, the non-nomination based awards served to recognize outstanding achievements within the past theater season in direction, performance, design, etc. The awards were founded by Scott Mayer and administered by a panel of local theater professionals and theater patrons. The Iveys ceased in 2018 due to lack of funding.

The Iveys were held each year in September at the historic State Theater, in the theater district of Minneapolis.

== About the Award Ceremony ==
The IVEY awards were created in 2004 in an effort to acknowledge the ever-growing Twin Cities theater community, while providing theater professionals and theater-goers an "annual celebration and recognition ceremony," honoring the previous year's theater season and theatrical accomplishments. The evening of entertainment and awards consists of performances from the past year of theater (ranging from musical theater, dance, scenes), award presentation, and lifetime achievement recognition. Typically, the award presenters, entertainment and hosts are local theater professionals and celebrities. However, the occasional nationally known celebrity, having recent local theatrical experience, has hosted the event and/or presented an award.

== Details of the IVEY Awards ==
Because of the celebratory nature of the IVEY awards, there is not a pre-determined number of awards nor pre-existing categories. Furthermore, the awards are not meant to be a competition, thus there are no nominees.

However, there are three general categories included in the recognition ceremony:

- Awards for lifetimes achievement and an emerging artist(determined by representatives of all theater organizations participating in the project)
- Awards for theater highlights (determined by a group of over 100 volunteer evaluators and the theater-going public)
- Recognition for work in the areas of production, design, direction, performance, and special citations (determined by the group of volunteer evaluators and theater-going public)

=== Eligibility ===
Note: all information taken from IVEY Theater Eligibility Requirements

Organizations that elect to participate in the project and be considered for Ivey Awards recognition must represent themselves as a professional theater organization.

Professional theater organizations that wish to participate or be considered for an award must:

- Be registered in the State of Minnesota as a 501(c)(3) organization or a for-profit business.
- Have been producing work and in existence for at least one year.
- Compensate their artists and staff on a regular basis.
- Be based in and produce in the Twin Cities’ seven county metropolitan area.
- Provide between six and ten complimentary tickets for each production to be evaluated that are valid for performance dates selected by the assigned evaluators.

All work eligible for an award must:

- Be produced by an eligible theater organization.
- Be scripted.
- Have a run of at least ten days or over two weekends.

The awards will not cover touring theater or college and university theater.

=== Recognition Evaluation Process ===
The process of evaluation was developed to include many theater perspectives. The opinions of a group of 100 evaluators, who represent many aspects of the theater audience (theater professionals [actors, directors, designers], general theater-goers, donors, etc.), attend performances and evaluate certain aspects of each performance. These opinions are collected and further evaluated by the IVEY Award panel, and awards are then decided upon.

Furthermore, all opinions from any audience member can contribute to the evaluation process by submittal to the IVEY Award panel, via the official website.

== Awards and recipients ==
=== 2005 ===
2005 Ivey Awards (September 26, 2005)
Honor	Recipients	Producing theater, if applicable
Productions	The Miser	Theatre de la Jeune Lune
Productions	Death of a Salesman	Guthrie Theater
Productions	La Bohème	Theater Latté Da
Productions	A Year with Frog and Toad	Children's Theatre Company
Productions	PSST!	Off-Leash Area
Artists	Joe Chvala	
Artists	Marcus Dilliard	
Artists	Steve Hendrickson	
Artists	Helen Huang	
Artists	Kimberly Joy Morgan	
Artists	Stacia Rice	
Emerging Artist Award	Nathan Christopher	
Lifetime Achievement Award	Lou Bellamy	

=== 2006 ===
==== Productions ====
- Sez She, emotional impact—Illusion Theater
- The Talk: An Intercourse of Coming of Age, unique concept -- Youth Performance Company
- I Am Anne Frank, direction (Ben Krywoscz) and musical direction (Mindy Eschedor) -- Nautilus Music Theater

==== Individuals ====
- Gerry Giouard, choreography -- Crimes and Whispers, Off Leash Area
- Barry Kornhauser, playwriting -- Reeling, Children's Theatre Company
- Jim Lichtsheidl, creation -- Knock, Theatre Latte Da
- Joel Sass, set design -- Last of the Boys, Jungle Theater

==== Actor Honorees ====
- Bradley Greenwald -- I Am My Own Wife, Jungle Theater
- Dean Holt -- Reeling, Children's Theatre Company

==== Emerging Artist Award ====
Christiana Clark, performer

==== Lifetime Achievement Award ====
Jack Reuler, Artistic Director

=== 2007 ===
==== Productions ====
- Don Giovanni, musical direction and performances—Theatre de la Jeune Lune
- Love, Janis, musical direction and performances -- Ordway Center for the Performing Arts
- Messy Utopia, innovative concept and idea -- Mixed Blood Theatre

==== Individual Honorees ====
- John Arnone, scenic design -- Private Lives, Guthrie Theater
- Michael Matthew Ferrell, choreography—Disney's High School Musical, Children's Theatre Company
- Mike Hallenbeck, sound design -- Kid-Simple and Hunger, Emigrant Theater

==== Actor Honorees ====
- Thomas W. Jones, II -- Yellowman, Mixed Blood Theatre
- Kris Nelson -- Wellstone!, History Theatre
- Edward Williams Jr. -- Kiss of the Spider Woman, Minneapolis Musical Theater
- Sally Wingert -- Woman Before a Glass, Minnesota Jewish Theatre

==== Emerging Artist Award ====
Kate Sutton-Johnson, scenic designer

==== Lifetime Achievement Award ====
Sheila Livingston

=== 2008 ===
==== Productions ====
- Broken Brain Summit, innovative concept and idea—Interact Center
- Night Mother, overall excellence -- Workhouse Theatre Company
- Cabaret, costume design, scenic design & choreography—Ordway Center for the Performing Arts
- The Pillowman, emotional impact—Frank Theatre
- A Prelude to Faust, overall excellence—Open Eye Figure Theatre

==== Individual Honorees ====
- Tamara Kangas, choreography -- 42nd Street, Chanhassen Dinner Theatres

==== Actor Honorees ====
- Kate Eifrig -- 9 Parts of Desire, Guthrie Theater
- Jairus Abts -- Hedwig and the Angry Inch, Jungle Theater
- James A. Williams -- Fences, Penumbra Theatre Company
- Garry Geiken, Katie Guentzel, John Middleton, Carolyn Pool, Matt Rein, Alan Sorenson -- Orson's Shadow, Gremlin Theatre

==== Emerging Artist Award ====
Matthew Amendt, playwright and performer

==== Lifetime Achievement Award ====
Don Stoltz

=== 2009 ===
==== Productions ====
- Little Rock, 1957, Youth Performance Company
- Tyrone & Ralph, History Theatre
- Old Wicked Songs, Theatre Latte Da

==== Individual Honorees ====
- Greg Banks, Direction -- Romeo and Juliet, by the Children's Theatre Company
- Chris Griffith, Props Puppet Design -- Herschel and the Hanukkah Goblins by Minnesota Jewish Theatre Company
- Sean Healey, Sound Design

‘’Shipwrecked’’ by The Jungle Theater

==== Actor Honorees ====
- Christina Baldwin and Jennifer Baldwin Peden-- Sister Stories, by Nautilus Music- Theater
- Luveme Seifert-- 800 Words: The Transmigration of Phillip Dick, by Workhaus Theatre Collective
- Greta Oglesby -- Caroline or Change by the Guthrie Theater
- Sonja Parks-- No Child by Pillsbury House Theatre

==== Emerging Artist Award ====
Emily Gunyou Halaas, Performer

==== Lifetime Achievement Award ====
Dudley Riggs

=== 2010 ===
==== Productions ====
- Mary’s Wedding, the Jungle Theater
- Ruined, Mixed Blood Theatre
- Othello, Ten Thousand Things Theater

==== Individual Honorees ====
- Aaron Gabriel, Music -- "Madame Majesta’s Miracle Medicine Show", Interact Theater
- Allison Moore, Playwright -- "My Antonia", Illusion Theater
- Joseph Stanley: Scenic Design -- "Mulan, Jr. ", Children's Theatre Company
- Tulle & Dye: Costumes -- "Beauty & The Beast", Ordway Center for the Performing Arts

==== Actor Honorees ====
- Katie Guentzel -- "My Antonia", Illusion Theater
- Regina Marie Williams -- "Ruined", Mixed Blood Theatre

==== Emerging Artist Award ====
Kalere Payton, Costume Designer

==== Lifetime Achievement Award ====
Wendy Lehr, Actress

=== 2011 ===
==== Productions ====
- Doubt, Ten Thousand Things
- The 7-Shot Symphony, Live Action Set

==== Individual Honorees ====
- Craig Johnson, Director -- "Street Scene" Girl Friday Productions
- Gary Rue, Music -- "Buddy– The Buddy Holly Story", History Theatre
- David Bolger, Choreographer -- "H.M.S. Pinafore", Guthrie Theater

==== Actor Honorees ====
- Peter Christian Hansen -- "Burn This" Gremlin Theatre
- Dennis Spears -- "I Wish You Love" Penumbra Theatre Company
- Ben Bakken -- "Jesus Christ Superstar" Chanhassen Dinner Theatres

==== Emerging Artist Award ====
Anna Sundberg, Actress

==== Lifetime Achievement Award ====
Bain Boehlke

=== 2012 ===
==== Productions ====
- Compleat Female Stage Beauty, Walking Shadow Theatre Company
- Spring Awakening, Theatre Latte Da
- Ballad of the Pale Fisherman, Illusion Theater
- Julius Caesar, Theatre Unbound

==== Individual Honorees ====
- Barry Browning, Lighting Design -- "Dial M for Murder", Jungle Theater
- Miriam Monasch, Directing -- "Our Class", Minnesota Jewish Theatre Company
- Joe Vass, Musical Direction -- "The Soul of Gershwin: The Musical Journey of an American", Klezme

==== Actor Honorees ====
- Tracie Bennett -- "End of the Rainbow", Guthrie Theater
- Hugh Kennedy -- "Buzzer", Pillsbury House Theatre
- Jody Briskey -- "Beyond the Rainbow: Garland at Carnegie Hall", History Theatre

==== Emerging Artist Award ====
Isabel Nelson, Actress and Artistic Director

==== Lifetime Achievement Award ====
Rick Shiomi

=== 2013 ===
==== Productions ====
- In the Next Room, Jungle Theater
- Milly & Tillie, Open Eye Figure Theatre

==== Individual Honorees ====
- Peter Beard & James Napoleon Stone, Directing-- "Hamlet", Theatre Coup d'État
- Raymond Berg, Musical Direction -- "Urinetown: The Musical", Jungle Theater
- Peter Brosius, Directing -- "If You Give a Mouse a Cookie", Children's Theatre Company
- Michael Croswell, Sound Design -- "Misterman", Frank Theatre
- Ensemble, Acting -- "Clybourne Park", Guthrie Theater
- Ensemble, Acting -- "Two Sugars, Room for Cream", Hennepin Theatre Trust
- Michael Matthew Ferrell, Choreography -- "Singin’ in the Rain", Bloomington Civic Theatre
- Katherine Glover, Alissa M. Shellito & Jeri Weiss, Playwriting -- "Freshwater Theatre Goes Back to High School", Freshwater Theatre Company

==== Actor Honorees ====
- Dean Holt, Acting -- "If You Give a Mouse a Cookie", Children's Theatre Company
- Craig Johnson, Acting -- "Gross Indecency: The Three Trials of Oscar Wilde", Walking Shadow Theatre Company

==== Emerging Artist Award ====
Ricardo Vázquez, Actor, Director and Playwright

==== Lifetime Achievement Award ====
Jeffrey Hatcher, Playwright

=== 2014 ===
==== Productions ====
- Cabaret, Latte Da and Hennepin Theatre Trust
- Ordinary Days, Nautilus Music-Theater

==== Individual Honorees ====
- Ensemble, Intellect and Emotional Intensity -- "Rose", MN Jewish Theatre Company
- Anne Byrd, Directing -- "The 39 Steps", Yellow Tree Theatre
- Ensemble, Acting -- "Driving Miss Daisy", Jungle Theater
- Seraphina Nova, Playwright -- "Dogwood", Candid Theater Company
- Eduardo Sicangco, Set Design/Costumes -- "Cinderella", Children's Theatre Company
- Sandy Spieler and Julie Boada, Properties Design -- "Between the Worlds", Heart of the Beast

==== Actor Honorees ====
- Sally Wingert, Acting—Four productions in 2013–14
- Nathan Cousins and Tristan Tifft, Acting -- "The 39 Steps", Yellow Tree Theatre

==== Emerging Artist Award ====
Tyler Michaels, Actor

==== Lifetime Achievement Award ====
Michael Robins and Bonnie Morris, Co-Producing Directors
