= Minneapolis Aquatennial =

Annual outdoor event in Minneapolis, USA

Coordinates: 44.9773°N 93.2654°W

The Minneapolis Aquatennial is an annual outdoor event held in the U.S. city of Minneapolis, Minnesota, during the third full week of July. The Aquatennial was first celebrated in 1940 and was designed to celebrates the city's lakes, rivers, and streams.

Members of the anti-union Citizens Alliance founded the festival and claimed the festival was created just to increase tourism in Minneapolis, while labor historians agree it was connected to the Minneapolis general strike of 1934 and the annual picnics held by local unions to commemorate the strike and honor those who were killed. The Aquatennial was designed "to take the minds of Minneapolis citizens off past troubles and focus all minds throughout the state on some pleasant event" and came to overshadow the overshadowing the teamster picnics.

The business community that organized the first few festivals emphasized the presence of labor leaders in the organizing committees and use of union labor to create the festival. Local historians, such as Peter Rachleff and Iric Nathanson, described the early goals of the festival as ways to heal community division between social classes.

== "Best Days of Summer" ==
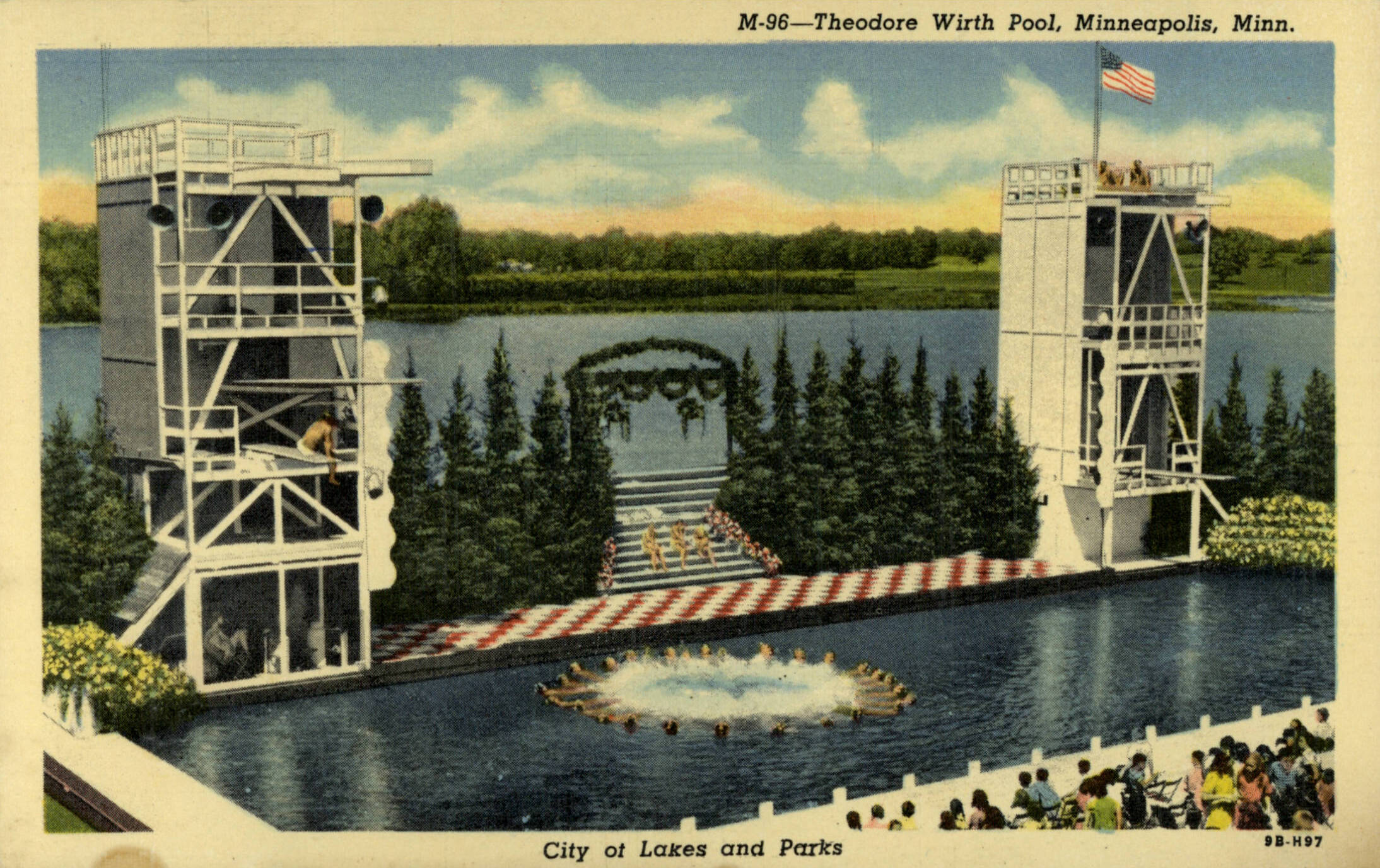
Aqua Follies at Theodore Wirth Park, undated postcard.

Advertised as The Best Days of Summer the festivities initially included some 200 events over 10 days (hence Aqua-ten-ial), at one point or another including the Aqua Follies, the Xcel Energy Sand Castle Competition, the Tom Thumb Milk Carton Boat Races, the Ultimate Wireless Co-ed Beach Volleyball Tournament, a sailing regatta, a tennis invitational, the Life Time Fitness Triathlon, many parades, among them the Minnegasco Torchlight Parade, the Master of International Management presents Shakespeare in the Park, Subway Block Party and the final Target Fireworks, one of the largest in the country, much larger than the city's Fourth of July celebration.

== History ==
The Aquatennial featured the Aqua Follies water ballet show produced by Al Sheehan, at the Theodore Wirth Park Pool from 1940 until 1964. The Aqua Follies included the Aqua Dears, a synchronized swimming troupe with strict height and weight limits of 5'4" and 125 lbs

In 1971 the Tom Thumb Milk Carton Boat Races was conceived by advertising executives looking to drum up sales.

Minneapolis celebrated its centennial in 1956 in conjunction with the Aquatennial. The city's sesquicentennial was July 18–27, 2008, the year Minnesota celebrated 150 years of statehood. (Note: Minneapolis was recognized as a town by the state legislature in 1856, and was incorporated in 1858. The year of the sesquicentennial celebration was based on the incorporation date to align the city's celebration with the state's sesquicentennial celebration.)

The Aquatennial was cancelled from 1942 to 1945 because of World War II, and in 2020 because of the COVID-19 pandemic.

In October 2025, the Minneapolis Downtown Council announced that it would no longer be producing the festival. The Aquatennial Ambassador Organization began organizing the event starting in 2026.

== Scholarship program ==
The Queen of the Lakes Scholarship Program is a week-long candidate program for women ages 18–22 that is held in Minneapolis in conjunction with the Minneapolis Aquatennial every July.

The Queen of the Lakes and two Aquatennial Princesses are chosen to represent the festival and city of Minneapolis all over the state, nation and world. Fifty young women representing communities throughout the state of Minnesota participate in the program.

== Gallery ==
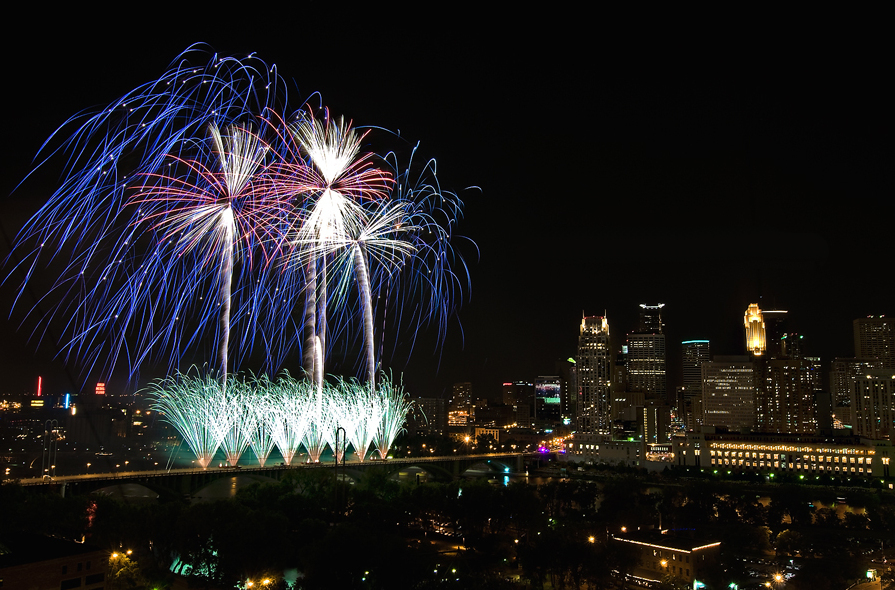
Minneapolis Fireworks

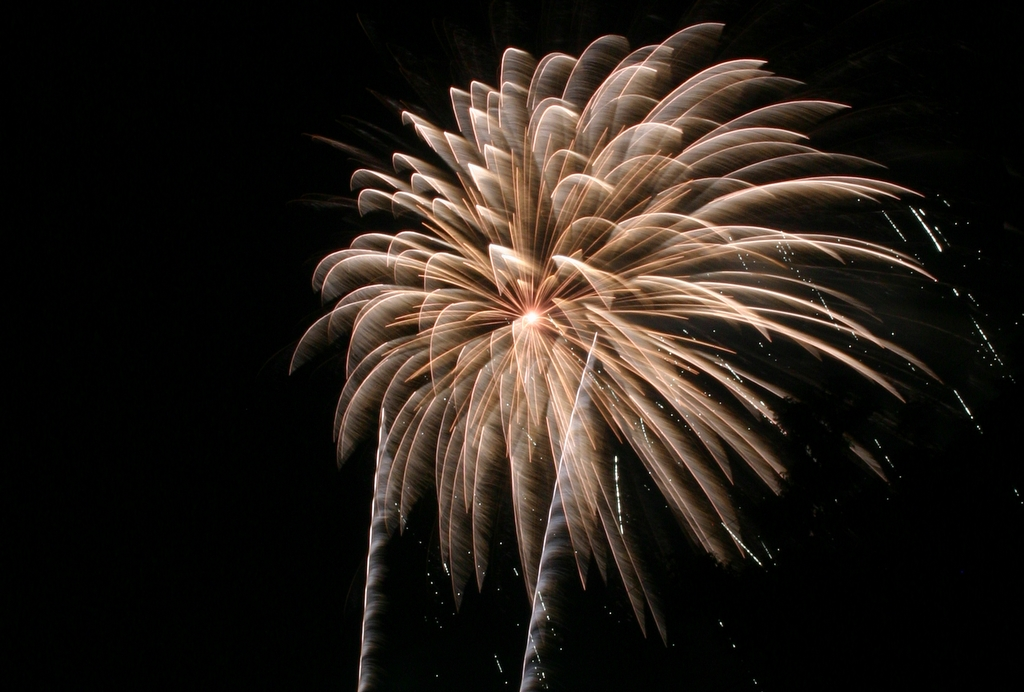
Fireworks

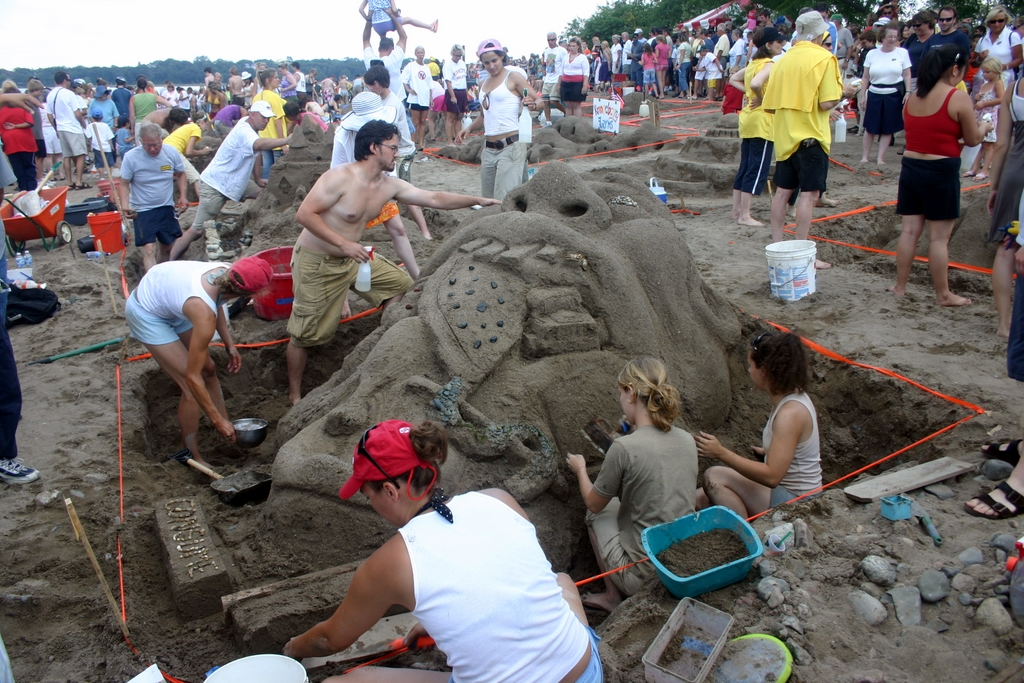
Xcel Energy Sandcastle Competition, Bde Maka Ska

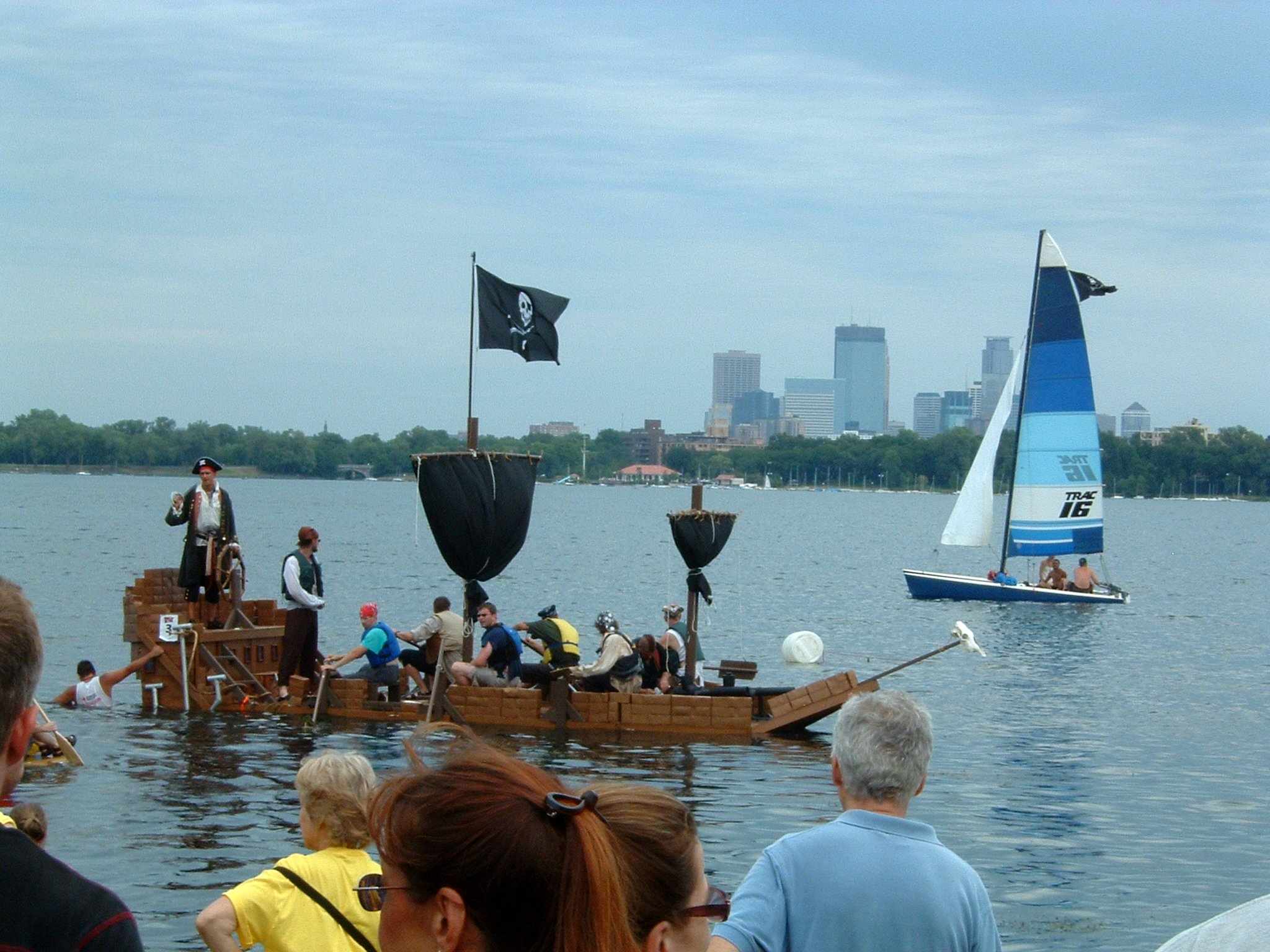
Kemps Milk Carton Boat Race, Bde Maka Ska

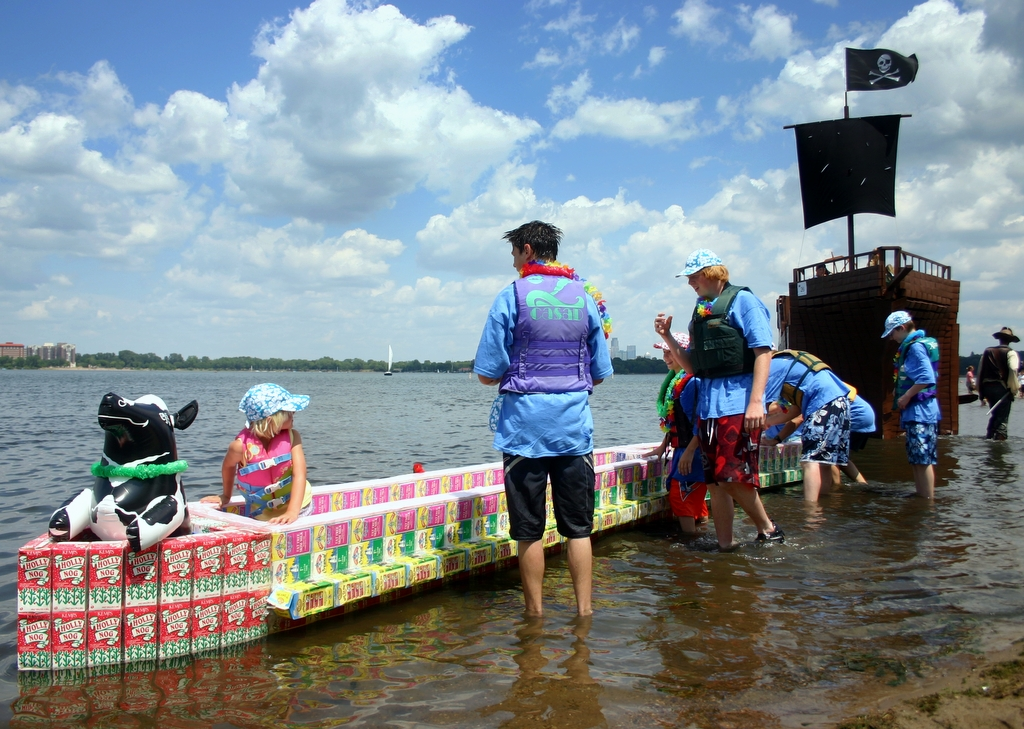
Kemps Milk Carton Boat Race, Bde Maka Ska
