= Ragamala Dance Company =

Independent dance company based in Minneapolis, Minnesota, United States

Ragamala Dance Company is an independent dance company based in Minneapolis, Minnesota, United States, at the Center for Performing Arts. It was founded in 1992 by Ranee Ramaswamy and David Whetstone. Ragamala collaborates with national and international artists of various disciplines. They perform locally in Minneapolis and on national tours around the United States, India, Europe, and other locations. Ragamala combines the extensive culture of India with the explorative, creative ethic of the United States.

== History ==
Ranee Ramaswamy was born in Chennai, Tamil Nadu, India, and was raised in the Hindu tradition there. Bharatanatyam is a classical dance form that Hindus believe was given to them by the gods and has been around for 2,000 years. “Bharatanatyam is a stylized dance language,” Ranee stated, “with 28 single-handed and 24 double-handed gestures.” Ragamala combines the ancient dance form of Bharatanatyam with contemporary aesthetics via collaboration. Ranee Ramaswamy trained in the technique's of Bharatanatyam in her home city of Chennai from the ages of 7 to 17. As a young adult, she was able to further her practice within the teachings of Alarmél Valli, which emphasizes rhythm and expression.

Ragamala's first production was at Great American History Theater with sitarist-composer David Whetstone in January 1994. The performance was structured around stated lines of poetry, and drumming of the tabla, to which Ranee Ramaswamy, Aparana Ramaswamy, and the other dancers performed "ragas" or units of movement related to those lines of poetry. Whetstone read the poetry and explained the dance in that initial performance. Ranee Ramaswamy translated the pure Bharatanatyam dance into something western audiences could more easily appreciate by collaborating with other artists and other art forms, deftly sifting experimental approaches into that ancient dance discipline.

The company assembles funding for specific collaborative works from a variety of sources, including commissions and grants with collaborative partners such as Walker Art Center, Theater Mu, the Miami University Performing Arts Series, Arts Midwest, National Endowment for the Arts, McKnight Foundation, Bush Foundation, General Mills Foundation, Land O'Lakes Foundation, and others.

In 2011, Ragamala's participation in the Maximum India Festival at the Kennedy Center in Washington, D.C., was well-received. Accompanied by mridangam and nattuvangam, and violin, they performed "Yathra" ("Journey") and "Gangashtakam" concerning the flow and worship of the river Ganga.

== Works ==
Ranee Ramaswamy and her older daughter, Aparna Ramaswamy, are co-artistic directors and principal dancers of the company. The choreography of Ragamala is rooted in the south Indian classical dance style of Bharatanatyam. Ragamala's works include intercultural, collaborative pieces that incorporate other dance forms, including sign language, jazz, Taiko, and poetry. Ashwini Ramaswamy, Ranee's younger daughter, is a choreographic associate and Director of Communications. Other company members include Tamara Nadel, Dancer; Jessica Fiala, Dancer; Sri Guntipally, Apprentice; and Chaitra Chandrashekar, Apprentice.

Sacred Earth, presented in India while on tour, explored the relationship between nature and humans and incorporated the philosophy and art of Kolam chalk drawings on stage. Sangam literature was also incorporated, including excerpts from Kuṟuntokai.

Fires of Varanasi explores the crucial place occupied by the sacred rituals around the city of Varanasi (also known as Benaras) in Uttar Pradesh, India, the river Ganges, and reincarnation.

Written in Water was created from Paramapadam, the original game that 'Snakes and Ladders' is based on. Interwoven with that is a 12th-century Sufi poem about enlightenment called The Conference of the Birds, which describes seven transitional states of being. Paramapadam means "ultimate feat" and can be understood as the ultimate place people want to go. The game involves mythological stories around the intention, action, and desire for ascension.

Body, the Shrine was choreographed by Renee, Aparna, and Ashwini, in conjunction with Alarmel Valli. It incorporates aspects of Bhakti, a Sanskrit term meaning both 'devotion' and 'participation.' (Note: The program included this quote: "If you dance and sign, then it is indeed Heaven," by Maharaja Swathi Thirunal, 19th century king and composer.) It also revisited the Bhakti movement, which dates back to the 6th century in India.

== Pandemic impact ==
In March 2020, Ragamala was working on Fires of Varanasi and had just brought in classical musicians from India. Due to the lockdown, the musicians from India had to return, and in-person work was halted. The company managed the lockdown period by focusing inward and using the time for creative production.

Fires of Varanasi was finally performed at the Kennedy Center in September 2021 and in Minneapolis starting in 2022. Fires of Varanasi includes 11 dancers – more than ever before. Seven are company dancers (increased from five), and two of the remaining four are men. Fires of Varanasi explores the specific rituals and traditions of Hindi beliefs, including an eternally recurring cycle of life to death back to life again. Aparna Ramaswamy explains, “… these are our stories and, hopefully, our stories are a way for everyone to think about their own stories and their own families and where they come from.”
