= Sandbox Theatre =

Sandbox Theater is an experimental theater company based in Minneapolis, Minnesota, United States.

Ryan Hill, Lisa Moreira, Andrew Lawrence Schiff and Heather Stone formed Sandbox Theater in 2005 after working together at 15 Head Theatre Lab. Hill served as Artistic Director until 2013, when he was replaced by ensemble member Derek Lee Miller. In 2017, company member Peter Heeringa became Artistic Director.

== Ensemble Members ==
- Evelyn Digirolamo 2013
- Heather Stone 2004
- Jaya Robillard 2017
- Kristina Fjellman 2012
- Matthew Glover 2010
- Megan Campbell Lagas 2012
- Peter Heeringa 2010
- Ryan Hill 2004
- Theo Langason 2013
- Tim Donahue 2010-2017
- Derek Lee Miller 2008-2017
- Nicole Devereaux 2010-2013
- Lisa Moreira 2004-2012
- Andrew Lawrence Schiff 2004-2013
- Wade A. Vaughn 2010-2012
- Jenna Wyse 2010-2012

== Shows ==
- 2005: Victoria in Red
- 2005: aphasiatica: duet
- 2006: aphasiatica: solo
- 2006: Koogoomanooki
- 2006: Zelda: Wonderland
- 2007: What Remains
- 2007: War With The Newts
- 2008: The Horse, The Bird, The Monkey & The Dancer
- 2009: June of Arc
- 2009: .faust
- 2010: June of Arc remount @ Singled Out: a Festival of Emerging Artists at the Guthrie Theater
- 2010: Unspeakable Things
- 2011: Sandbox Theatre's Fargo
- 2011: The Mad Trapper of Rat River
- 2012: The Oresteia Project: Queens and Daughters with Hamline University Theater
- 2012: Beatnik Giselle
- 2013: This Is A World to Live In
- 2014: Marie-Jeanne Valet, Who Defeated La Bete du Gevaudan
- 2014: Killer Inside
- 2015: War with the Newts
- 2015: Little Pilot
- 2015: June of Arc the Film
- 2016: Queens
- 2016: The Siege (San Francisco, CA)
- 2016: 600 Years
- 2017: Big Money
- 2017: In the Treetops
- 2018: Houdini
- 2018: Words.Do.Move
