= Joking Apart Theater =

Joking Apart Theater is a small theater company based in Minneapolis, Minnesota. The name of the company is taken from the title of the play, Joking Apart by British playwright Alan Ayckbourn. While Joking Apart has performed several of Ayckbourne's plays, the company is not solely dedicated to producing his works; rather it is dedicated to capturing the comic spirit of Ayckborn. The company's first production, That's MISTER Benchley to You, Mrs. Parker, was written by company founder Edwin Strout and was voted the best show of the 2003 Minnesota Fringe Festival.

The co-creator of this theater was George Bojerud.

== Company Members ==
Edwin Strout -Artistic Director

== Shows ==
- 2003: That's MISTER Benchley To You, Mrs. Parker
- 2004: Absent Friends; The Norman Conquests (review 1; review 2); Joking Apart
- 2005: That's MISTER Benchley To You, Mrs. Parker (review)
- 2006: Closer (review); Woman in Mind (December Bee); That's MISTER Benchley To You, Mrs. Parker
- 2007: Communicating Doors
