= Walking Shadow Theatre Company =

Walking Shadow Theatre Company is a Minneapolis-based professional non-profit theatre company which was founded in 2004 by John Heimbuch, Amy Rummenie and David Pisa with the following aims: to develop the talents of its artists, to nurture audience commitment to the arts, to facilitate dialogue within the community and to examine local culture in a global context. The company's name comes from Act V, Scene V of William Shakespeare's Macbeth. Heimbuch currently serves as the company's Artistic Director; Pisa currently serves as the company's Executive Director.

== Production history ==
2022: Cabal
2021: The Legend of Sleepy Hollow [digital production]; 21 Extremely Bad Breakups [digital production]; Gilgamesh [digital production]; Week of Sharks [digital production of short plays]; Gilgamesh and Beowulf in the park; REBOOT: An Online Play with Puzzles'
2020: The Ugly One (Original Title: Der Häßliche); Beowulf [digital production]; Hatchet Lady [digital production]; The Odyssey [digital production]
2019: Cabal; Open'
2018: 21 Extremely Bad Breakups; Equivocation'
2017: Marie Antoinette; Red Velvet; Hatchet Lady: Carry Nation, Angel of Destruction'
2016: The Aliens; Lasso of Truth [co-production with Workhaus Collective]; The Christians; The River
2015: The Coward; The 3rd Annual One-Minute Play Festival; A Midwinter Night's Revel
2014: The 2nd Annual One-Minute Play Festival; Schiller's Mary Stuart; The Odyssey; The Three Musketeers; Gabriel; The Whale
2013: The Legend of Sleepy Hollow; Gross Indecency: The Three Trials of Oscar Wilde; The Sexual Life of Savages
2012: reasons to be pretty; An Ideal Husband; Compleat Female Stage Beauty; Eurydice
2011: Drakul; after the quake; Saboteur
2010: Mojo; The Transdimensional Couriers Union; See You Next Tuesday; The Crowd You're In With
2009: Caligula; Robots vs. Fake Robots; SQUAWK; Some Girl(s)
2008: 36 Views; The American Pilot; William Shakespeare's Land of the Dead; Amazons and Their Men
2007: The Cryptogram; Fat Pig; Mr. Marmalade
2006: 1926 Pleasant; Seventy Scenes of Halloween
2005: 10-Speed Revolution
2004: The Lives of the Most Notorious Highwaymen
