= Workhouse Theatre Company =

Workhouse Theatre Company (WTC) is the only independent theatre company residing and producing in north Minneapolis. Based in the Camden neighborhoods of Minneapolis, WTC was established by Artistic Director Jeff Redman in 2004, under the name Camden Civic Theatre. The name was changed to Workhouse Theatre Company in 2006, although the theatre's dedication to Camden remains the same and WTC still maintains the title of the first and only independent theatre company based in the Camden community.

Workhouse Theatre Company is a teaching theatre whose mission is to provide the residents of the Camden neighborhoods with an opportunity to attend and to participate in quality presentations of theatrical works. In addition to offering an assortment of inexpensive classes in acting and improvisation, WTC offers a full theatrical season and regularly participates in community events such as Mississippi Heritage Day and Holiday on 44th. Since 2006, most WTC productions have been staged at The Warren: An Artist Habitat on 44th and Osseo Road North.

== Company history ==
- October 2003: The idea for a permanent independent theatre company in the Camden community was developed and then presented at a monthly Victory Neighborhood Association meeting.
- October 2004: After a year of planning and structuring, founder Jeff Redman teaches the first series of beginning theatre classes offered by Camden Civic Theatre through the format of the Minneapolis Public Schools Community Education classes held at Camden High School.
- March 2006: Camden Civic Theatre becomes officially incorporated with the State of Minnesota.
- August 2006: The company changes its name from the Camden Civic Theatre to the Workhouse Theatre Company.

=== Production history ===
- December 2004: A Snowbound Christmas Carol (company developed)
- March 2005: An Evening's Diversion (company developed)
- May 2005: An Evening of Nightmares (company developed)
- September 2005: Heritage Day Monologues by Valerie Borey
- November 2006: The Lottery by Shirley Jackson
- June 2006: The Good Doctor by Neil Simon
- September 2006
  - The Guys by Anne Nelson
  - Mississippi Running by Valerie Borey
- October 2006: 'night Mother by Marsha Norman
- November 2006:Prometheus Bound by Aeschylus
- December 2006: Scenes from A Christmas Carol by Charles Dickens, adaptation by Valerie Borey
- January 2007: House by Daniel MacIvor
- February 2007: Love Letters by A.R. Gurney
- March 2007: No Exit by Jean Paul Sartre
- June 2007: A Company of Wayward Saints by George Herman
