= Starting Gate Productions =

Theater company in Minnesota, United States

Starting Gate Productions is a small professional theater company based in Saint Paul, Minnesota. Starting Gate performs mainly contemporary classic plays, mostly by American authors, though they make occasional forays into classical texts. The company emphasizes its production values—which tend to be very high compared to other small theater companies in the Twin Cities--and its development of actors through workshops. Starting Gate produced a large number of shows in its first few season and gained early success with critics and audiences. Recently, the producers in the company turned their attention to securing Equity actors for some of their productions.

Starting Gate opened its debut season in 2002 at the Loading Dock Theater as one of the few theater companies based in downtown St. Paul. The company performed there until 2005, when it transferred to the newly renovated Mounds Theatre in St. Paul's Dayton's Bluff Neighborhood.

== Company members ==
Don Eitel (founding member) Richard Jackson (founding member) Stephen Frethem (founding member) Ben Chadwick (founding member) John Raabe (founding member)

David Coral Mark Webb Ben Tallen

== Awards ==
2004 Best Twin Cities Theaters -Minneapolis/St. Paul Magazine

== Shows ==
2002-2003: A Lie of the Mind; Play It Again, Sam; Death of a Salesman; Jeffrey
2003-2004: This is Our Youth (review 1; review 2); Period of Adjustment; Little Murders (review); Come Back to the Five and Dime, Jimmy Dean, Jimmy Dean; The Grapes of Wrath
2004-2005: Akespeareshay; Equus (review); Inspecting Carol (review); Prelude to a Kiss (review); Richard III
2005-2006: Man Saved By Condiments (review); Godspell; A Raisin in the Sun; Butterflies are Free; The Boys in the Band(review)
2006-2007: A View From the Bridge; P.S. Your Cat Is Dead; Amadeus; True West; King Lear
2007-2008: The Little Foxes; Anton In Show Business; The Sign In Sidney Brustein's Window; The Hollow
