= The Ave =

Main commercial street in Seattle's University District

University Way NE
- "The Ave"
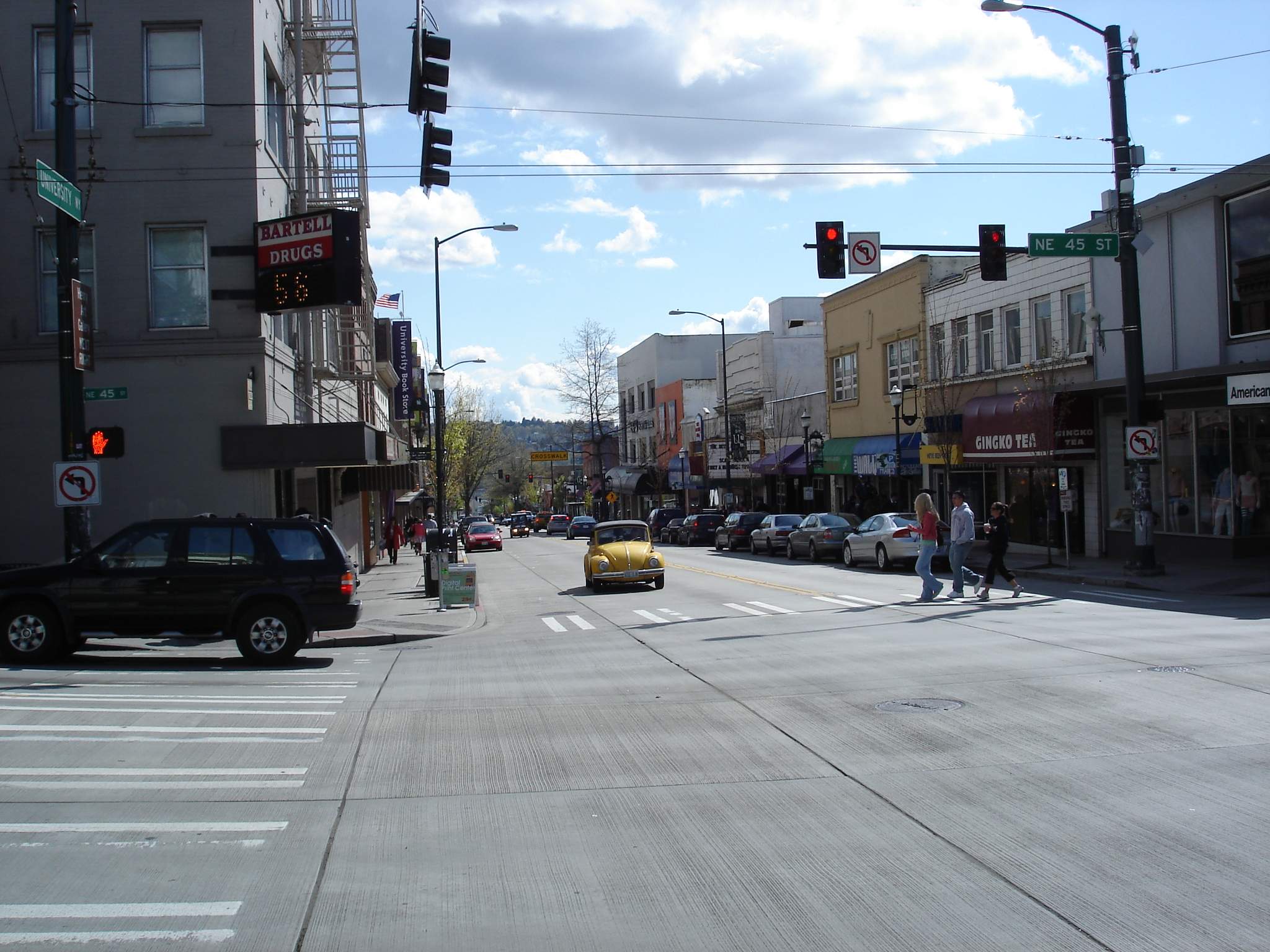
- University Way southbound from its intersection with NE 45th Street in 2006
- Interactive map of University Way NE
- Former names: Columbus Avenue; 14th Avenue NE (1891–1919)
- Maintained by: Seattle Department of Transportation
- Length: 1.2 mi (1.9 km)
- Location: Seattle, Washington
- Coordinates: 47°39′40″N 122°18′47″W
- South end: NE Pacific Street
- North end: NE Ravenna Boulevard

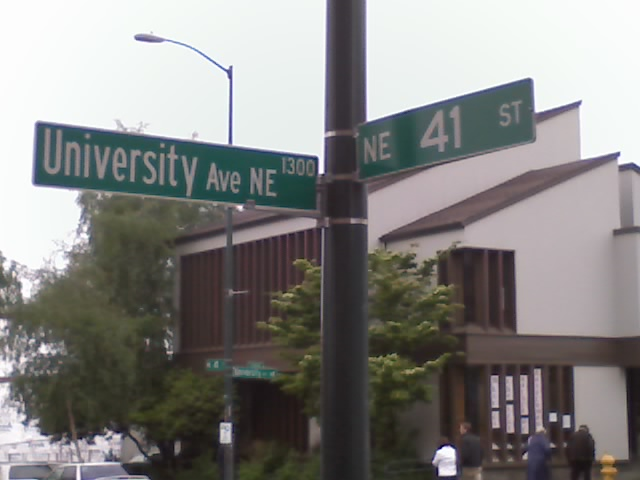
Erroneous signage for "University Avenue NE" at the intersection with NE 41st Street (2008)

University Way Northeast, colloquially The Ave (no period; pronounced /æv/), is a major street and commercial district in the University District of Seattle, Washington, located near the University of Washington (UW) campus. Once "a department store eight blocks long," The Ave has gradually turned into what now resembles an eight-block-long global food court. The story of The Ave reflects the dynamics of many urban neighborhoods and the social and economic problems of countless American cities, though it is also a crossroads of diverse subcultures. It is patronized by many of the nearly 96,900 students, faculty, and staff of the UW.

University Way NE is a collector (tertiary) arterial, running 1.2 miles (1.9 km) from just below NE Pacific Street in the south to NE Ravenna Boulevard and Cowen Park in the north, where it turns into Cowen Place NE. The street had been known as "The Ave" since the early 20th century and while it was no longer officially an avenue, the nickname stuck.

== History ==
Originally platted as Columbus Avenue, the street was renamed 14th Avenue after the neighborhood was annexed by the city in 1891. Locals came to feel that a numbered street name was inappropriate because of the thoroughfare's importance, so in 1919 the University Commercial Club held a contest that decided the new name of the street: "University Way." The street once carried streetcars operated by the Seattle Municipal Street Railway that ceased in 1941. Trolleybuses of the Seattle trolleybus system operated along University Way from 1940 to 1970.

== Vitality ==
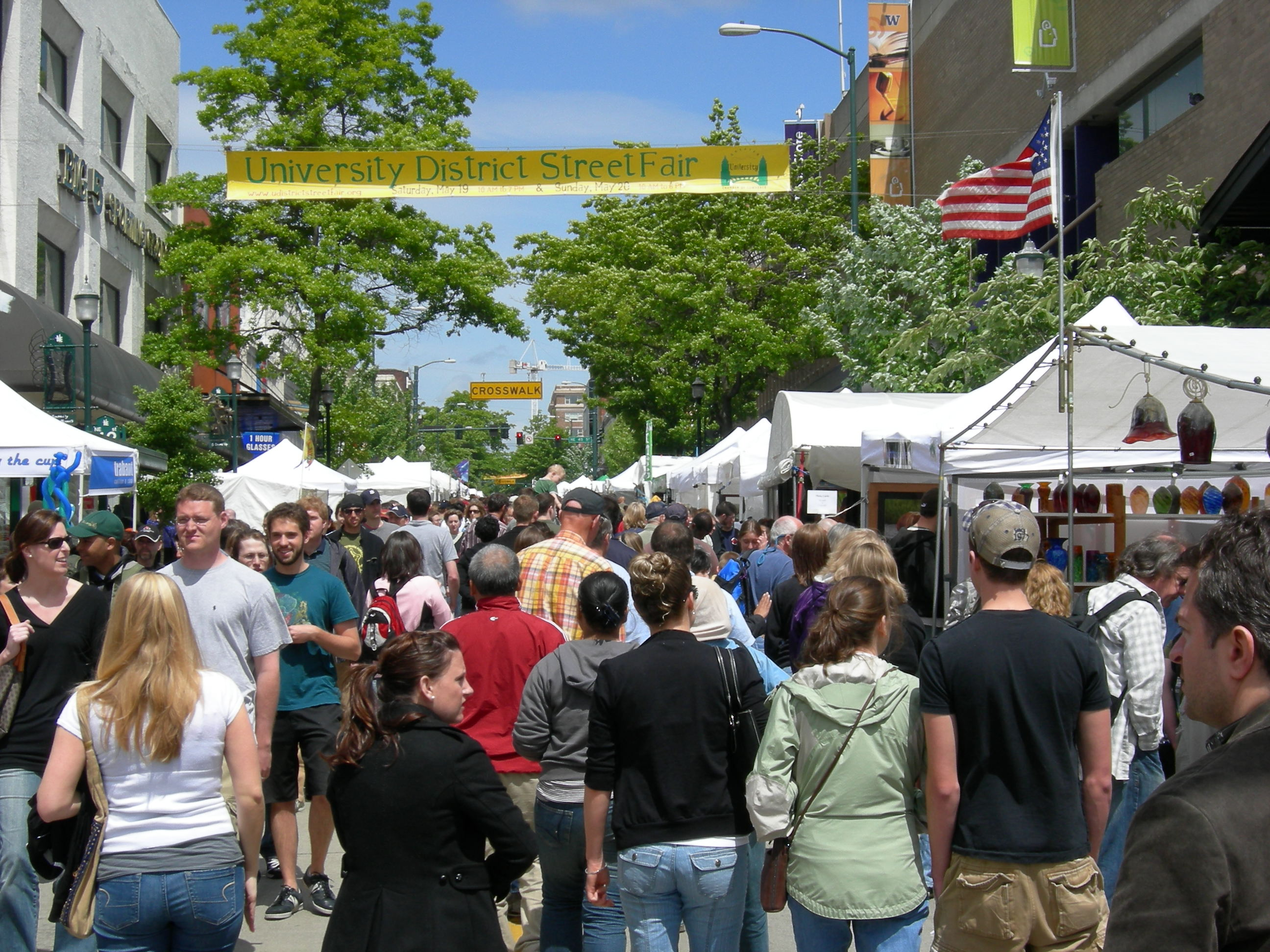
On the Ave during U. District Street Fair (2007)

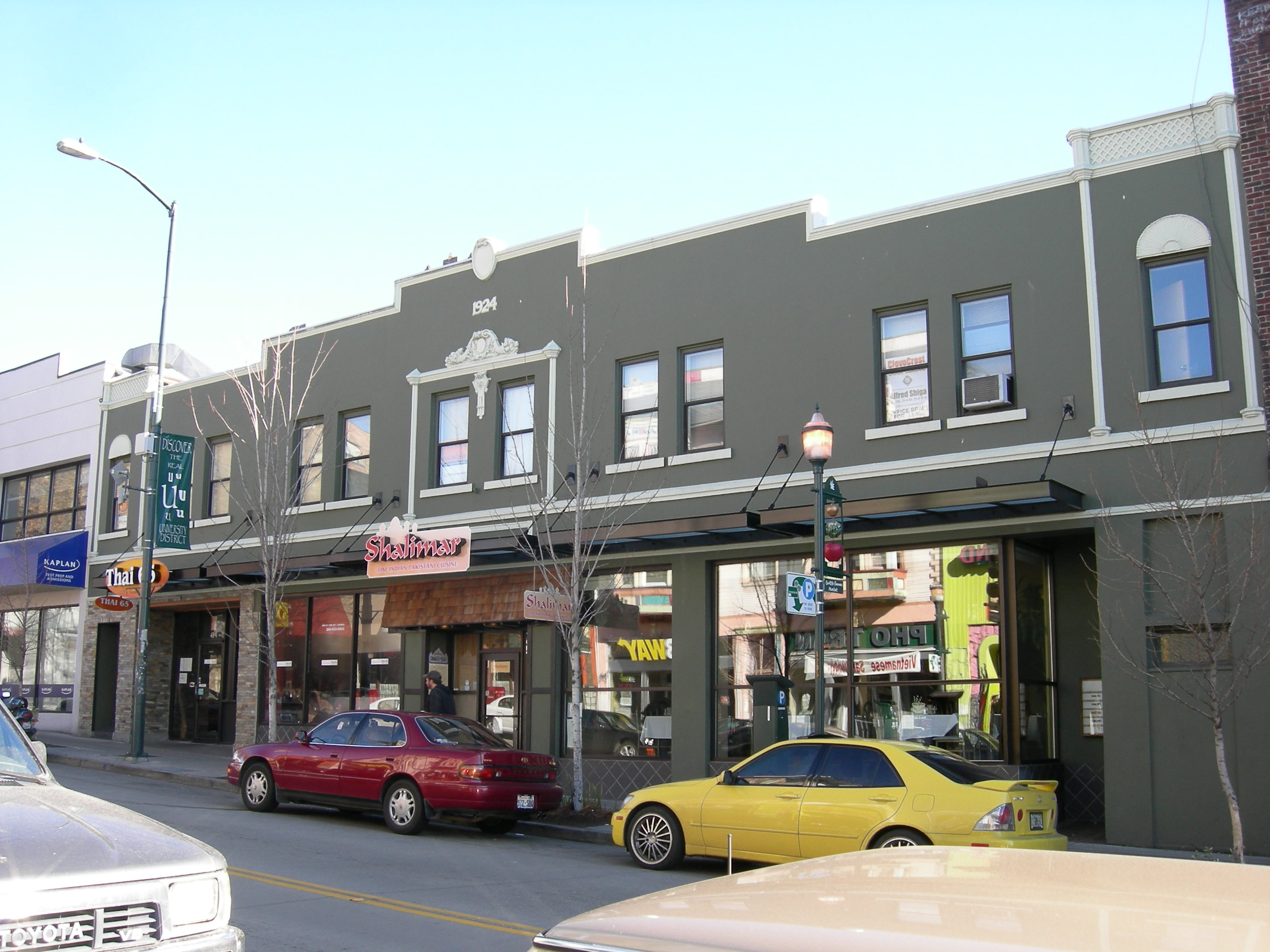
This building in the 4200 block was built in 1924 as a mortuary. It now contains restaurants and offices. (2008)

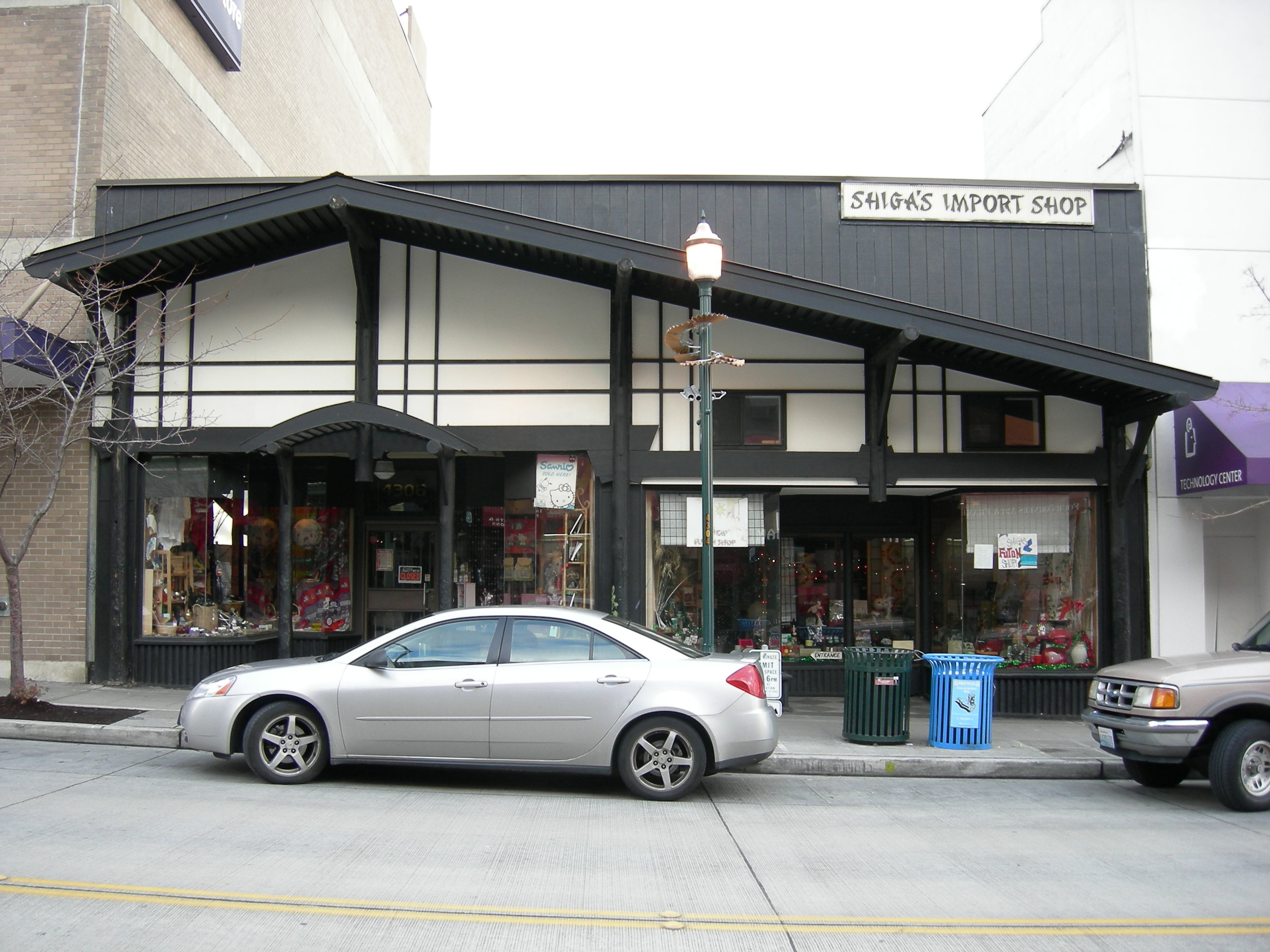
Shiga's Import Shop, one of the Ave's longest-lived retail stores. Andy Shiga was, for decades, a leader of the neighborhood's retail community. (2008)

Late in the 20th century the Ave declined significantly, due in significant part to the more competitive planning, capital investment, and popularity of University Village and Northgate Mall. From 2002 to 2004, the city and the neighborhood made some steps countering this trend by repaving the Ave and adding benches, bus bulbs, and period lighting. The Ave remains at the heart of campus life for university students, and is filled with busy restaurants (mostly inexpensive), new and used book and record stores, clothing stores, and movie theatres, most densely between NE 41st and NE 50th Streets. Among these are the Varsity Theatre (1940) and University Book Store (1924).

The Ave is glorified by the Seattle hip hop group Blue Scholars in their song "The Ave" on their self-titled album. "Fuck class, get your education on the Ave" is a repeated lyric, as they portray the Ave as the last true cultural melting pot of Seattle. The business communities "improvements" of 2002 are lamented ("whatever happened to the avenue before the summer of 2002"), as they feel the unique street society of students/poets/druggies was thrown away for a conformist corporate business façade. Blue Scholars also reference several businesses on The Ave, including University Book Store and the used record store 'Second Time Around,' now Al's Music, Video, and Games.

== Architecture ==
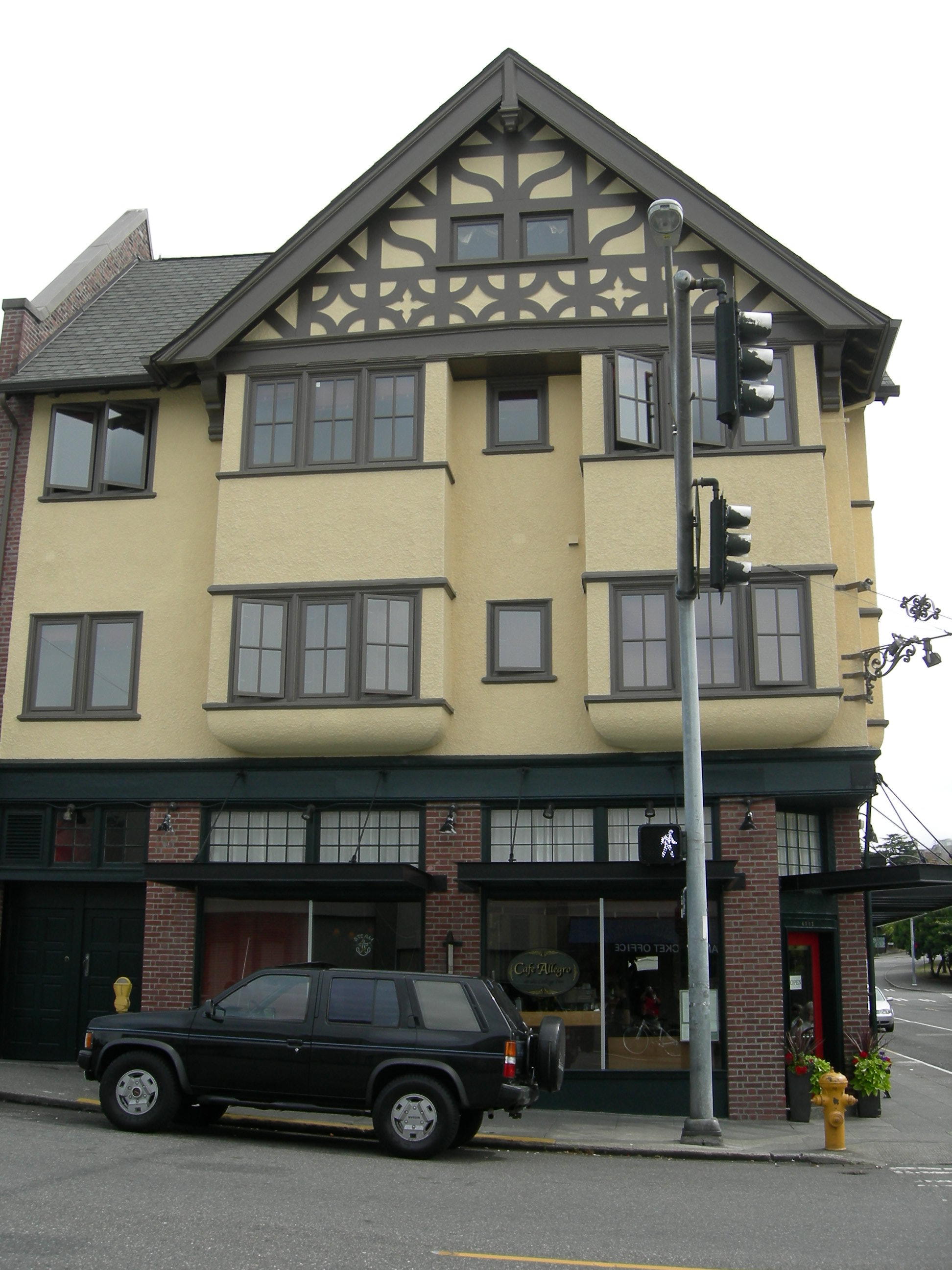
The College Inn (2007)

The College Inn, a Tudor Revival building at the northeast corner of NE 40th Street near the south end of The Ave, is listed on the National Register of Historic Places. The building was built in 1909 and added to the National Register in 1982.

The University Heights School building on the upper Ave opened in 1902. Originally there were several other buildings on the block (the west side of The Ave between NE 50th and NE 52nd Streets), but with successive expansions, the school became the only building on its block. It was briefly known as the Morse School in 1903; from 1974, Alternative Elementary School #2 used two-thirds of the building. Its exterior was declared a city landmark in 1977. It was closed as a school building in 1989, with the alternative school moving to the Decatur School. Since 1990 it has housed the University Heights Center.

The Department of Neighborhoods' inventory of historically important sites, which is not exhaustive (for example, it omits the University Heights School) lists 37 properties on University Way. Most of these are either apartment buildings or retail establishments, but the list also includes current and former theaters and the University District post office.

== See also ==
- Last Exit on Brooklyn
- Telegraph Avenue, University of California, Berkeley (UCB), Berkeley, California
- University Avenue, University of Minnesota, Minneapolis, Minnesota
- University District, University of Washington, Seattle
- Washington Square, New York University, New York

== Bibliography ==
- Binion, Andrew (June 6, 2002). "Crime, kids and customers". The Daily of the University of Washington.
- Borders, Tim (February 26, 2002). "Shady Business in the U-District". Right Turn. Associated Students of the University of Washington.
  Right Turn is "a student-run publication at the University of Washington that gives voice to conservative and libertarian views on campus." - "Right Turn".
- Deutsch, Joan, Local News Editor. (206)464-2214. Quote from The Seattle Times Style Rules, in-house publication. The Seattle Times since 1896 [Masthead, editorial page]. May cf. Karen Cater, News Editor, same phone.
- Dorpat, Paul (May 2002) [June 18, 2001]. "Seattle Neighborhoods: University District -- Thumbnail History". HistoryLink.org Essay 3380.
  Dorpat referenced Seattle: Now and Then Vols. 1, 2, and 3. Seattle: Tartu Publications, 1984, 1988;
  Walt Crowley and Paul Dorpat, "The Ave: Streetcars to Street Fairs", typescript dated 1995 in possession of Walt Crowley and Paul Dorpat, Seattle, Washington;
  Walt Crowley, Rites of Passage. Seattle: University of Washington Press, 1995;
  Cal McCune, From Romance to Riot: A Seattle Memoir. Seattle: Cal McCune, 1996;
  Roy Nielsen, UniverCity: The City Within City: The Story of the University District Seattle: University Lions Foundation, ca. 1986;
  Clark Humphrey, Loser: the Real Seattle Music Story. Portland, OR: Feral House, 1995.
- Kelton, Alana, News Editor. (206)448-8154. Quote from Seattle Post-Intelligencer In-House Style Guide intranet reference tool. Seattle P-I since 1863 [Masthead, editorial page].
- Kim, Gina (February 10, 2001). "Empty storefronts litter 'the Ave'". Business & Technology. The Daily of the University of Washington.
- Lehrke, Dylan Lee. "The Ave at the Crossroads: The decline of the Ave". The Daily of the University of Washington. pp. 2001–04–18.
- Marmor, Jon (December 1995). "Once Seattle's Second Main Street, the Ave. Has Fallen on Hard Times. Can the UW and Local Community Save What's Left?". "The Fall (and Rise?) of the 'Ave.'". Columns.
  Alumni magazine.
- Samson, Karl. "Big Time Brewery and Alehouse". Retrieved November 15, 2005, April 21, 2006. Links to "Seattle's Original Brewpub". Selection from Samson, Karl. Frommer's Seattle 2006 [Title incremented annually each January]. [City]: Wiley, 2006. ISBN 0-7645-9587-3
- "Street Classification Maps". Seattle Department of Transportation. 2005. Archived from the original on June 14, 2006.
  High-Resolution Version, PDF format, 16.1 MB
  Medium-Resolution Version, PDF format, 1.45 MB January 12, 2004.
  Low-Resolution Version, PDF format, 825 KB January 12, 2004.
  "Planned Arterials Map Legend Definitions", PDF format. January 12, 2004.
  The high resolution version is good for printing, 11 x 17. The low and medium resolution versions are good for quicker online viewing. [Source: "Street Classification Maps, Note on Accessing These PDF Files"]
- "Store History" (PDF). History & Highlights. Bookstore of the University of Washington. January 31, 2005. Archived from the original (PDF) on June 20, 2006.
- "VarsityTheatre". Landmark Theatres. n.d. Archived from the original on April 22, 2006.
