= History of Seattle (1940–present) =

== WWII and the Boeing era: 1945–1970 ==
From World War II until 1970, Seattle underwent what amounted to a long, sustained economic boom, although not without occasional reverses. Boeing was hiring, the economy was booming, and while there had been no successful regional planning, the city had not yet grown quite large enough.

The Boeing airplane company grew out of the fortune of William "Bill" Boeing's boat company and his fascination with airplanes and flying. In 1917, before American entry into World War I, Boeing employed only 28 people, but when the war orders started coming in, Boeing grew to "an enterprising firm with the one customer airplane builders had in those days, the federal government. Employing about four thousand people, with sales just under ten million dollars a year, it was a good if unspectacular business for Seattle." The company struggled through the period between the wars, and "began to build dressers, counters and furniture for a corset company and a confectioner's shop, as well as flat-bottomed boats called sea sleds." However, when World War II started, the government suddenly desired tens of thousands of planes a year, and Boeing was positioned to provide them. Working under fixed-fee contracts, Boeing churned out airplanes and became by far the largest employer in Seattle.

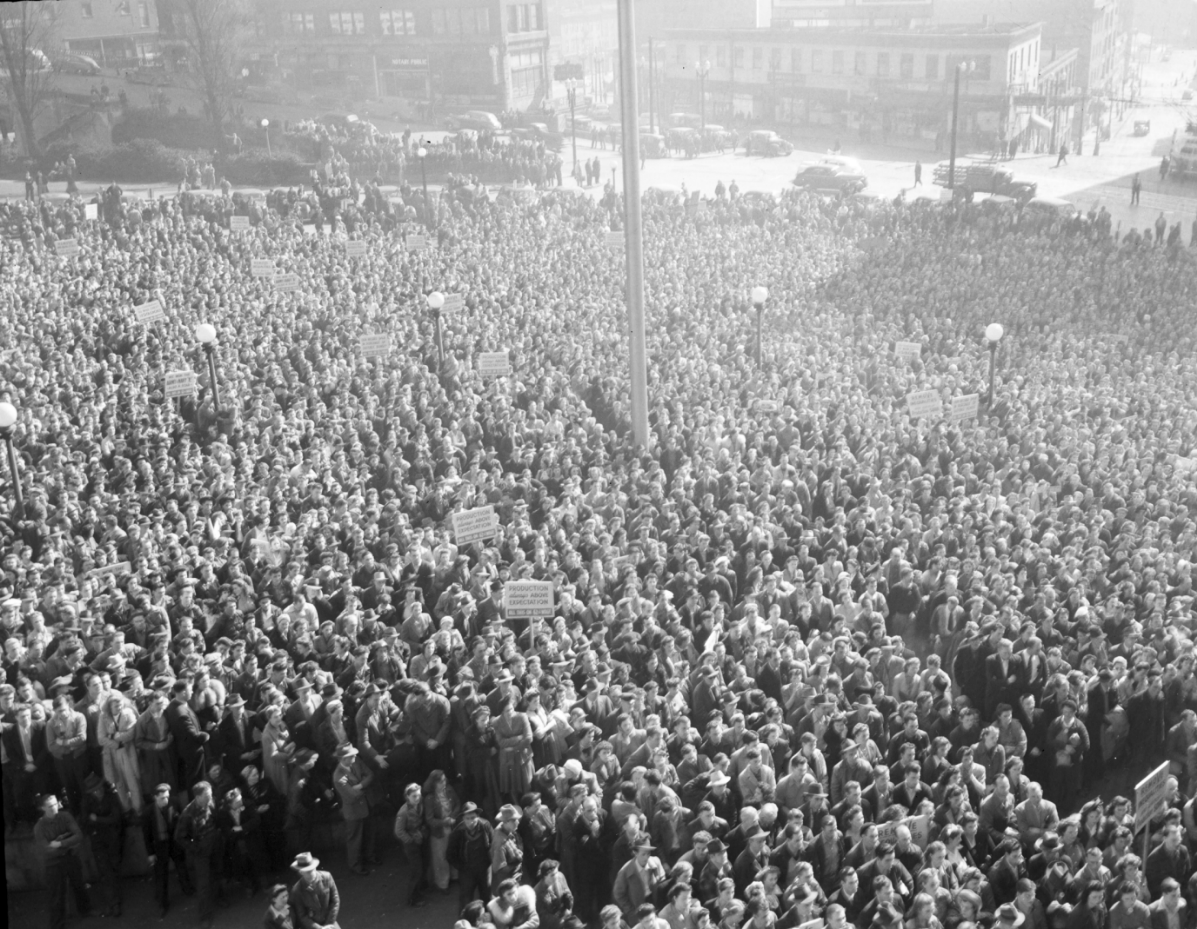
Boeing employees protest meeting in City Hall Park, 1943. Signs say "Production always above expectation".

However, Boeing spawned few local spin-off industries; only 5% of the subcontracted work was in the Puget Sound. Boeing was, by intention, a place where engineers designed the planes and line workers assembled parts that were imported from all over the world. Ostensibly, this would reduce the dependency of Seattle's economy on the fortunes of the airline business. The problem was that Seattle was still dependent on the airline business, without enjoying any of the spin-off industries that might have diversified the economy. When the war ended, "the military canceled its bomber orders; Boeing factories shut down and 70,000 people lost their jobs," and initially it appeared that Seattle had little to show for the wartime Boeing boom. While the war was on, almost all production went either towards Boeing factories or Boeing planes. After the war, the crash ensured that no one would have much money for new local development.

This period of stagnation soon ended with the rise of the jet airplane and Boeing's reincarnation as the world's leading producer of commercial passenger planes. With the Boeing 707-120, Seattle became Boeing's company town; "in 1947 Boeing employed about one out of every five of King County's manufacturing workers, in 1957 about every other one." As Boeing boomed, so did Seattle. From 1940 to 1950, the population increased 99,289 or 27% from 368,302 to 467,591. From 1950 to 1960, the population increased 89,496 or 20% to 557,087. All of those people had to live somewhere, and the Fifties saw a huge housing boom. Population density all over Seattle exploded as people filled the boundaries of settlement in the city and began to move north. Most of the development was in single-family houses, since land was plentiful.

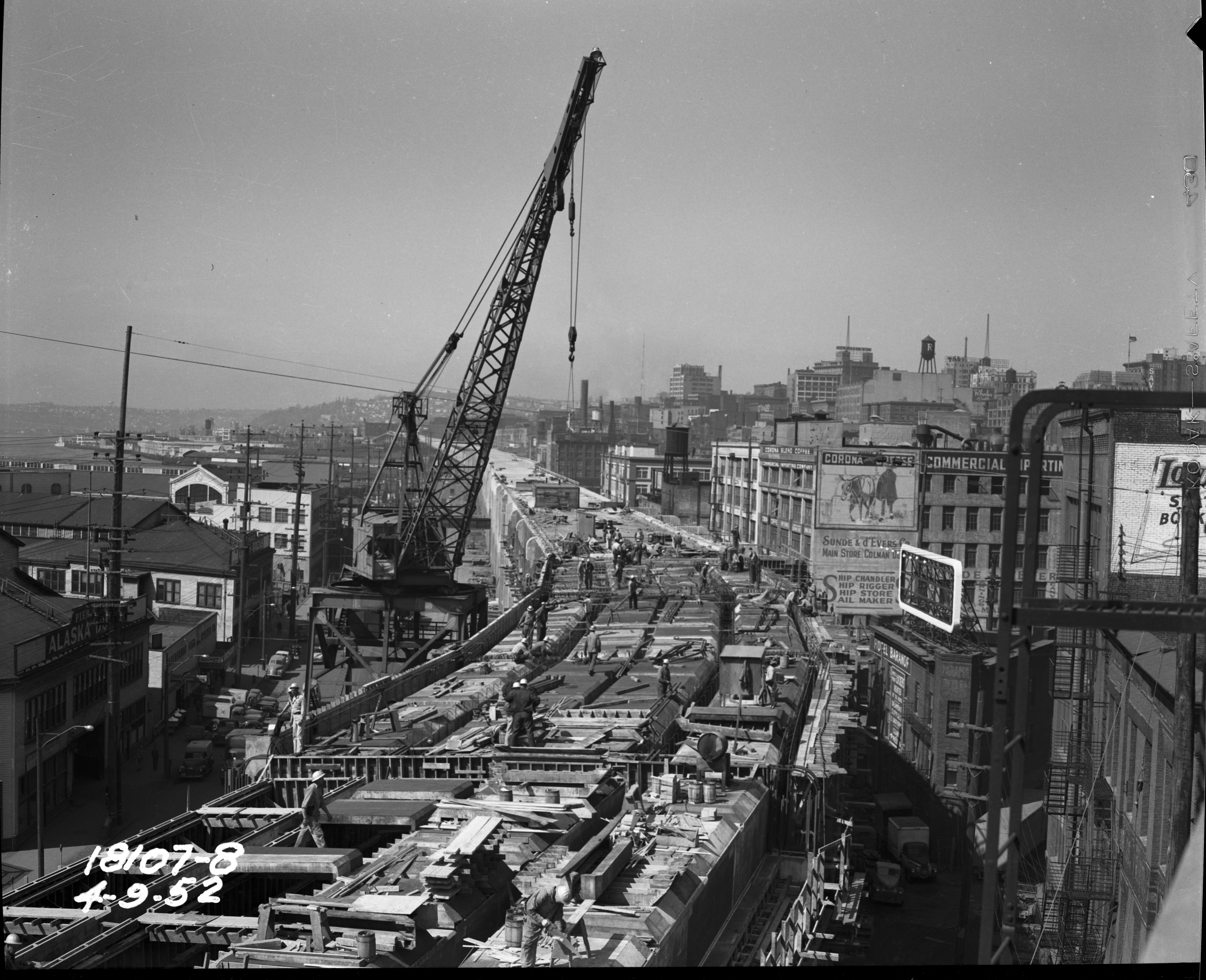
Constructing the Alaskan Way Viaduct, 1952

At the same time, the freeways were being built to compensate for all this new growth. The community of Mercer Island, the "Eastside" (east of Lake Washington) communities of Bryn Mawr, Newport, Bellevue, Clyde Hill, Hunts Point, Medina, Juanita, and the northern suburbs of Kenmore, Lake Forest Park, and Lake Hills all came into being during the Boeing boom. Interstate 5 (I-5) cut the city in half on a north–south axis, while I-90 crossed east–west, connecting with Mercer Island via the floating Lacey V. Murrow Memorial Bridge. SR 520 skirted the north end of Montlake just south of the Montlake Cut, and paralleled I-90 with its own floating bridge. I-5 neatly cut off Downtown Seattle from Capitol Hill, First Hill, and even from part of the historic downtown, including the Tony Sorrento Hotel, which was left stranded on the "wrong" side of the freeway. I-90 was perhaps less disruptive (unless, of course, you were living in its path), since it is partly routed through a tunnel and skirts a more-or-less unbuildable edge of Beacon Hill, avoiding slicing the city into north and south halves. Freeway Park was eventually built over I-5 in 1976, restoring something of a link between Downtown and First Hill, but was not heavily enough used to provide much mitigation. The R.H. Thompson Expressway, planned to connect SR 520 with I-90 and SR 167 via the Central District, and the Bay Freeway, connecting I-5 with the Seattle Center via Mercer Street, were canceled by citizen referendums as part of nationwide freeway revolts.

With all this postwar growth came growing pollution of the lakes and rivers that provided much of the beauty that had been Seattle's appeal to its recent immigrants. Also, the sprawl constantly demanded more roads, since the ones already built had terrible traffic. (Naturally, new roads simply led to new development and were soon as snarled as those they were intended to relieve.) A group of Seattle natives, anxious to preserve the city in which they grew up, came together to institute the Metropolitan Problems Committee, or METRO, intended to manage and plan the metropolitan area. The driving force behind this movement was Jim Ellis, who headed the committee and repeatedly brought the planning issue before the voters and city governments. The logic was that a regional transit system would require a regional political body; the same held for regional sewage and pollution control or regional growth planning. The original, comprehensive METRO regional plan was defeated in a vote by suburbanites who seemed to view the problem not as one of pollution, transit, sprawl, or lack of planning: in what some Seattleites referred to as the "Pave the Lake" strategy, they just wanted more bridges across Lake Washington.

METRO came back, scaled down to a sewage treatment and transport organization, and prevailed with an overwhelming majority in Seattle and a decent showing in the suburbs. METRO, despite repeated attempts by Jim Ellis, never did manage to get authority for planning, and to this day there is no single body responsible for planning the Seattle metropolitan area and its transportation systems. (METRO was eventually merged into the King County government.) Seattle and King County have, at times, seemed better at coming up with money for stadiums and other large public works than for broader projects.

During this period, Seattle's downtown was in decline (as were many other downtowns across the nation, for much the same reason): people shopped in the suburbs, not in the city. The market for goods in the city's center was drying up. Seattle's solution was to host the Century 21 Exposition, the 1962 World's Fair. The area directly north of downtown was slumping very badly—some of it to the point of being known as the "Warren Avenue slum"—and the city owned a lot of property almost adjacent to that "slum". The fair, given a futuristic science theme, was designed to leave behind a civic center, now known as Seattle Center, containing arts buildings, a food court, museums, and the like and serving also as a fairground. The United States Science Pavilion (now the Pacific Science Center) was one of the central attractions. Boeing performed one of its few altruistic public actions: they "created and installed in the United States Science Pavilion a space age Spacearium, a permanent addition to the center and one of the most attractive features of the fair."

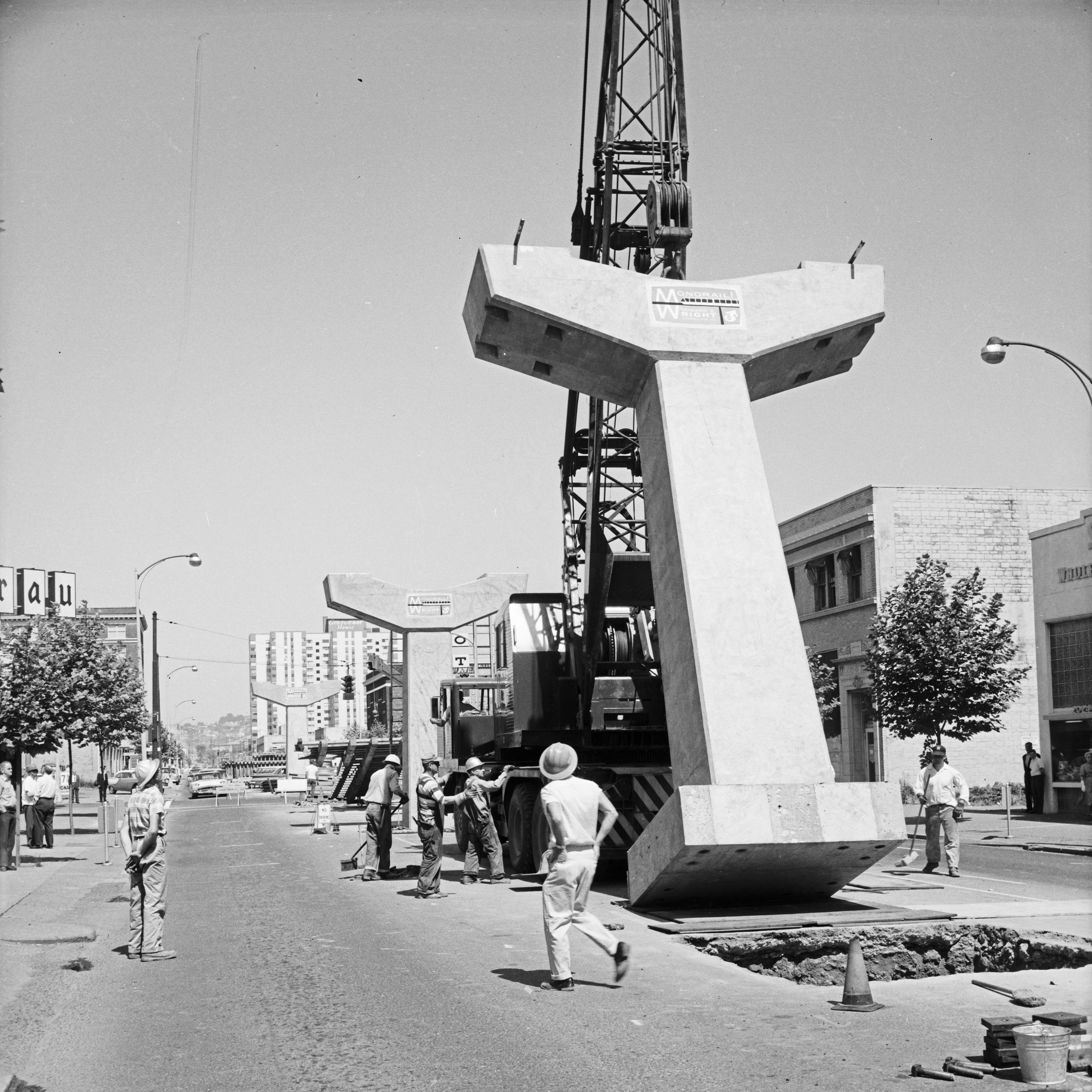
Building the Monorail, 1961.

In conjunction with the fair, a demonstration monorail line was constructed, running from the center of downtown to the fair, a distance of 0.9 miles; it was constructed at no cost to the city and was paid for out of ticket sales, and then turned over to the city for $600,000. (See Seattle Center Monorail). It is currently the only monorail in the United States to turn a profit. It is now almost exclusively a tourist attraction. The World's Fair granted Seattle the landmark Space Needle, also a continuing tourist attraction. Seattle acquired an Opera House, a Coliseum, and a refurbished Arena (all of which have since been replaced or significantly remodeled). Today, Seattle Center is host to the Bite of Seattle, Bumbershoot, a music and art festival that draws crowds in the hundreds of thousands every Labor Day Weekend, Northwest Folklife Festival on Memorial Day Weekend, a comparably large folk music and folk culture festival, and PrideFest, a finale of the much larger event Seattle Gay Pride Parade like many other cities every year in late June in honor of the 1969 Stonewall Riots flying the pride flag atop the Space Needle for the first time in 2010. The Pacific Science Center continues to draw crowds, along with a small amusement park that operates all summer – *Needs updating, amusement park removed years ago as part of the Experience Music Project (now Mo-Pop, Museum of Pop Culture) construction on the site. The World's Fair reenergized the downtown of Seattle, and was generally a smashing success, even finishing with a profit.

After the war, the University of Washington also took a step forward, finally fulfilling the promise of its name. Charles Odegaard, as president of the University, used his office to press for the creation of community colleges and other four-year colleges in Washington, so that the University of Washington could concentrate on research. By the time Odegaard retired, the UW was second only to MIT in the size of its federal grants, and the number of students attending had swelled. Because the University of Washington campus is open, its impact on the University District as well as the rest of the city was quite significant; "In remaining a largely commuter school, the university has diminished its ability to withdraw as a community in itself and has maintained thereby its ability to the larger and more amorphous community."

== Counterculture ==
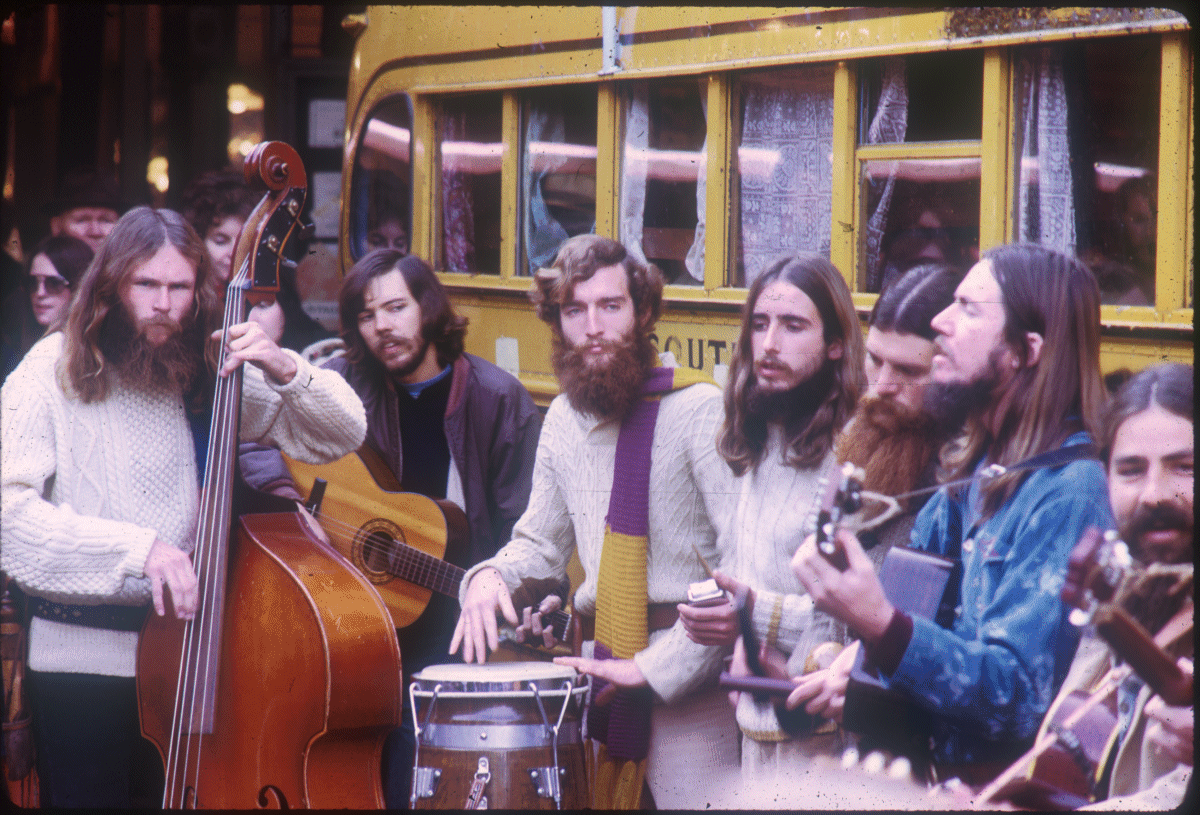
Members of the Love Family performing at Pike Place Market 65th anniversary celebration, 1972.

Starting in the late 1950s, Seattle was one of the centers of the emergence of the American counterculture and culture of protest. Before grunge there were beats, fringies (a local Seattle term), hippies, and batcavers. Opened in 1967, one counterculture haven in Seattle was the Last Exit on Brooklyn coffeehouse located near the University of Washington. At the University itself, Parrington Lawn became known as "Hippie Hill", due in part to UW President Charles Odegaard's "outstandingly tolerant attitude toward the hippie element on and near his jurisdiction's campus, as well as his ongoing refusal to allow Seattle city police onto UW property."

The Seattle counterculture played a role in early urban environmentalism. In the early 1970s, the Northwest Tilth Association promoted alternative modes of production and consumption of food, laying the foundation for an organic food economy in the Pacific Northwest region.

== Political emergence of non-white minorities ==
Despite Seattle being one of the "whitest" major cities in the United States, it has had an African-American mayor (Norm Rice), at least four African-American city council members, and at least half a dozen Asian-American city council members including Wing Luke, the first Asian American elected to public office in Washington (in 1962). It has also been the political base for figures such as former King County Executives Gary Locke—who went on to be the first Chinese-American governor of a U.S. state—and Ron Sims, an African American who went on to become the Deputy Secretary of the United States Department of Housing and Urban Development. After World War II, many African-Americans moved into the Central District. This neighborhood began to gentrify in the 1990s and today, the city's African American population is more focused on the South End of the city.

== Boeing bust: 1970–1985 ==
Due to changing external demand and the cancellation of the SST program, "the Boeing workforce was cut from 80,400 to 37,200 between early 1970 and October 1971". After 1973, Seattle was in good company for its recession, since the rest of the country was also experiencing the energy crisis. However, Seattle was hit harder than most cities due to its over-reliance on Boeing as an employer, and had the worst post-Depression unemployment for any major US city, nearly 12%. As with most periods of downturn, there was not much private investment or construction. However, despite the crushing unemployment and the infamous billboard saying "Will the last person leaving Seattle – Turn out the lights," the outflux of people was "never more than 15% of those laid off," and was promptly countered by new arrivals taking advantage of the now-underpriced housing stock.

Quite likely, Seattle evaded the fate of Detroit through being a port city with a large number of highly educated, skilled workers. Seattle industry did slightly better than the national average during the rest of the 1970s; nonetheless the boom decades of the 1950s and 1960s had been brought to a decisive end.

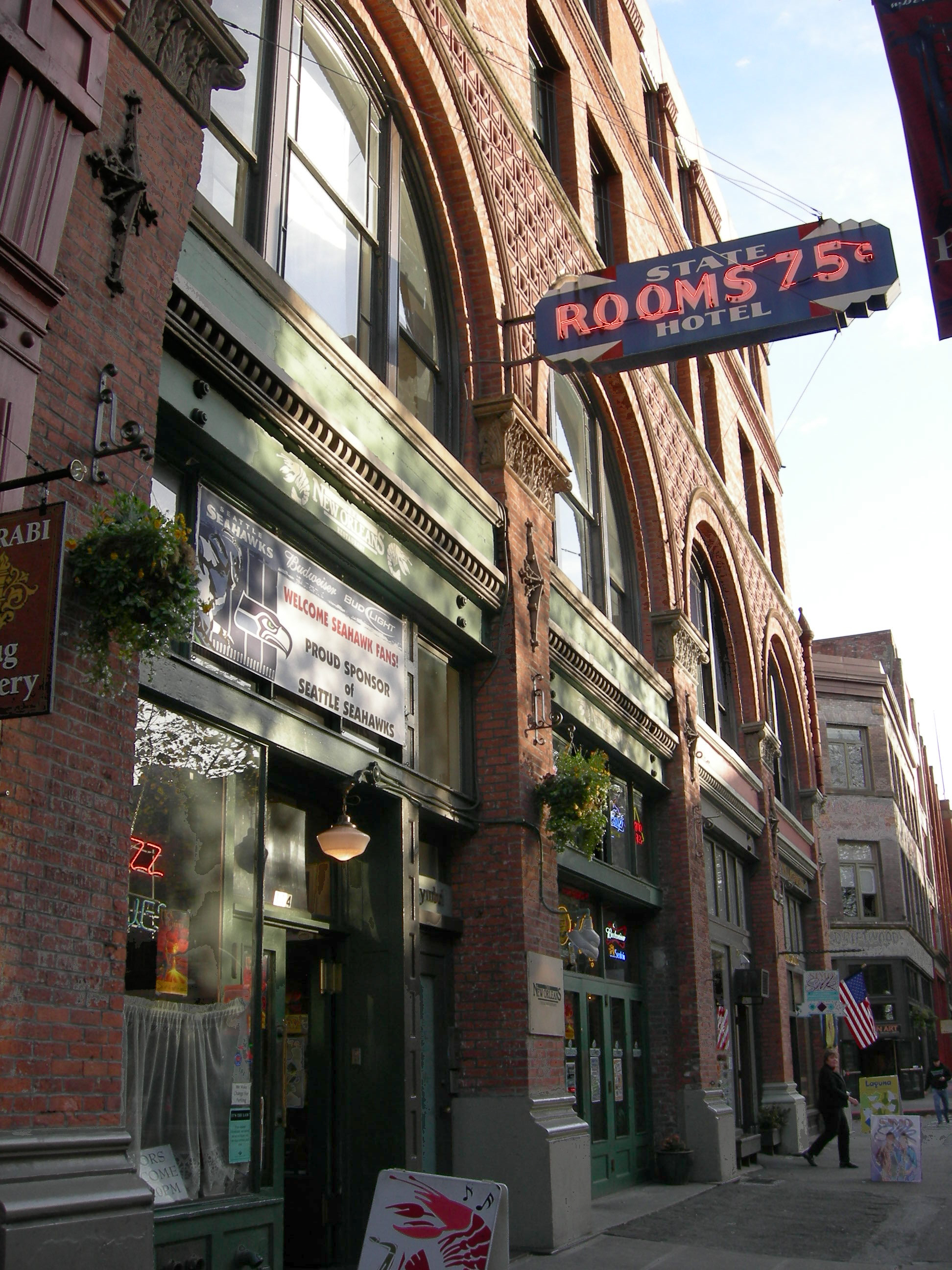
The State Hotel and Delmar Building, one of the many century-old buildings in Pioneer Square.

The Pike Place Market, arguably Seattle's most significant tourist attraction, gained its modern form in the aftermath of the Boeing crash. The market had been founded in 1907 with a great deal of early success, but, like most public markets in America, had suffered a decline as corporations took over food distribution. The deportation of the Japanese from Seattle during World War II hit the market particularly hard, since 80% of its "wet stall" vendors had been ethnically Japanese. The city council wanted to make a "Pike Place Plaza" by demolishing the mostly derelict market and replacing it with "a new hotel, a 32-story apartment building, four 28-story office buildings, a hockey arena, and a 4,000-car parking garage." A "Keep the Market" initiative, led by architect Victor Steinbrueck, was passed in 1971, pushing for adaptive reuse. A promotional committee was created, historical district status attained, and vendors were convinced to move in and sell wares. The project was wildly successful, and today the Pike Place Market pulls nine million visitors each year.

A similar story occurred with Pioneer Square. An old neighborhood, largely built after the Great Seattle Fire, it had fallen into derelict status after the war. However, with a reenergized downtown, businesses started to look for buildings that could be acquired cheaply. When offices moved into renovated buildings, suddenly there was a market for facilities to service them, leading to a "flood of other restaurants, galleries, boutiques." Seattle was definitely recovering from the blow dealt by the Boeing recession, refilling areas that had threatened to become slums.

== Silicon Forest: 1985–present ==
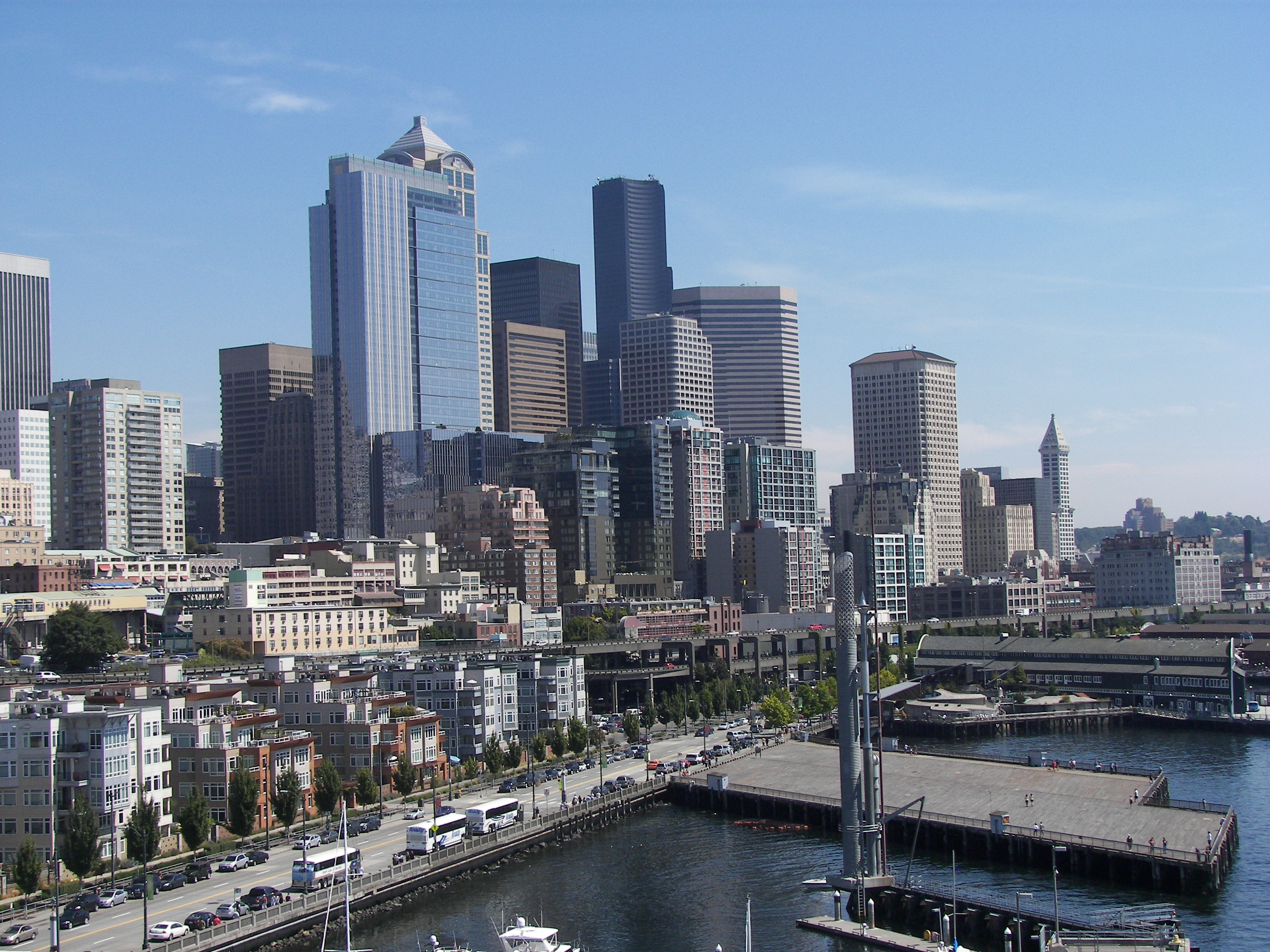
Downtown Seattle, 2009

Bill Gates and Paul Allen, founders of Microsoft Corporation, attended the Lakeside School, a private middle and high school in Haller Lake, at the northern Seattle city limits. This turned out to have rather dramatic consequences for the entire Seattle area. Microsoft's first product, Microsoft BASIC, came out in 1976. The company was incorporated in New Mexico the same year. By 1978 sales exceeded one million dollars a year. In 1979, Microsoft moved its offices back to Redmond from Albuquerque, New Mexico—they had gone to New Mexico to be near a client who no longer dominated their business, Gates and Allen wanted to go back where they were from, and it was easier to entice quality programmers to the Seattle area than the deserts of New Mexico. By 1985, sales were over $140 million, by 1990, $1.18 billion, and by 1995, Microsoft was the world's most profitable corporation, Allen and Gates were billionaires, and literally thousands of their past and present employees were millionaires. Microsoft had grown from a two-man operation to a company with 11,000 employees in 1992 and 48,030 (about half of them in the Seattle area) in 2001.

Microsoft spawned a host of other companies in the Seattle area: millionaire employees often left to found their own companies, and Allen, after his own departure from Microsoft, became a major investor in new companies. Seattle-area companies that owe their origins at least indirectly to Microsoft include RealNetworks, Attachmate, InfoSpace, and a host of others. Quite unlike Boeing, Microsoft has served as a catalyst for the creation of a whole realm of industry. Microsoft has also taken a much more active hand than Boeing in public works in the area, donating software to many schools (including the University of Washington).

During this era, Seattle has also experienced quite good growth in the biotechnology and coffee sectors, and Seattle-based Nordstrom became a national brand.

Paul Allen, whose fortune was made through Microsoft though he has long since ceased to be an active participant in the company, was a major force in Seattle politics. He attempted a voter initiative to build the Seattle Commons, a huge park in South Lake Union and the Cascade District, and even offered to put up his own money to endow a security force for the park, but it was defeated at the polls. He did get a football stadium for the Seattle Seahawks through a successful statewide ballot initiative, and founded the Experience Music Project (originally intended as a Jimi Hendrix museum) on the grounds of Seattle Center.

One other piece of urban design in this era is the Washington State Convention and Trade Center, completed in 1988 and expanded in 2003, which bridges the freeway and adjoins Freeway Park, connecting First Hill to downtown. Arguably, the convention center has helped fuel further downtown growth and has (at least to some extent) reconnected both sides of the freeway. Paralleling the Microsoft and Internet boom, Downtown Seattle underwent a revival; at the height of the boom, downtown office space was described as "Number four or five on the national hit parade [of real estate prices], and climbing." After an increase in vacancy to double-digit levels in the Internet Bust, occupancy began to return. The return of the downtown retail district appears to be a more lasting phenomenon, although at the expense of having a retail district dominated by national chain stores, many of them gathered in mall complexes. The growth of the tech industry such as Amazon and its expansion to the downtown area also resulted in a record level construction boom following the Great Recession, with a total of 68 major projects underway from Sodo to South Lake Union at the end of 2016, the most since 2005. Much of the development was residential which comprise up to 2/3 of all projects, most of which were centered at South Lake Union. As a result, twice as many apartments in Seattle opened in 2017 than any other year in the city's history. The pace of development is expected to increase slightly until 2019.

== N30 ==
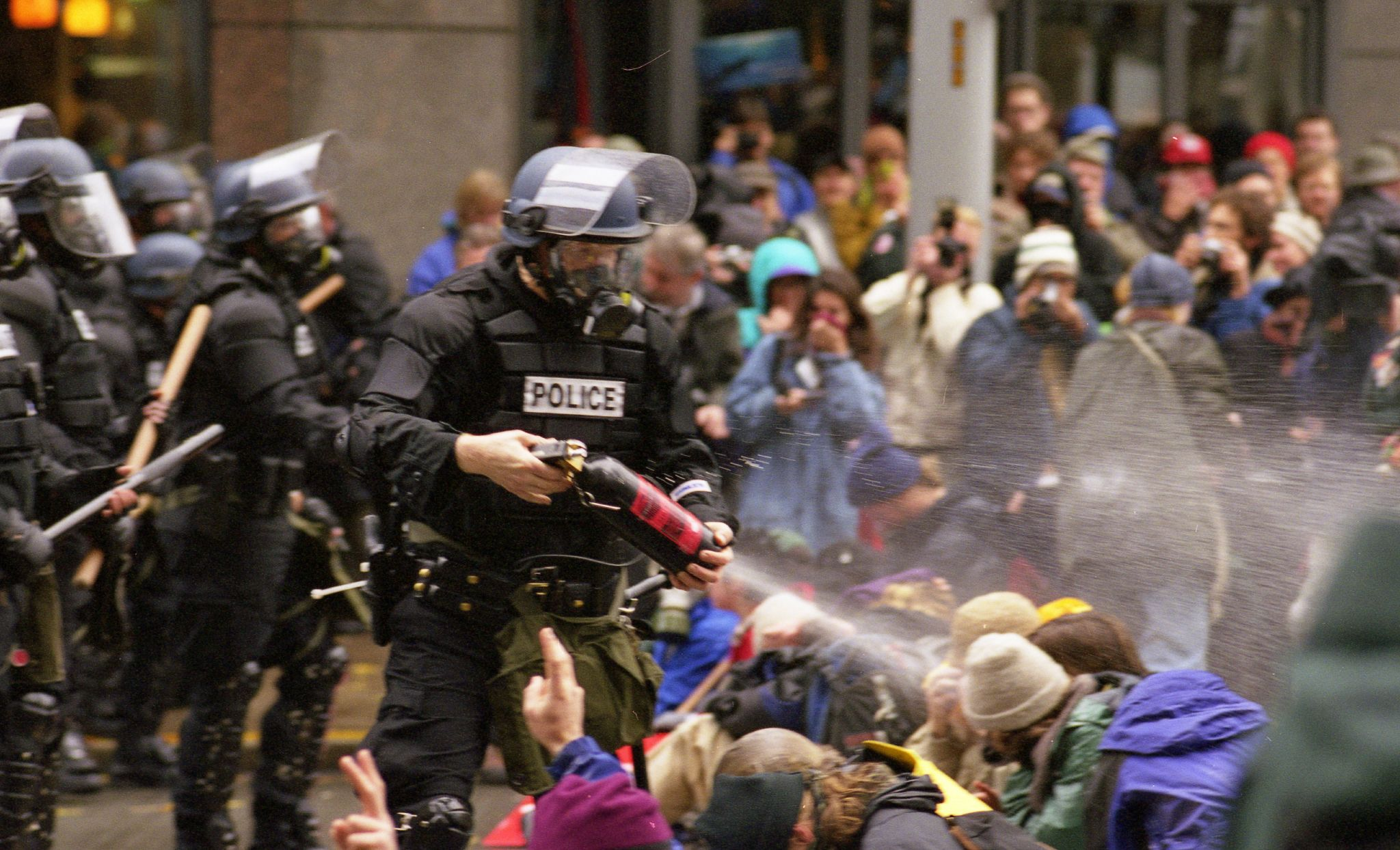
Police using pepper spray against WTO protestors.

Seattle's bid for the world stage by hosting the World Trade Organization Ministerial Conference of 1999 did not play out as planned. Instead, the city became the site of the first great street confrontation between the anti-globalization movement and the World Trade Organization on November 30, 1999. While many of those in the streets, and most of those in the suites, were from out of town or even out of country, much of the groundwork of Seattle hosting both the event and the protests against it can be attributed to local forces.

== Music ==
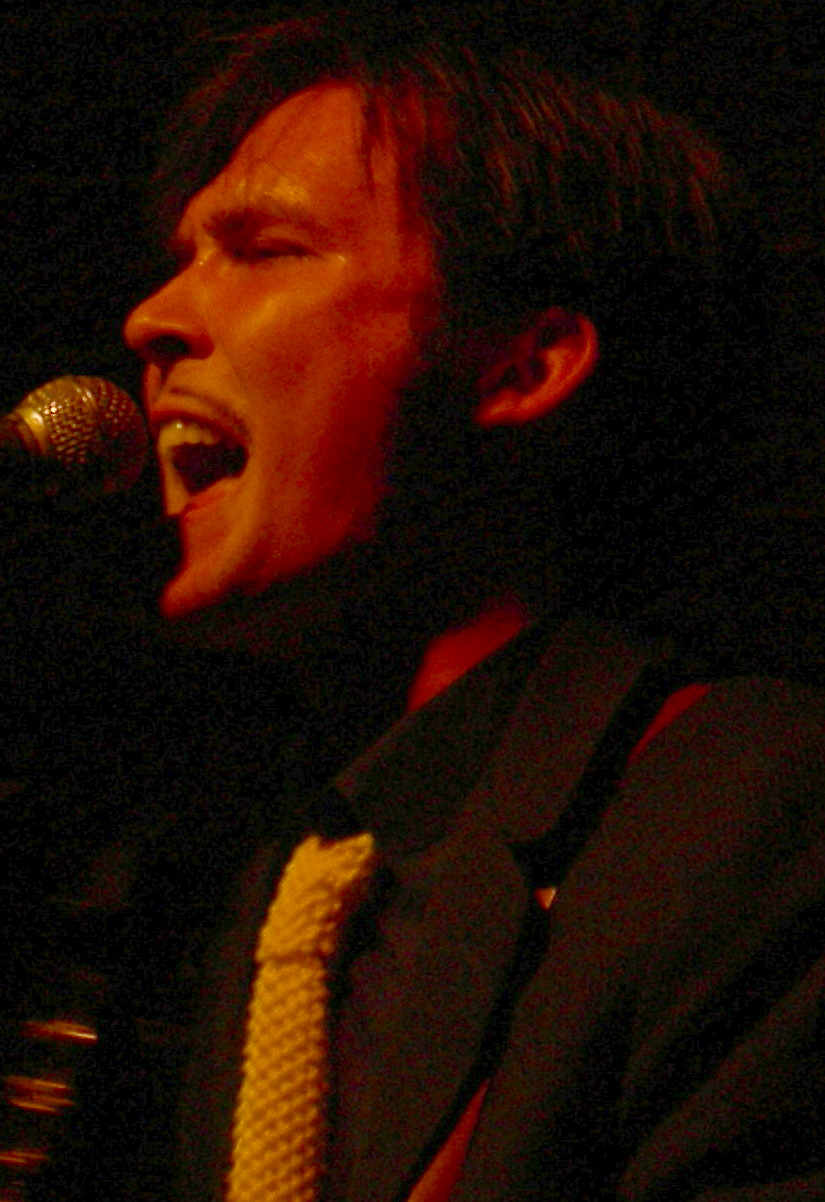
Singer, songwriter, and guitarist Shane Tutmarc carries on a family musical tradition: his great-grandfather Paul Tutmarc, also from Seattle, has been credited as the inventor of the electric bass.

Seattle has long had a rich musical heritage, as many of rock's top names since the '60s have hailed from the area. In the mid-20th century the thriving jazz scene in the city's Skid Road and Central Districts launched the careers of musicians including Ray Charles and Quincy Jones. Both Jones and, later, Jimi Hendrix attended Garfield High School, and in the '60s, such garage rock/proto punk bands as the Sonics and the Wailers emerged, and in the '70s, Heart. The '80s saw such Seattle heavy metal acts as Queensrÿche and Metal Church gain popularity, while Seattle native Duff McKagan went on to massive success with Guns N' Roses after relocating to Los Angeles. But it was perhaps the early '90s grunge movement for which Seattle is best known from a musical perspective. During this time such acts as Mother Love Bone, Nirvana, Pearl Jam, Soundgarden, Temple of the Dog, Alice in Chains, and Mudhoney scored massive worldwide hits, and turned the musical tide from glam metal to a style that borrowed equally from garage rockers (the Sonics), punk (the Stooges), and '70s heavy metal (Black Sabbath).

== Environmental sustainability ==
In 1971, Weldon Robison along with Ron Ralph established a community based non-profit glass recycling effort in the Eastlake Community of Seattle. It was simply called "The Glass Barrel" and was registered and incorporated as a non-profit enterprise with the City of Seattle. Three sites were established on Fairview Ave East and one above the houseboats on Portage Bay. Glass was separated in three colors and deposited in three separate oil drums.

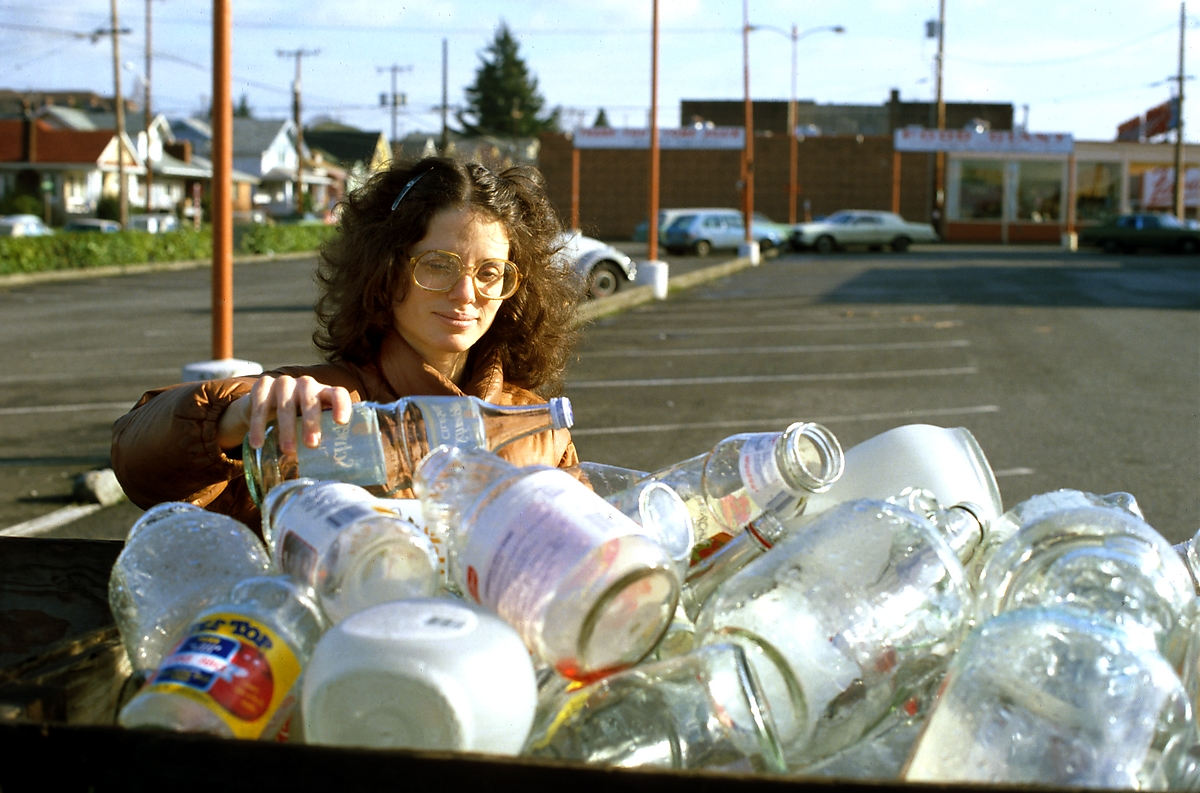
Recycling glass in 1990, before curbside recycling collections began.

Seattle was voted the United States' most "green" city by the NRDC (Natural Resources Defense Council), which gave the following reasons for the designation (among others):

1. Seattle mayor Greg Nickels founded the United States Conference of Mayors' Climate Agreement in 2005. Since then over 900 cities have signed on. The charter of the Agreement is to reduce the environmental impact of U.S. cities on the environment and meet the Kyoto environmental protocols, sidestepping the Bush administration's refusal to sign on.
2. Over 90% of the city's electric demand is fed by hydroelectric power.
3. Comprehensive recycling and sustainable resource use practices.
4. The most successful car- and van-pool program in the country.
5. Expansion of the city's light rail system.

The city's populace is also environmentally conscious, stemming from the natural beauty and landscape surrounding the area. Land use policies and natural geography have led to an increase in property value as the aforementioned boom in population with the arrival of Microsoft, new business for Boeing, and the foundation of Starbucks as a global corporation, has put a strain on availability of single family home property.

== See also ==
- Timeline of Seattle, 1950s-present
