= Viktors Pupols =

American chess player (born 1934)

Viktors Pūpols
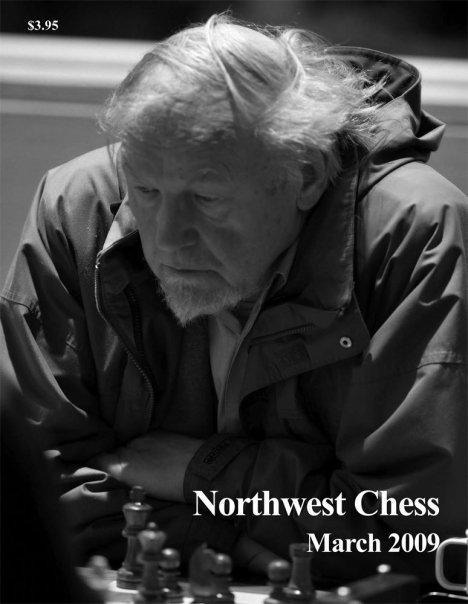
- Pūpols in 2009

Personal information
- Born: July 31, 1934 (age 92) Riga, Latvia

Chess career
- Country: United States
- Title: USCF Life Master (1994); FIDE Candidate Master (1992)
- Peak rating: 2239 (January 2006)

Viktors Pūpols (born July 31, 1934) is a Latvian-born American chess master. A refugee who fled Soviet-occupied Latvia at age ten in the final days of World War II, he immigrated to the United States after five years in displaced persons camps in Germany and settled in Washington State in 1953.

Pūpols is best known for defeating the future World Chess Champion Bobby Fischer at the 1955 U.S. Junior Championship, one of only two games Fischer ever lost on time. A four-time Washington State Champion, he also won the Keres Memorial in Vancouver in 1980. He holds the USCF Life Master (1994) and FIDE Candidate Master (1992) titles and has been the subject of Larry Parr and Yasser Seirawan's biography Viktors Pupols, American Master.

A longtime fixture of Pacific Northwest chess, Pūpols was a regular at Seattle's Last Exit on Brooklyn coffeehouse from the late 1960s, where he became an early mentor to future grandmaster Yasser Seirawan.

== Early life ==
He learned chess at age seven after discovering a chess set while rummaging through a cabinet; his father showed him how the pieces moved and left it at that.

He grew up under successive occupations: first Soviet (1940-1941), then Nazi German (1941-1944), then Soviet again. On June 14, 1941, Soviet authorities deported approximately 30,000 residents of Riga. As the war ended in 1945, Pūpols and his family fled westward to avoid the returning Soviet forces. On May 8, 1945, the last day of the war in Europe, ten-year-old Pūpols reached Allied lines on foot, roughly half an hour ahead of Soviet troops, wearing a winter coat and carrying everything he owned.

He spent the next five years in displaced persons camps in Allied-occupied Germany before immigrating to the United States by steamship. After initially settling in Nebraska, his family relocated to Washington State in 1953, drawn by the milder climate.

== Chess career ==
Pūpols first competed in the Washington State Championship in 1954. Entirely self-taught, he developed his game while working multiple jobs and without access to formal coaching or the chess infrastructure available on the East Coast.

In 1955, he won the Washington State Junior Championship after a playoff victory over James McCormick. That same year, he drove to the U.S. Junior Championship in Lincoln, Nebraska, where he defeated twelve-year-old Bobby Fischer using the Latvian Gambit. Fischer, who was staying with the tournament organizer's family, lost on time, one of only two occasions this occurred in his career. Pūpols later recalled that Fischer "looked like he might be close to" crying after the loss.

He won the Washington State Championship outright in 1961, 1974, and 1989, and tied for first in 1978. In 1964, he won the championship tournament but lost the title to Gerald Ronning in a playoff match.

In 1975, he tied for 6th-11th at a tournament in Vancouver won by Paul Keres shortly before Keres's death. He won the Keres Memorial in Vancouver in 1980. He won the Idaho Open three consecutive years (1984-1986). He won the Eastern Washington Open in both 1956 and 2005, a span of 49 years between titles.

Pūpols has competed in 24 U.S. states and four foreign countries. He has victories against grandmasters Arthur Bisguier and Pal Benko, and wins and draws against Walter Browne. He faced Viktor Korchnoi in Las Vegas, losing quickly after arriving exhausted from a hiking trip in the Grand Canyon.

He earned the FIDE Candidate Master title on May 25, 1992, and the USCF Life Master title on April 4, 1994.

== Last Exit on Brooklyn and Seirawan ==
From the late 1960s, Pūpols was a regular at the Last Exit on Brooklyn, a coffeehouse in Seattle's University District known as an informal gathering place for chess players, activists, and academics. He would drive in from Kitsap County specifically to play there.

In the early 1970s, a teenage Yasser Seirawan began appearing at the Last Exit, bicycling over from Garfield High School. Pūpols later recalled teasing the younger player by pretending not to see him, joking, "Did you hear something? Was it under a table?" Seirawan was unfazed and learned quickly. Pūpols estimates he played more games with Seirawan than anyone else and recorded more wins against him than any other opponent, though these came during Seirawan's developmental years.

A photograph of Pūpols and Seirawan appeared on the cover of Northwest Chess in January 1975; the two recreated the pose at the 2012 U.S. Open.

== Personal life ==
Pūpols met his wife, Deborah, at the Last Exit on Brooklyn, where she worked. She later sought employment at his business in Kitsap County, where he recognized her and hired her. They married after both had ended previous marriages.

He has been a member of the Tacoma Chess Club since the 1950s, winning the club championship in 1955. He is affectionately known as "Uncle Vik" among Pacific Northwest chess players.
