= Bulldog News =

Coffee shop and newsstand in Seattle, Washington, U.S.

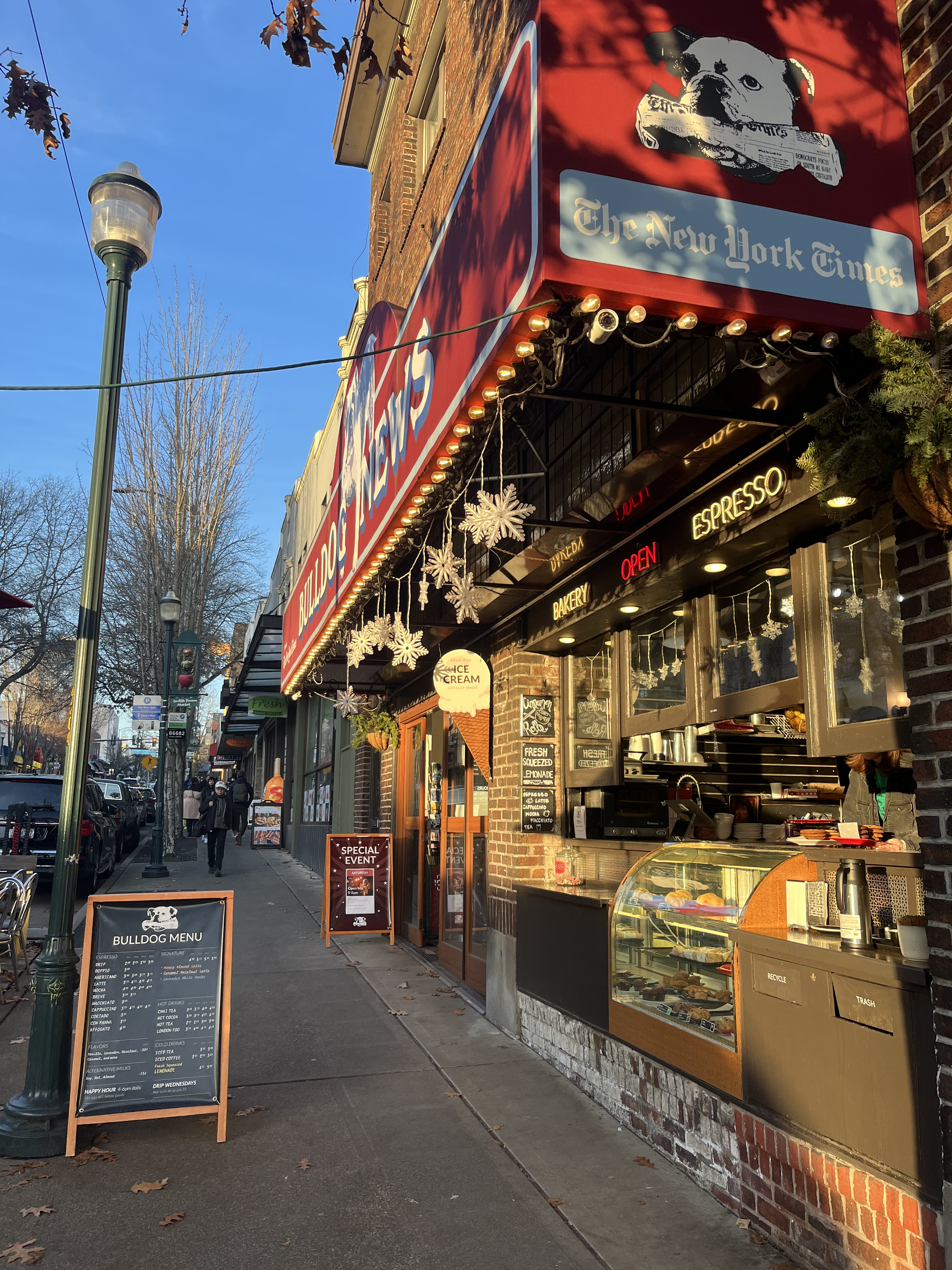
- The exterior of Bulldog News in 2023
- Interactive map of Bulldog News

Restaurant information
- Established: 1983
- Location: Seatlle, Washington, United States
- Coordinates: 47°39′31″N 122°18′47″W

Bulldog News is a coffee shop and newsstand in Seattle, in the U.S. state of Washington. The cafe has operated in the University District since 1983, and has had an outpost on Capitol Hill.

== Description ==
Bulldog News has a coffee bar, an ice cream booth, and a magazine wall with more than 800 titles. Lonely Planet has said, "this place has pretty much every magazine or newspaper you might want, from imports to big glossies to stapled-together zines. There's an excellent street-side espresso window peddling good coffee, croissants and muffins". The business stocks "periodicals from the world over", including "the latest alternative journals and in-your-face zines".

== History ==
The business has operated in the University District since 1983. Spouses Doug Campbell and Gloria Seborg are the owners.

In addition to the University District location, Bulldog has operated a kiosk in the Broadway Market building on Capitol Hill.

In 2017, Bulldog was a member of U-District Small Businesses, a coalition of businesses in the University District seeking to fund an impact study.

== Reception ==
The Not for Tourists Guide to Seattle says visitors can "pick up a copy of Obscure French Cinema Monthly and People simultaneously". In 2017, Daniel Person of Seattle Weekly called Bulldog News "iconic". Bulldog News has been called "perhaps the best designed stand in the city".
