= Graduate Seattle =

Hotel in Seattle, Washington, U.S.

Graduate by Hilton Seattle
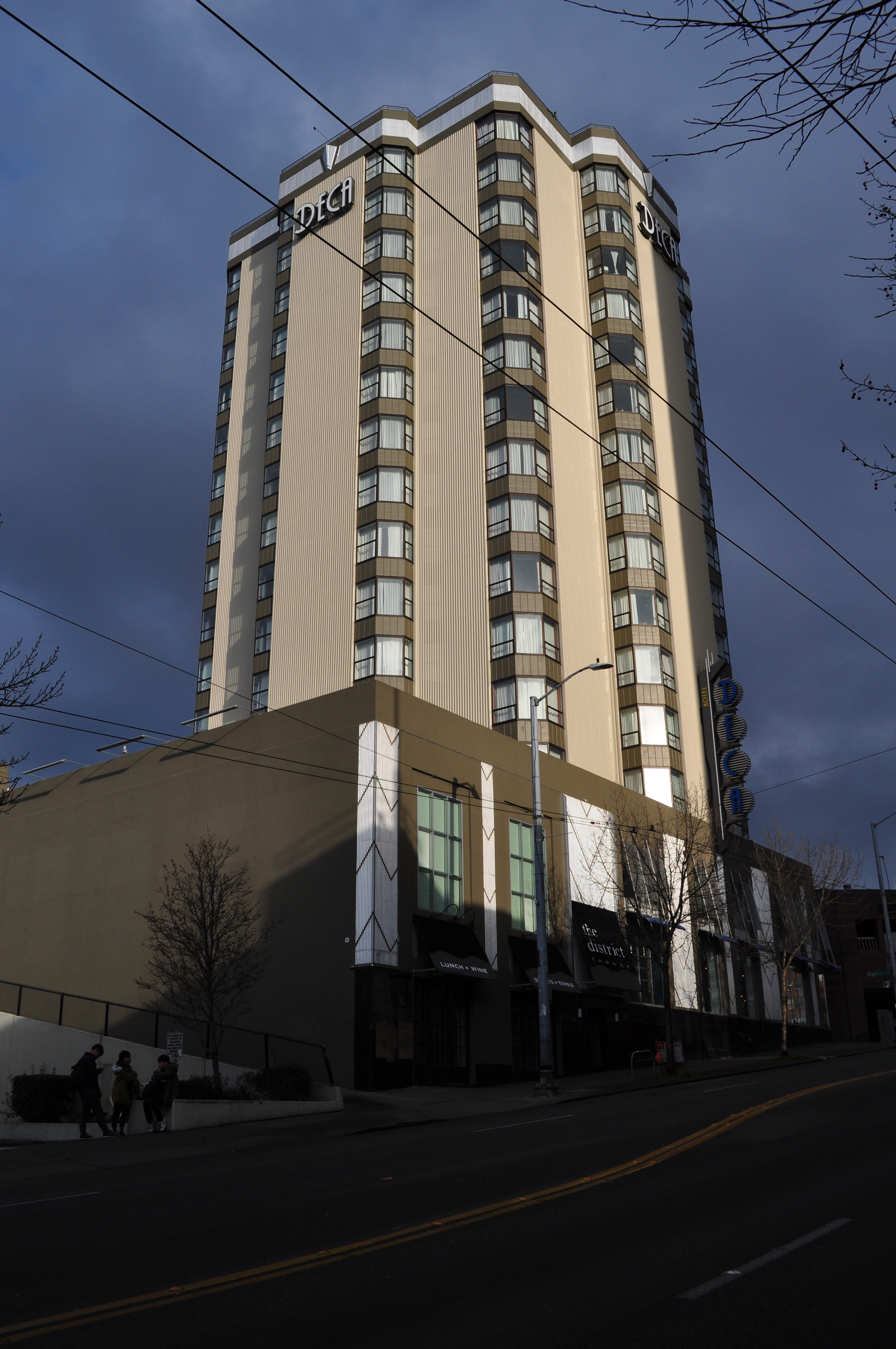
- Exterior of Hotel Deca in 2015
- Interactive map of the Graduate by Hilton Seattle area
- Former names: Hotel Deca

General information
- Location: Seattle, Washington, United States
- Coordinates: 47.66167°N 122.31455°W
- Owner: AJ Capital Partners

The Graduate by Hilton Seattle is a historic Art Deco hotel in Seattle's University District.

== History ==
The Edmond Meany Hotel opened in November 1931. It was later known as the Meany Tower Hotel and the University Tower Hotel, before becoming the Hotel Deca in 2008. It was renovated from 2017-2018 and reopened as the Graduate Seattle in November 2018.

Hilton Worldwide bought the Graduate Hotels brand in May 2024, and operates the hotel as Graduate by Hilton Seattle. However, the Graduate Hotels structures are still owned by AJ Capital Partners.
