= The College Inn =

- U.S. National Register of Historic Places
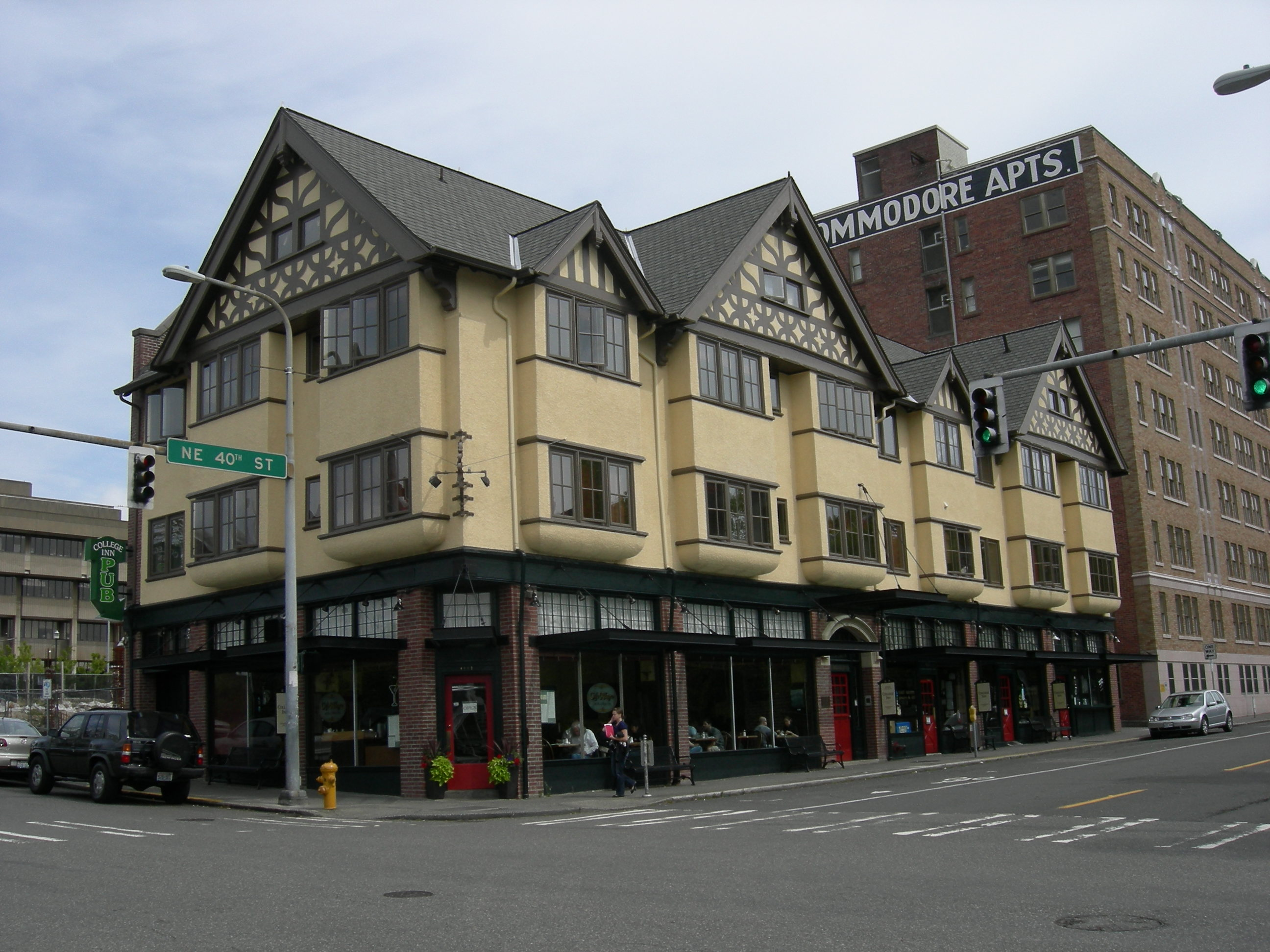
- Location: 4000 University Way N.E. Seattle, Washington
- Coordinates: 47°39′26″N 122°18′42″W
- Built: 1909
- Architect: Graham & Myers
- Architectural style: Tudor Revival
- NRHP reference No.: 82004256
- Added to NRHP: February 25, 1982

The College Inn (formerly known as Ye College Inn) is a nationally recognized historic building in Seattle, Washington. It is located at the Northeast corner of University Way NE and NE 40th Street in the University District across from the University of Washington campus.

== History ==
=== Early 20th Century ===
The Inn was originally commissioned by landowner J.R. Hendren as a corporation at its inception on June 7, 1908, but managed by Emily Cridland, at the time of its opening in 1909.

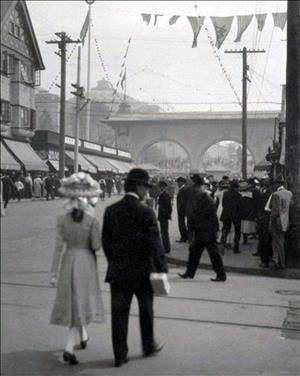
Alaska-Yukon-Pacific Exposition main gate and Ye College Inn (left), Seattle, 1909

Built by local developer Charles Cowen (namesake of nearby Cowen Park), the inn was designed in late 1908 by Graham & Myers, and is one of the few remaining commercial buildings in the Seattle area that displays classic Tudor Revival architecture. It was built by contractor S.E. Young for $30,000.

At the inn's finalized construction, the University of Washington campus was hosting the Alaska–Yukon–Pacific Exposition, a world fair dedicated to publicizing the development of the Pacific Northwest. The hotel's opening day coincided with the starting date of the Exposition, serving as one of the few commercial buildings in the immediate area built in time for the event.

Following the exposition, Cowen acquired the inn, and by 1916, the property was officially rebranded as the College Hotel, marketed as a "European-style" establishment. Since, the building's ground floor has housed various businesses, from restaurants, confectioneries, cigar shops, and other various services catering to travelers.

=== Late 20th Century ===
Following a complete restoration in 1979, the inn was listed on the National Register of Historic Places in 1982, and now stands as the oldest hotel remaining in Seattle.

This restoration included the reintroduction of the building's historical architectural features, such as original room configurations, and a terrazzo floor with the “Ye College Inn” inscription still intact. The attic was also remodeled to include a guest breakfast room and piano lounge.

=== Present ===
Currently, the building still houses the original hotel (The College Inn Hotel), a restaurant, three cafes, and the unassociated College Inn Pub in the building's basement.

== Trivia ==
A local legend of past pub owners is the ghost of Howard Bok, a sailor who once allegedly stayed in the inn only to be murdered in a small back room of the pub (known as the Snug Room). He is rumored to play the piano that sits there after-hours to this day, and the pub even features a “Howard’s Special” to commemorate him.

== See also ==
- National Register of Historic Places listings in Seattle
