= Yasser Seirawan =

American chess grandmaster (born 1960)

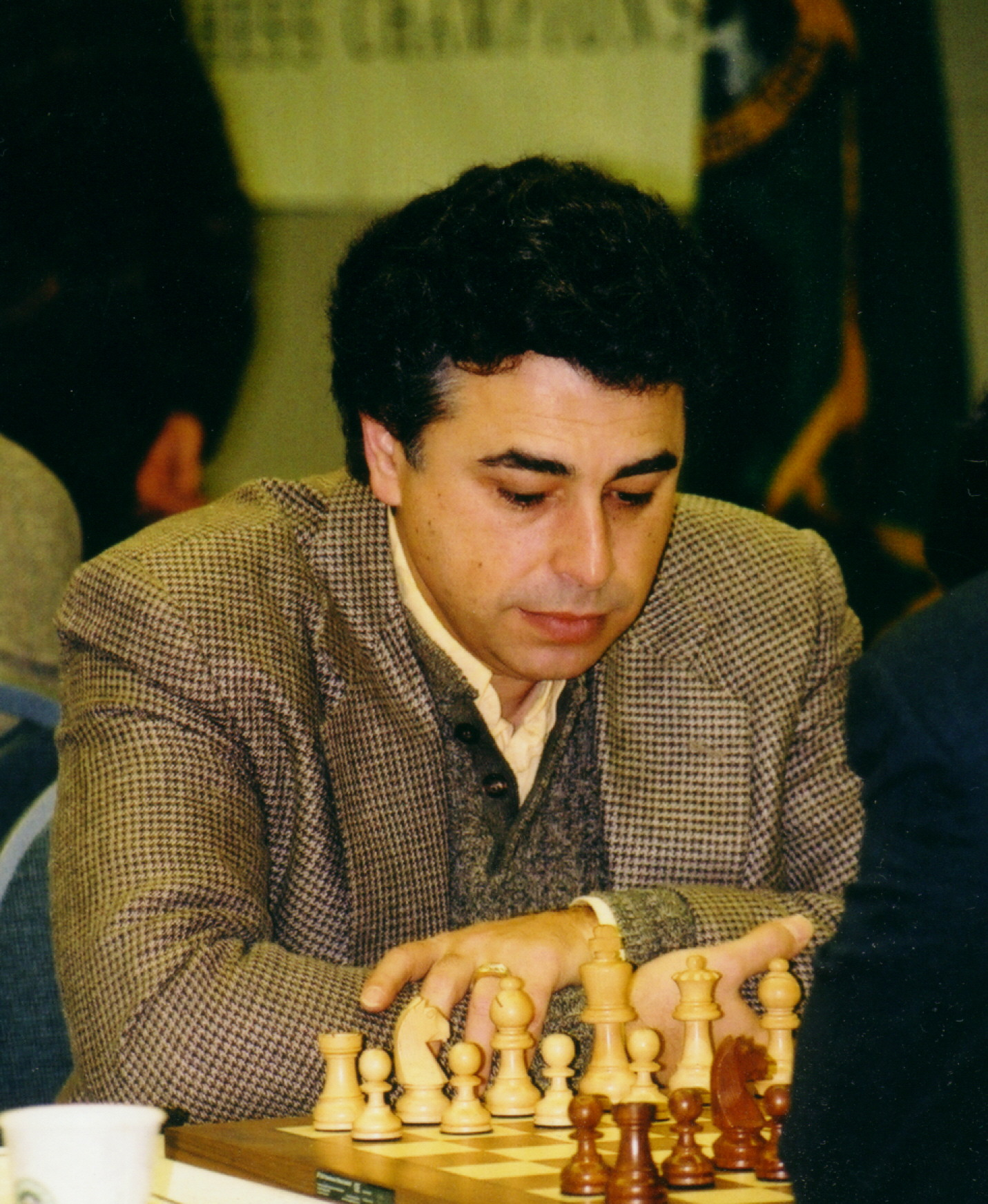
- Seirawan at the 2003 United States Chess Championship

Personal information
- Born: March 24, 1960 (age 66) Damascus, Syria
- Spouse: Yvette Nagel

Chess career
- Country: United States
- Title: Grandmaster (1980)
- FIDE rating: 2620 (October 2026)
- Peak rating: 2658 (November 2011)
- Peak ranking: No. 10 (July 1990)

Yasser Seirawan (Arabic: ياسر سيروان; born March 24, 1960) is an American chess grandmaster and four-time United States champion. He won the World Junior Chess Championship in 1979. Seirawan is also a published chess author and commentator.

== Early life ==
Seirawan was born in Damascus, Syria. His father was Syrian and his mother an English nurse from Nottingham, where he spent some time in his early childhood. When he was seven, his family immigrated to Seattle, Washington, where he attended Queen Anne Elementary School, Meany Middle School, and Garfield High School. He honed his game at a now-defunct coffeehouse, the Last Exit on Brooklyn, playing against the likes of Latvian-born master Viktors Pupols and six-time Washington State Champion James Harley McCormick.

== Career ==
Seirawan began playing chess at 12; at 13, he became Washington junior champion. At 19, he won the World Junior Chess Championship. He also won a game against Viktor Korchnoi, who had two years earlier narrowly lost a match for the world championship. Impressed, Viktor then invited Seirawan to Switzerland, where Korchnoi was training for his 1981 world title match against Anatoly Karpov.

Seirawan qualified for the 1985 and 1988-1990 Candidates Tournaments. In the 1985 tournament in Montpellier he scored 7/15 placing joint 10th, and in the 1988–1990 tournament in St John, a knockout tournament, he was knocked out by Jon Speelman in the preliminary round.

Seirawan was the highest rated American player on 19 monthly FIDE rating lists between July 1982 and January 2002.

In 1990, he won a match against Jan Timman sponsored by KRO by the score of +3-1=2.

For 12 years, he was the chief editor of the Inside Chess magazine. The magazine was sold to the ChessCafe.com website, on which old articles were featured.

In 1999, Seirawan played a ten-game match against Michael Adams in Bermuda. The match was drawn +2–2=6.

In 2001, Seirawan released a plan called "Fresh Start" to reunite the chess world, which at that time had two world champions: Ruslan Ponomariov had gained the title under the auspices of FIDE, while Vladimir Kramnik had beaten Garry Kasparov to take the Classical title. It called for one match between Ponomariov and Kasparov (the world number one), and another between Kramnik and the winner of the 2002 Einstein tournament in Dortmund, who turned out to be Péter Lékó. The winners of these matches would then play each other to become undisputed World Champion. This plan was signed by all parties on May 6, 2002, in the so-called "Prague Agreement". The Kramnik-Leko match took place (the match was drawn, with Kramnik retaining his title); the Kasparov-Ponomariov match was canceled in 2003, and this particular plan became moot when Kasparov retired in 2005. In the end, the FIDE World Chess Championship 2006 between Kramnik and Veselin Topalov reunited the world championship title.

Following a series of events, such as Seirawan participating in the Beijing Chess Challenge in September 2003, there were reports that he would be retiring as a professional player. In the July 2007 FIDE list, Seirawan had an Elo rating of 2634, placing him in the top 100 chess players in the world, and America's number four, behind Hikaru Nakamura, Gata Kamsky, and Alexander Onischuk. He played six games in the July 2007 FIDE update.

In 2007, Seirawan unveiled a chess variant created in collaboration with Bruce Harper, called Seirawan chess or SHARPER chess. SHARPER chess introduces two additional pieces, a "hawk" and an "elephant"—a rook/knight and a bishop/knight combination that in other variants are called the Empress and Princess, respectively. The initial position is that of standard chess. Whenever the player moves a piece from its starting position, one of the extra pieces in hand may be placed immediately on the square just vacated. Likewise, pawns may promote to a hawk or an elephant in addition to the standard pieces. The first ever event was a 12-board simultaneous exhibition held on March 31, 2007, in Vancouver, British Columbia, Canada.

In May 2011, Seirawan returned from hiatus to competitive chess, playing for the U.S. team in the world team championship in China, where he won silver in first alternate. He had wins versus top GMs Judit Polgar and Shakhriyar Mamedyarov. He only lost one game.

Seirawan won the 2011 and 2012 Dutch Open Blitz championship.

Seirawan is widely known for his expert commentary in live broadcasts on the Internet during important events. He has been named by the chess historian Edward Winter as one of the top five Internet broadcasters. In 2019, he joined the Chessbrahs and provided coverage for the 2019 World Cup.

== Books ==
Seirawan has written several books.

The "Winning Chess" series (with co-author IM Jeremy Silman):

- Play Winning Chess - Introduction to chess and some basic strategies
- Winning Chess Tactics - Introduction to tactics with puzzles
- Winning Chess Strategies - How to use small advantages and use strategies to gain them
- Winning Chess Openings - Brief descriptions of the most popular openings, and opening strategies
- Winning Chess Endings - Introduction to the endgame
- Winning Chess Brilliancies - Notable games analyzed by the author
- Winning Chess Combinations - How to recognize the main combination patterns; somewhat of a follow-up to Winning Chess Tactics

The "Winning Chess" series was originally published by Microsoft Press; it is now published by Everyman Chess.

- Five Crowns: Kasparov-Karpov World Chess Championship 1990 New York - Lyon (with Jonathan Tisdall), International chess Enterprises, 1991. ISBN 978-1879479029
- Take My Rooks (with Nikolay Minev), International Chess Enterprises, 1991. ISBN 978-1879479012
- No Regrets • Fischer–Spassky 1992 (with George Stefanovic), International Chess Enterprises, 1992, ISBN 1-879479-09-5
- Chess on the Edge (with Bruce Harper) - collected games of Grandmaster Duncan Suttles, published by Chess'n Math Association in March 2008.
- Chess Duels: My Games with the World Champions, Everyman Chess, 2010, ISBN 978-1857445879

== Personal life ==
Seirawan is married to Woman FIDE Master Yvette Nagel, daughter of Dutch politician Jan Nagel.

== Legacy ==
The chess opening Seirawan attack (1.d4 Nf6 2.c4 e6 3.Bg5) is named after him. He is also known for the Seirawan line in the King's Indian Defence (1. d4 Nf6 2. c4 g6 3. Nc3 Bg7 4. e4 d6 5. Bd3), where White has the plan of continuing with Nge2 and O-O.

| Preceded by Walter Browne, Larry Evans, and Larry Christiansen | United States Chess Champion; 1981–1983 (with Walter Browne) | Succeeded by Walter Browne, Larry Christiansen, and Roman Dzindzichashvili |
| Preceded by Lev Alburt | United States Chess Champion; 1986 | Succeeded by Nick de Firmian and Joel Benjamin |
| Preceded by Michael Wilder | United States Chess Champion; 1989 (with Roman Dzindzichashvili and Stuart Rachels) | Succeeded by Lev Alburt |
| Preceded by Boris Gulko | United States Chess Champion; 2000–2001 (with Joel Benjamin and Alexander Shabalov) | Succeeded by Larry Christiansen |
