= University District, Seattle =

Coordinates: 47°39′18″N 122°18′12″W

University District U District
- Seattle Neighborhood
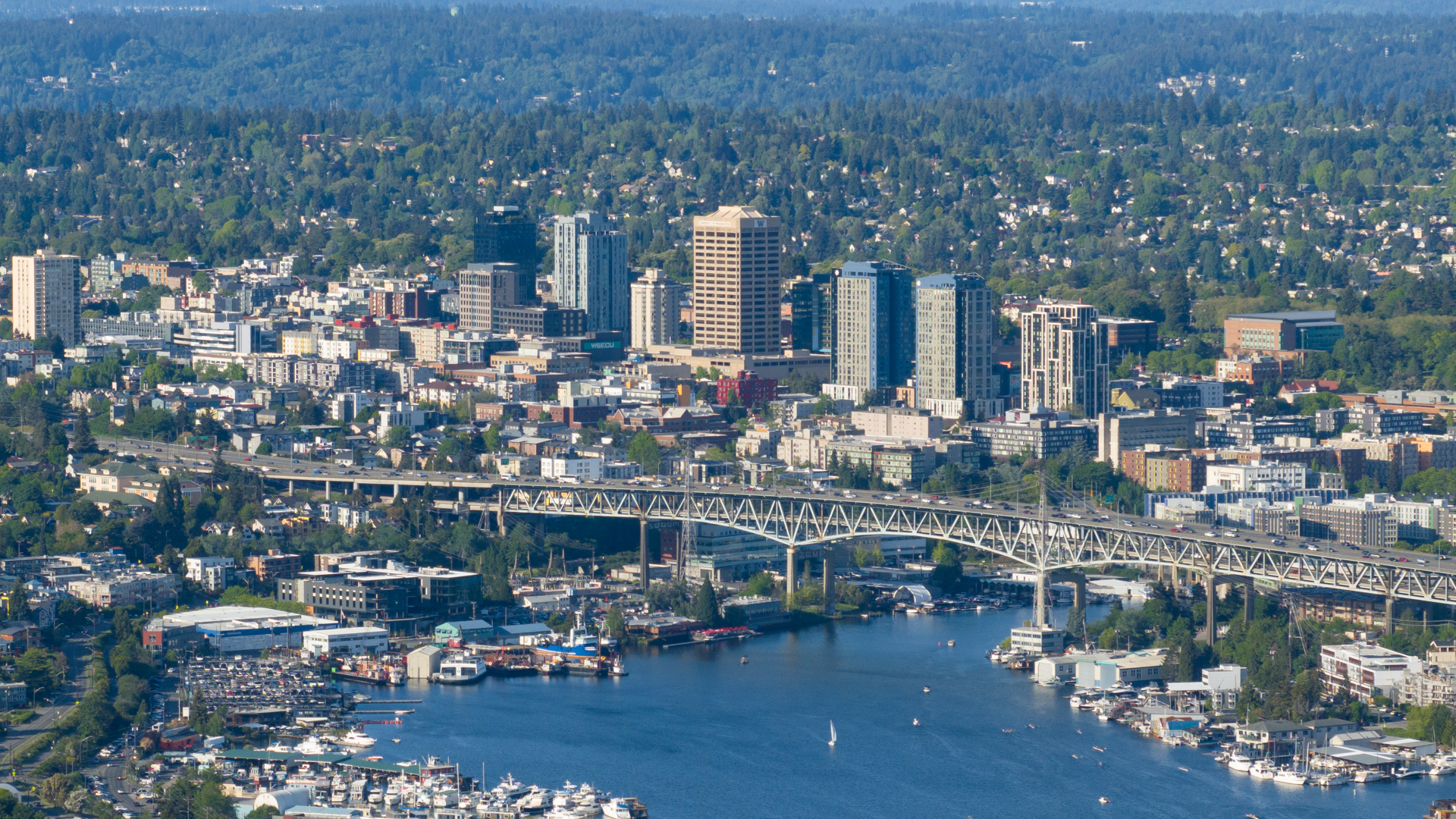
- Aerial view of the University District from the southwest with the Ship Canal Bridge in the foreground

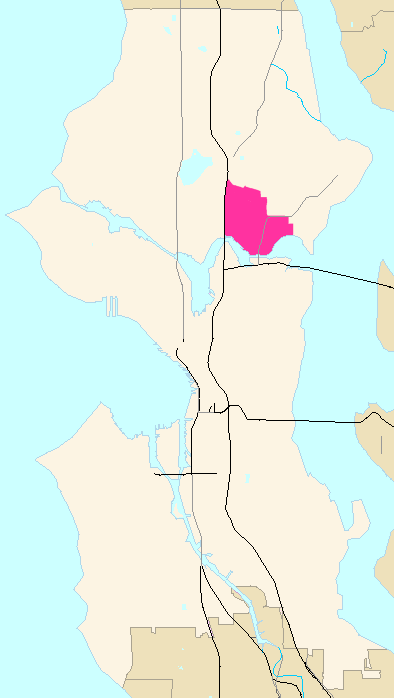
- Map of the University District's location in Seattle

Population (2023)
  - Total: 23,248
- Website: visitseattle.org/university-district

The University District (commonly the U District) is a neighborhood and a major district in central northeastern Seattle, Washington, comprising several distinct neighborhoods. The main campus of the University of Washington (UW) is located in the district, lending its name to both the district as well as University Way NE (commonly The Ave). The neighborhood lies north of Portage Bay and the Lake Washington Ship Canal and generally east of Interstate 5.

The area, originally a Duwamish settlement, was surveyed by the territorial government in 1855 and opened to settlement in 1867. Real estate developers created the Brooklyn neighborhood on the west side of the district in the 1890s, which was followed by the relocation of the UW campus to the east side of the district in 1895. The name Brooklyn faded from use in favor of "University District", which was adopted after a public contest in 1919.

== Location ==
Like all Seattle neighborhoods, the boundaries of the University District are informal; by common usage, the University District is bounded on the west by Interstate 5; on the east by University Village and Union Bay; on the south by Portage Bay and the Lake Washington Ship Canal; and on the north by NE Ravenna Boulevard.

== History ==
The area north of Portage Bay and west of Lake Washington has been inhabited since the end of the Vashon Glaciation approximately 16,000 years before present. The most recent Native American settlement in the area were the Duwamish villages of the Lushootseed-speaking Coast Salish peoples. The Duwamish had several prominent villages in and around the University District, including sluʔwiɫ and wəq̓iq̓əb ("place of frogs") on Portage Bay. Other identified placenames include "SWAH-tsoo-gweel" ("portage") and "hehs-KWEE-kweel" ("skate") on Union Bay. The Duwamish peoples living in this area were known as xacuabš ("people of the big lake").

The Duwamish also had trails through the areas that connected the village sites with waterways and fire-managed (burned) areas. These areas were cleared by fire for hunting purposes and to promote good crop growth. Blackberries, salmonberries, and root crops were plentiful, along with game including wolves, cougar, bear, deer and elk. One trail found by early non-native surveyors of the area extended from Portage Bay to Lake Washington and connected two native encampments, one on Portage Bay near the foot of Brooklyn Ave and one on Union Bay. No remnants of the Native American use of the area are extant in the University District today. The area now occupied by University Village was at that time a much larger Union Bay prior to the artificial lowering of Lake Washington.

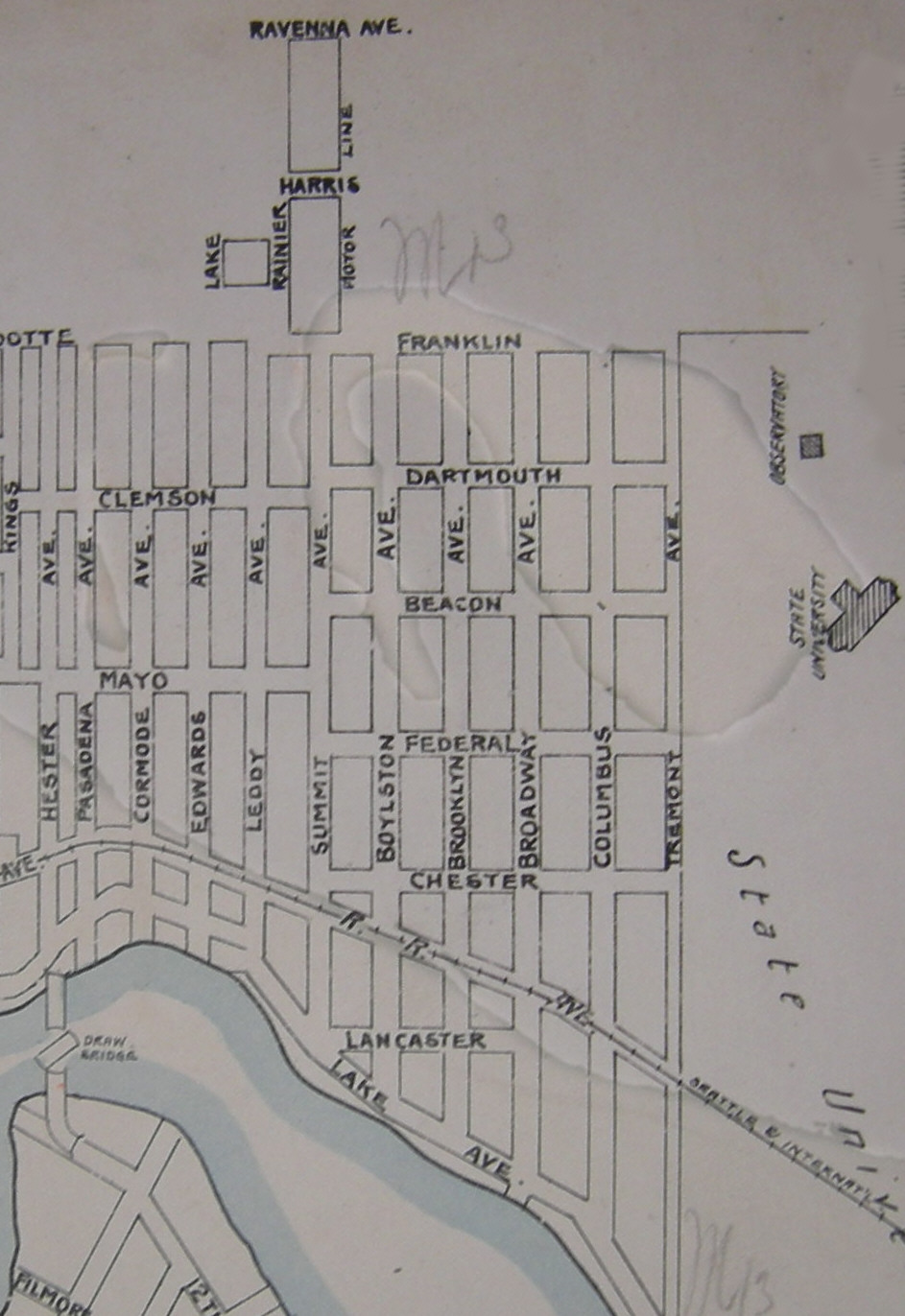
1893 map of recently platted Brooklyn

The district was first surveyed in 1855; surveyors noted the presence of an existing trail used by indigenous communities as well as large Douglas fir and red cedar trees that impeded their path. The first white settlers in the area, Christian and Harriet Brownfield, established their homestead claim west of modern-day 15th Avenue Northeast in 1867. A portion of the surveyed land had already been reserved for public education use under territorial laws, either for a facility or to be sold to raise funds.

In 1890, the district began to enter a growth phase, and the portion due west of the present University of Washington campus was laid out as the Brooklyn Addition. This land was owned by real estate developer James A. Moore, his wife, and the Clise Investment Company and included much of the original Brownfield homestead. This central area was called Brooklyn, which gave the current Brooklyn Avenue in the neighborhood its name. Brooklyn was slower to develop than areas to the north and west such as Ravenna and Latona, due to those areas being more gently sloped and located closer to the central lakes (Union and Green Lakes). Materials for land/street development and improvements were hauled in by horse-drawn wagons. One year later (in 1891) much of the land north of the Ship Canal, including the future University District, was annexed by the City of Seattle.

In the early 1870s, coal was discovered east of Seattle in the Newcastle area near Bellevue. The coal was transported across Lake Washington to Union Bay, and initially was portaged across Montlake to eventually reach Elliott Bay. After around 1888, the Seattle Lake Shore and Eastern Railway was built and ran along tracks which now form the Burke–Gilman Trail, a major bike commuting and recreation path across North Seattle.

Below, an 1894 report describes a train wreck just west of the current University District in the Latona neighborhood (now located west of I-5).

August 20, 1894. Wreck on [the] Seattle, Lake Shore and Eastern just west of Latone [now Latona Avenue]. Freight train from Gilman [now Snoqualmie] hit a cow. [Trainload was a] [m]ixer freight train, 10 co[a]l cars, logs and box cars. Train had slowed down at Brooklyn [Avenue] for cows. Engineer saw cows on a bank beyond Latona looking (?) one another[!]. One cow was tossed over [the] bank and hit the track just as [the] engine came by. [The] [e]ngine was raised off the track[,] and when it came down [the] wheels went off the rails. Engineer reversed but [it] was too late. [The] [c]oal tender shot ahead[,] tearing part of [the engine] car [(cab)] off and decapitating [the] fireman and killing [the] brakeman. Engineer and coal passer [were] unhurt. Steam and dust enveloped the derailed cars. Engineer ran to Fremont to telegraph to stop [the] evening passenger train[;] also [illegible] Engineer claimed train going 20 miles per hr.

Seattle, Lake Shore and Eastern train wreck in the University District, August 20, 1894.

Electric streetcar tracks had been laid up Columbus Avenue (later known as 14th Avenue, and later still University Way) either in 1891 or 1892, and the neighborhood soon began to be called "University Station" after the heated waiting house at the corner of what is now NE 42nd Street. The streetcars eventually came to be operated by the Seattle Municipal Street Railway, which ceased operations in 1941. The University of Washington relocated to the east side of 15th Avenue in 1895, leaving its previous location in the Metropolitan Tract in downtown Seattle. Much of the neighborhood was still clear cut forest or stump farmland at the time.

The original name of "Brooklyn" had already faded in use after the university's move in 1895, and several existing social organizations had renamed themselves to variants of "University" by 1903. The Latona post office moved to University Station in 1902 and was followed by the establishment of a public library three years later. The Lake Washington Ship Canal was constructed in the 1910s and included the Montlake Cut, which connects Portage Bay on Lake Union to Union Bay on Lake Washington. The University Bridge opened on July 1, 1919, and carried automobile and streetcar traffic over the Lake Washington Ship Canal to Eastlake. To prepare for the opening of the bridge, the University Commercial Club held a contest to rename 14th Avenue, with "University Way" chosen as the winner. The club also led a campaign to rename the neighborhood to the "University District", which was officially adopted by the city council on May 23, 1919. An alternative proposal was to rename the area "UniverCity", in recognition of the urban character of the district and the major commercial presence along its main streets.

The University District underwent a period of major growth in the 1920s as the university campus underwent renovations led by architect Carl F. Gould to replace the former venues of the 1909 Alaska–Yukon–Pacific Exposition with modern buildings. The university adopted the Collegiate Gothic style for its new buildings and suggested that off-campus follow suit. The neighborhood had at least 20 new residential buildings constructed, along with two movie theaters, and major commercial buildings—among them various department stores and the University Book Store. The Greek Row emerged by the late 1930s as fraternity and sorority houses were constructed on 17th Avenue Northeast; by 1941, there were 41 fraternity and sorority houses on Greek Row. During the Great Depression, commercial development slowed but federal New Deal programs provided funding to replace the University District's post office and improve local bridges.

UW's enrollment grew after the end of World War II and into the 1950s, necessitating the expansion of the university campus beyond 15th Avenue Northeast. The South Campus expansion began in 1960 and was completed a decade later after 42.8 acres (17.3 ha) of industrial land along the north side of Portage Bay had been redeveloped. The opening of Northgate Mall and University Village during the 1950s drew away major retailers from the University District, which would also see the construction of Interstate 5 and the Ship Canal Bridge in the next decade.

== Neighborhoods ==
The City of Seattle does not publish an official neighborhood map, and many neighborhood boundaries in Seattle are somewhat informal.

Neighborhoods within the district include:

- University Park (east from 15th to 25th Avenues NE, north from NE 50th Street to NE Ravenna Boulevard)
- Greek Row (NE 45th to NE 50th Streets, 15th to 22nd Avenues NE)
- University Heights (north of NE 45th Street and west of 15th Avenue NE)
- Brooklyn Addition (west of 15th Avenue NE and south of NE 45th Street)
- University Village (east of 25th Avenue NE)
- Main, West, and South campuses of the University of Washington, including the University of Washington Medical Center

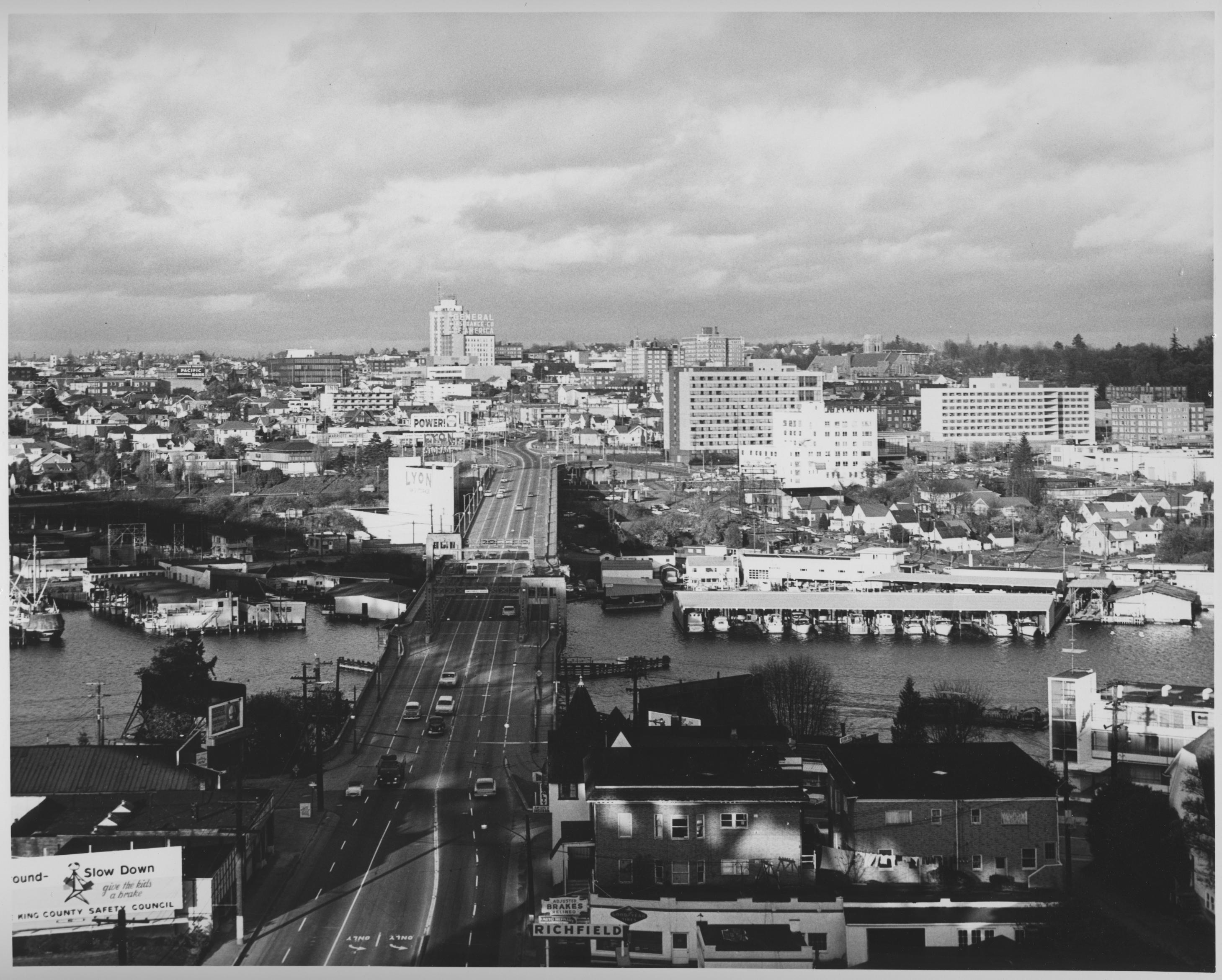
University Bridge and U District, Looking North from I-5 Ship Canal Bridge (1963)

== Infrastructure ==
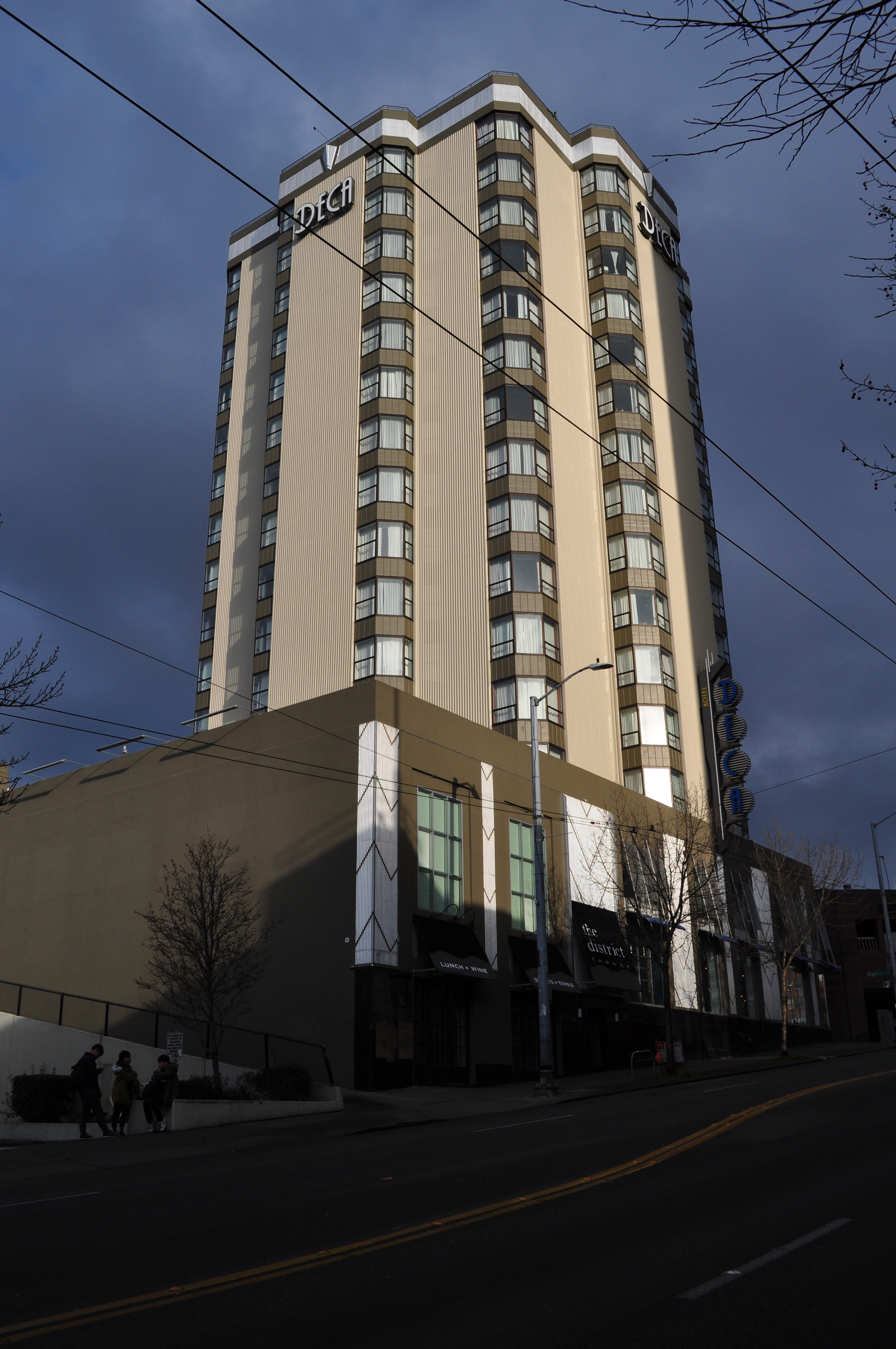
Graduate Hotel Seattle

The district's skyline was formerly defined primarily by the UW campus, UW Tower, and the art deco style Graduate Hotel Seattle (originally the Meany Hotel). The 22-story UW Tower opened in 1975 as the headquarters of the Safeco Corporation and was acquired by the university in 2006.

The city council approved changes to the neighborhood's zoning code in 2017 to prepare for the opening of the U District light rail station. The new zoning designation allows for buildings up of to 320 feet (98 m) between Interstate 5 and 15th Avenue Northeast, with the exception of The Ave. The University District subsequently entered a new period of growth with the construction of several high-rise residential towers that are primarily for student residents.

=== Public transit ===
The district is served by two Link light rail stations: University of Washington station near Husky Stadium opened in 2016 as part of the University Link Extension; and U District on Brooklyn Avenue near NE 45th Street which opened in October 2021 as part of the Northgate Link Extension. Light rail service connects the U District to Capitol Hill and Downtown Seattle to the south, and Roosevelt and Northgate to the north.

=== Streets ===
The neighborhood's north-south arterials are (from west to east) Roosevelt Way NE (southbound only), 11th Avenue NE (northbound only), Brooklyn Avenue NE, University Way NE, and 15th Avenue NE. East-west arterials include NE Pacific Street, NE 45th Street, and part of NE 50th Streets. NE Campus Parkway is a minor east-west arterial, running only west of the campus.

== Culture ==
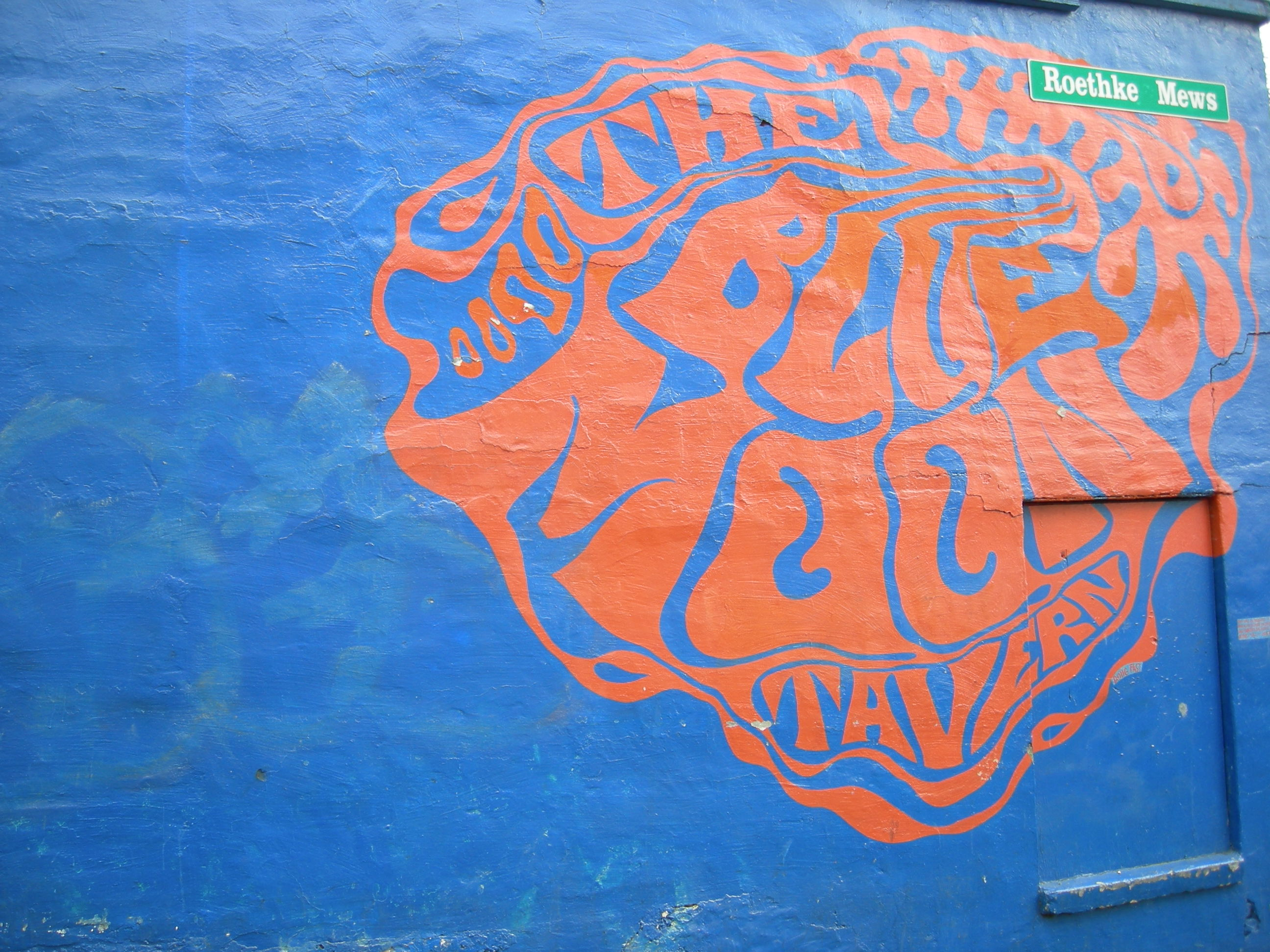
This 1980s sign painted on the side of the 1934 Blue Moon Tavern commemorates its association with the counterculture of the 1960s; the small street sign at upper right declares the alley to be "Roethke Mews" after poet Theodore Roethke, a regular at the tavern when he was a professor at the university in the 1950s and early 1960s.

The annual U District Street Fair is held over a weekend in May, primarily on The Ave, and is among the longest-running street fairs in the United States. It was first held in 1970 with 300 vendors and organized by local merchant and peace activist Andy Shiga of the U District Chamber of Commerce; it grew to 600 vendors and 100,000 visitors later in the decade. The fair was paused in 2020 and 2021 during the COVID-19 pandemic and returned in 2022; it now attracts over 50,000 visitors and has 250 vendors. The neighborhood also has a weekly outdoor farmers' market that was founded in 1993 as one of the first in Seattle.. The U District Chamber of Commerce became the University District Partnership in 2015.

The Blue Moon Tavern has become an unofficial cultural landmark and was founded in 1934. The area was also home to historic coffeehouses that contributed to the city's coffee culture, beginning with Cafe Encore in 1958 and followed by Café Allegro, the oldest still-operating coffeehouse, in 1975. The oldest newsstand in Seattle, Bulldog News, was established in 1983.

The neighborhood was home to several long-running movie theaters and performing arts venues. The Neptune Theatre opened as a movie theater in 1921 and was converted into a performing arts venue in 2011 under the ownership of Seattle Theatre Group. The last remaining movie theater in the neighborhood, the Varsity Theatre on University Way, closed in January 2026. The independent Grand Illusion Cinema was founded in a renovated dental office in 1970 by Randy Finley and was run by the nonprofit Northwest Film Forum. Finley also founded the Seven Gables Theatre at a converted American Legion building in 1976. It was an arthouse theater that operated until 2017; the building was destroyed by a fire in December 2020. The locally owned Scarecrow Video, the largest video rental store on the West Coast, was founded in 1988 and is the last of its kind in the city. It has 140,000 titles and is operated by a nonprofit organization.

== See also ==
- Last Exit on Brooklyn
- Seattle Public Library University Branch
- University Book Store
