= Sunset Hill, Seattle =

Coordinates: 47°41′02″N 122°24′00″W

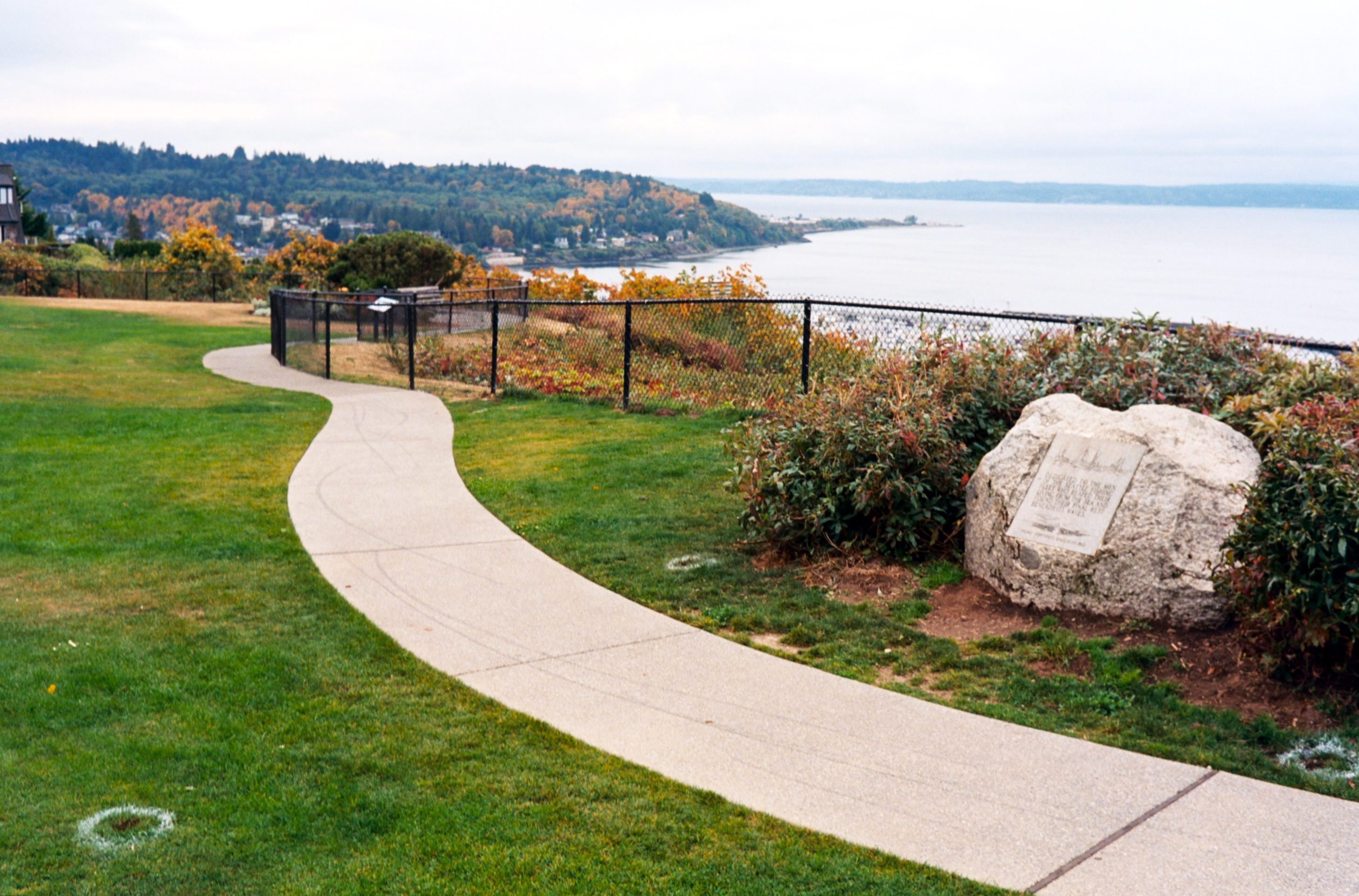
Sunset Hill Park, overlooking Shilshole Bay and across to Magnolia

Sunset Hill is an area located in the northwest corner of the Ballard neighborhood of Seattle, Washington. It is home to the Sunset Hill Community Association. Founded in 1922, it was one of the first Seattle neighborhood associations. It is also home to the Sunset Hill Viewpoint Park, located at 7531 34th Ave NW. This park provides a scenic overlook onto the Shilshole and Elliott bays and provides a popular vantage point for photographs of the Olympic Mountains.
