= Wild Mountain Cafe =

Restaurant in Seattle, Washington, U.S.

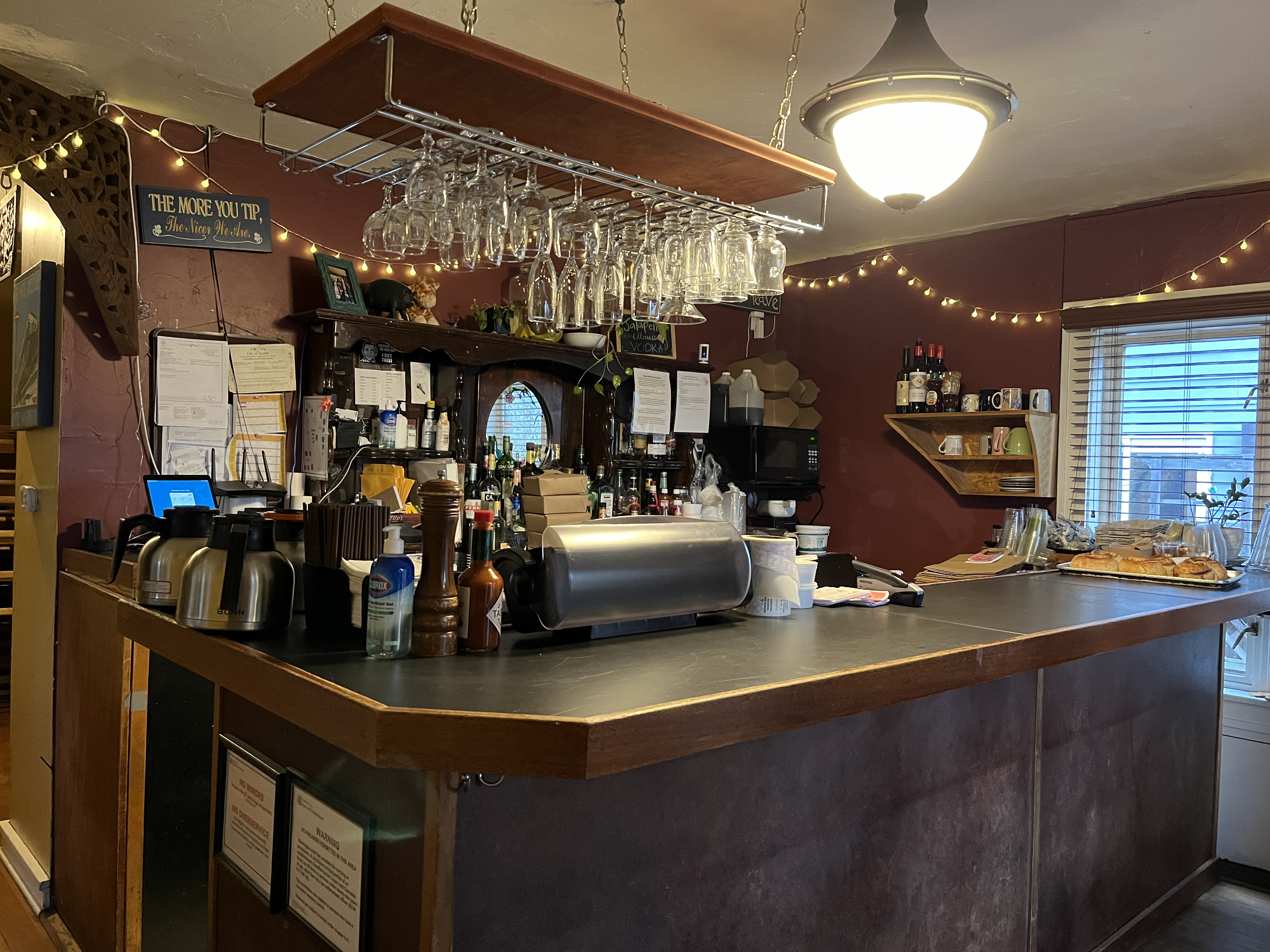
- Part of the restaurant's interior, 2024
- Interactive map of Wild Mountain Cafe

Restaurant information
- Owner: Desirae Aylesworth
- Previous owners: Roo McKenna; Connie Stone
- Food type: American
- Location: 1408 NW 85th Street, Seattle, King, Washington, 98117, United States
- Coordinates: 47.6908°N 122.3746°W

Wild Mountain Cafe is a restaurant operating from a house in Seattle's Ballard / Crown Hill area, in the U.S. state of Washington.

== Description ==
Wild Mountain Cafe operates from a purple house in Seattle. It has a front garden and porch, and serves American cuisine. The menu has included Eggs Benedict, French toast, fried chicken, granola, huevos rancheros, macaroni and cheese, potato pancakes, and a version of chicken Parmesan with bread crumbs. The drink menu has included Bloody Marys and mimosas.

== History ==
Desirae Aylesworth has been the owner since 2019. She runs the cafe with her husband and a small staff. Previously, the business was owned by Roo McKenna and Connie Stone, who opened Wild Mountain Cafe in 2002.

Someone broke into the restaurant in 2009.

== Reception ==
The Not for Tourists Guide to Seattle has said the cafe offers "tasty, funky, spirited home-grown food". Wild Mountain has been highlighted as one of the Seattle metropolitan area's best woman-owned eateries.
