= Genealogical Society of Finland =

- Formation: 30 January 1917
- Founded at: Helsinki
- Headquarters: Kirkkokatu 6
- Chair of the Board: Jouni Elomaa
- Executive Director: P. T. Kuusiluoma
- Website: genealogia.fi/en/

The Genealogical Society of Finland (Finnish: Suomen Sukututkimusseura, Swedish: Genealogiska Samfundet i Finland) is a national voluntary non-governmental organisation promoting the study of genealogy and social history in Finland. The Society itself doesn't do genealogical research, but its purpose is to act as a facilitator and link between genealogists and further Finnish family and personal history research. It also works to lobby the interests of genealogists in Finland and provides considered opinions within the area of its remit. The Society is officially bilingual working both in Finnish and Swedish.

Finnish teacher, journalist and genealogist Eeli Granit-Ilmoniemi founded the Society in 1917. In 2022 it had around 8500 members. The most notable achievements of the Society have been the open church records search database HisKi and the tombstone database, both of which have been created on a voluntary basis. Society's membership is open to everyone who supports the objectives of the Society as stated in the regulations and who are approved by the governing body. A registered association or other legal entity may also become a member.

To meet its objectives the Society arranges seminars and educational events, publishes genealogical research, produces and provides research data services, maintains a library in Helsinki specialising in family and personal history and undertakes collaborative work with other agents in the field. Since 1930's the Society has published the Scientific journal Genos, published four times a year. In addition it also publishes the Genealogical Society of Finland publications series, the Genealogical Society of Finland Guides series and Genealogical Society of Finland Year Book series, which has been published since 1917. Each year the society also organizes the National Genealogical Days of Finland and awards the Genealogical Book of the Year -award.

== See also ==
- Genealogy
- Finns
- Norwegian Genealogical Society
- Swedish-Finn Historical Society
- Genealogical Society of Ireland
- Society of Genealogists
- Finnish Americans
