= Neptune Theatre (Seattle) =

Performing arts venue in Seattle, Washington

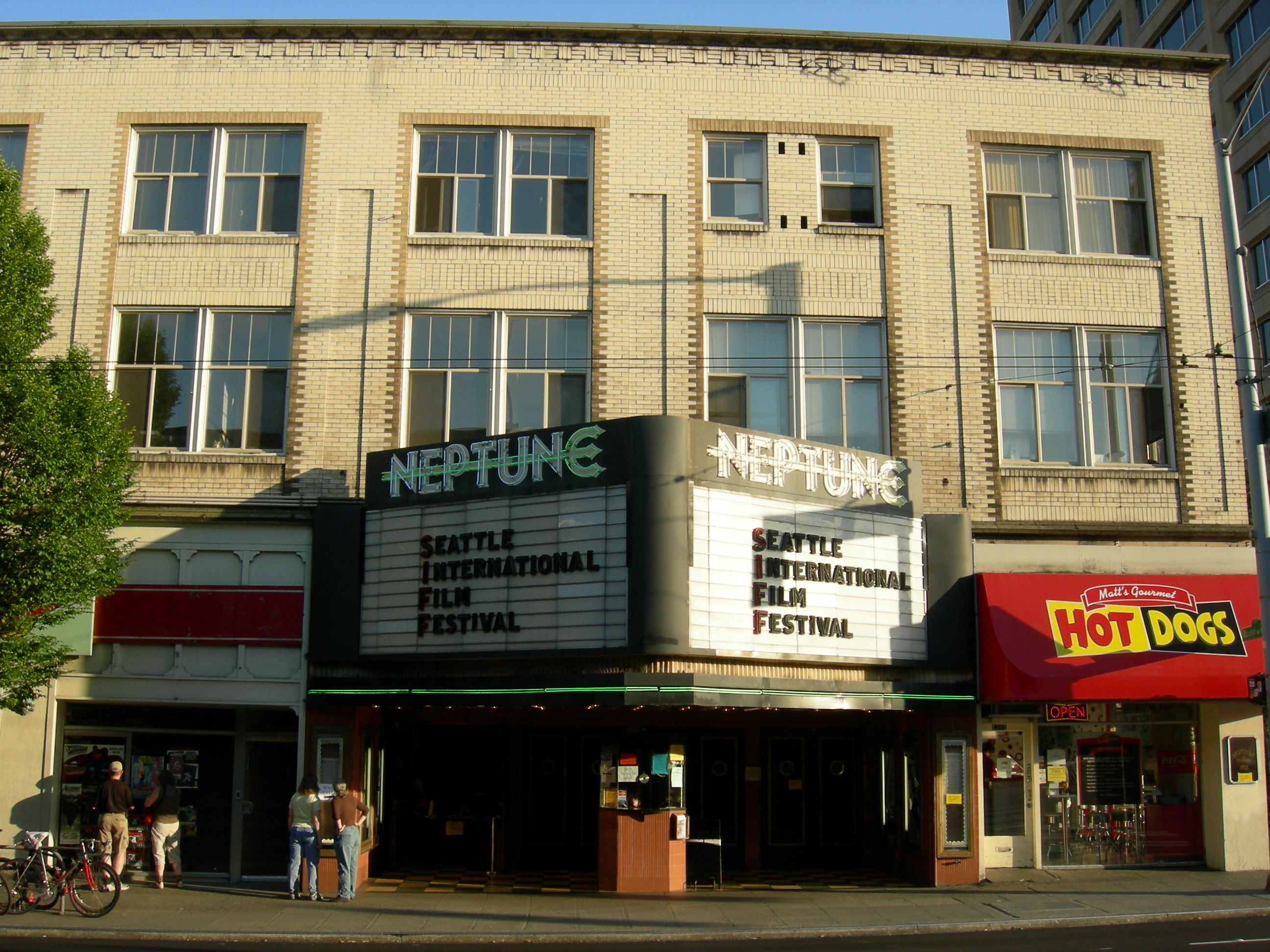
- The theatre's exterior during the 2007 Seattle International Film Festival
- Interactive map of Neptune Theatre
- Former names: U-Neptune Theatre
- Address: 1303 NE 45th St; Seattle, Washington, U.S.
- Coordinates: 47.66116°N 122.31404°W
- Operator: Seattle Theatre Group
- Capacity: 1,000

Construction
- Opened: November 16, 1921
- Renovated: 2011
- Architect: Henderson Ryan

Website
- stgpresents.org/neptune

Seattle Landmark
- Official name: Neptune Building
- Designated: March 11, 2014

The Neptune Theatre, formerly known as U-Neptune Theatre, is a performing arts venue in the University District neighborhood of Seattle, Washington, United States. Opened in 1921, the 1,000 capacity venue hosts a variety of events, including dance and music performances, film screenings, and arts education. It was primarily used for screening classic films prior to a 2011 renovation. In 2014, the theater and building were designated a Seattle landmark.

The Neptune Theatre is operated by the non-profit Seattle Theatre Group, which also operates the Paramount Theatre and Moore Theatre. It is one of several venues that host the annual Seattle International Film Festival.

== Architecture ==
The Neptune Building, which houses the Neptune Theatre and several small businesses, is described as a "vaguely Renaissance Revival style", three-story building with a brick facade. Its north facade, facing NE 45th Street, has a prominent marquee with the word "Neptune" in neon lighting; the final letter "e" in the marquee is stylized as a trident that appears to pierce the other letters. It was designed by Henderson Ryan, a Kentucky-born architect who also worked on the Moore Theatre and Ballard Carnegie Library.

The interior of the Neptune Theatre features a nautical theme, with a central concession stand shaped like a boat, marble finishes, and statues of Neptune.

== History ==
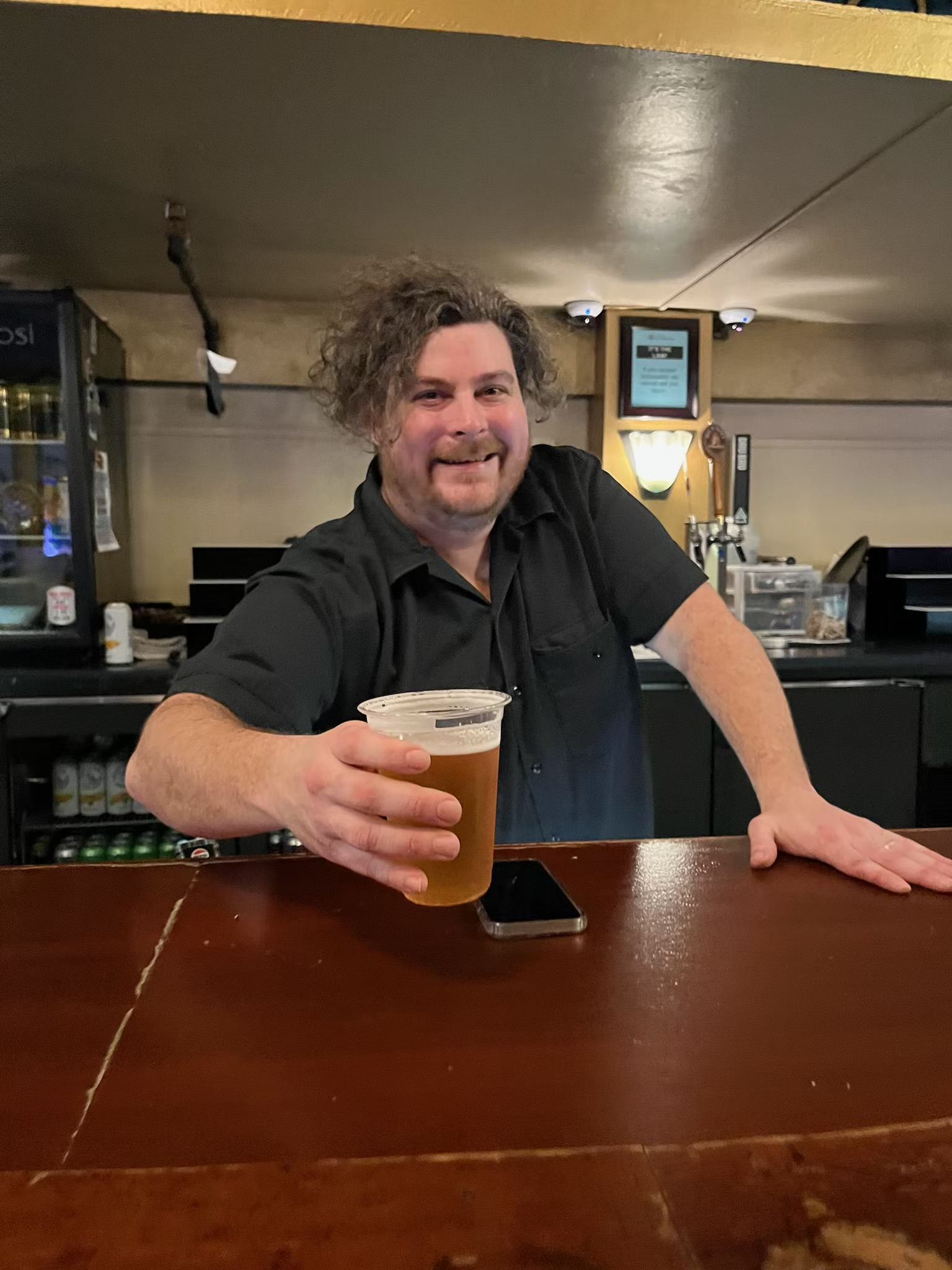
A bartender at the Neptune Theatre serves beer to a patron in 2026.

The "U-Neptune Theatre" was opened by the Puritan Theatre Company on November 16, 1921, featuring the silent movie Serenade and seating an audience of 1,000 people. The theater was built with a Kimball orchestral theater organ, which was removed in 1943.

By the end of the 1940s, the theater was renamed the Neptune, given a small renovation and changed ownership.

The theater went through several management changes during the coming decades, suffering from erratic bookings and poor equipment. It was kept afloat in the 1970s by showings of The Rocky Horror Picture Show, a cult classic film.

In 1981, the Neptune came under the ownership of the Landmark Theatres chain, which also owned the Harvard Exit Theatre in Seattle. The company renovated the theater with a new sound and projection system, hoping to bring out the venue's "long-sought potential". Landmark renovated the theater again in 1994, replacing seating and adding a Dolby Digital and Sony Dynamic Digital Sound system, along with a 16 mm film projector.

=== Rocky Horror ===
In 1991, the theater set a record by playing The Rocky Horror Picture Show every week for 14 years, longer than any other movie had played in Seattle. By 1993, it was one of four U.S. theaters which had played the show the longest, according to the National Rocky Horror Fan Club in New York, one of several U.S. theaters playing it in a midnight movie format.

=== Recent renovation ===
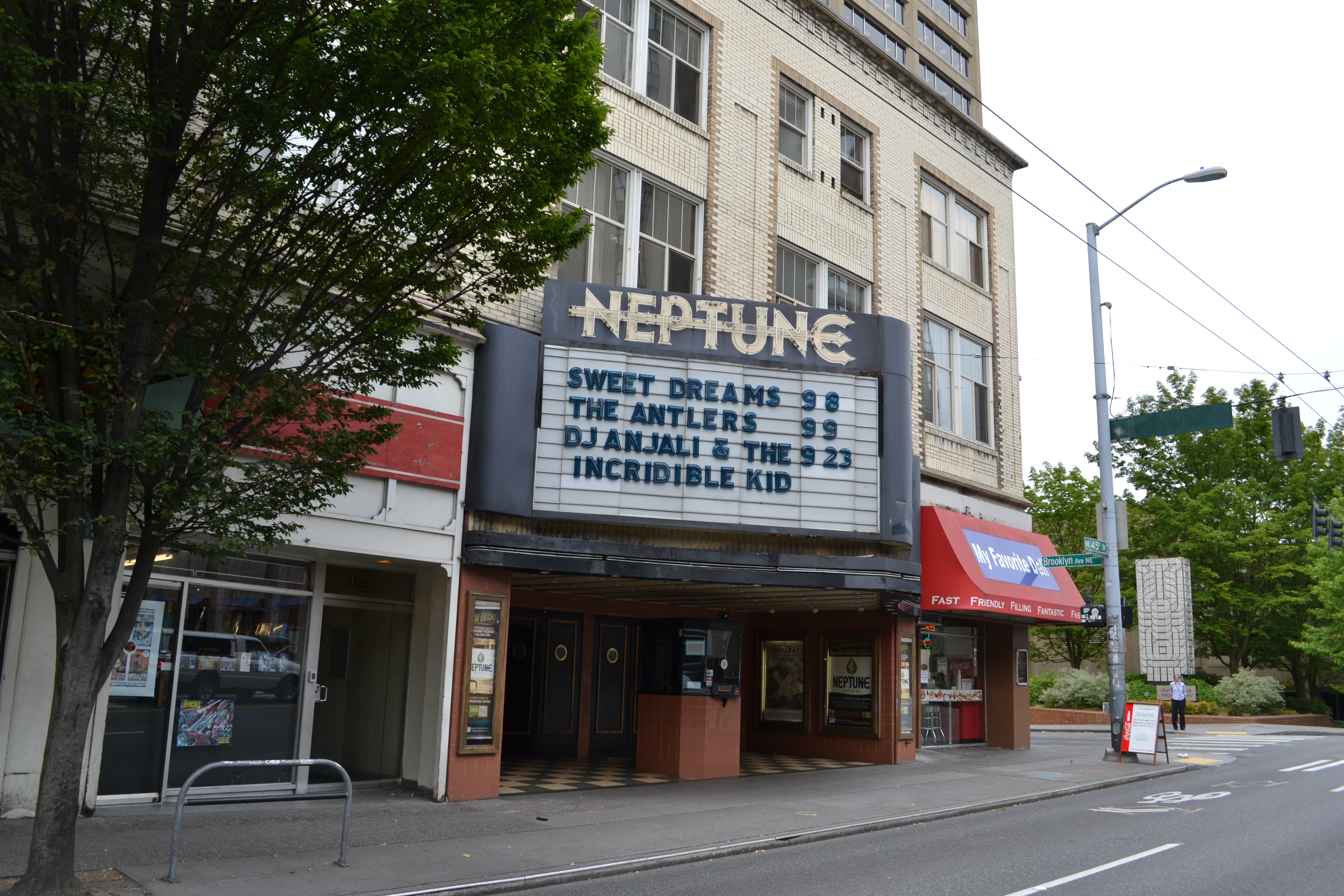
The theater's exterior in 2011

Landmark lost its lease in 2010 to the Seattle Theatre Group, a non-profit organization that also operates the Moore Theatre and Paramount Theatre.

The Neptune was closed for a $700,000 renovation in January 2011 and re-opened on September 25, 2011, becoming a performing arts and music venue in addition to a movie theater.

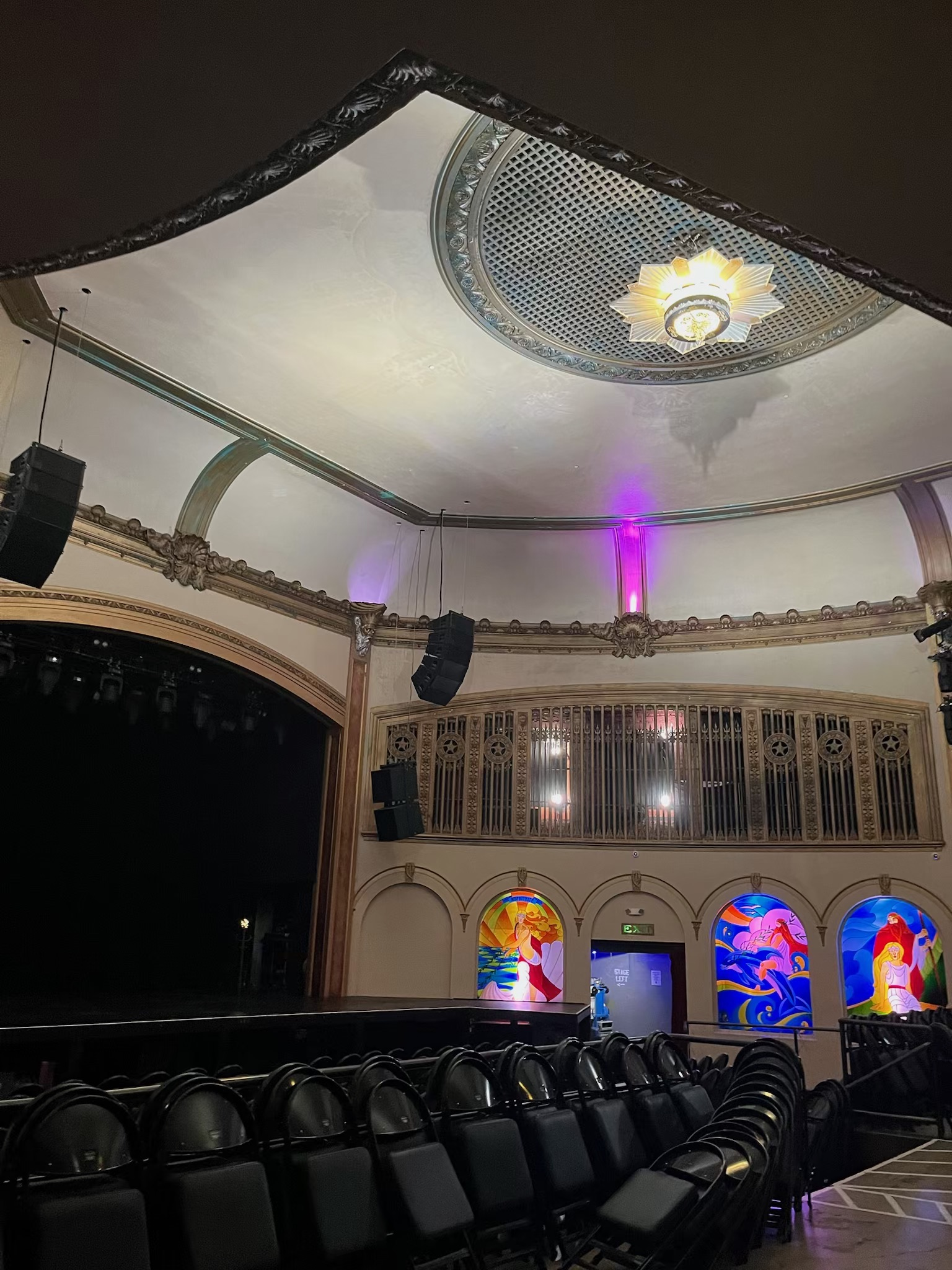
Neptune Theatre interior in February 2026.

The 2011 renovation saved the building from demolition for the adjoining U District Link light rail station on NE 45th Street. Sound Transit was forced to re-engineer the station to avoid the theater building, and to underpin the Neptune's foundation.

After the theater's 2011 renovation, its first act was Pacific Northwest musician Mark Lanegan at a soft opening in June; the official opening in September was marked by a screening of Rocky Horror.

The building was nominated to become a city landmark in 2012. The Seattle City Council passed an ordinance in 2014 designating the Neptune Building as a city landmark, levying certain protections on the property.

== See also ==
- Clinton Street Theater, a theatre in Portland, Oregon, also known for screening The Rocky Horror Picture Show
- The Rocky Horror Picture Show cult following
