= Bergen Place =

Park in Ballard, Seattle, Washington, U.S.

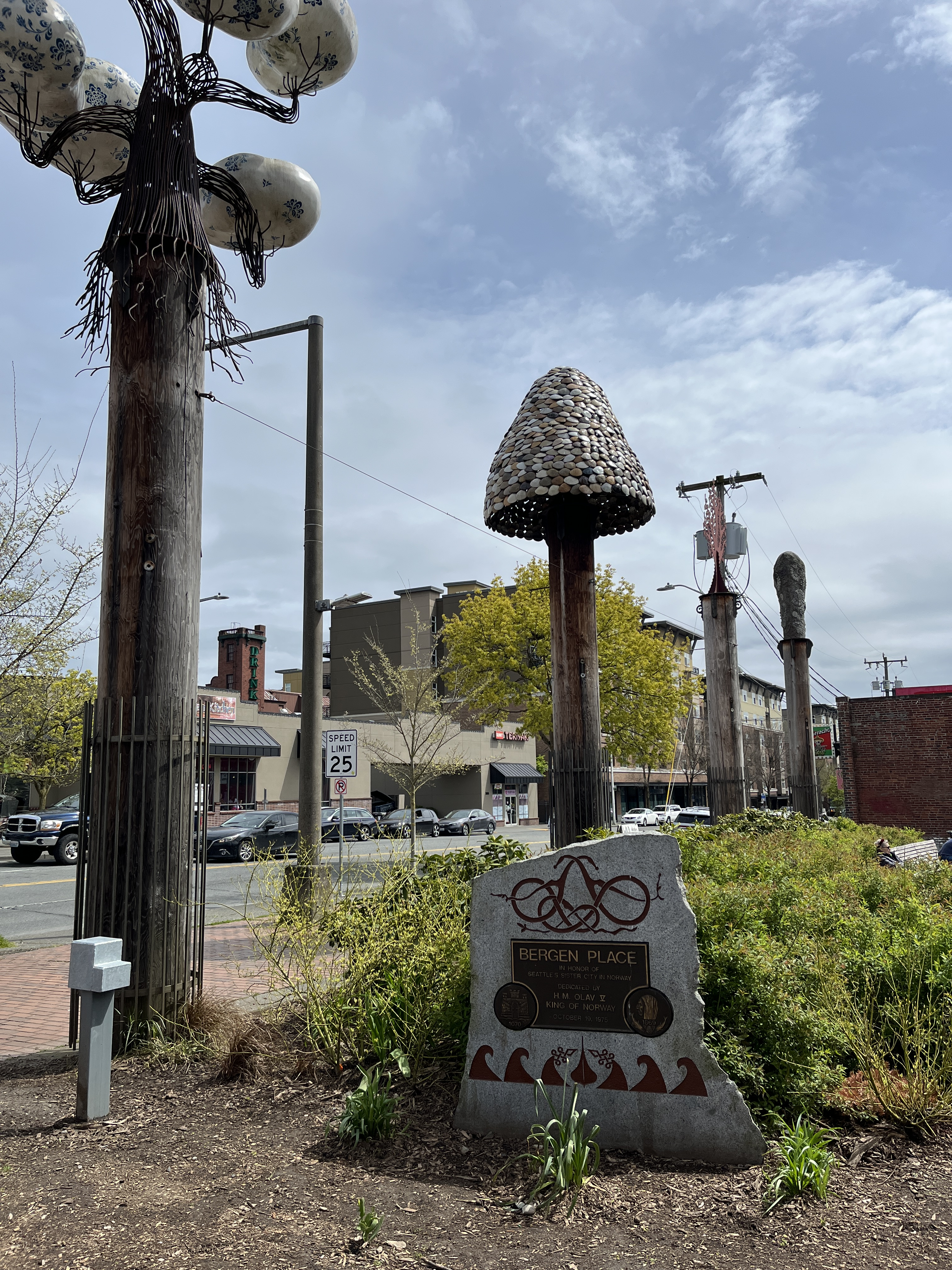
- The park in 2023
- Interactive map of Bergen Place
- Coordinates: 47.668°N 122.384°W

Bergen Place is a small, triangle-shaped public park in Seattle's Ballard neighborhood, in the U.S. state of Washington. Named after Bergen, Norway (one of Seattle's sister cities), the square is lined with benches and trees and features sculptures.

The park was inaugurated by King Olav V in 1975. It was redesigned in 2004. The park has also displayed a large menorah to commemorate Hanukkah.

A 1995 mural, created with support from the Ballard Historical Society, was vandalized in 2009.
