= Shilshole Bay =

Bay in Washington, United States

Coordinates: 47.678083°N 122.419787°W

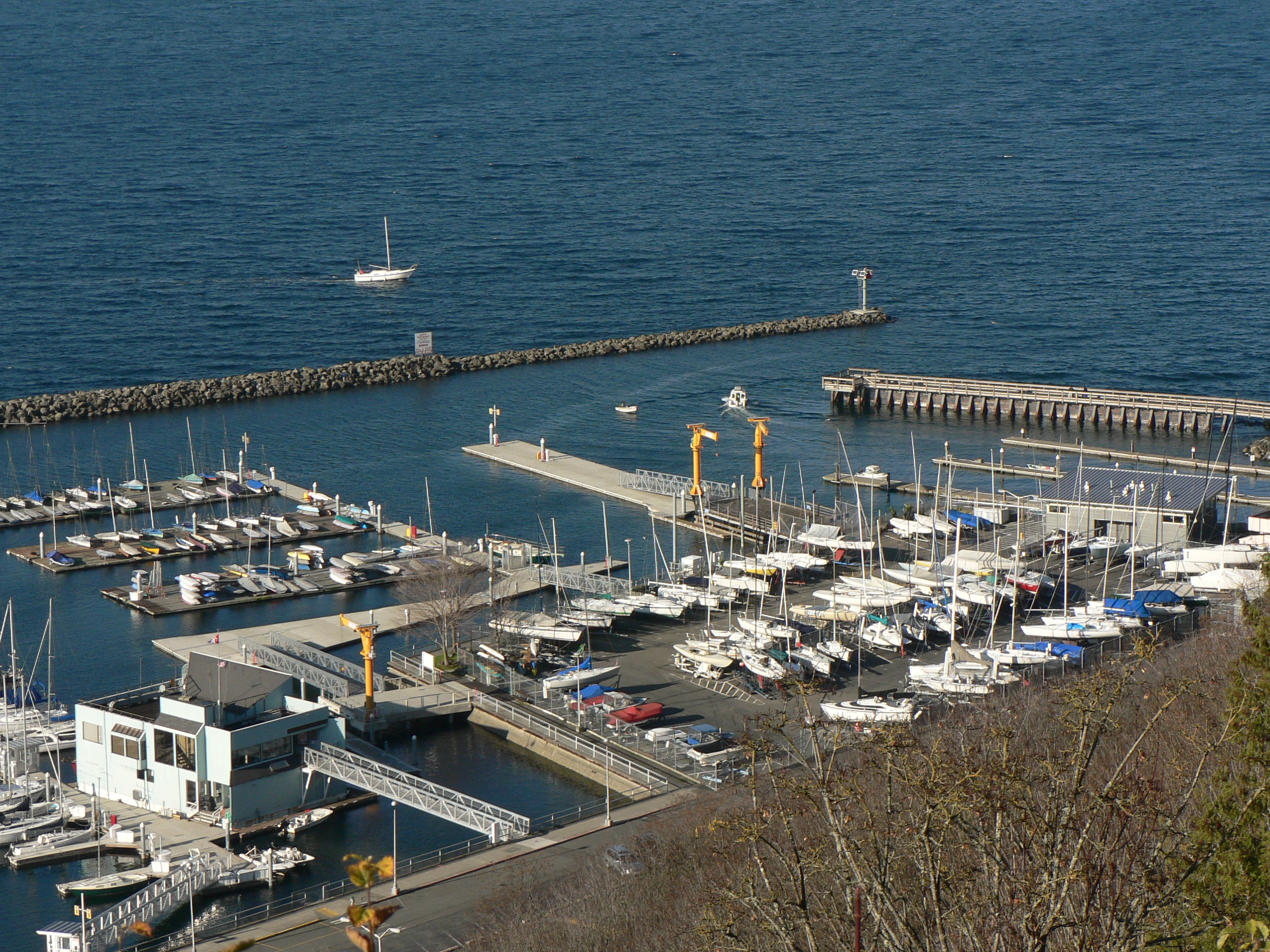
Shilshole Bay Marina

Shilshole Bay is the part of Puget Sound east of a line drawn northeasterly from Seattle's West Point in the southwest to its Golden Gardens Park in the northeast. On its shores lie Discovery Park, the Lawton Wood section of the Magnolia neighborhood, the neighborhood of Ballard, and Golden Gardens Park. It is home to the Shilshole Bay Marina on Ballard's Seaview Avenue N.W. and communicates with the Lake Washington Ship Canal via the Ballard Locks.

The name is derived from the Lushootseed word šilšul, which means "threading a needle," referring to Salmon Bay. The name comes from the extremely narrow passageway through which Salmon Bay flows into Shilshole Bay. The fact that Shilshole Bay is named "Shilshole" is a misnomer. The name šilšul only refers to Salmon Bay and the village inside it, however, English speakers applied the name "Shilshole" to the outside bay.
