= Ballard Brewery District =

Seattle attraction

Coordinates: 47.666°N 122.371°W

The Ballard Brewery District is a business cluster of beer breweries south of Northwest Market Street and generally between 8th Avenue Northwest and 15th Avenue Northwest, in the Ballard neighborhood of Seattle. The neighborhood has more breweries than any other neighborhood in Seattle.

== History ==
Redhook Ale Brewery opened a production facility in Ballard in 1981 or 1982, becoming the first company to start producing beer in the neighborhood. It moved to nearby Fremont in 1989.

The first brewery taproom that opened to the public in Ballard was Maritime Pacific, in 1990. By 2013, at least nine other breweries existed in the neighborhood, eight of which had opened since 2010. The breweries operate in coopetition with one another, distinguishing themselves by gimmicks and niche marketing. Hale's Ales, originally founded in 1983, opened a location in Ballard in 1995; it closed in 2022. The Brewery District is notably dense; in 2022, one writer was able to visit nine breweries in a 0.54-mile (870 m) pub crawl.

Reuben's Brews started operating a taproom in 2012; following its rapid rise in popularity, two more breweries opened nearby within the next eight months. By the summer of 2021, there were 11 breweries operating in the Brewery District, many with outdoor dining patios and food trucks, allowing them to remain open safely during local restrictions on indoor dining related to the COVID-19 pandemic. The Brewery District became a tourist attraction, featured in the New York Times. TripAdvisor mentioned tours of the Brewery District in its 2018 article naming Ballard one of the United States' 14 "coolest hipster neighborhoods".

As of October 2026, the Ballard Alliance, a local chamber of commerce, lists 14 breweries and cideries in the Brewery District.
