= Henderson Ryan =

American architect

- Born: January 16, 1856; Valhermoso Springs, Alabama
- Died: August 29, 1927 (aged 73); California
- Education: Agricultural and Mechanical College of Kentucky
- Occupation: Architect
- Buildings: Old Central, Ballard Carnegie Library, Neptune Theatre

Henderson Ryan (January 16, 1856 – August 29, 1927) was an American architect notable for designing buildings in Seattle, Washington, in the early 20th century, including several theaters and a significant number of residential apartment buildings. Among other buildings he was the architect of the Ballard Carnegie Library and Neptune Theatre, both Seattle city landmarks.
