= Valhermoso Springs, Alabama =

- Unincorporated community
- Location within Alabama Location within the United States
- Coordinates: 34.50120°N 86.68582°W
- Country: United States
- State: Alabama
- County: Morgan
- Elevation: 665 ft (202.7 m)
- Time zone: UTC−6 (Central (CST))
  - Summer (DST): UTC−5 (CDT)
- ZIP code: 35775
- Area codes: 256 & 938
- GNIS feature ID: 153825

Valhermoso Springs is an unincorporated community in Morgan County, Alabama, United States. Valhermoso Springs is located on Alabama State Route 36, 6.7 miles (10.8 km) east-northeast of Somerville. Valhermoso Springs has a post office with ZIP code 35775.

== 2020 mass shooting ==
On June 4, 2020, police received 9-1-1 calls about shots being fired at Talucah Road. Upon responding, they found a house on fire. When the flames were extinguished, the bodies of three females, four males, and a dog were discovered; all of them had suffered gunshot wounds. Police announced the incident was a targeted attack, and by the next day, all seven victims were identified. On June 22, two accused suspects, John Michael Legg, 19, and Frederic Allen Rogers, 22, were arrested in a silver Dodge Charger in Stayton, Oregon, 15 miles (24 km) southeast of Salem, during a traffic stop, and both face capital murder charges. Legg and Rogers were allegedly motivated by an internal dispute in a club in which they and three of the victims were members. In September 2024, Rogers was sentenced to life in prison. In December 2024, Legg was sentenced to life imprisonment without parole. Rogers is currently housed at the St. Clair Correctional Facility.

== Notable people ==
- Henderson Ryan, early 20th century architect in Seattle
- Al Williams, former Major League Baseball player for the Philadelphia Athletics
