= Paramount Theatre (Seattle) =

Performance hall in Seattle, Washington

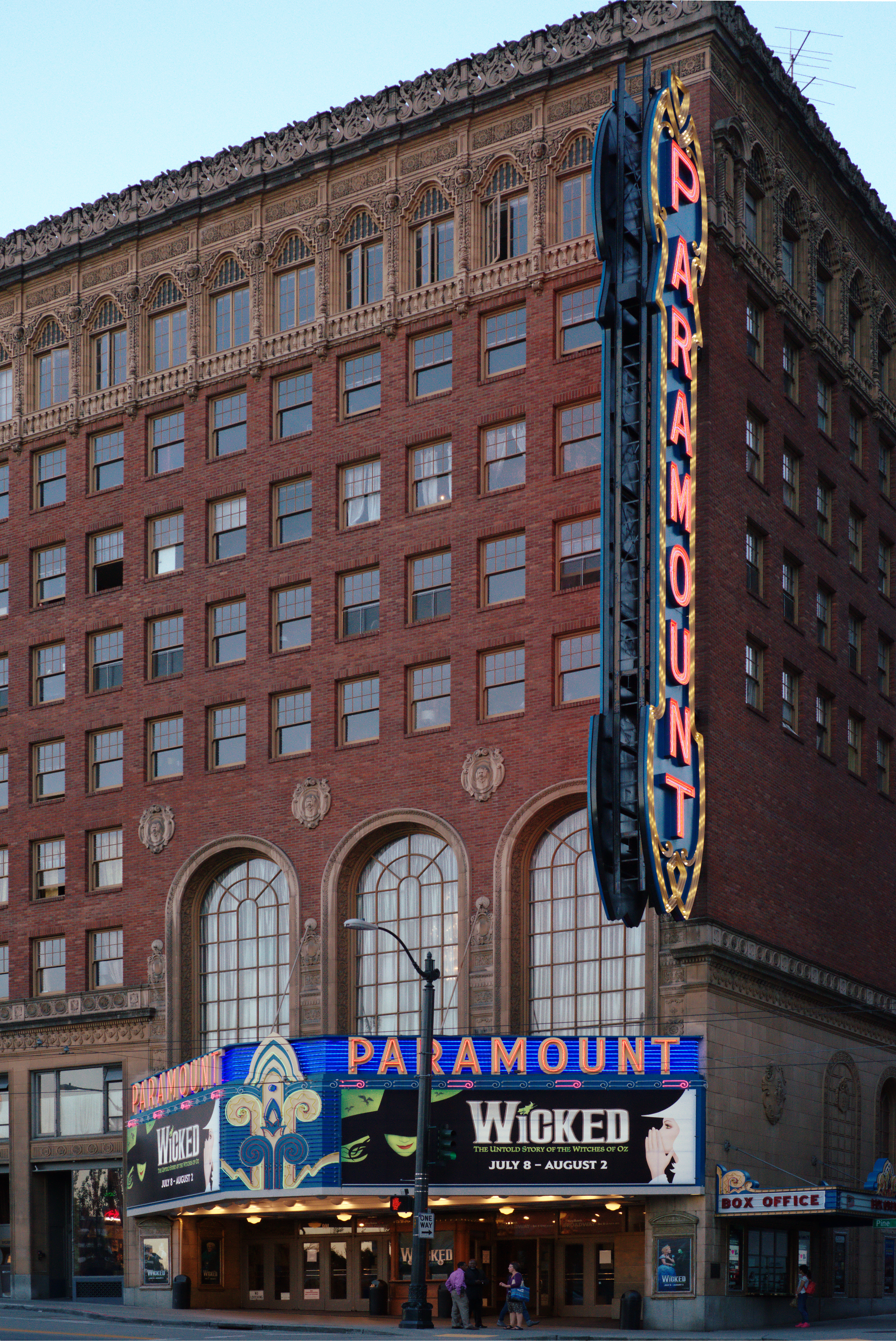
- The Paramount Theatre in 2015
- Interactive map of Paramount Theatre
- Address: 901 Pine Street; Seattle, Washington; 98101
- Coordinates: 47°36′47″N 122°19′53″W
- Paramount Theatre
- U.S. National Register of Historic Places
- Seattle Landmark
- Location within Downtown Seattle Location within Washington (state) Location within the United States
- Architect: Rapp & Rapp; B. Marcus Priteca
- NRHP reference No.: 74001959

Significant dates
- Added to NRHP: October 19, 1974
- Designated SEATL: February 13, 1995
- Capacity: 2,807

Construction
- Opened: March 1, 1928

Website
- www.stgpresents.org

The Paramount Theatre is a 2,807-seat performing arts venue located at 9th Avenue and Pine Street in the downtown core of Seattle, Washington, United States. The theater originally opened on March 1, 1928, as the Seattle Theatre, with 3,000 seats. It was placed on the National Register of Historic Places on October 9, 1974, and has also been designated a City of Seattle landmark.

The Paramount is owned and operated by the Seattle Theatre Group, a 501(c)(3) not-for-profit performing arts organization which also runs the 1,768-seat Moore Theatre in Belltown, the 5th Avenue Theater Downtown, and the Neptune Theatre in the University District. Initially it was built expressly for showing film and secondarily, vaudeville. It then spent a period being used for live music. As of 2026, the Paramount is operated as a venue for various performing arts, serving its patron base with Broadway musical theatre, concerts, dance, comedy, family engagements, silent film and jazz. It is one of the busiest theatres in the region.

== History ==
During the 1920s, particularly before the first sound films, or "talkies", were invented in 1927, vaudeville and silent movies were the dominant form of national and local entertainment. Seattle alone had more than 50 movie palaces, the finest grouped together on 2nd Avenue. To achieve the broadest possible distribution of its films, Hollywood-based Paramount Pictures constructed a grand movie palace in practically every major city in the country, many erected between 1926 and 1928. In late 1926 or early 1927, Paramount Pictures decided to build in Seattle.

Led by its president, movie magnate Adolph Zukor, Paramount Pictures invested nearly $3 million for construction. It hired Rapp & Rapp, a Chicago-based architectural firm, to design the theatre building. Seattle resident B. Marcus Priteca, an established architect of movie palaces in the 1920s, designed the building's adjacent apartments and office suites.

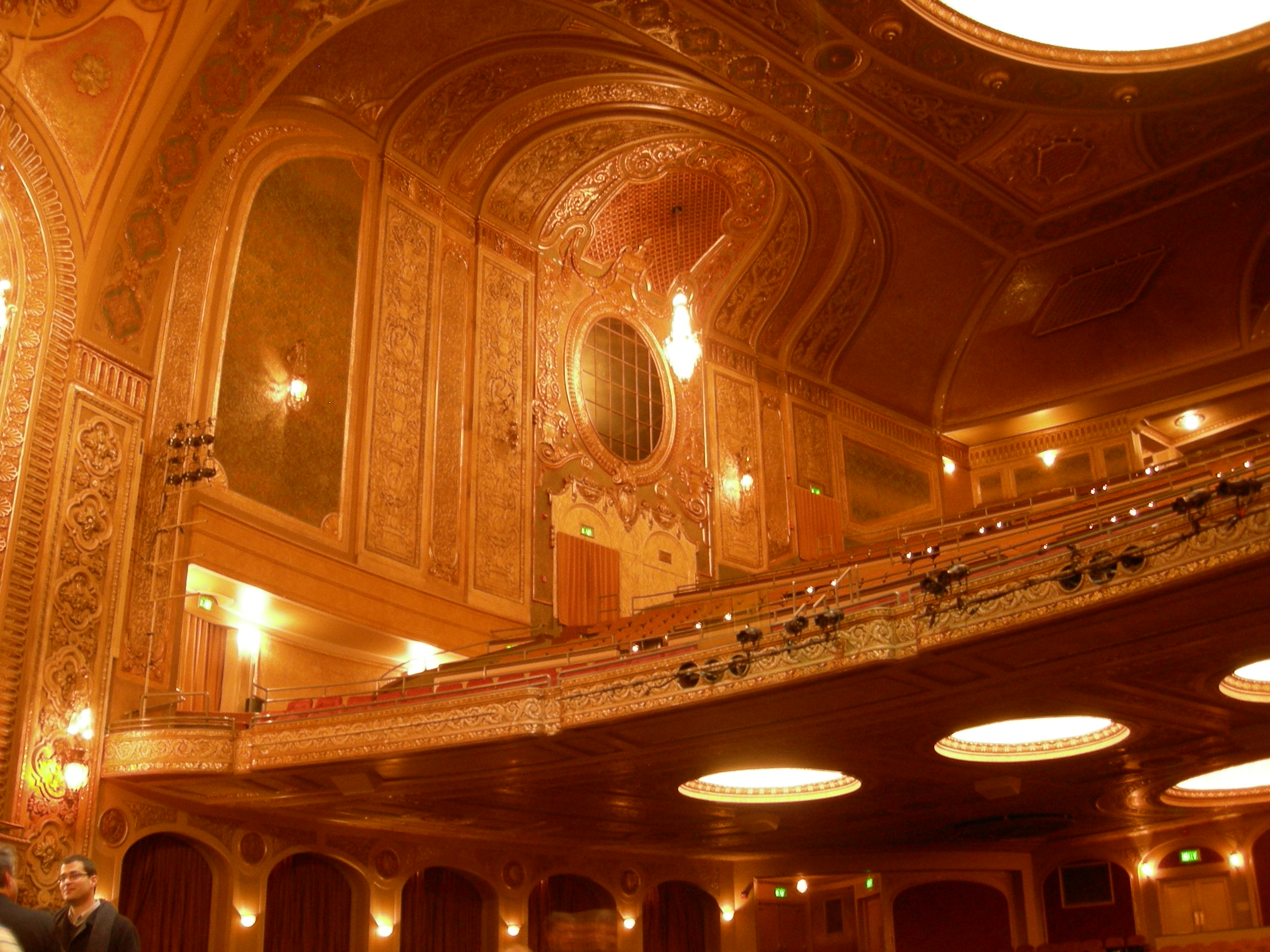
Interior and balcony of Paramount Theatre

The Paramount Theatre is the first venue in the United States to have a convertible floor system, which converts the theater to a ballroom. Therefore, the maximum concert capacity can hold up to 3,000 fans with the main floor serving as an unreserved standing room area while keeping the seats in the balcony regardless of either a 2,807-seated theater or a general admission event by separated levels.

The Paramount Theatre has an original installation of the Wurlitzer theatre pipe organ. The organ is a 4 manual/21 rank Publix 1 (opus #1819) style organ configured for installation in three chambers and is one of only three remaining original organs of this style. Between May, 2017 and March, 2018, the console was rebuilt off site by the Crome Organ Company. The organ is presently maintained by a group of volunteers from the Puget Sound Theatre Organ Society.

It was renamed from Seattle Theater to the Paramount in 1930. It was renamed the Paramount Northwest in 1971. In 1993, it was purchased by Ida Cole, a former Microsoft vice-president, and closed for repairs in May 1994. It reopened as the Paramount Theatre on March 17, 1995. In 2002, ownership of the Paramount Theatre was transferred to the not-for-profit Seattle Theatre Group (STG)

On October 31, 1991, Nirvana played a concert at the Paramount that would later become the bands highest quality show, recorded in 16 mm film and the live album Live at the Paramount (video).

In 2009, the Paramount received a new sign out front. The 1940s Paramount sign originally used 1,970 incandescent bulbs, which were eventually replaced by 11-watt fluorescents. The new sign is a replica of the original iconic sign, but uses LED lights.

The Paramount Theatre was also used to hold televised auditions for the sixth season of America's Got Talent.

The theater was opened as a "Hemp house" but was converted to a Counterweight rigging system

== See also ==
- 5th Avenue Theatre, Seattle's other theater producing Broadway musicals
- SIFF (Seattle International Film Festival), an Independent local theater chain.
