= The Majestic Bay =

Movie theater in Seattle, Washington, United States

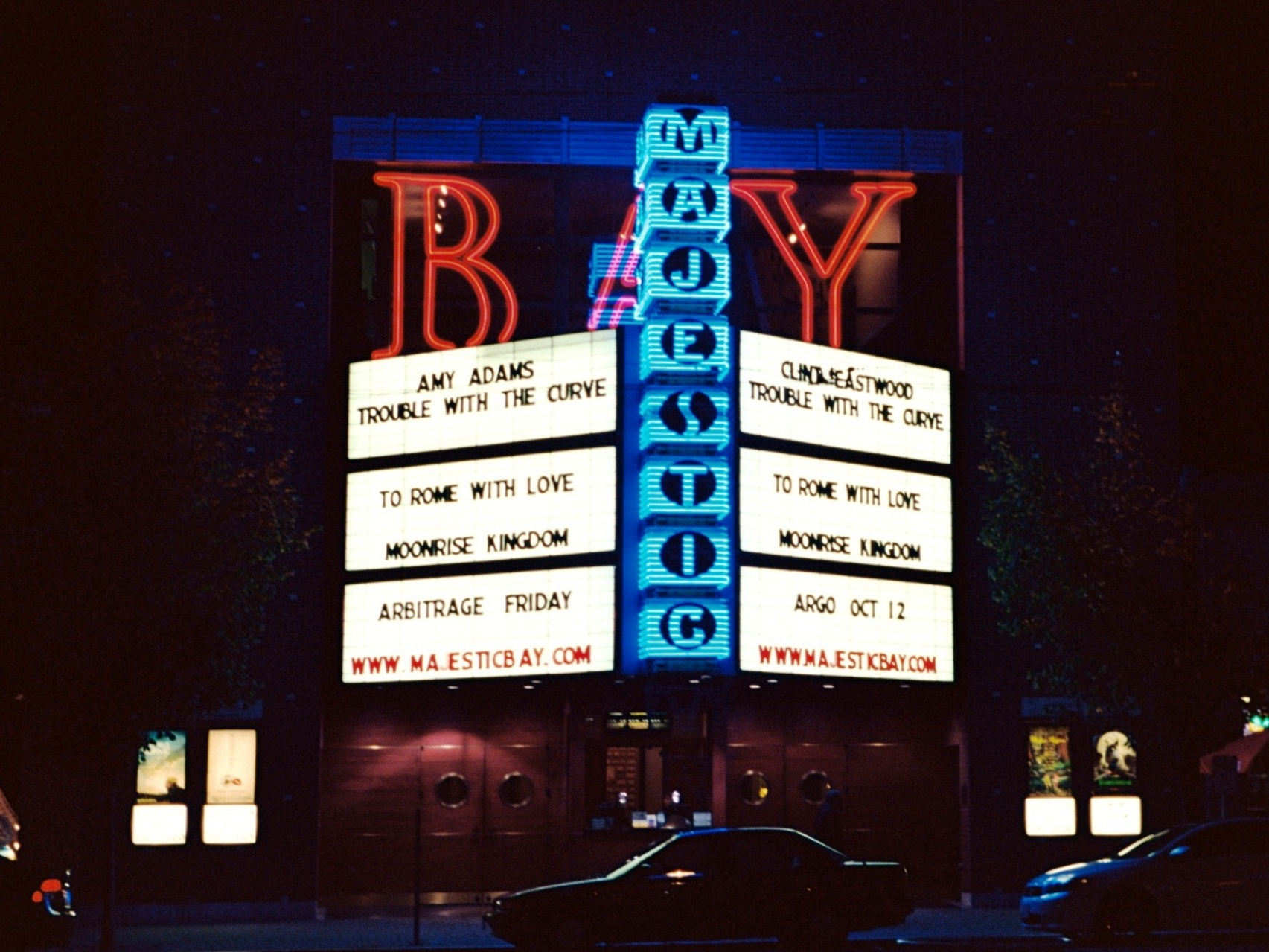
- Interactive map of The Majestic Bay
- Address: 2044 NW Market Street; Seattle; USA
- Coordinates: 47.668976°N 122.38408°W
- Owner: Kenny Alhadeff, Elltaes Theatres LLC
- Type: Movie theater

Construction
- Opened: 1914; 112 years ago

Website
- majesticbay.com

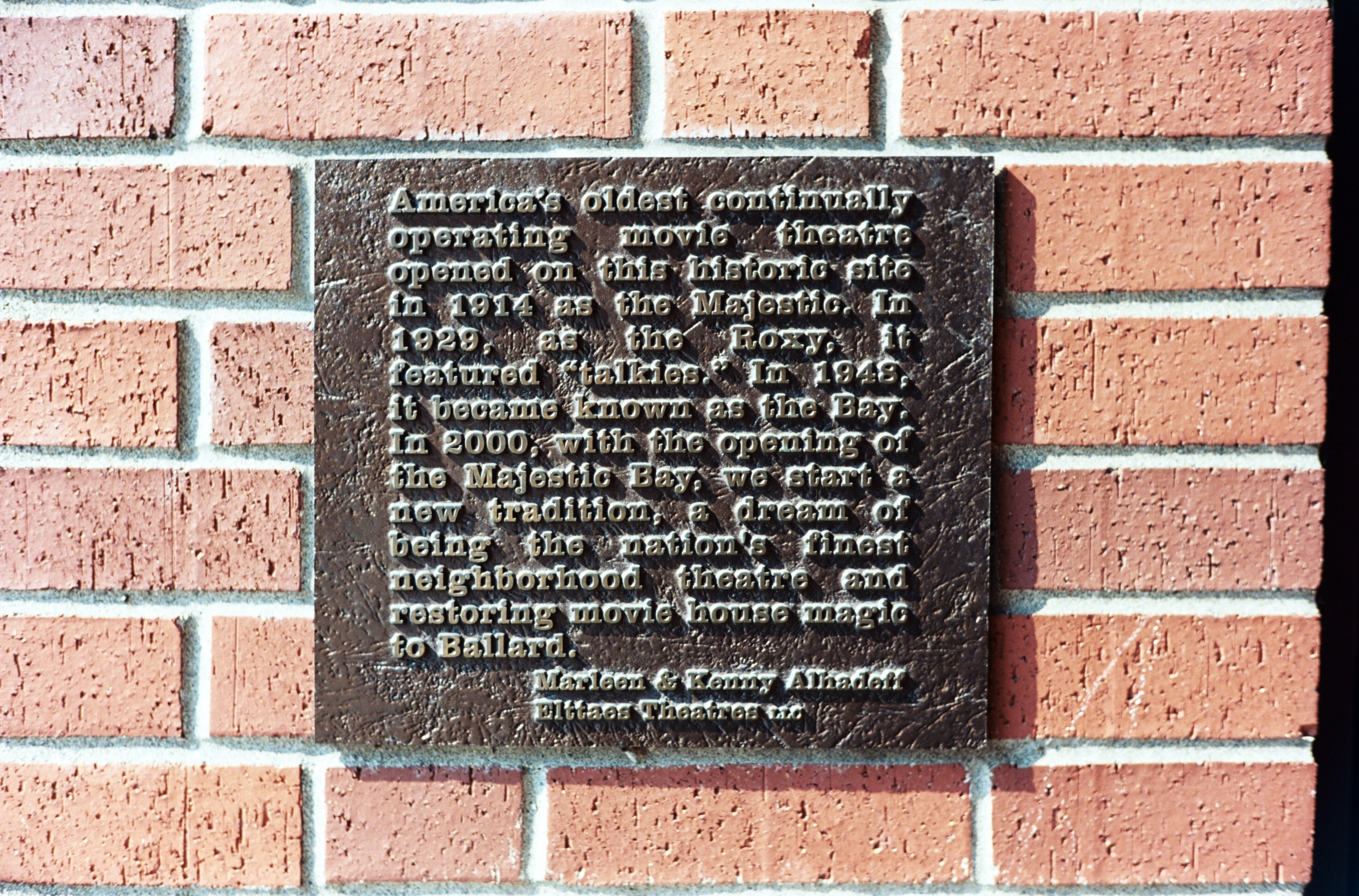
Plaque describing the Majestic Bay as "America's oldest continuously operating movie theatre", dating to 1914

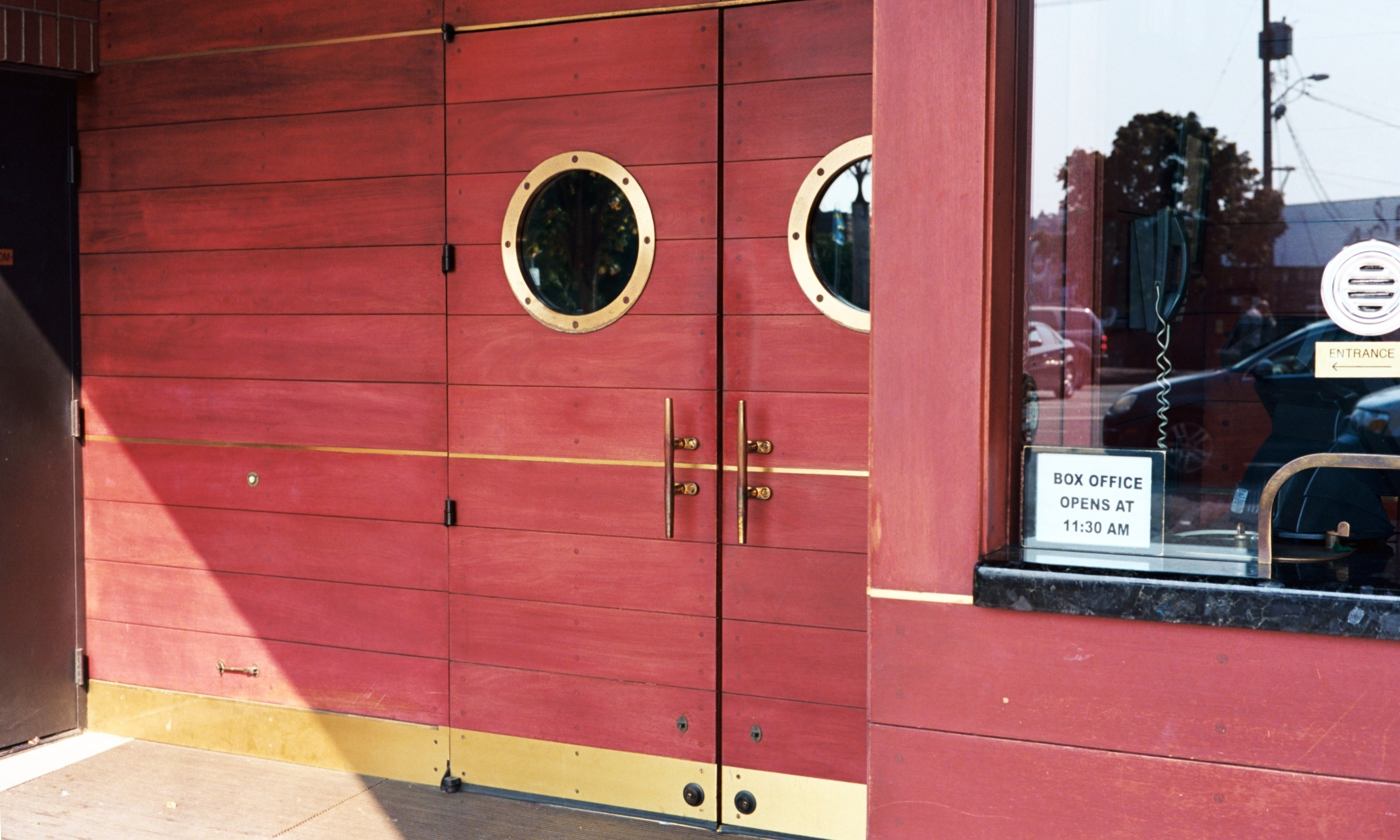
Nautical styled doors

The Majestic Bay Theatre, built in 1914 in the Ballard neighborhood of Seattle, Washington, was the oldest continuously operating movie theater in the United States prior to its closure in 1997. In 1998, it was renovated and transformed from a bargain single-screen theater to a well-appointed triplex.

The theater opened as The Majestic in 1914. It was renamed The Bay at a later date until the closure. It operated as a Disney outlet in and around the 1970s, running all of the major Disney features, as well as other non-Disney fare.

A cigarette dropped in a standpipe in the adjacent parking lot started a fire in its East wall (just before a showing) in 1970 and could have been the theater's end had it happened when the theater was unoccupied, but the fire was quickly and successfully put out by the Ballard fire department before any significant damage occurred. The Bay Theater was again open for the next showing.

The rebuilt theater of 1998 adopted both the former "Majestic" and its later "Bay" names to become the "Majestic Bay Theatre".
