= Golden Gardens Park =

Park in Seattle, Washington, U.S.

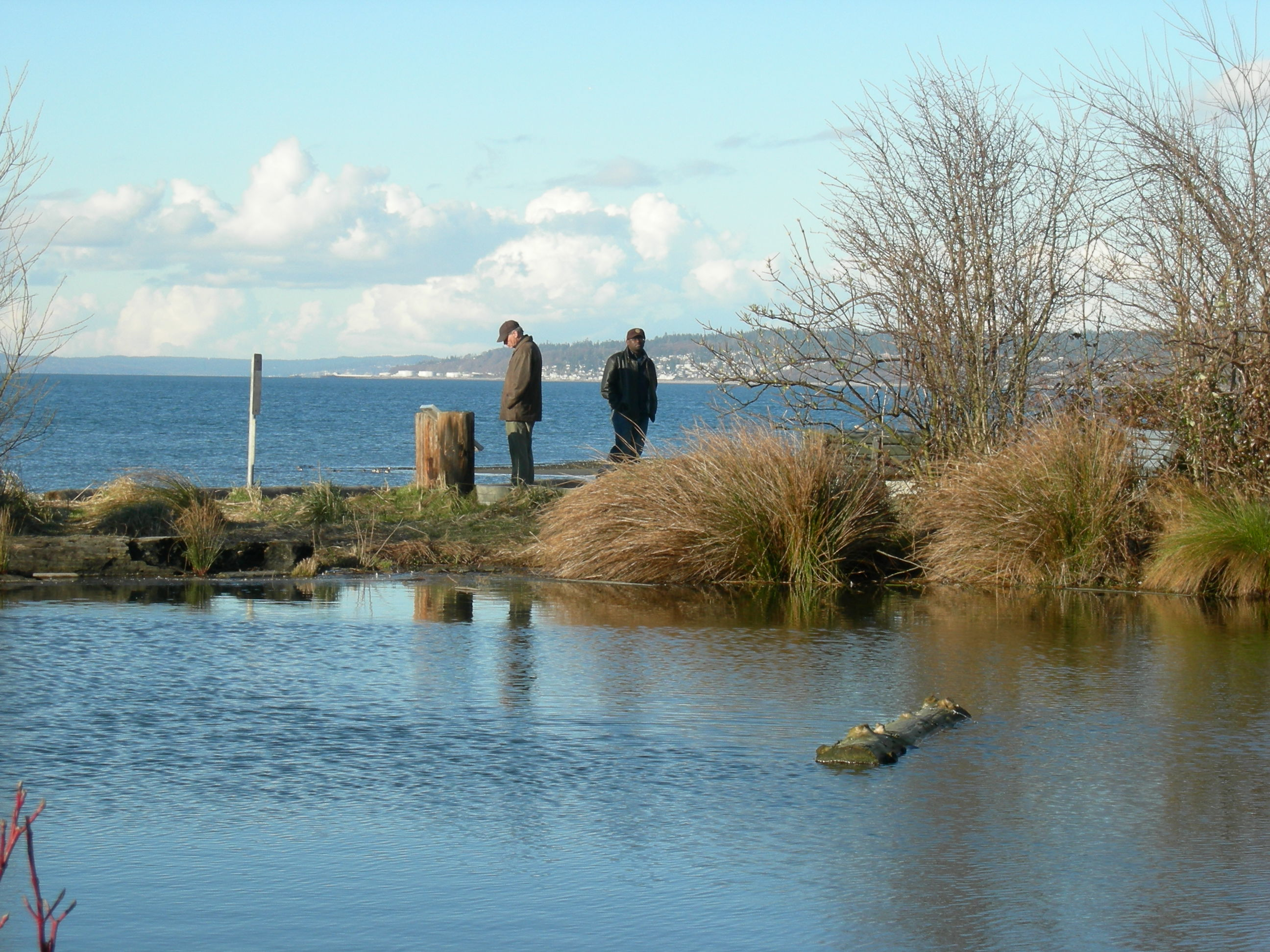
- A freshwater marsh near the north end of the park, with Puget Sound in the background.
- Interactive map of Golden Gardens Park
- Location: Seattle, Washington
- Coordinates: 47°41′33″N 122°24′12″W
- Area: 87.8 acres (35.5 ha)
- Operator: Seattle Parks and Recreation
- Open: 6 a.m. - 11:30 p.m. daily

Golden Gardens Park is a public park in Ballard, a neighborhood of Seattle, Washington. The park includes wetlands, beaches, hiking trails, and picnic and playground areas. The park's bathhouse was designated a historic landmark by the City of Seattle in 2005.

== Landmarks ==
The park's bathhouse was designated a historic landmark by the City of Seattle in 2005.

== Recreation ==
The lower portion of the park is divided between wetland marsh and beach (on Puget Sound), and situated north of the Shilshole Bay Marina. It also has dunes and large grassy areas. Golden Gardens has exceptional views of Puget Sound and the Olympic Mountains across the sound. The water is very cold for swimming even in summers. Sailing, kayaking, and canoeing are popular. Kitesurfing and sailboarding and other wind-driven sports are also common. The Sound is cut off from the open ocean for more than a hundred miles, sheltering the park from severe weather.

The park is also host to fire pits, picnic areas, a play area, a basketball court, and walking and hiking paths.

== Nature ==
Golden Gardens is well known for the birds that live or migrate there:

- Mallard ducks in the wetlands
- Red-winged blackbirds in the marshes
- Canada geese are seen in the parking lot and near picnic areas
- Wood ducks make occasional appearances
- Bald Eagles commonly occur here
- Glaucous-winged Gulls are common
- Anna's hummingbirds can often be seen on the trees near the ponds.

The mallards and Canada geese are habituated to humans, and have been known to attack visitors. California sea lions are often heard, and Harbor Seals are also commonly seen. Red-eared slider turtles can be seen sunning themselves on the logs in the ponds. Beavers are active at the ponds, they have cut down a lot of the alder trees around the ponds. Musk rats can often be seen swimming in the ponds. Orcas sometimes swim near the beach.

== Motorsport ==
The double switchback road that leads up from Golden Gardens Park was used as a special Seattle demonstration stage for the 1987 Olympus Pro Rally. Cars were staged from the Shilshole Bay Marina parking area (Seaview Avenue) and finished at the top of the ridge on Golden Gardens Drive. The demonstration stage was the opening chapter in the Olympus Rally's international campaign to achieve FIA World Rally Championship status for the rally. Olympus was added to the FIA Rally Championship calendar in 1986 as the United States sole World Championship Rally event. It is the only professional rally stage and the only professional motor sport event ever held within the city limits of Seattle.
