= Ballard Carnegie Library =

Library in Seattle, Washington, U.S.

- U.S. National Register of Historic Places
- Seattle Landmark
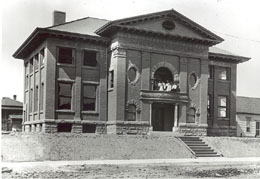
- Ballard Carnegie Library, c. 1911
- Location: 2026 NW Market Street; Ballard, Seattle, Washington, U.S.
- Coordinates: 47°40′8″N 122°23′0″W
- Built: 1904
- Architect: Henderson Ryan
- MPS: Carnegie Libraries of Washington TR (AD)
- NRHP reference No.: 79002535
- Added to NRHP: June 15, 1979

The Ballard Carnegie Library is a historic Carnegie library in the Ballard neighborhood of Seattle, Washington, United States. The institution was preceded by a freeholders' library in the 1860s, which was eventually replaced in 1901 by a reading room organized and funded by a women's group. Various funds including a $15,000 grant were used to create a new library for Ballard, then an independent city. The library opened to the public on June 24, 1904. It was the first major branch of the Seattle public library system after Ballard was annexed by Seattle in 1907, and also employed one of the first African American librarians in Seattle.

The Ballard Carnegie Library remained in use until 1963, when a newer and more modern facility replaced it. After its sale, the old library building housed a variety of private commercial enterprises, including an antique shop, a restaurant and a kilt manufacturer. In 1976 it was nominated for inclusion on the National Register of Historic Places by Seattle architect Larry E. Johnson, and formally added to the list in 1979.

== History ==
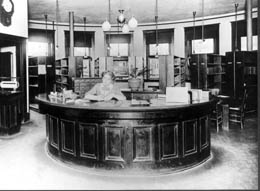
The library's check-out desk, c. 1907

In the late 1860s, when Ballard was a new settlement along the edge of Salmon Bay, a homesteader named Ira Wilcox Utter helped create a freeholders' library. In 1901, the Women's Christian Temperance Union of Ballard began raising money with fairs and socials for a new reading room on Ballard Avenue, which was moved and expanded several times. Having decided to build a proper library, the Ballard City Council established a library board in 1903 and applied to the philanthropist Andrew Carnegie for a grant to help underwrite the construction costs.

The library was built on a lot of 100 feet (30.5 m) square, which was purchased for $2,100. The costs for the building were raised by local businesses and citizens, with support from the earlier fundraising and book collections of the women's union and a $15,000 grant from Carnegie. When construction was completed, the building included facilities such as a 500-seat auditorium and a men's smoking room (the latter of which was later converted into a reading room). Part of the construction work was done by a chain gang.

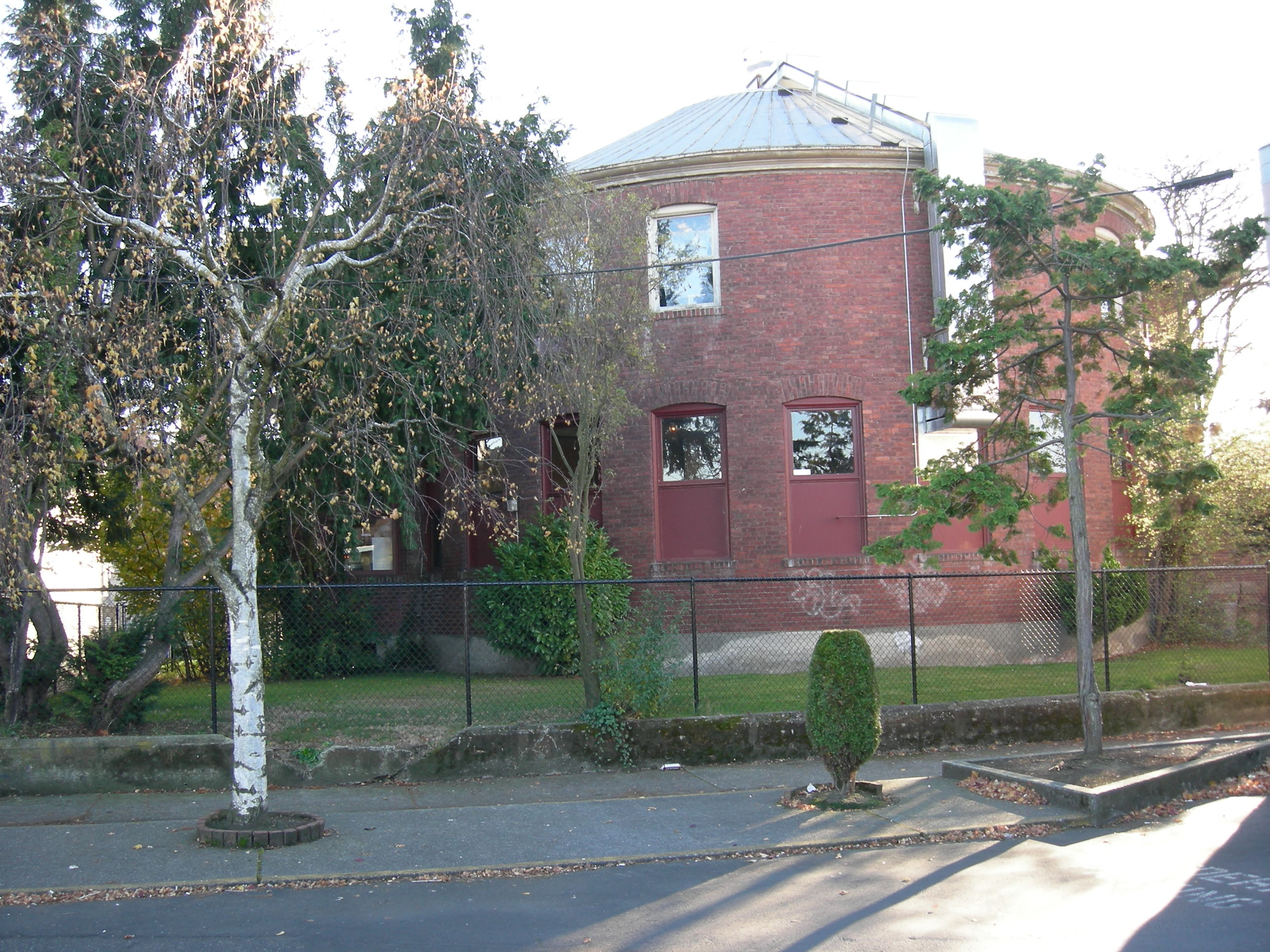
Rear of the library in 2007

Initially, the library had a cache of books provided by local residents and schools on standby for the completion and grand opening, as Carnegie's grant did not cover the initial costs of new books. An appeal was made to citizens to donate books and expand the collection. In 1907, the Seattle Public Library took control of the Carnegie library, when Ballard was annexed by the neighboring city. Early Scandinavian immigrants to the region made up a large proportion of the new facility's users (the Ballard area is noted for its significant historical presence of Scandinavian people). Early in the library's existence, it had a turnstile at the entrance to its book stacks, to count the number of book borrowers that passed through.

Following the start of World War I, the Carnegie Library became the location of various community activities, such as the distribution of information on the ongoing war. It also hosted Red Cross and English language classes. In 1942, during World War II, one of the first African American librarians in Seattle, Lucille Smith, was assigned to the library.

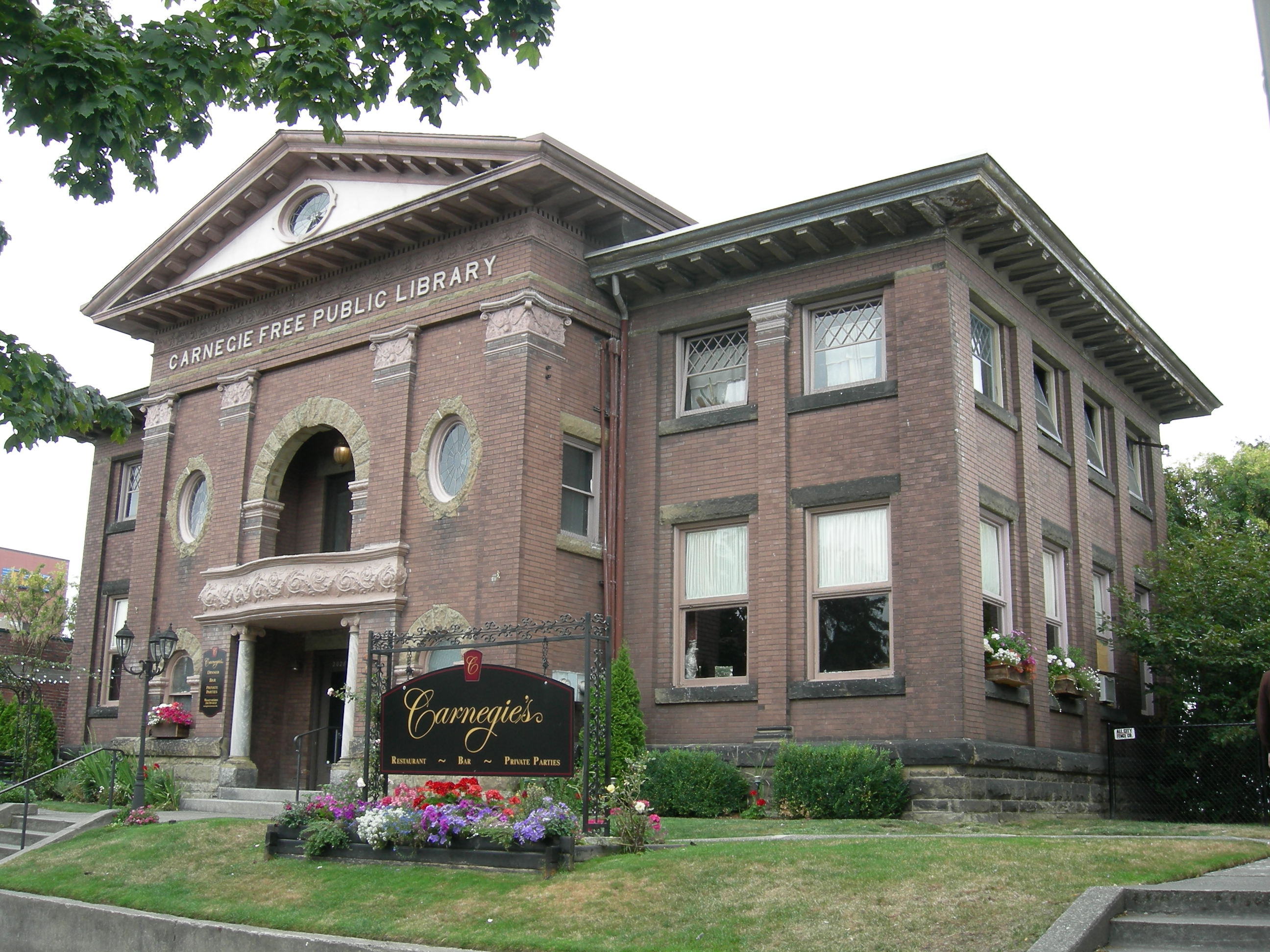
Entrance to the library in 2007

In 1956, Seattle voters approved a municipal bond to replace what was by then considered the "inadequate and impractical" library. The Ballard Carnegie Library was closed in 1963, when a new and larger public library was built in the area. The former library became an antique store. One of the cited reasons for the closure and sale of the library building was a number of expert claims that the building would not be able to withstand earthquakes (which have taken place in the Seattle area at numerous points in its history; the building has in fact survived several quakes in the meantime).

From 2003 to 2010 the old library building was home to Carnegie's, a French restaurant. Other businesses it has been home to during the 21st century include Ström and Ström Consulting, offering legal and marketing services to mental health professionals; and Root Integrative Health, a holistic wellness center. The building is currently owned by Karoline Morrison and her husband, Dennis Beals, and has been occupied by the Kangaroo and Kiwi Pub since 2012.

At the public meeting held on November 7, 2012, the City of Seattle's Landmarks Preservation Board voted to approve designation of the Ballard Carnegie Free Public Library as a Seattle Landmark.

== See also ==
- List of Carnegie libraries in the United States
