= Ballard, Seattle =

Neighborhood in Seattle, Washington

Ballard
- Neighborhood
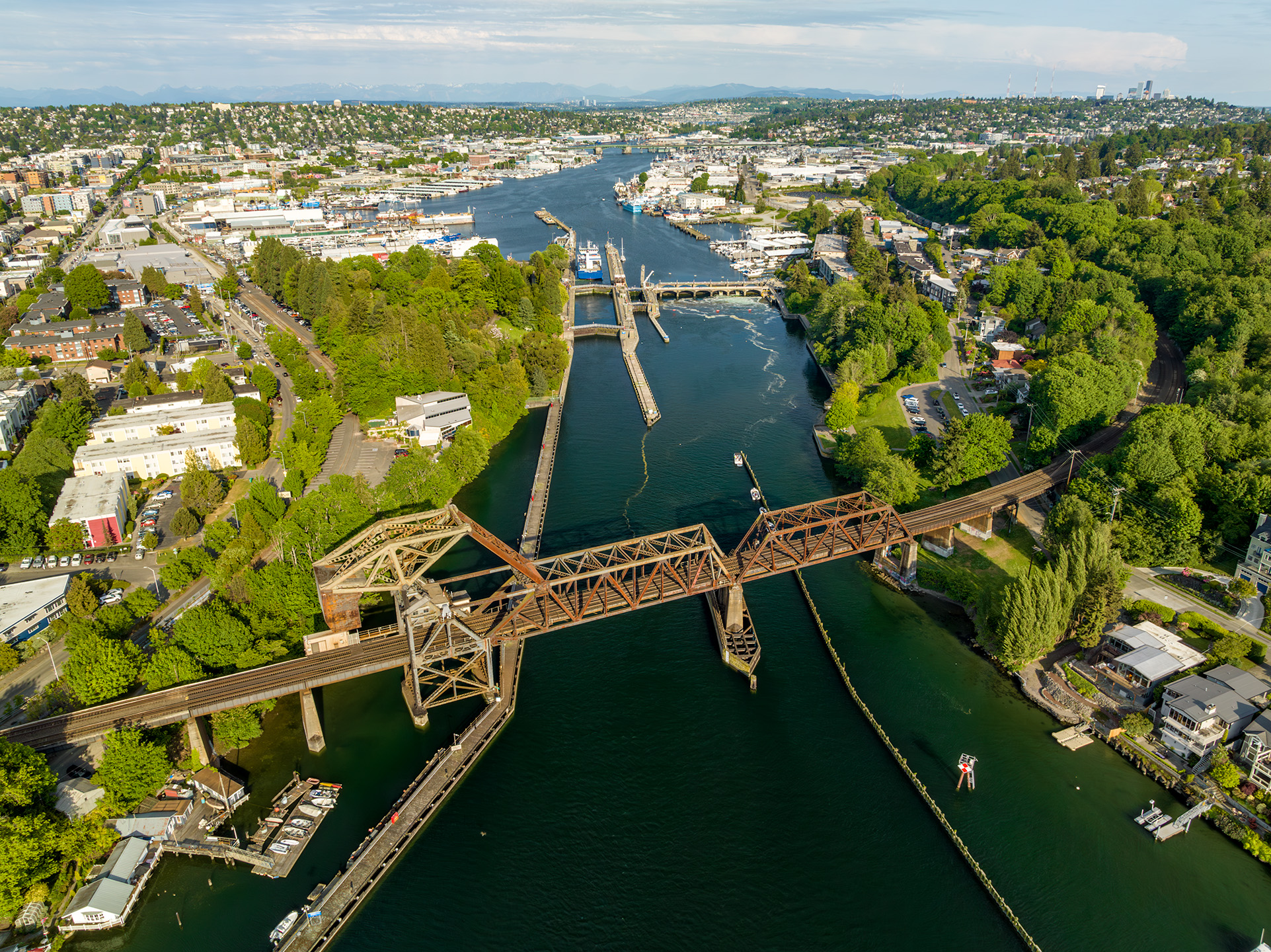
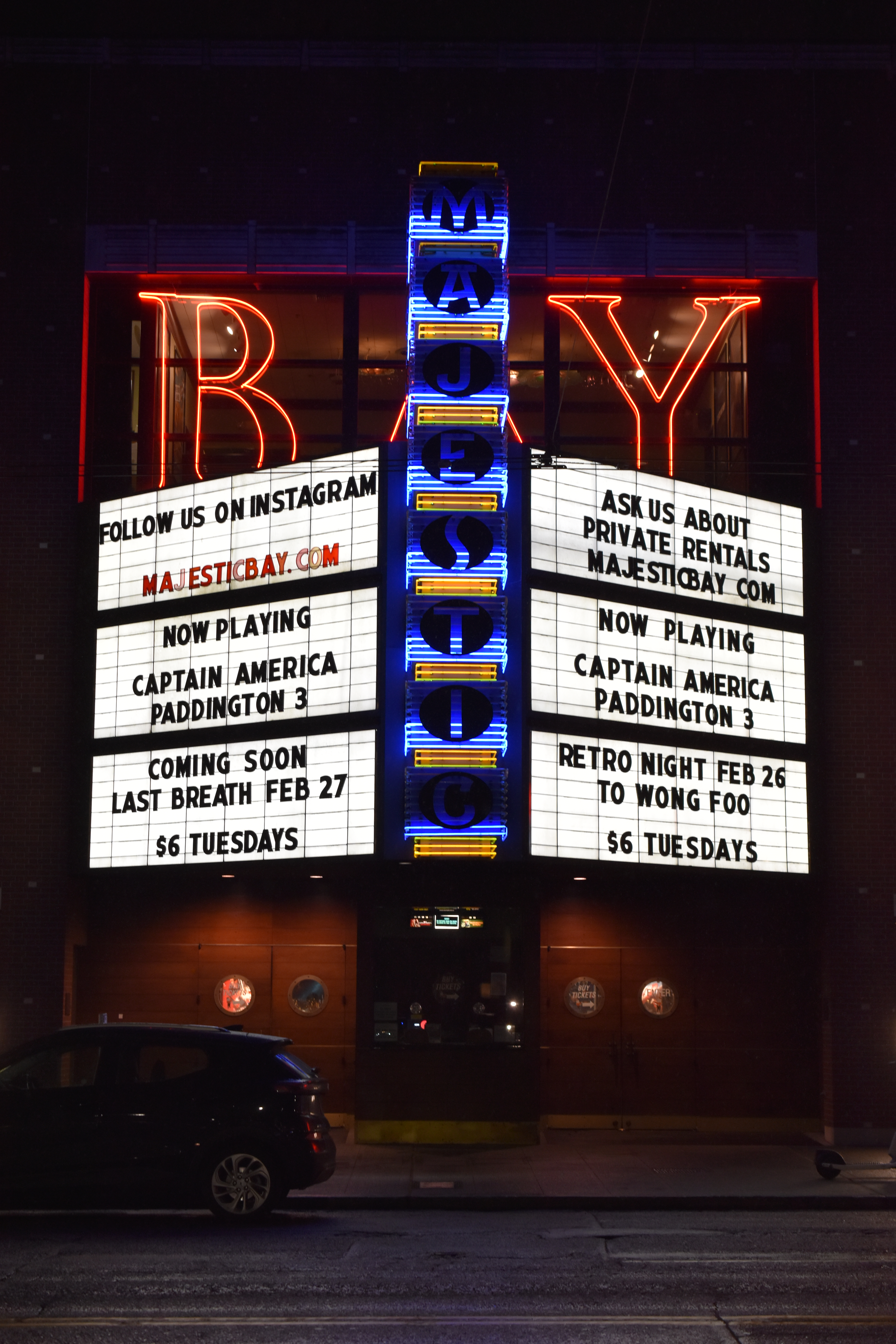
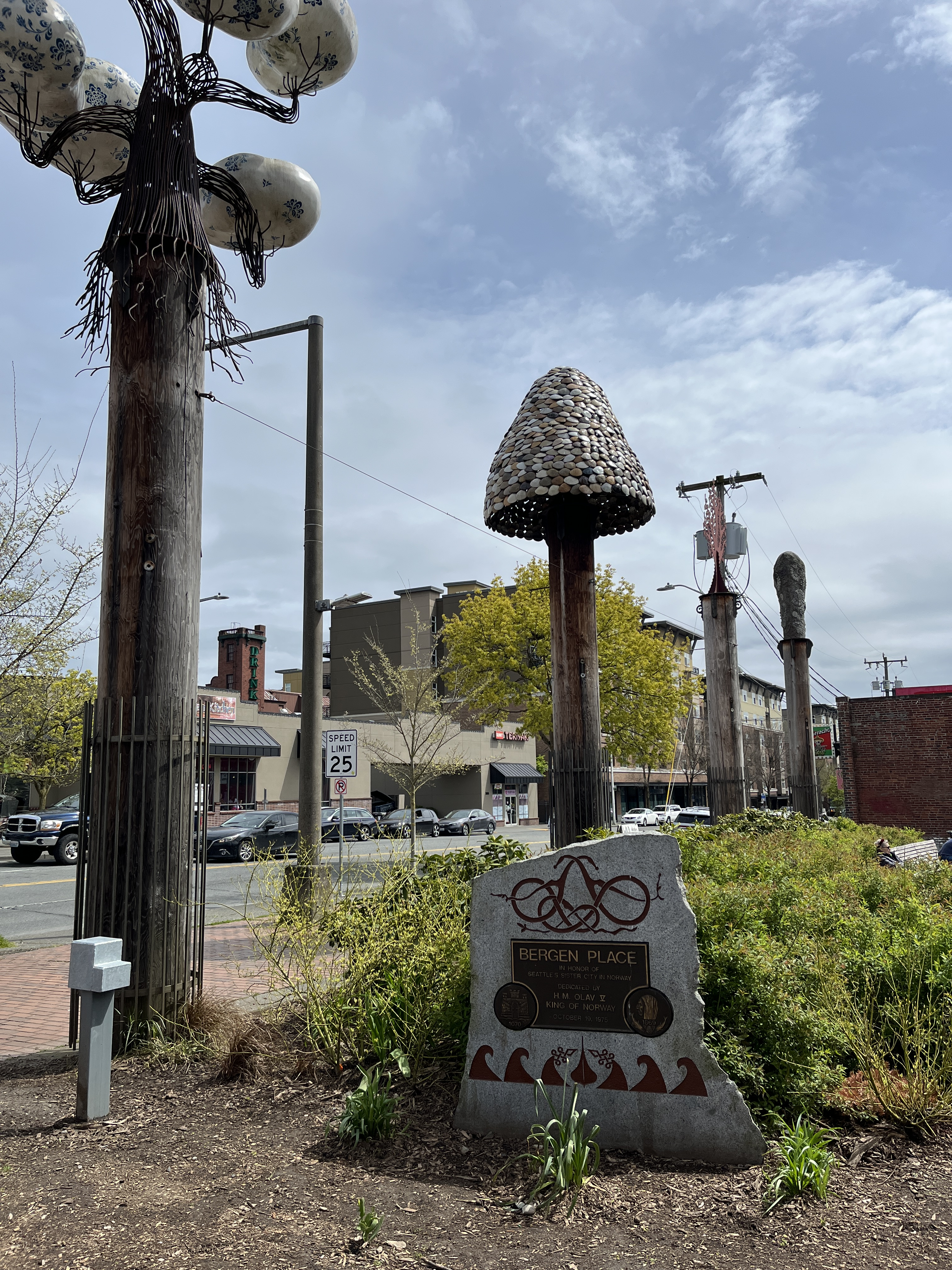
- The Hiram M. Chittenden Locks The Majestic Bay Theatre Bergen Place

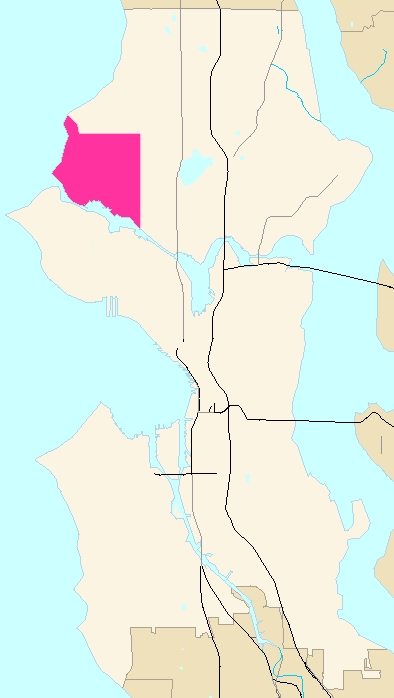
- Map of Ballard's location in Seattle
- Coordinates: 47.677°N 122.385°W
- Country: United States
- State: Washington
- City: Seattle
- Time zone: UTC-8 (Pacific Time)
  - Summer (DST): UTC-7 (Pacific Daylight Time)

Ballard is a neighborhood in northwestern Seattle, Washington, United States. Formerly an independent city, the City of Seattle's official boundaries define it as bounded to the north by Crown Hill (N.W. 85th Street), to the east by Greenwood, Phinney Ridge and Fremont (along 3rd Avenue N.W.), to the south by the Lake Washington Ship Canal, and to the west by Puget Sound's Shilshole Bay. Like many neighborhoods in Seattle, its boundaries are loosely defined; these are the ones recognized by the city's municipal departments.

Landmarks in Ballard include the Ballard (Hiram M. Chittenden) Locks, the National Nordic Museum, the Shilshole Bay Marina, and Golden Gardens Park.

The neighborhood is located entirely within Seattle City Council District 6, which also includes the neighborhoods of Green Lake, Phinney Ridge and Greenwood, along with parts of Magnolia, Fremont, Interbay, North Beach and Crown Hill. Ballard is part of the Seattle Public Schools and the Washington State Legislature's 36th legislative district. At the federal level, Ballard is part of the United States House of Representatives's 7th congressional district.

== History ==
=== Early settlement ===
As with all of Seattle, the area now called Ballard was settled by the ancestors of today's Coast Salish people at the end of the last glacial period, specifically the Duwamish (dxʷdəwʔabš) tribe. There were plentiful salmon and clams in the region. When settlers from the United States arrived, the area around Shilshole and Salmon Bays was home to a settlement (called šilšul) that has since been excavated; its artifacts are in the collection of the Burke Museum in the University District. According to oral traditions from before European contact, the group living around Shilshole may have been in decline due to a "great catastrophe". The decline of the Shilshole village was thought to have been due to raids from the slave-holding Haida people from the Queen Charlotte Islands (Now called Haida Gwaii) in British Columbia, and these raids also alarmed non-Indigenous settlers. The remaining dozen or fewer families were evicted by American settlers in the mid-19th century. The last member of the Shilshole village, named Hwelchteed but better known as "Salmon Bay Charlie", was evicted and forcibly removed in 1914 to make room for the construction of the Hiram Chittenden Locks.

The first White resident in the area, homesteader Ira Wilcox Utter, moved to his claim in 1853. Utter hoped to see a rapid expansion of population, but when this did not happen, he sold the land to Thomas Burke, a judge. Thirty-six years later, Judge Burke, together with John Leary and railroader Daniel H. Gilman, formed the West Coast Improvement Company to develop Burke's land holdings in the area. They anticipated the building of BNSF's Great Northern Railway along the Salmon Bay coastline on the way to Interbay and central Seattle. The partners also built a spur from Fremont's main line of the Seattle, Lake Shore and Eastern Railway. Today three miles (5 km) of this line, running along Salmon Bay from N.W. 40th Street to the BNSF Railway mainline at N.W. 67th, are operated as the Ballard Terminal Railroad.

During the late 19th century, Captain William Rankin Ballard, owner of land adjoining Judge Burke's holdings, joined the partnership with Burke, Leary, and Gilman. In 1887, the partnership was dissolved and the assets divided, but no one wanted the land in Salmon Bay so the partners flipped a coin. Capt. Ballard lost the coin-toss and ended up with the "undesirable" 160-acre (0.65 km^{2}) tract.

The railroad to Seattle stopped short at Salmon Bay because the railroad company was unwilling to build a trestle to cross the bay. From the stop at "Ballard Junction," (as the terminus was called) passengers could walk across the wagon bridge and continue the journey to Seattle. In addition to gaining notoriety as the end of the railway line, the fledgling town of Ballard benefited economically from the railway because it provided a way to import supplies and to export locally manufactured products. This trade connection spurred the growth of mills of many types. After the Great Seattle Fire in 1889 the mills provided opportunities for those who had lost jobs in the fire, which in turn spurred the growth of the settlement as families moved north to work in the mills. Ballard's first mill, built in 1888 by Mr. J Sinclair was a lumber mill; the second, finished the same year was a shingle mill. The local western red cedar's wood was extremely well-suited to the creation of shingles, and Ballard quickly became the center of shingle production in the region, earning the nicknames "Shingletown" and the "Shingle Capital of America." Ballard High School's mascot was the Shingle Weavers until the 1950s, when it switched to the Beavers, referencing the timber industry more generally. Ballard experienced an influx of Scandinavian immigrants during this period, and Scandinavian culture and traditions would be influential on Ballard as it developed.

=== City of Ballard ===
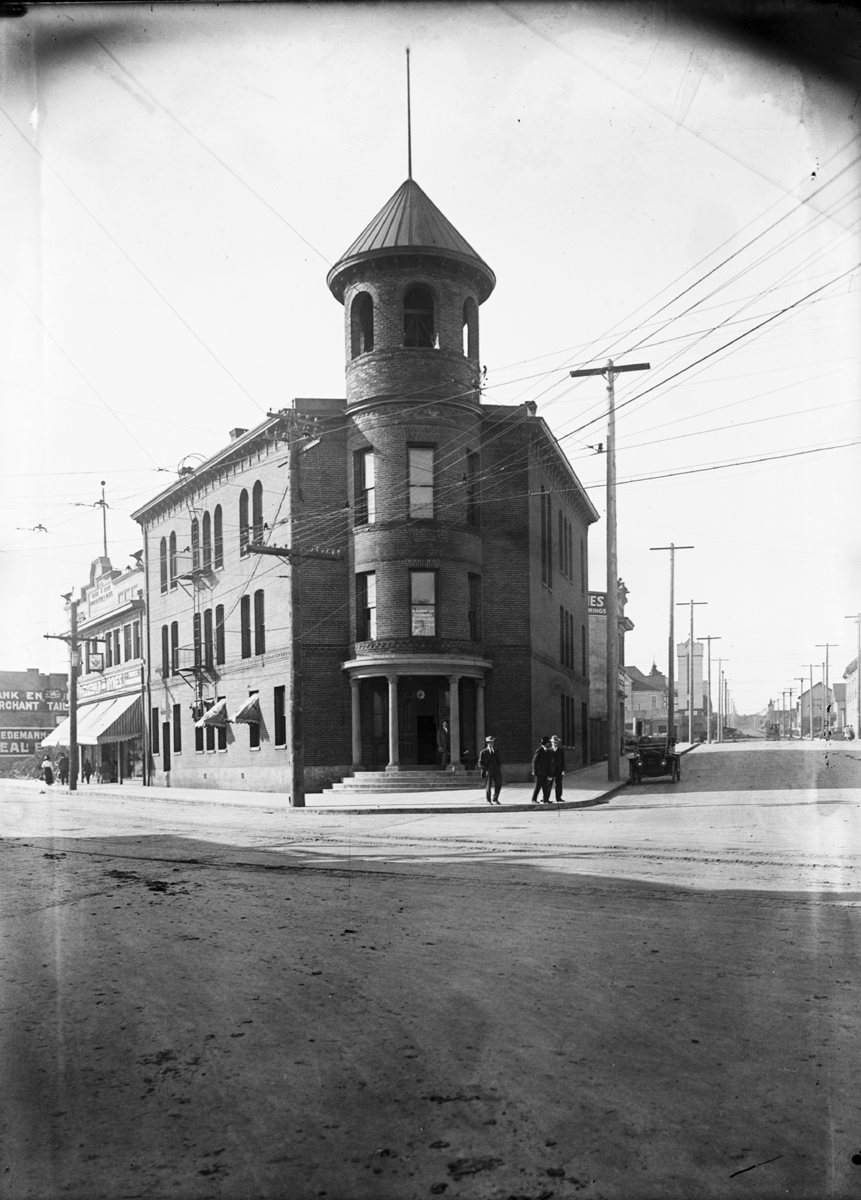
Ballard City Hall, photographed 1915.

With the rapid population growth, residents decided that laws were needed to keep order in the community, a process that would require a formal government. In the late summer of 1889, incorporation as a town was discussed but eventually rejected. However, several months later, on November 4, 1889, the residents again voted on the question and this time they voted to incorporate. The first mayor of Ballard was Charles F. Treat. A municipal census, conducted shortly after the passing vote showed that the new town of Ballard had more than 1500 residents, allowing it to be the first "third-class town" to be incorporated in the State of Washington, which had been admitted to the U.S. just a week after the vote.

By 1900, Ballard's population had grown to 4,568, making it the seventh-largest city in Washington, and was faced with many of the problems common to small towns. In 1904, the drinking and gambling had become so bad that the mayor ordered the City of Ballard officially closed for the day to prevent gambling. The city had troubles with loose livestock, and so the Cow Ordinance of 1903 made allowing cows to graze south of present-day 65th St. a punishable offense. Ballard also faced more serious problems: the lack of both a proper water supply and a sewer system. Due to its location on Salmon Bay, there was a lack of nearby freshwater springs, which meant that water came from groundwater wells. The absence of a proper sewage system contaminated the ground water, compounding the problem.

The town continued to grow and reached 17,000 residents by 1907 to become the second-largest city in King County. However, like many of the other small cities surrounding Seattle, it continued to be plagued by water problems. The growing population had overwhelmed the city's ability to provide services, particularly safe drinking water and sewers, and Ballard's city government had tried unsuccessfully to deal with the crises. That made the citizens begin to consider asking Seattle to annex the town. In 1905, the residents voted, deciding against annexation in hope of another solution, but the water issues remained. In July 1906, the Washington Supreme Court ruled that Seattle was not allowed to provide water service to surrounding communities. Ballard had been dependent on a water sharing agreement with Seattle, but the Supreme Court decision left it with inadequate water and forced a second vote on the annexation question. The inability of local resources to cope with the situation caused the majority of residents to vote in favor of annexation. On May 29, 1907 at 3:45 a.m, the City of Ballard officially became part of Seattle. On that day, Ballard citizens demonstrated mixed feelings about the handover by draping their city hall with black crepe and flying the flag at half-mast.

=== Modern history ===
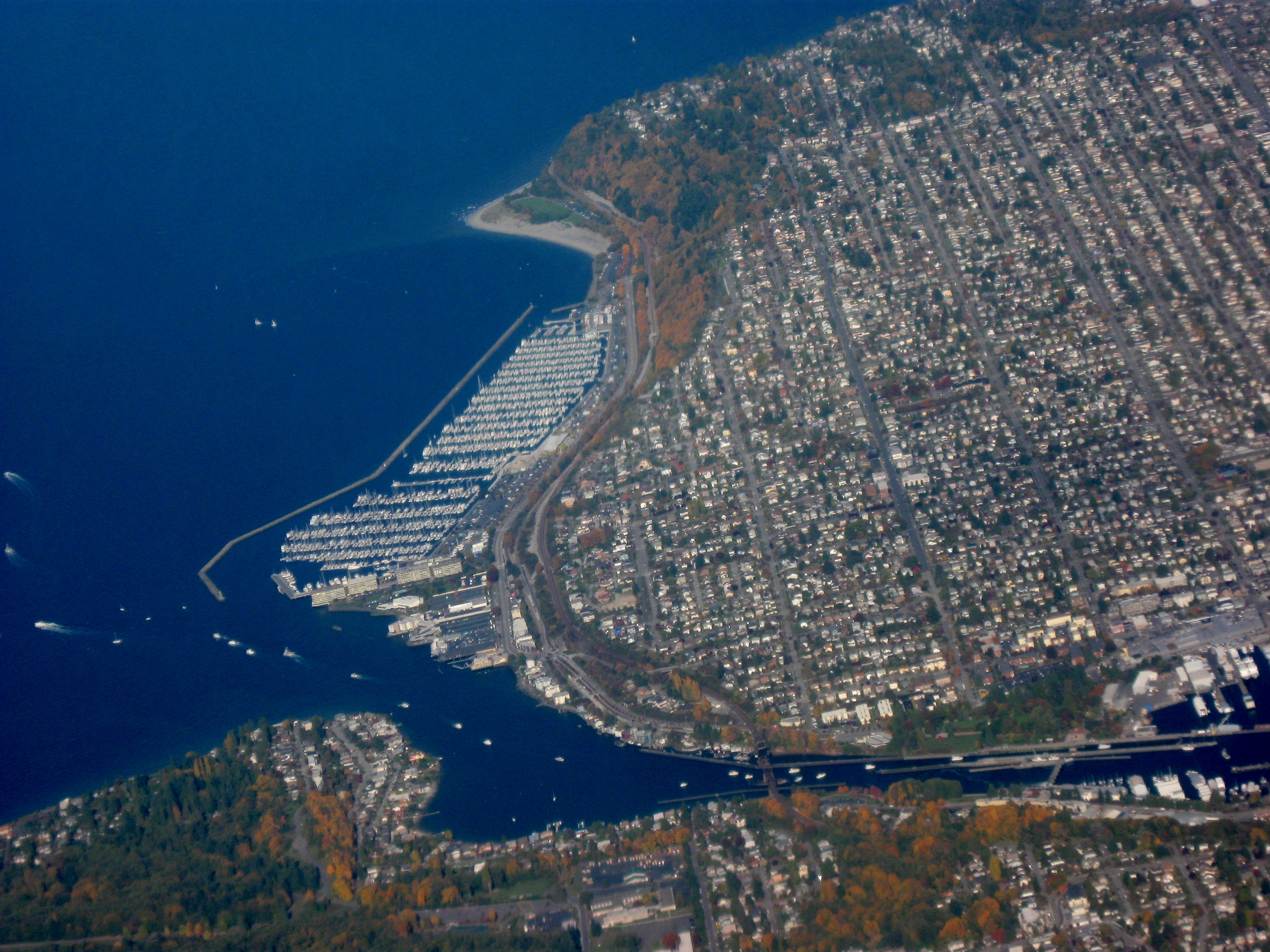
Aerial view of Shilshole Bay Marina and Lake Washington Ship Canal from the south

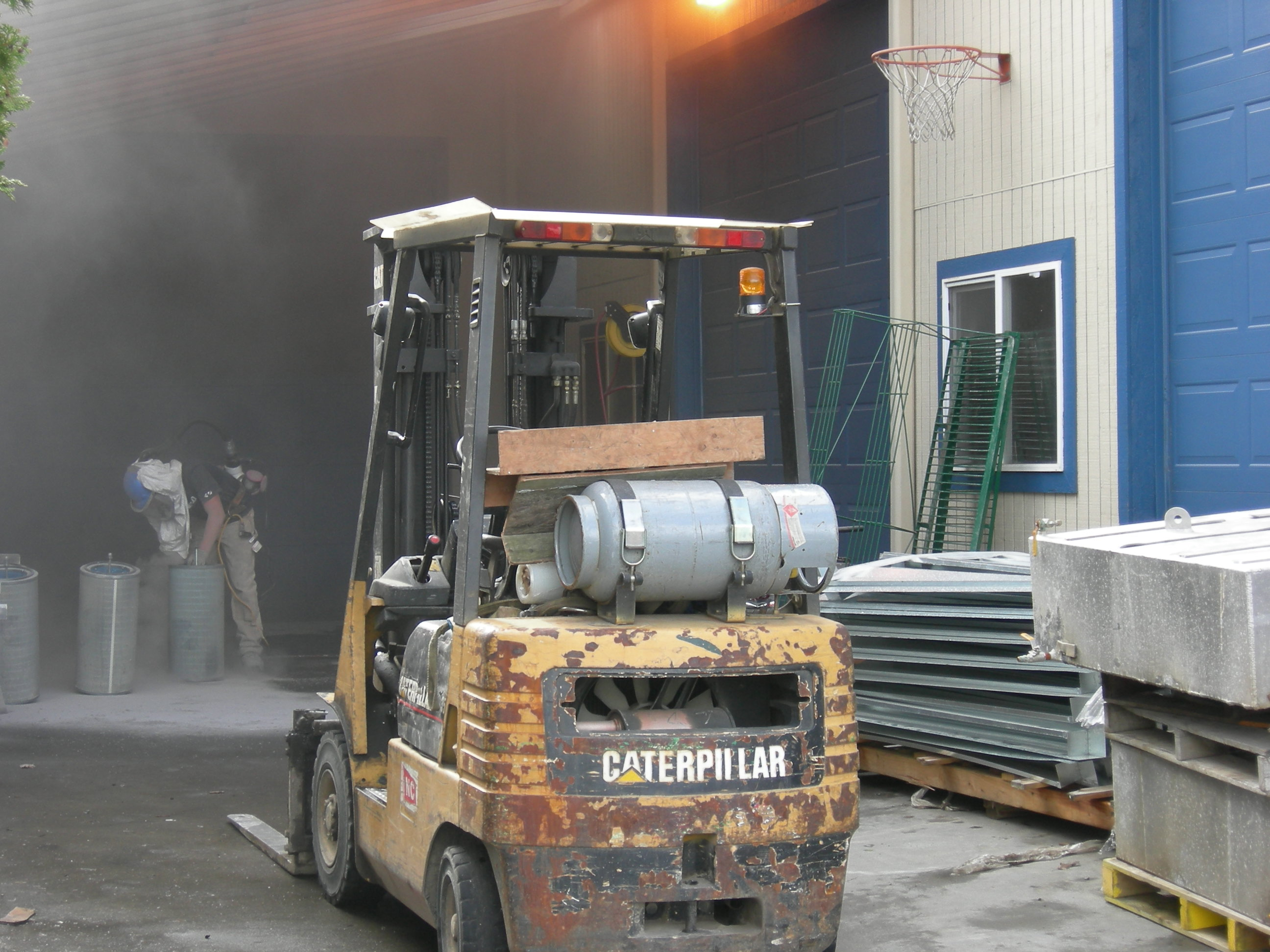
The lower part of Ballard Avenue still includes many light industrial businesses.

During the early 20th century, the Ballard area was home to the Ballard Shipbuilding Company, which produced ships for the US Navy during World War II as well as ships for civilian purposes. The area was also home to a significant number of fisheries and canneries. These marine industries formed the backbone of the Ballard economy for much of the 20th century.

At the end of the 20th century Ballard began to experience a real-estate boom. By early 2007, nearly 20 major apartment/retail projects were under construction or had just been completed within a five-block radius of downtown Ballard. This growth in urban density is the result of the neighborhood plan created by former Seattle Mayor Norm Rice. Mayor Rice's plan aimed to reduce suburban sprawl by targeting certain Seattle areas, including Ballard, for high-density development.

== Ballard Historical Society ==
The Ballard Historical Society is a volunteer-run non-profit historical society located in the Ballard neighborhood. The organization does not have any traditional exhibition space, but maintains a community presence through its self-guided historical tours, historical markers, lectures, community events, and collections. The Ballard Historical Society's collections include memorabilia, historical archives, photographs, and other objects relating to Ballard History. The society has made its photo archives available online. The organization has 501(c)(3) tax-exempt status.

Formed in 1988 with encouragement from the Ballard Centennial Committee in celebration of the Washington state centennial in 1989, the organization's establishment coincided with the publication of Passport to Ballard, a collection of essays on the neighborhood's history from pre-European settlement up through the 1980s. In April 2007, the Ballard Historical Society unveiled its Historic Markers, which can be seen on buildings in the Ballard Avenue Historic District.

The organization also co-produced, along with the Nordic Heritage Museum and Swedish-Finn Historical Society, Voices of Ballard: Immigrant Stories from the Vanishing Generation (2001), a book collecting oral histories from long-time Ballard residents who have made the neighborhood home since before the 1960s. The Ballard Walking Tour, a self-guided tour created by the organization, highlights 20 different historic sites on and around Ballard Avenue. The most recent illustrated Tour Brochure was released in February 2009.

Every three years the Ballard Historical Society organizes the Ballard Classic Homes Tour and features a different set of vintage homes in Ballard during each parade of houses.

== Culture ==
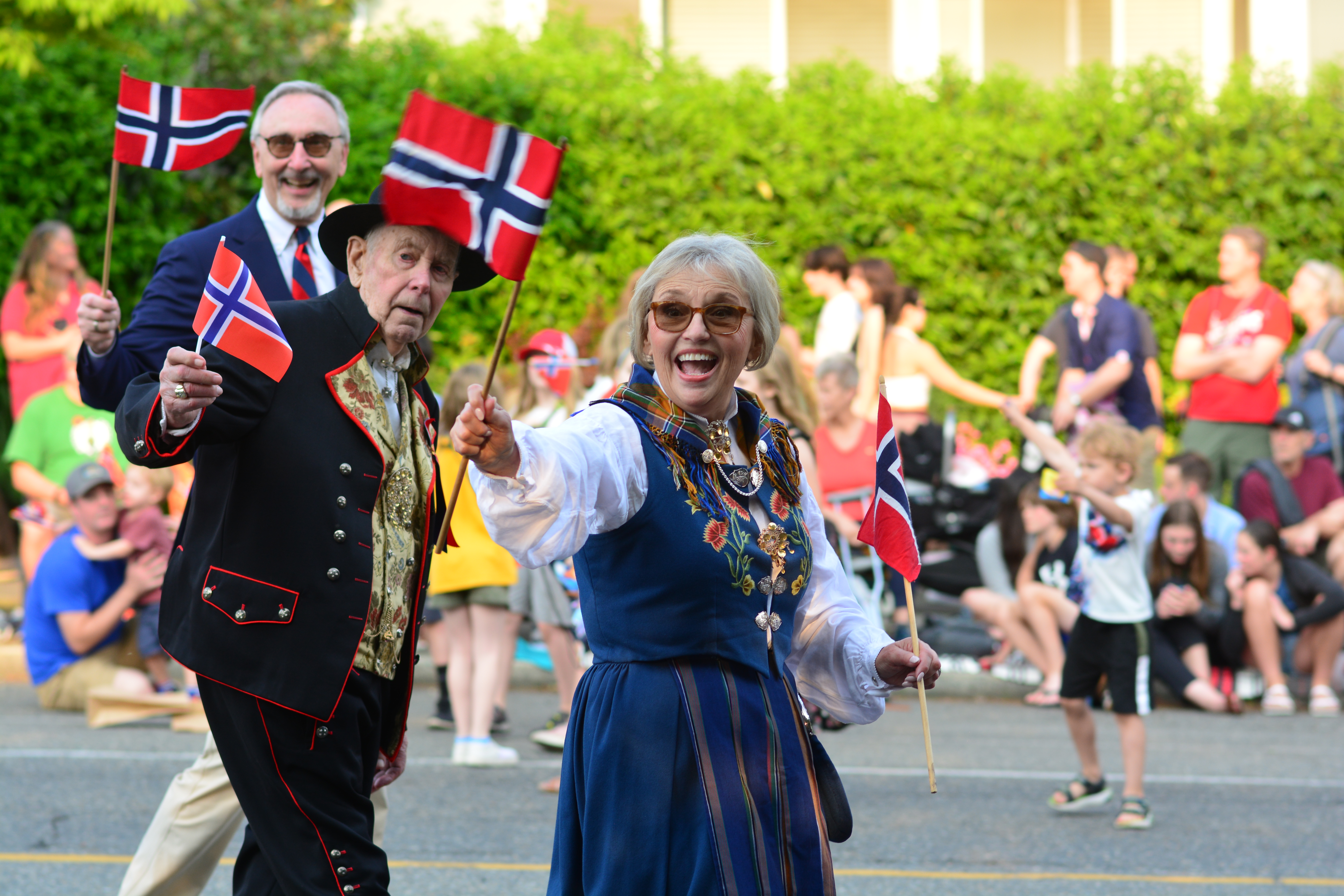
The Norwegian Commercial Club at Ballard's Syttende mai Parade

Ballard is the traditional center of Seattle's Scandinavian community, who were drawn to the area because of the salmon fishing opportunities.In recent years the proportion of Scandinavian residents has decreased, but the neighborhood still celebrates their part in its heritage. Ballard is home to the National Nordic Museum, with exhibits on both the community of Ballard and more general Scandinavian history. Scandinavians unite in organizations such as the Sons of Norway Leif Erikson Lodge and the Norwegian Ladies Chorus of Seattle. Each year the community celebrates Norwegian Constitution Day (also called Syttende mai) on May 17 to commemorate the signing of the Norwegian Constitution, with a parade that is one of the largest outside of Norway itself. Locals once nicknamed the neighborhood "Snoose Junction," a reference to the Scandinavian settlers' practice of using snus.

Over the years, Ballard has added venues for live music, including bars, restaurants and coffee shops. Each month, the Ballard Alliance (a chamber of commerce) sponsors the ArtWalk. Ballard's main commercial area (located along Market St. and the historic Ballard Ave.) also boasts a variety of restaurants and local shops. The Deep Sea Fishermen's Union, which represents commercial fishermen, is based in Ballard. The Ballard Brewery District features about a dozen breweries. The Majestic Bay Theatre on Market Street is on the same location as the former Bay and Majestic theaters. Before closing for the new construction the Bay Theatre was the longest continuously operating movie theatre on the West Coast after the closure of the Cameo in Los Angeles.

The neighborhood is home to two soccer teams, Ballard FC (men's) and Salmon Bay FC (women's), which were founded in 2022 and 2024 and play in USL League 2 and USL W League. The semi-professional teams are owned by two groups led respectively by former Seattle Sounders FC player Lamar Neagle and Lauren Barnes, a former player on Seattle Reign FC. Both teams play in Interbay, across Salmon Bay from Ballard, at the 900-seat Interbay Stadium.

== Education ==
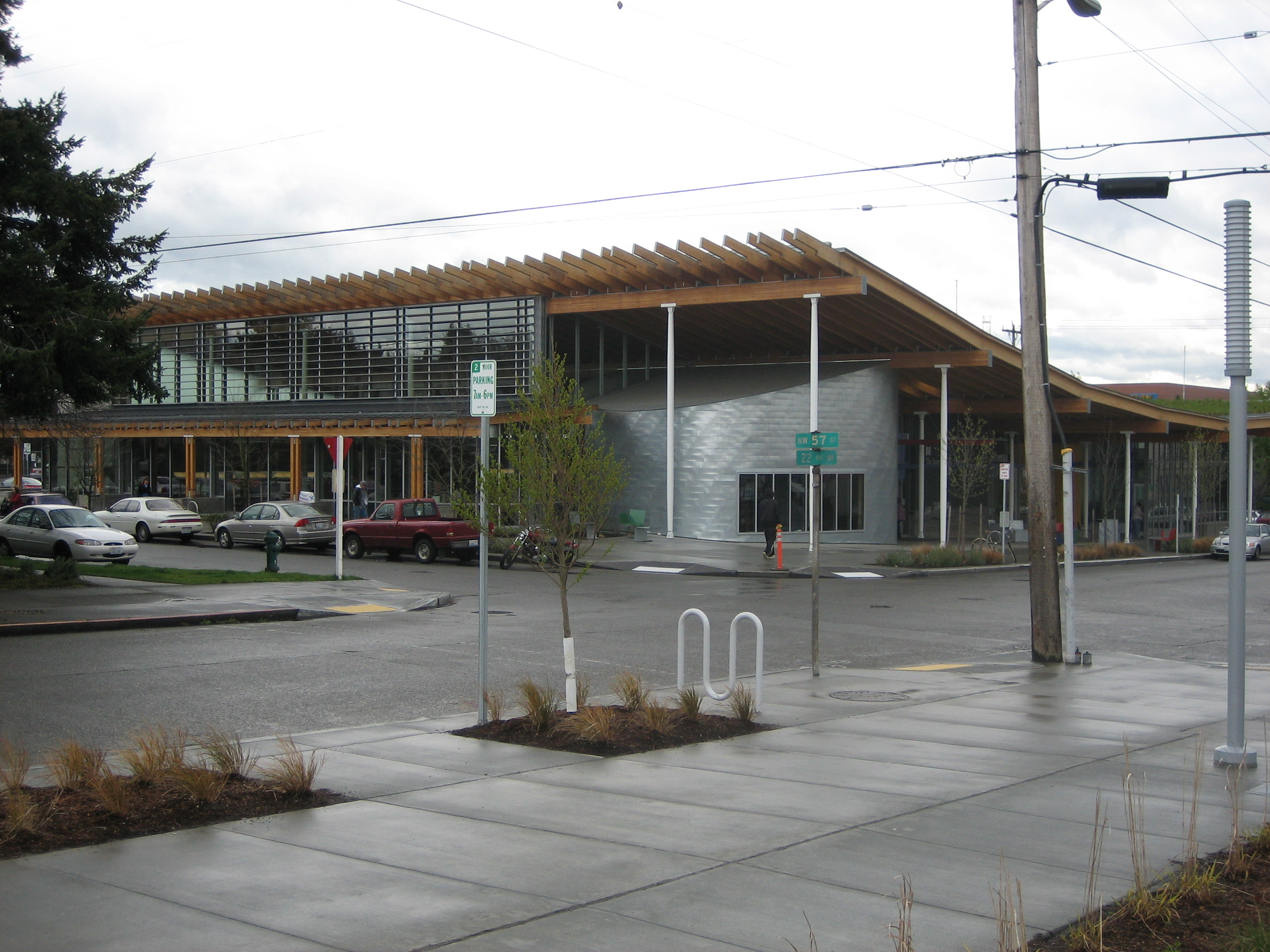
Ballard Library, a block north of Market Street

The public schools in the neighborhood are part of the citywide Seattle Public Schools district. Ballard High School, located in the neighborhood, is the oldest continuously-operating high school in the city. The original building was demolished in the late 1990s. The new school building is now one of the largest in the district and formerly housed a biotechnology magnet program that attracted students from all over Seattle. The high school has been supported by Amgen, ZymoGenetics, G. M. Nameplate, the Youth Maritime Training Association, North Seattle Community College, Seattle City Light, and Swedish Hospital.

There are several elementary schools and one alternative school located in the neighborhood. The closest middle school is Whitman Middle School, which is located north of Ballard in the Crown Hill neighborhood.

- Adams Elementary School (K-5)
- Loyal Heights Elementary School (K-5)
- Matheia School (K-5, private independent)
- North Beach Elementary School (K-5)
- Salmon Bay School (K-8)
- St. Alphonsus School (K-8, Catholic)
- West Woodland Elementary School (K-5)
- Whittier Elementary School (K-5)

=== Libraries ===
The Ballard Public Library was first created as the Carnegie Free Public Library in 1904. In 1907, after annexation, the library became part of the Seattle Public Library system. The original Carnegie building on Market Street was replaced with new construction on 24th Avenue NW in 1963. 42 years later, in 2005, a new library building on 22nd Avenue NW designed by architectural firm Bohlin Cywinski Jackson, was opened as part of the Seattle Public Library's "Libraries for All" initiative. The original Carnegie building on Market Street is a restaurant.

== Infrastructure ==
=== Transportation ===
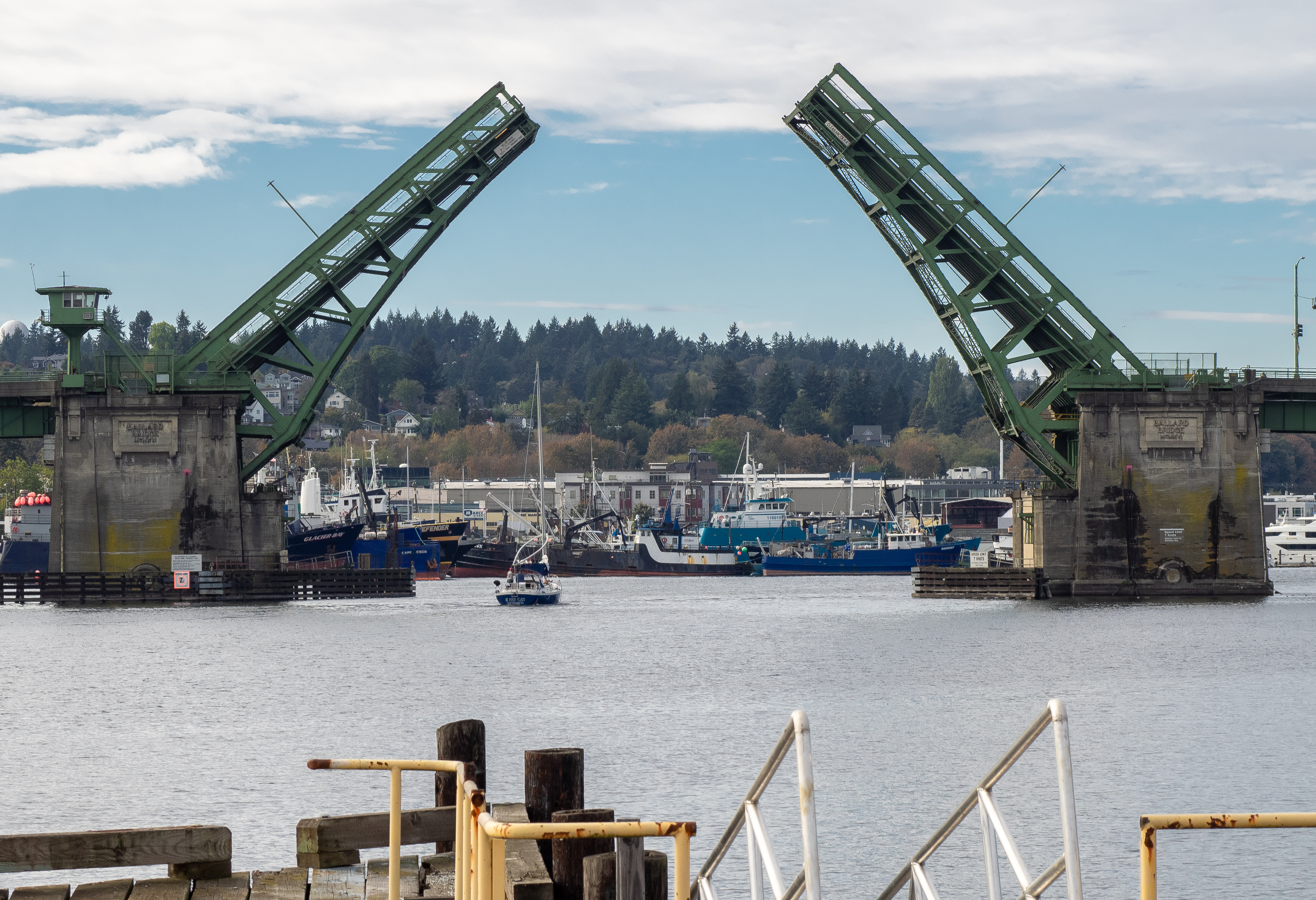
The Ballard Bridge

Ballard has several major streets that connect the neighborhood to other parts of Seattle as well as regional highways and freeways, such as Interstate 5. Northwest Market Street runs west from Ballard to State Route 99 (Aurora Avenue), becomes North 45th Street, and continues to an interchange with Interstate 5 and into the University District. Northwest Leary Way connects to Fremont and the Fremont Bridge over the Lake Washington Ship Canal. The neighborhood's busiest road is 15th Avenue Northwest, which carries a daily average of 35,000 vehicles north of Market Street and continues towards Crown Hill. It crosses the Ship Canal on the Ballard Bridge, a drawbridge that carried 45,000 daily vehicles in 2023, on its route through Interbay towards Downtown Seattle.

King County Metro provides local and express bus service on several routes within Ballard and to surrounding areas. The RapidRide D Line, a bus route with some bus rapid transit features, began service in September 2012 and runs on 15th Avenue Northwest. It replaced an earlier local bus route that had been a trolleybus route operated by the Seattle Transit System until 1963. Metro has two other routes with frequent service that serve Ballard: route 40, which runs on Northwest Leary Way to Fremont and continues to Downtown Seattle; and route 44, a trolleybus route that runs on Northwest Market Street and North 45th Street towards the University District and University of Washington station. Both routes were listed as future RapidRide corridors to be funded by the 2017 Move Seattle levy.

Proposals to build rapid transit between Ballard and Downtown Seattle date back to 1911, when civic planner Virgil Bogue proposed a citywide subway system. The Forward Thrust program proposed two ballot measures in 1968 and 1970 to fund a modern subway system that would have several stations in Ballard on a line towards Downtown Seattle. They both failed to reach the required 60 percent threshold to pass. The Seattle Monorail Project, which began with a voter-approved ballot measure in 1997, proposed a 14-mile (23 km) monorail line between Ballard and West Seattle that would be completed by 2009. After several subsequent ballot measures and changes to the design and financial projections, the project was shelved in 2005.

In 2016, voters approved a funding package for Sound Transit that included the Ballard Link Extension, a project to extend the regional Link light rail system to Ballard. The neighborhood's station was planned to be built near the intersection of 15th Avenue Northwest and Northwest Market Street, and the construction of the project included a possible second tunnel being constructed in Downtown Seattle. In June 2026, the Sound Transit Board voted to defer the portion of this extension from Seattle Center to Ballard in response to funding shortages.

== Registered historic places ==
The following Ballard buildings, areas and landmarks are listed on the National Register of Historic Places:

Ballard Avenue Historic District	Along Ballard Avenue N.W. between N.W. Market Street and N.W. Dock Place (added in 1976, ID #76001885).
Ballard Carnegie Library	On N.W. Market Street (added 1979, ID #79002535).
Fire Station No. 18	At the corner of Russell Avenue N.W. and N.W. Market (added 1973, ID #73001876).
Ballard Bridge	(added 1982, ID #82004231),
Hiram M. Chittenden Locks and the Lake Washington Ship Canal	(added 1978, ID #78002751).

== Notable residents ==
- James Acord – sculpture artist
- Josh Barnett – UFC fighter
- Carl Deuker – young adult sports author
- Tom Douglas – restauranteur
- Jimothy – raccoon (local "cryptid")
- Jerry Holkins - writer
- Edith Macefield – real estate hold out
- Dori Monson – radio personality
- Zoa Sherburne – author
- Karsten Solheim (1911–2000) – founder of PING golf clubs
