= Swedish Finn Historical Society =

Genealogical society in Washington, US

The Swedish Finn Historical Society is a nonprofit, genealogical association in Seattle, Washington, US.

Persons sharing an interest in Finland Swedish culture, tradition, and history founded the Swedish-Finn Historical Society in 1991.

Their mission statement: "To gather and preserve the emigration history of Finland Swedes across the world; connect Finland Swedes to their roots in Finland; and celebrate our cultural heritage."

The society maintains an archive and a library containing material pertaining to Finland Swedish culture, history, and tradition and makes this material available for interpretive, educational and research purposes. The society publishes a periodical, the Quarterly, and maintains a website. The Society provides genealogical information to members. The society arranges and participates in cultural events. The society invites people interested in the Finland Swedish culture and tradition worldwide to become members.
