= U District station =

Light rail station in Seattle, Washington

47 U District
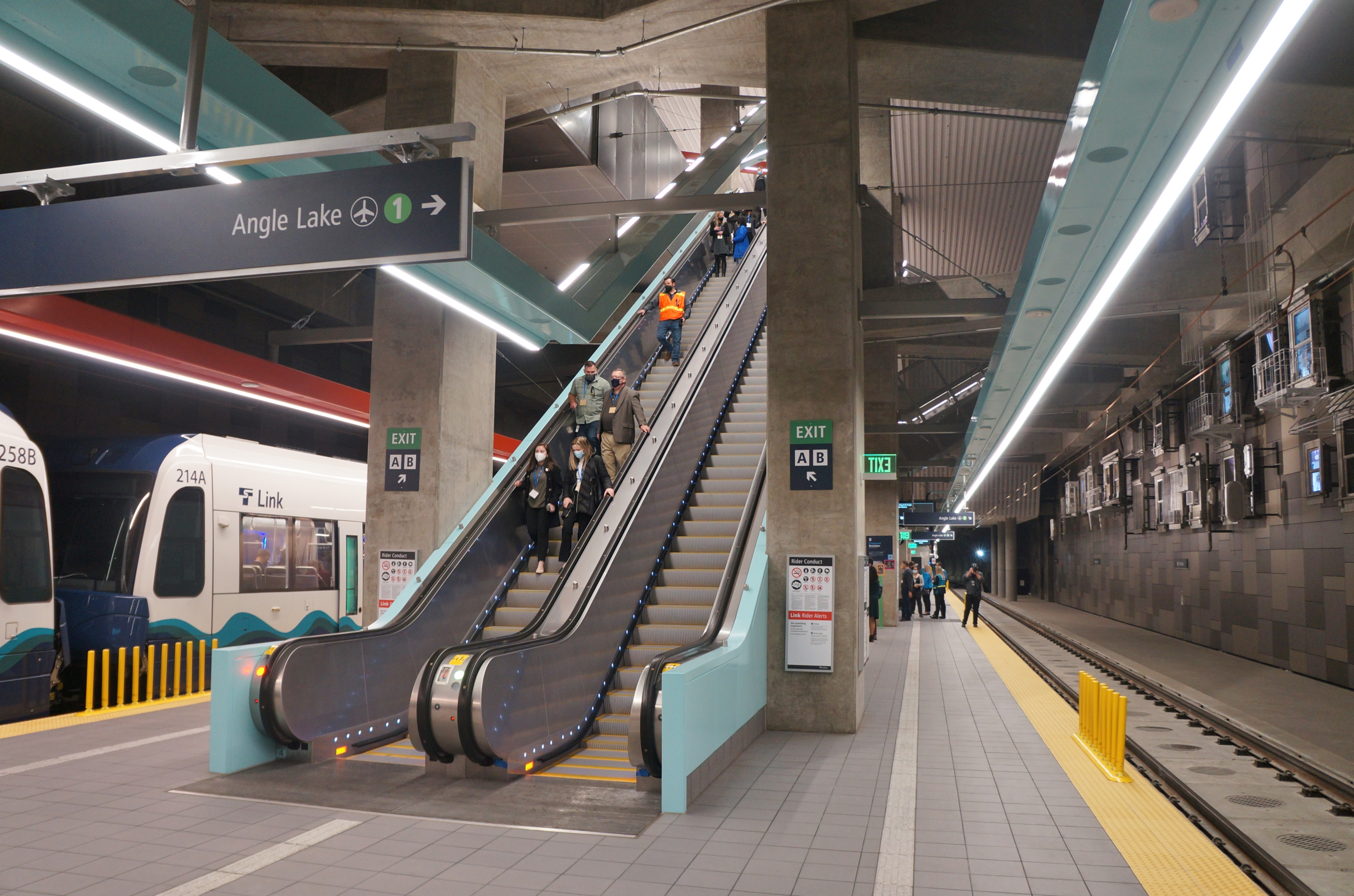
- Platform level prior to opening day

General information
- Location: 4300 Brooklyn Avenue Northeast; Seattle, Washington; United States
- Coordinates: 47°39′38″N 122°18′51″W
- System: Link light rail
- Owner: Sound Transit
- Platforms: 1 island platform
- Tracks: 2
- Connections: King County Metro, Sound Transit Express

Construction
- Structure type: Underground
- Cycle facilities: Lockers and racks
- Accessible: Yes

History
- Opened: October 2, 2021

Passengers
- 7,526 daily weekday boardings (2025); 2,523,551 total boardings (2025)

Services
Preceding station	Sound Transit	Following station
Link
Roosevelt toward Lynnwood City Center	1 Line	University of Washington toward Federal Way Downtown
Roosevelt toward Lynnwood City Center	2 Line	University of Washington toward Downtown Redmond
Location

U District station is a light rail station in the University District neighborhood of Seattle, Washington, United States. It is served by the 1 Line and 2 Line, both part of Sound Transit's Link light rail system. The underground station has two entrances along Brooklyn Avenue Northeast at 43rd and 45th streets near the University of Washington campus.

Construction of the station began in 2012 as part of the Northgate Link extension, which was approved by voters in a 2008 ballot measure. It opened on October 2, 2021, along with the rest of the extension. Light rail trains arrive at the station at frequencies of up to eight minutes during peak periods and 10–15 minutes at other times. U District station also includes five bus bays served by several King County Metro and Sound Transit Express routes that connect to nearby areas.

== Location ==
U District station is located under the east side of Brooklyn Avenue Northeast between Northeast 43rd and 45th streets, at the heart of the University District urban village in northern Seattle. It is near the area's main commercial corridor, The Ave, which runs a block east on University Way Northeast. To the west of the station is UW Tower, a high-rise office building used by the University of Washington (UW); adjacent to the station's north entrance is the historic Neptune Theatre. To the east is the university campus as well as the Burke Museum of Natural History and Culture on 15th Avenue Northeast.

=== Transit-oriented development ===
The area surrounding U District station is a walkable neighborhood primarily consisting of commercial space and multi-family residential housing. Within a 1/2 mile (0.80 km) of the station is one of the densest concentrations of housing and jobs in the region, with nearly 15,000 jobs and over 21,000 residents counted in 2013.

The station is designed to support up to 240 feet (73 m) of transit-oriented development on top of the entrances and station box. The city of Seattle began developing a comprehensive rezoning of the neighborhood to allow for taller buildings in 2013, proposing a maximum height limit of 340 feet (100 m) along NE 45th Street and 85 feet (26 m) in other parts of the neighborhood. The rezoning proposal ran into opposition from locals who filed an appeal to halt planning, citing a need for affordable housing and open space. A revised plan unveiled in September 2016 by Mayor Ed Murray requires new developments in the neighborhood to include rent-restricted affordable housing or pay a fine. The rezone was approved in March 2017, taking effect shortly thereafter, allowing a maximum height of 320 feet (98 m) for residential use and 160 feet (49 m) for offices. As of 2021, there are 20 high-rise buildings under development in the University District, including several above 20 stories in height.

The University of Washington showed interest in developing an office tower over the station box, whose development rights were acquired by the university in 2013. Neighborhood residents and activists, including former UW professor Phil Thiel, instead proposed a public plaza on top of the station, citing the dimensions being similar to those of central squares in European cities. The university approved a 50-year lease with the Lincoln Property Company in 2020 to develop a 12-story office tower above the station site. The Gateway Building, designed by Perkins&Will, began construction in 2023 and was completed in late 2024. The university pre-leased five floors through an air rights agreement and moved staff into the building in March 2025.

== History ==
=== Early proposals ===
Proposals for rapid transit service to the University District date back to the early 20th century. In 1911, Virgil Bogue proposed an extensive rapid transit system, including an underground subway from Downtown Seattle and Eastlake to Latona (the present-day University District), following 10th Avenue Northeast and intersecting an east–west line on Northeast 45th Street. The proposal was rejected by voters the following year. Another proposal in 1920 included a "rapid transit on surface" for Eastlake Avenue, terminating at 14th Avenue NE in the University District; the proposal's recommendation of a subway system was not acted upon by city leaders at the time.

The Forward Thrust plan of the late 1960s proposed building a four-line rapid transit network using $385 million in local funding to augment a larger federal contribution. One of the proposed lines, traveling between Downtown Seattle and Lake City, included a station at 15th Avenue Northeast and Northeast 45th Street adjacent to the Burke Museum. The plan was put before voters on two occasions, in February 1968 and May 1970, and failed to gain the needed supermajority to pass.

In the 1990s, the formation of a regional transit authority (RTA) spurred the planning of a modern light rail system for Seattle. In 1995, the transit authority proposed a regional light rail system to be built by 2010, including an at-grade or underground light rail line through the University District with a station near The Ave. The RTA proposal was rejected by voters in March 1995, citing its $6.7 billion price. A smaller, $3.9 billion plan was approved in November 1996, with the University District as its northern terminus; an extension north to Northgate via Roosevelt was deferred until additional funding could be secured.

=== Planning ===
The RTA, re-branded as Sound Transit, selected a preferred route for the light rail line in 1999. The northern terminus was to be an underground station on the east side of 15th Avenue Northeast and Northeast 45th Street with entrances in the Burke Museum parking lot and an adjacent university property; the next station would be at Northeast Pacific Street. The line would travel south via a tunnel under Portage Bay towards Downtown Seattle and Rainier Valley, ending at the Seattle–Tacoma International Airport. Cost over-runs and withheld funding from the federal government led Sound Transit to truncate its initial light rail line to Downtown in 2001, with the segment north to the University District to be built at a later date. In 2004, Sound Transit selected a route for tunneled light rail extensions through Capitol Hill and the University District and towards Northgate, using the Montlake Cut and including a station in the vicinity of Brooklyn Avenue NE and NE 45th Street.

Only the southernmost segment of the revised route, from Downtown to Husky Stadium on the south side of the university campus, was funded initially as the "University Link Extension". The northern segment to Northgate was split into a separate project, "North Link", and was included on the 2007 Roads and Transit ballot measure, which was put before voters in November 2007. The combined $18 billion proposal was rejected, with environmentalist groups disavowing it over the roadworks portion that sought to expand regional freeways. A second, transit-only measure known as "Sound Transit 2" was approved by voters in November 2008, securing funding for a light rail extension to Northgate. The North Link project was approved by the Sound Transit Board in June 2012, setting a $2.1 billion budget and expected completion date of 2021.

The 15th Avenue Northeast site for the University District's station was rejected in favor of an option on Brooklyn Avenue. The placement of the Brooklyn station, either on the north or south side of NE 45th Street, was debated by the Sound Transit Board in 2004. Seattle mayor Greg Nickels favored a station on the north side, but other boardmembers sided with community and business groups who wanted a site on the south side. The station site was further complicated the following year by Safeco's decision to expand its headquarters building on the west side of Brooklyn Avenue NE, impacting staging areas that were selected by Sound Transit. Ultimately, Safeco moved its headquarters to a downtown building in 2006, and sold the Brooklyn building to the University of Washington, and the staging areas remained available.

During the planning process, the station was referred to as "Brooklyn", after the street and historic name of the neighborhood. Sound Transit adopted the name "U District" in 2012, after input from public surveys; the abbreviation of "University" was done to avoid re-using the name alongside the University of Washington station at Husky Stadium. The agency also received public comments recommending renaming of the University Street station in Downtown Seattle, to avoid confusion with the stations at U District and University of Washington. University Street station is planned to be renamed to Union Street/Symphony station in 2024 as part of preparations for the opening of the 2 Line.

=== Construction and opening ===
External videos
- Simulation of construction stages (Sound Transit)

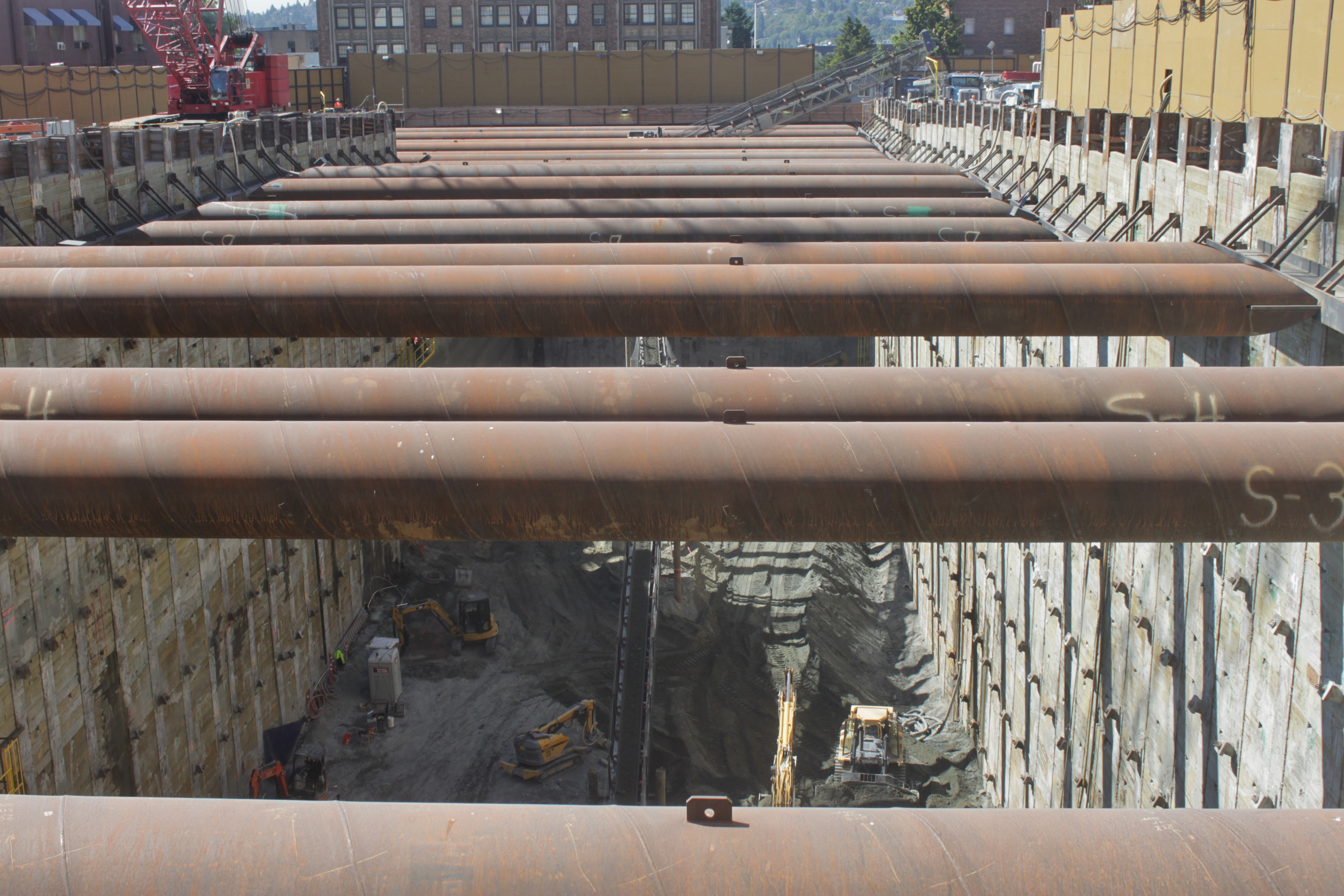
Excavation in June 2015

The contract for tunneling and station construction on the project, since renamed the "Northgate Link extension", was awarded by Sound Transit to JCM Northlink LLC (a joint venture of Jay Dee, Coluccio, and Michels) for $462 million in 2013. In May 2013, demolition of an existing Chase Bank branch and a university-owned property began at the future site of the station. In December, a segment of Brooklyn Avenue NE was closed through the work zone as part of final preparations for the station site. Construction of shoring walls and drilling of pilings in the station box was completed from April to August 2014, leading to the start of excavation the following month. By the completion of excavation the following summer, over 135,000 cubic yards (103,000 m^{3}) of dirt was removed from the site to reach a depth of 95 feet (29 m). Concrete pouring of the station box began in July 2015, to prepare for the arrival of two tunnel boring machines (TBMs).

The first of the two TBMs to arrive at U District station was "Brenda" on November 6, 2015, completing the northbound tunnel from Northgate via Roosevelt station. The second TBM, "Pamela", arrived later than expected on March 25, 2016, after stopping 650 feet (200 m) north of the station because of damage to the cutterhead and other parts that forced reduced speed to complete the southbound tunnel. "Brenda", since renamed "TBM #1", finished both of the remaining tunnels to University of Washington station in March 2016 and September 2016.

In March 2017, the Sound Transit Board awarded a $159.8 million contract to Hoffman Construction to build U District station, including structural and architectural finishes. Station construction began in August 2017 and was scheduled to last until 2020. A design change approved in October 2018 added a set of stairs between the mezzanine and platform due to escalator issues at other stations. Construction of the station was declared substantially complete in February 2021 and street access on Brooklyn Avenue was restored two months later. Light rail service at the station began on October 2, 2021, and was celebrated with a street fair on Brooklyn Avenue along with live performances and food walk on University Way. The opening of a bus-only lane on Northeast 43rd Street, serving a bus bay at the station's south entrance, was delayed to June 2022 due to the discovery of underground utilities during construction and supply chain issues. The 2 Line entered simulated service on February 14, 2026, with passengers able to board trains from Lynnwood to International District/Chinatown station. Sound Transit estimates that there will be 12,000 daily boardings at the station in 2030.

== Station layout ==
U District station is located on the east side of Brooklyn Avenue Northeast between Northeast 43rd and 45th streets. The underground station has two entrances: the north entrance (Exit A) near 45th and adjacent to the Neptune Theatre; and the south entrance (Exit B) at the intersection of Brooklyn and 43rd. The entrances are identified from street level by two accent colors (orange for the north, teal for the south) and large graphics with the station name. Both entrances have ticket vending machines, elevators to the platforms, and both stairs and escalators leading to the mezzanine level. The south entrance also has 52 bicycle storage spaces in a covered cage with a bicycle pump, while the north entrance has bicycle racks and lockers. The mezzanine leads to two sets of escalators and stairs that travel down to the lone island platform, located 85 feet (26 m) below the surface.

=== Design and art ===
The station was designed by LMN Architects, a Seattle-based firm that also designed the University of Washington station. It occupies 105,000 square feet (9,800 m^{2}) and spans five floors, of which four are underground.

Public art is integrated into the station's design as part of the "STart" program, which allocates a percentage of project construction funds to art projects to be used in stations. Lead Pencil Studio was commissioned to create Fragment Brooklyn, a platform-level installation at the station that covers the west wall with depictions of architectural features. The piece primarily uses hammered aluminum for the fixtures, which includes windows with screens that display videos, fire escapes, and rooflines. The fixtures drew inspiration from buildings in the University District and Brooklyn, New York, as well as the phenomenon of "parasitic architecture" that Lead Pencil Studio researched using LiDAR scans of cities. The 20 windows display 100 total hours of looping videos that include inanimate objects as well as people engaging in daily activities.

U District station was represented in maps and signage by a pictogram that depicted a pile of three books. The pictogram series was retired in 2024 and replaced by station numbers.

== Services ==
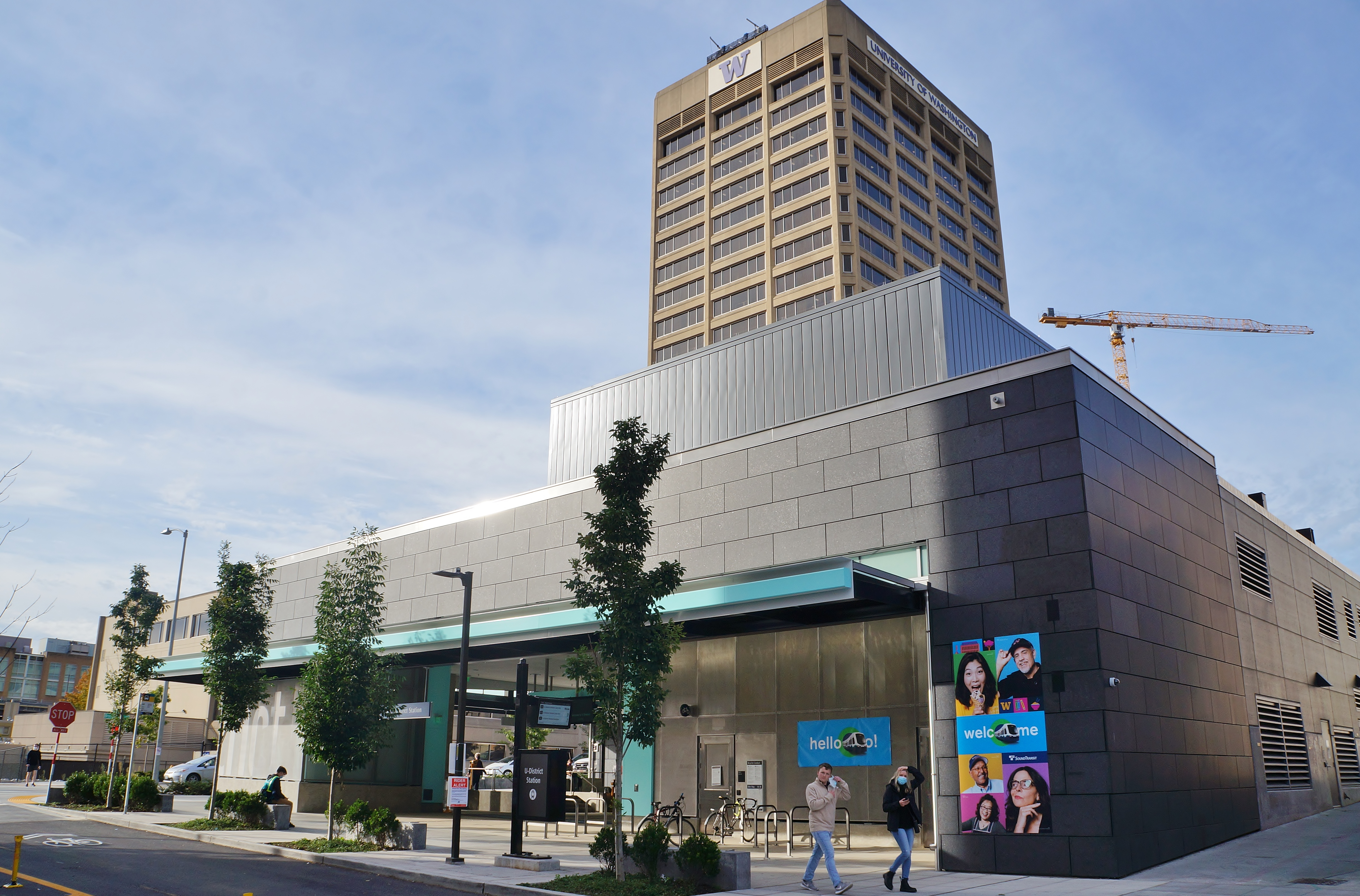
The south entrance of U District station and its adjacent bus bay

The station is served by the 1 Line and 2 Line, both part of the Link light rail system. U District is situated between Roosevelt and University of Washington stations; it is the sixth southbound station from Lynnwood City Center, the northern terminus of both lines. Link light rail trains serve U District station 20 hours a day on weekdays and Saturdays, from 5:00 a.m. to 12:00 a.m.; and 18 hours on Sundays, from 6:00 a.m. to 12:00 a.m. During regular weekday service, trains on each line operate roughly every eight minutes during rush hour, ten minutes during midday operation, and twelve to fifteen minutes in the early morning and at night. On weekends, trains on each line arrive at U District station every ten minutes during midday hours and every twelve to fifteen minutes during mornings and evenings. The two lines combine for frequencies of four minutes during rush hour and five minutes during midday and weekend service. The station is approximately 12 minutes from Westlake station in Downtown Seattle, 39 minutes from Bellevue Downtown station, and 50 minutes from SeaTac/Airport station. In 2025, an average of 7,526 passengers boarded Link trains at U District station on weekdays.

U District station is also served by several King County Metro and Sound Transit Express buses that provide onward connections to surrounding neighborhoods and regional destinations. The station has five bus bays, primarily on Northeast 45th Street and University Way, and an additional stop on 15th Avenue Northeast for regional routes. King County Metro operates routes from U District station with connections to most of North Seattle, as well as Downtown Seattle, Capitol Hill, and the Central District. Sound Transit Express route 542 connects the station to Redmond via State Route 520. Metro's RapidRide J Line, planned to open in 2027, will begin at the station and connect to Eastlake and South Lake Union.
