= Donut Factory =

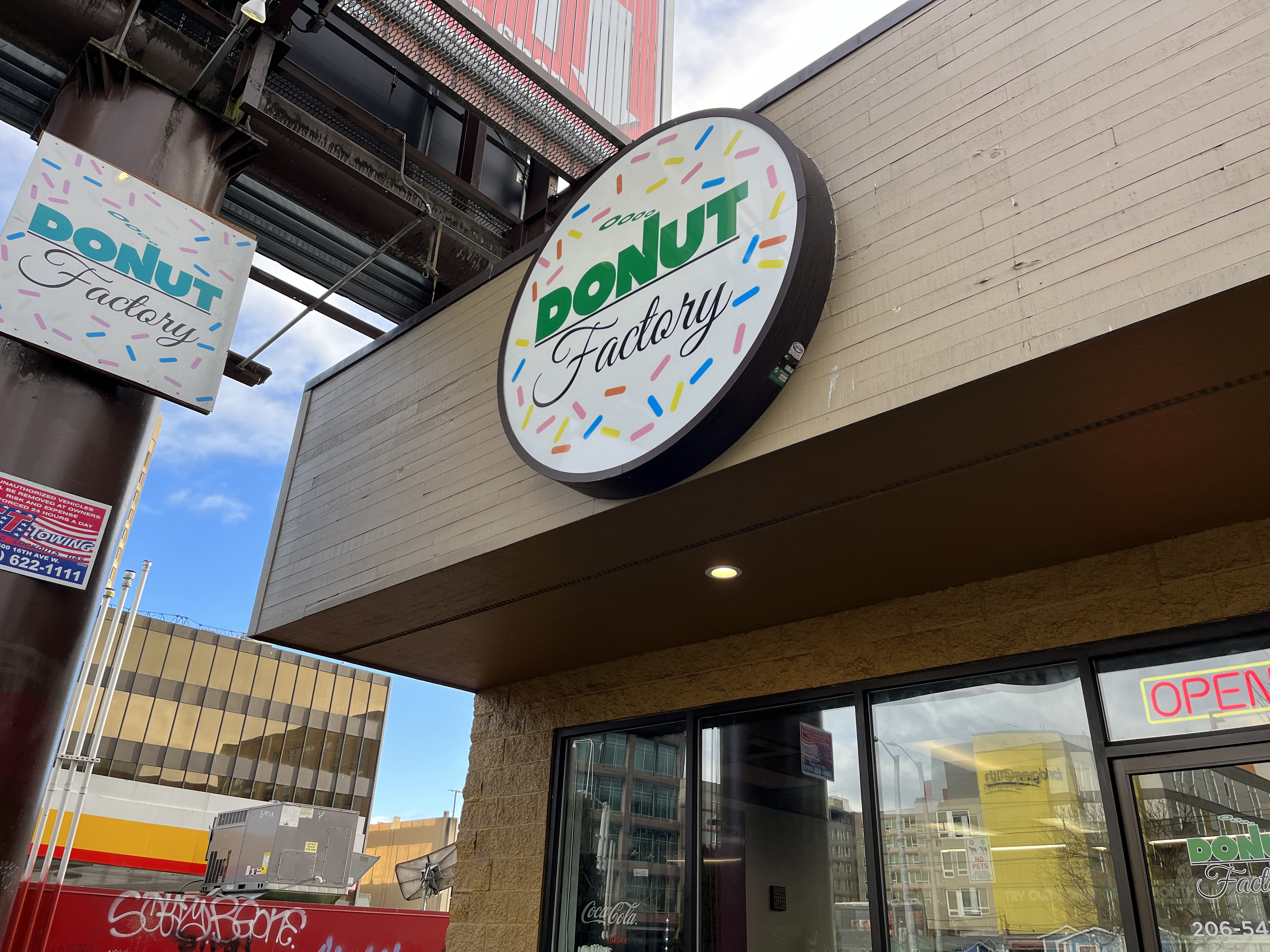
- Exterior of the shop in Seattle's University District, 2024
- Interactive map of Donut Factory

Restaurant information
- Owners: Marvin Crespo; Bryan Phaysith; Marc Sapatin
- Location: 20815 67th Ave W, Lynnwood, Washington, 98036, United States
- Coordinates: 47.81001°N 122.3230°W
- Website: donutfactoryinc.com

Donut Factory is a small chain of doughnut shops in the Seattle metropolitan area, in the U.S. state of Washington. The original shop operates in Lynnwood, and an outpost opened in Seattle's University District in 2021.

Donut Factory offers dozen of doughnut varieties, as well as other pastries and desserts such as cakes, cinnamon rolls, crullers, fritters, maple bars, and ice cream sandwiches. The business has garnered a positive reception.

== Description ==
Donut Factory is a small chain of doughnut shops in the Seattle metropolitan area; the business has operated in Lynnwood and at the intersection of Roosevelt Way and Northeast 45th Street in Seattle's University District. The business' motto is "Donut worry, be happy".

=== Menu ===
Donut Factory serves doughnuts, cakes, cinnamon rolls, crullers, fritters, maple bars, and ice cream sandwiches with Fruity Pebbles, crumbled Oreos, and other toppings. There are approximately 80 doughnut varieties, including one filled with mango jelly, Bavarian cream, peanut butter and jelly, s'mores, smoky bacon, chocolate peppermint, ube, and others with Butterfinger, Ferrero Rocher, and Reese's Peanut Butter Cups as toppings. The glazed and cinnamon crobar has been described as a "flaky croissant-doughnut hybrid in bar form". Another option features cookie dough and Oreo crumbles between two glazed doughnut halves. Donut Factory has also offered "individual letter donuts the size of a cake", as well as ice cream floats. The business uses coffee from Pegasus Coffee Company.

== History ==
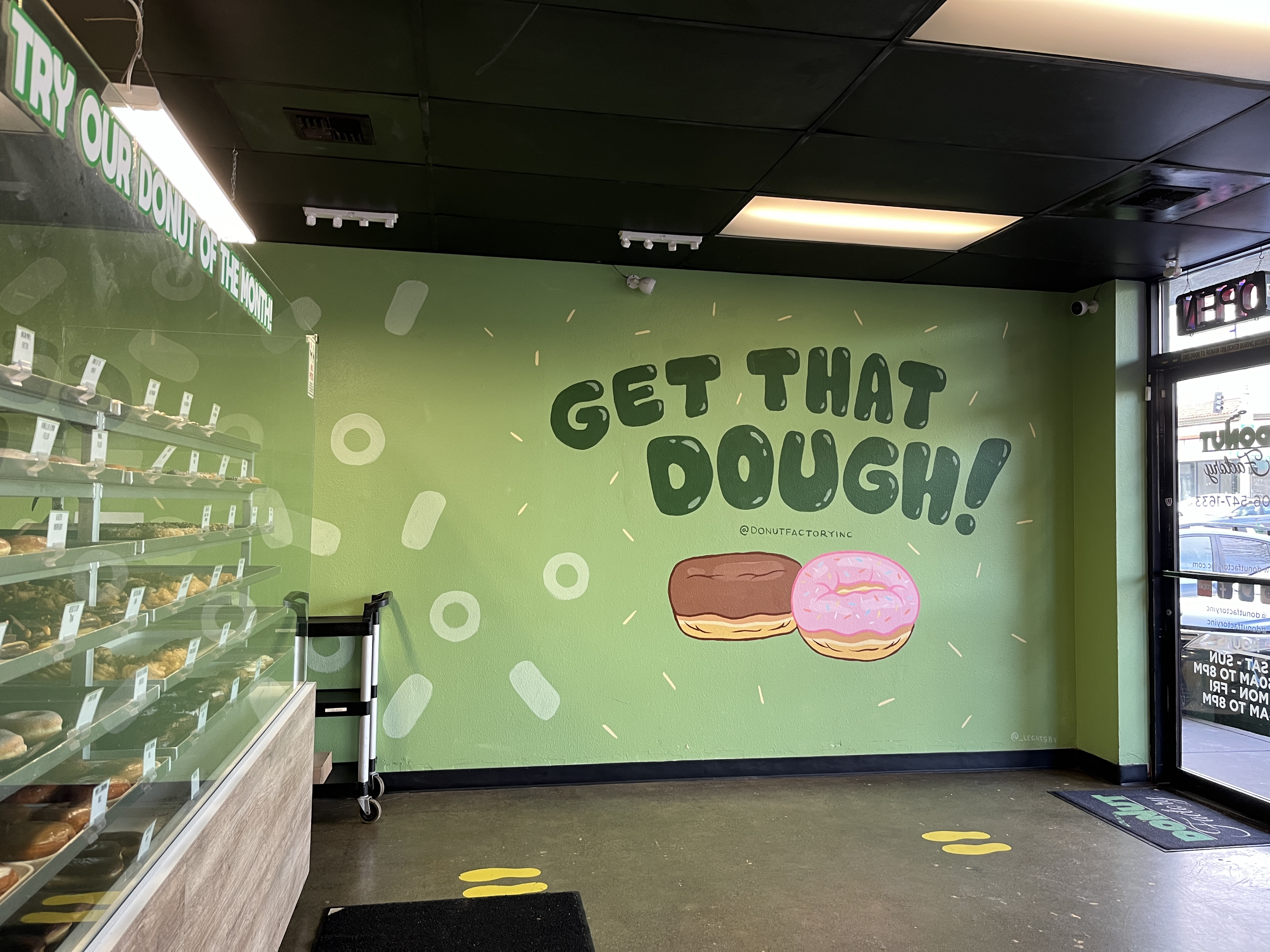
Interior of the University District shop

Donut Factory originally opened in Lynnwood. Marvin Crespo, Bryan Phaysith, and Marc Sapatin are co-owners. The business has been noted as Asian-owned, and carries an ube-glazed variety to commemorate Crespo's Filipino heritage. Donut Factory acquired a contract to serve the University of Washington Medical Center. Approximately 1,500 doughnuts were made daily at the Lynnwood shop as of 2021.

Approximately five years later after the Lynnwood shop opened, an outpost began operating at the intersection of Roosevelt Way and Northeast 45th Street in the University District in May 2021, in a space that previously housed Ly's Donuts. The outpost's seating capacity is 15 to 20 people. In 2023, the shop offered specials during the Cherry Blossom Festival on the campus of the University of Washington, and served blueberry and pumpkin doughnut varieties for the 'U District $4 Food Walk'. Donut Factory served cherry glazed ring doughnuts at the Cherry Blossom Festival in 2024.

== Reception ==
Donut Factory was the social media poll winner in Seattle Magazine's 2018 "smackdown" and overview of the city's best doughnuts. The Seattle Post-Intelligencer has called the doughnuts "nod-worthy".

== See also ==
- List of doughnut shops
