= Three Piece Sculpture: Vertebrae =

Sculpture by Henry Moore

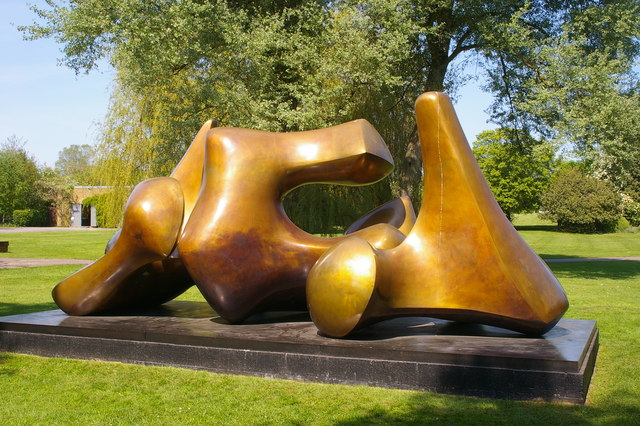
- Three Piece Sculpture: Vertebrae, Perry Green
- Artist: Henry Moore
- Year: 1968-1969
- Catalogue: LH 580
- Medium: Bronze
- Dimensions: 710 cm (280 in)
- Location: Perry Green

Three Piece Sculpture: Vertebrae (LH 580) is an abstract bronze sculpture by Henry Moore.

== LH 578 ==
The three part sculpture looks back to his earlier multi-part sculptures of human figures, and also his interlocking works such as Two Piece Sculpture No. 7: Pipe from 1966. Moore started with a plaster maquette in 1968 (LH 578), with three interlocking elements inspired by bones or flints.

== LH 579 ==
He created a second larger plaster working model, which was cast in bronze in 1968 as his Working Model for Three Piece No.3: Vertebrae (LH 579), in an edition of eight (plus an artist's copy, which is at the Tate Gallery in London). It measures 94 by 236.3 by 122 centimetres (37.0 in × 93.0 in × 48.0 in). Other casts are held by the Hirshhorn Museum and Sculpture Garden in Washington D.C., the Art Gallery of Ontario in Toronto, and Memorial Art Gallery in Rochester, New York, and the Nasher Sculpture Center in Dallas. Others are in private collections. One example was sold at Christie's in 2012 for over £5m.

== LH 580 ==
The working model was scaled up in 1968–69 into a full-size bronze sculpture, measuring 9 feet (2.7 m) x 24 feet (7.3 m) x 10 feet 7 inches (3.23 m) (LH 580). The full-size sculpture was cast in edition of three (plus one for the artist). One example is installed outside the Safeco Plaza (1001 4th Avenue) in Seattle, Washington. It was surveyed and deemed "well maintained" by the Smithsonian Institution's "Save Outdoor Sculpture!" program in May 1995. The others are at the Israel Museum in Jerusalem, and the Landesbausparkasse in Münster, with the artist's copy at the Henry Moore Foundation in Perry Green, Hertfordshire.

== LH 580a ==
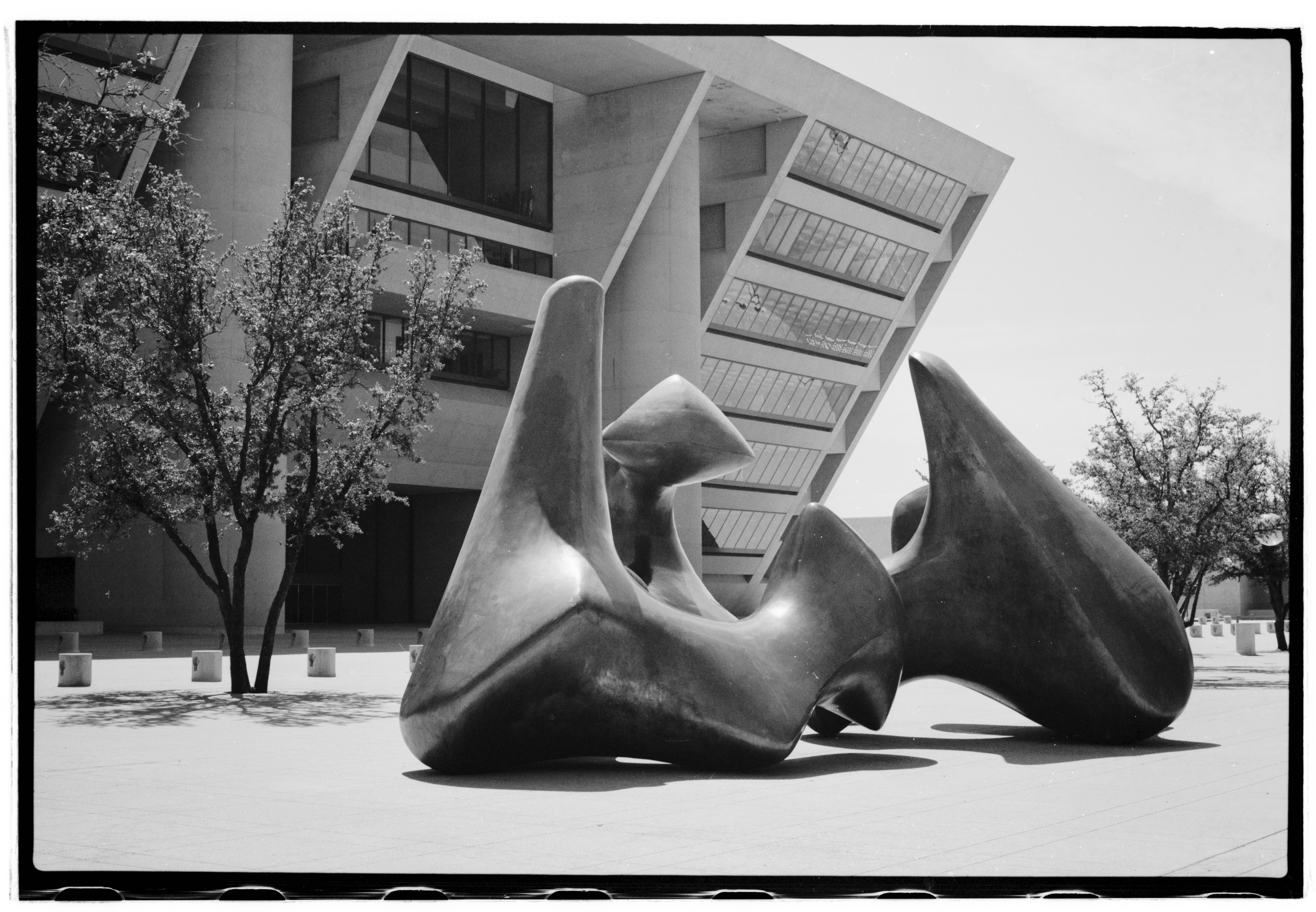
Dallas Piece

Three Forms Vertebrae (LH 580a), also known as Dallas Piece or Vertebrae, is an abstract bronze sculpture by Henry Moore. It was cast in 1978–79, specifically for a site outside I.M. Pei's Dallas City Hall, and is the largest version of a sculpture that Moore created in 1968. Moore was commissioned in 1978 to create a sculpture to stand in the City Centre Park Plaza outside the Dallas City Hall, for which he scaled up his 1968–69 work Three Piece Sculpture: Vertebrae (LH 580).

== See also ==
- Three-Piece No. 3: Vertebrae (working model)
- List of sculptures by Henry Moore
