= Safeco Plaza =

50-story skyscraper in Downtown Seattle, Washington

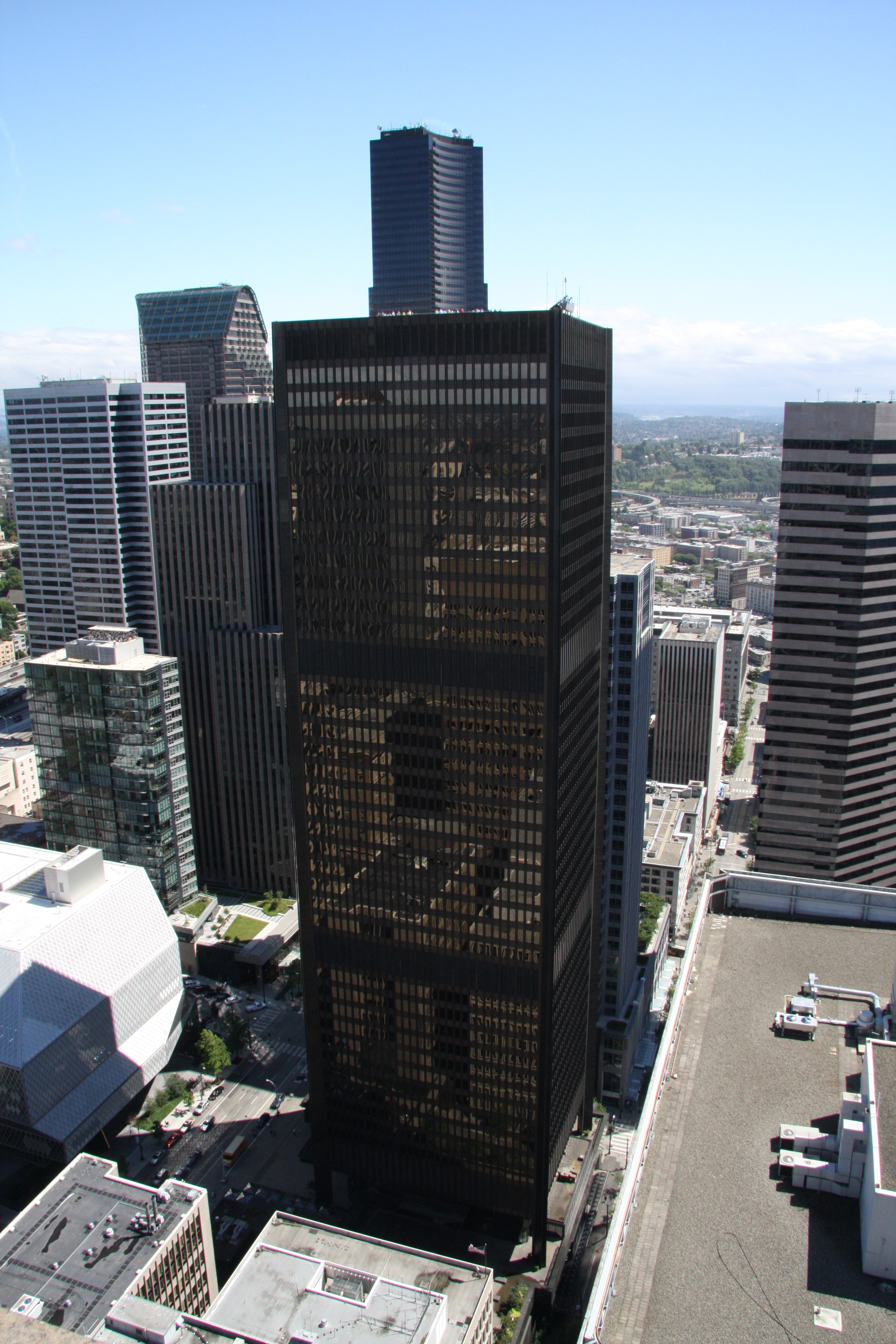
- Safeco Plaza viewed from the sundeck of Washington Mutual Tower in 2008; Columbia Center is directly behind it

- Location within downtown Seattle
- Alternative names: 1001 Fourth Avenue Plaza; Seafirst Building; Seattle First National Bank Building

Record height
- Tallest in Seattle and Washington state from 1969 to 1985^{[I]}
- Preceded by: Space Needle
- Surpassed by: Columbia Center

General information
- Type: Commercial offices
- Location: 1001 Fourth Avenue; Seattle, Washington, U.S.
- Coordinates: 47.6061°N 122.3341°W
- Construction started: 1966
- Completed: 1969
- Cost: $32 million
- Owner: Boston Properties

Height
- Roof: 630 ft (192 m)

Technical details
- Floor count: 50
- Floor area: 70,089 m^{2} (754,430 sq ft)
- Lifts/elevators: 18

Design and construction
- Architect: Naramore, Bain, Bray, and Johanson
- Structural engineer: Skilling Helle Christiansen and Robertson
- Main contractor: Howard S. Wright Construction Company

Website
- www.bxp.com/properties/safeco-plaza

Safeco Plaza (formerly known as 1001 Fourth Avenue Plaza, the Seafirst Building, and the Seattle-First National Bank Building) is a 50-story skyscraper in Downtown Seattle, Washington, United States. Designed by the Naramore, Bain, Brady, and Johanson (NBBJ) firm, it was completed in 1969 by the Howard S. Wright Construction Company for Seattle First National Bank (later known as Seafirst Bank), which relocated from its previous headquarters at the nearby Dexter Horton Building.

Standing at a height of 630 feet (192 m), Safeco Plaza was, upon completion, the tallest building (and structure) in Seattle, and the second-tallest building west of Mississippi River, behind 555 California Street in San Francisco. It dwarfed Smith Tower, which had been the tallest building since 1914, and edged out the Space Needle, the tallest structure since 1962, by 25 ft (7.6 m); the latter led locals to refer to the building as "The Box the Space Needle Came In". The building was surpassed by the Columbia Center in 1984; as of 2022, it is the seventh-tallest building in Seattle.

The building served as the headquarters of Seafirst until the bank moved into the Columbia Center upon its opening in 1985; in 2006, it became the headquarters of Safeco Insurance, which relocated from its previous headquarters in the University District.

== Design and amenities ==
The bronze-colored aluminum and glass structure was the first modern class-A office building in Seattle and is the first skyscraper in the world to feature a Vierendeel space frame. The structure includes a two-story lobby as well as a five-story subterranean garage. Other amenities include 15,000 square feet (1,400 m^{2}) of ground-floor retail featuring a fitness center, a bank, some restaurants, a medical center, and a post office. The building also has a rooftop helipad, one of twelve in the city.

Prominent among its restaurants was the Mirabeau, which was situated on the 46th floor. The landmark restaurant closed in 1991 following a business downturn.

The eastern plaza in front of the building is home to Three Piece Sculpture: Vertebrae, an abstract bronze sculpture by Henry Moore that was part of a three-piece series. It was installed by previous tenant Seafirst Bank in 1971 and was planned to be removed after being sold in 1986, but was saved with a donation by the Bank of America (Seafirst's successor) to the Seattle Art Museum following public outcry.

== History ==
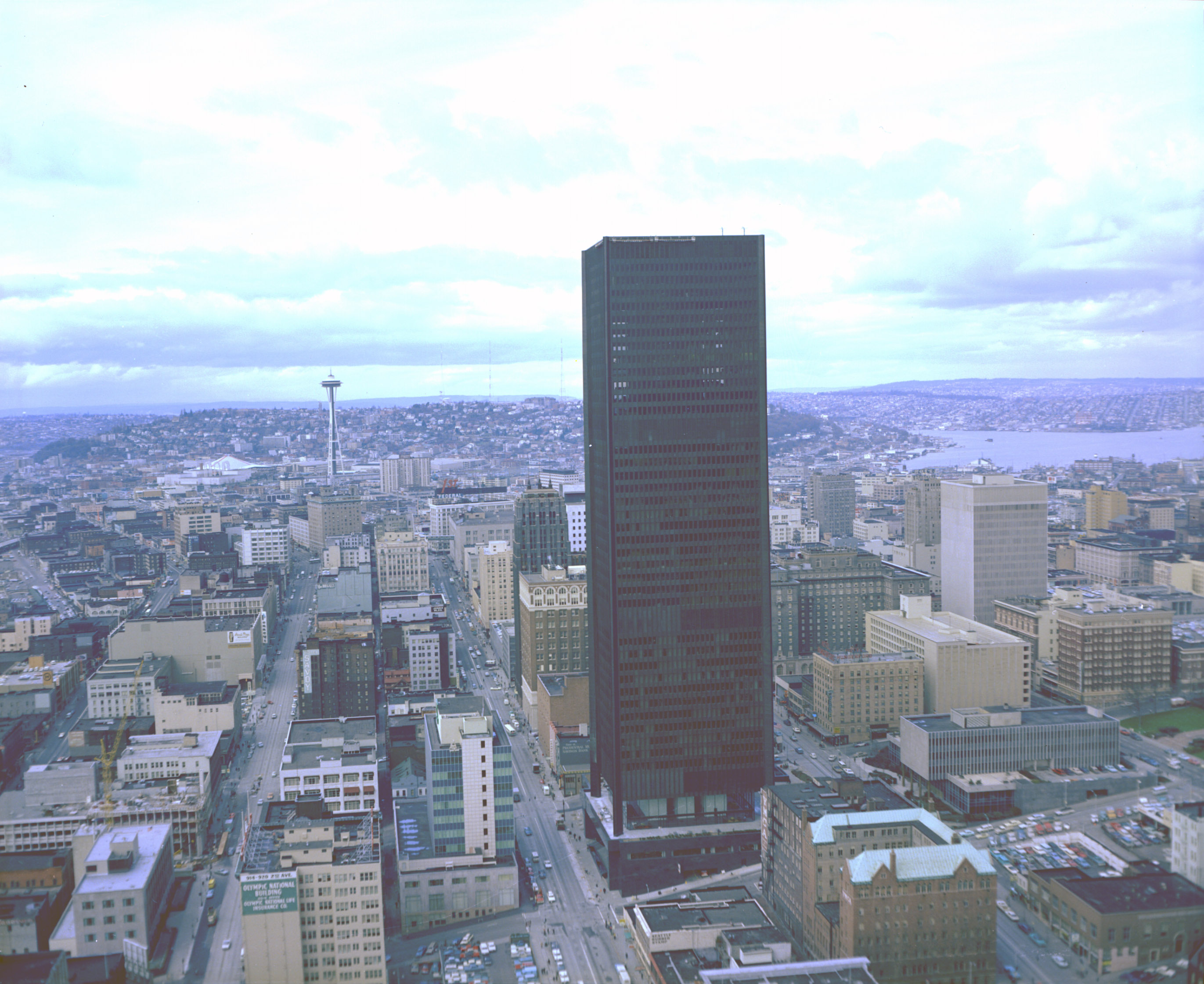
The "Seattle First National Bank Building" in 1969.

Originally the headquarters of Seafirst Bank, it was sold fourteen years later to JMB Realty in 1983 for $123 million, a record for a Seattle building. The building was purchased by Seafo Inc., a company affiliated with the New York State Common Retirement Fund, in 1993. Hines and the CalPERS retirement system purchased 1001 Fourth Avenue Plaza in May 2005 for $162 million, with plans for $30 million in renovations to attract a new major client.

Safeco Insurance Company of America leased 284,000 square feet (26,400 m^{2}) of the building on May 23, 2006, to be its headquarters after moving from its former building in the University District and consolidating its Redmond office. The company subsequently renamed it to Safeco Plaza. In 2015, Safeco announced that it would consolidate more offices into the tower, increasing its lease from 17 to 26 floors.

In July 2016, German firm GLL Real Estate Partners GmbH and South Korean firm Vestas Investment Management bought Safeco Plaza for $387 million. The firms sold the building in 2021 to Boston Properties for $465 million. A major renovation of the tower's lobby and amenity spaces was announced in July 2023 and is scheduled to be completed by 2024. A longue, fitness center, and conference rooms are set to be added as part of the project; a bicycle hub on 3rd Avenue will replace a retail space occupied by Mel's Market until 2020.

== Major tenants ==
- Safeco Insurance
- Bank of America
- Fox Rothschild (formerly Riddell Williams)
- Helsell Fetterman
- Fehr & Peers
- Interior Architects
- Business Service Center, Inc
- Bain & Company
- University of Washington
- Aedas Architects

== See also ==
- Seafirst Bank
- List of tallest buildings in Seattle
