= Roosevelt station (Sound Transit) =

Light rail station in Seattle, Washington

46 Roosevelt
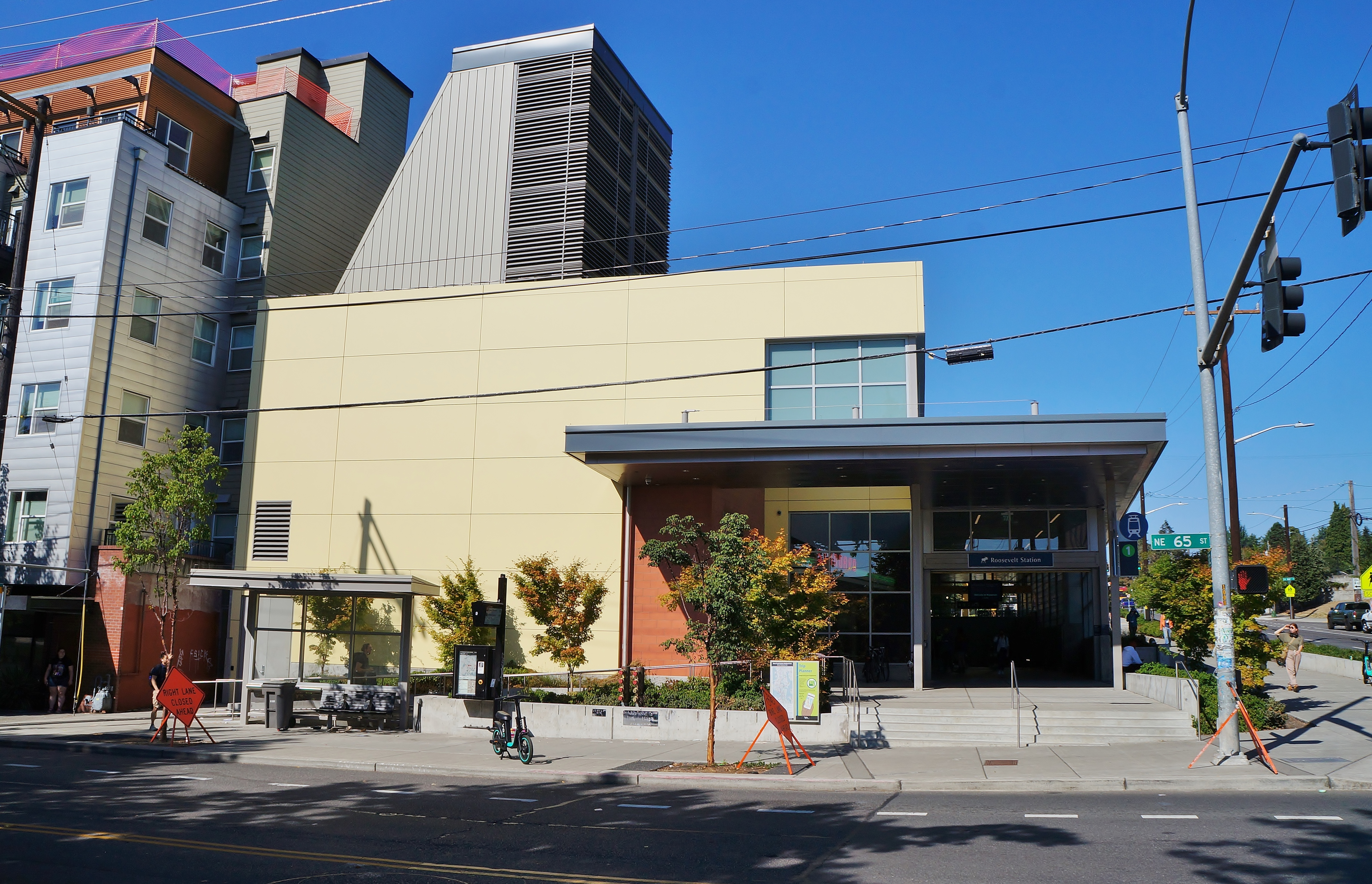
- South entrance at Northeast 65th Street

General information
- Location: 6501 12th Avenue Northeast; Seattle, Washington; United States
- Coordinates: 47°40′36″N 122°18′56″W
- System: Link light rail
- Owner: Sound Transit
- Platforms: 1 island platform
- Tracks: 2
- Connections: King County Metro; Sound Transit Express

Construction
- Structure type: Underground
- Cycle facilities: Bicycle parking cage, lockers, and racks
- Accessible: Yes

History
- Opened: October 2, 2021

Passengers
- 3,993 daily weekday boardings (2025); 1,347,400 total boardings (2025)

Services
Preceding station	Sound Transit	Following station
Link
Northgate toward Lynnwood City Center	1 Line	U District toward Federal Way Downtown
Northgate toward Lynnwood City Center	2 Line	U District toward Downtown Redmond
Location

Roosevelt station is a light rail station located in the Roosevelt neighborhood of Seattle, Washington, United States. It is served by the 1 Line and 2 Line of Sound Transit's Link light rail system. The underground station consists of a single island platform connected to the surface via a mezzanine and two entrances along 12th Avenue Northeast at Northeast 65th and 67th streets.

Construction on the Northgate extension was approved by voters in a 2008 ballot measure and began in 2012. Two tunnel boring machines used to build the light rail tunnels arrived at Roosevelt station in 2015, on their way between Northgate and the University District. The station opened on October 2, 2021.

== Location ==
Roosevelt station is located on the west side of 12th Avenue Northeast between Northeast 65th Street and Northeast 67th Street, at the heart of the Roosevelt urban village in northern Seattle. It is adjacent to the Roosevelt Square shopping center and Roosevelt High School, with the immediate area constituting the commercial and retail core of the neighborhood. The station is also located near Ravenna Park and Green Lake, two of the largest parks in North Seattle.

Northeast 66th Street, which lies between the station's two entrances, was rebuilt as a "green street" with traffic calming pedestrian-friendly features. A southbound protected bike lane was installed on Roosevelt Way between NE 65th Street and the University Bridge in 2016, while the northbound lane on 11th and 12th avenues was put on hold due to the truncation of the RapidRide J Line. A set of east–west protected lanes were installed on NE 65th Street in 2019 between Ravenna Boulevard and 20th Avenue NE.

=== Transit-oriented development ===
The area surrounding the station consists of varied uses, including commercial and retail spaces along Roosevelt Way, 12th Avenue NE, and NE 65th Street. The largest land use is single-family homes, though multi-family residential buildings have been constructed in the 2010s in anticipation of light rail service. Within a 1/2-mile (0.80 km) radius of the station, over 8,400 residents and 3,000 jobs were counted in 2013 by the Puget Sound Regional Council. In 2016, residential real estate website Redfin named Roosevelt one of the nation's "hottest neighborhoods", citing recent growth in real estate prices and interest in local properties, and credited the future light rail station in that interest. From 2016 to 2021, an estimated 1,626 housing units were constructed in the Roosevelt urban village and another 624 are permitted or under construction.

In January 2012, the Seattle City Council approved a rezoning of the Roosevelt neighborhood to allow for residential buildings of up to 85 feet (26 m) adjacent to the station and 40 feet (12 m) in the surrounding 40-block area. While the neighborhood was supportive of light rail construction and siting the station in the urban village, residents asked for a shorter 40 feet (12 m) height limit to preserve views of Roosevelt High School.

Several parcels used for construction staging at Roosevelt station was opened up for transit-oriented development in 2020. Sound Transit and the Seattle Office Housing offered $15 million in funds for affordable housing on the site to non-profit developers Bellwether Housing and Mercy Housing Northwest, who were selected in 2017. The project, named Cedar Crossing, consists of 254 units reserved for low-income households (including multi-bedroom units), a child care center operated by El Centro de la Raza, and a care center for homeless families operated by Mary's Place. Construction began in 2020 and was completed in 2022.

== History ==
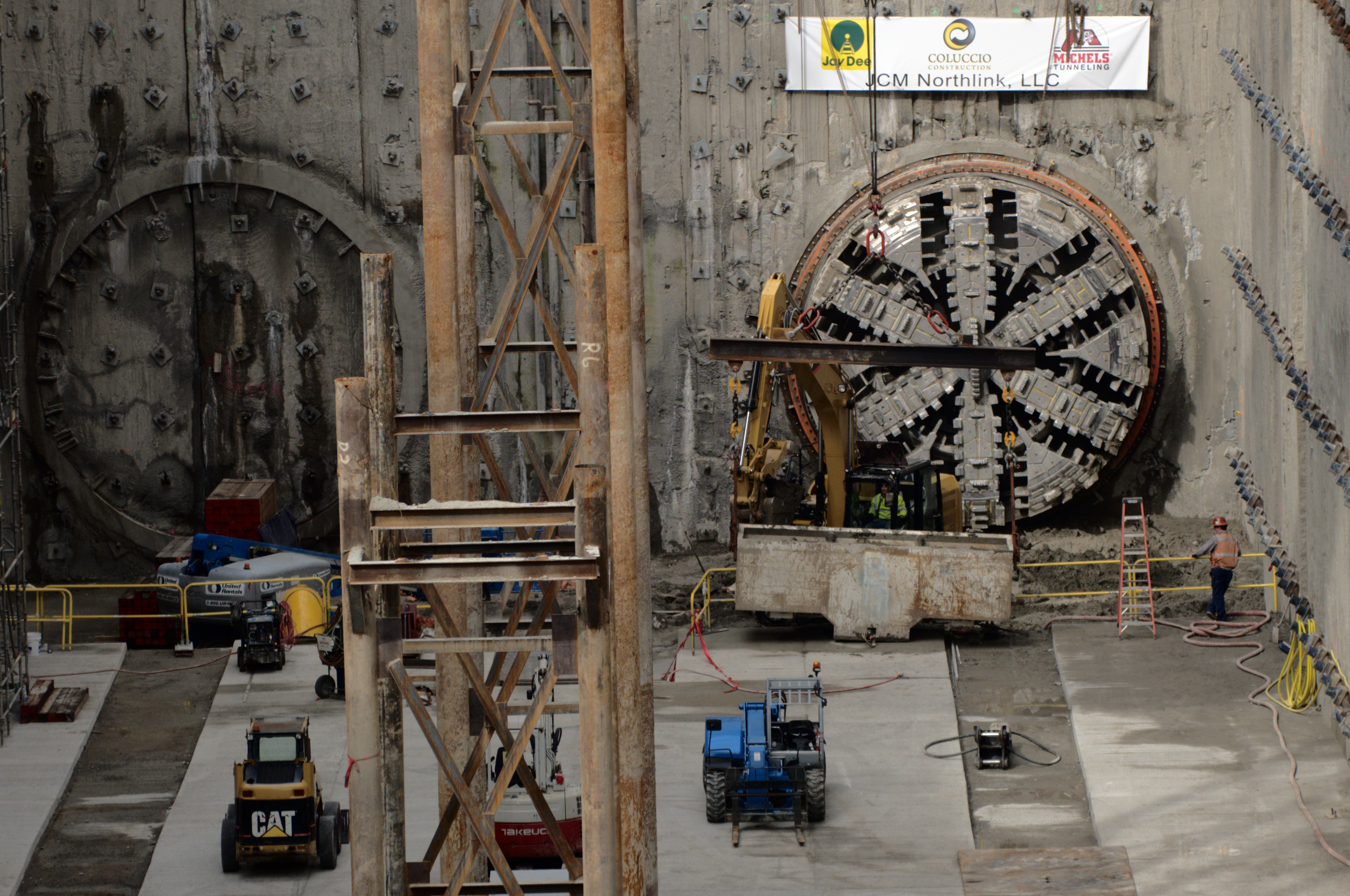
Tunnel boring machine head at Roosevelt Station, 2015

Proposals for rapid transit service through the Roosevelt neighborhood date back to the early 20th century, when the area was near the northern city limits of Seattle. In 1911, Virgil Bogue proposed an extensive rapid transit system, including an underground subway following 10th Avenue Northeast from Northeast 85th Street south towards Latona (the present-day University District) and Downtown Seattle. The proposal was rejected by voters the following year, but an un-adopted 1926 plan from the Planning Commission included rapid transit service to Ravenna Park and the University District. The Forward Thrust plan of the late 1960s proposed building a four-line rapid transit network using $385 million in local funding to augment a larger federal contribution. One of the proposed lines, traveling between Downtown Seattle and Lake City, included a station adjacent to Roosevelt High School at Brooklyn Avenue NE and NE 65th Street. The plan was put before voters on two occasions, in February 1968 and May 1970, and failed to gain the needed supermajority to pass.

In the 1990s, the formation of a regional transit authority (RTA) brought light rail planning to the Seattle region. In 1995, the transit authority proposed a regional light rail system to be built by 2010, including an at-grade or underground light rail line through Roosevelt with a station in the neighborhood. The RTA proposal was rejected by voters in March 1995, citing its $6.7 billion price. A smaller, $3.9 billion plan was approved in November 1996, only funding light rail from the University District to Seattle–Tacoma International Airport; an extension north to Northgate via Roosevelt was deferred until additional funding could be secured. In 1997, the RTA (since re-branded as Sound Transit) began exploring alignment options for the Northgate segment, with residents voicing their opposition to at-grade or elevated alignments in favor of an underground route. Following several rounds of public hearings in 2000, the Sound Transit Board narrowed down the routing options to a tunnel under 12th Avenue and an elevated alignment along Interstate 5 to the west of Roosevelt's commercial district, each with a station at Northeast 65th Street. Community and business groups in Roosevelt favored an underground alignment, while then Seattle mayor Greg Nickels supported the elevated station, which was less costly and closer to the Green Lake neighborhood. On January 28, 2005, the Sound Transit Board unanimously approved an underground alignment with a station along 12th Avenue NE between NE 65th and 67th streets, citing a smaller-than-expected difference in cost compared to the elevated option near Interstate 5.

Funding for the Northgate extension of Link light rail, then known as "North Link", was included in the 2007 Roads and Transit ballot measure, which was put before voters in November 2007. The combined $18 billion proposal was rejected, with environmentalist groups disavowing it over the roadworks portion that sought to expand regional highways. A second, transit-only measure known as "Sound Transit 2" was approved by voters in November 2008, securing funding for a light rail extension to Northgate and further north to Lynnwood. The North Link project was approved by the Sound Transit Board in June 2012, setting a $2.1 billion budget and expected completion date of 2021. The contract for tunneling and station construction was awarded to JCM Northlink LLC (a joint venture of Jay Dee, Coluccio, and Michels) for $462 million in 2013. Demolition of a QFC supermarket on the site began in May 2012, while buildings on 12th Avenue NE, including the Standard Records building, were also demolished later in the year. Townhouses on NE 66th Street were relocated to 15th Ave NE. Sound Transit broke ground on the Northgate Link Extension project on August 17, 2012, at a ceremony on the future site of Roosevelt station. The majority of design work for Roosevelt station was completed in 2014 and 2015.

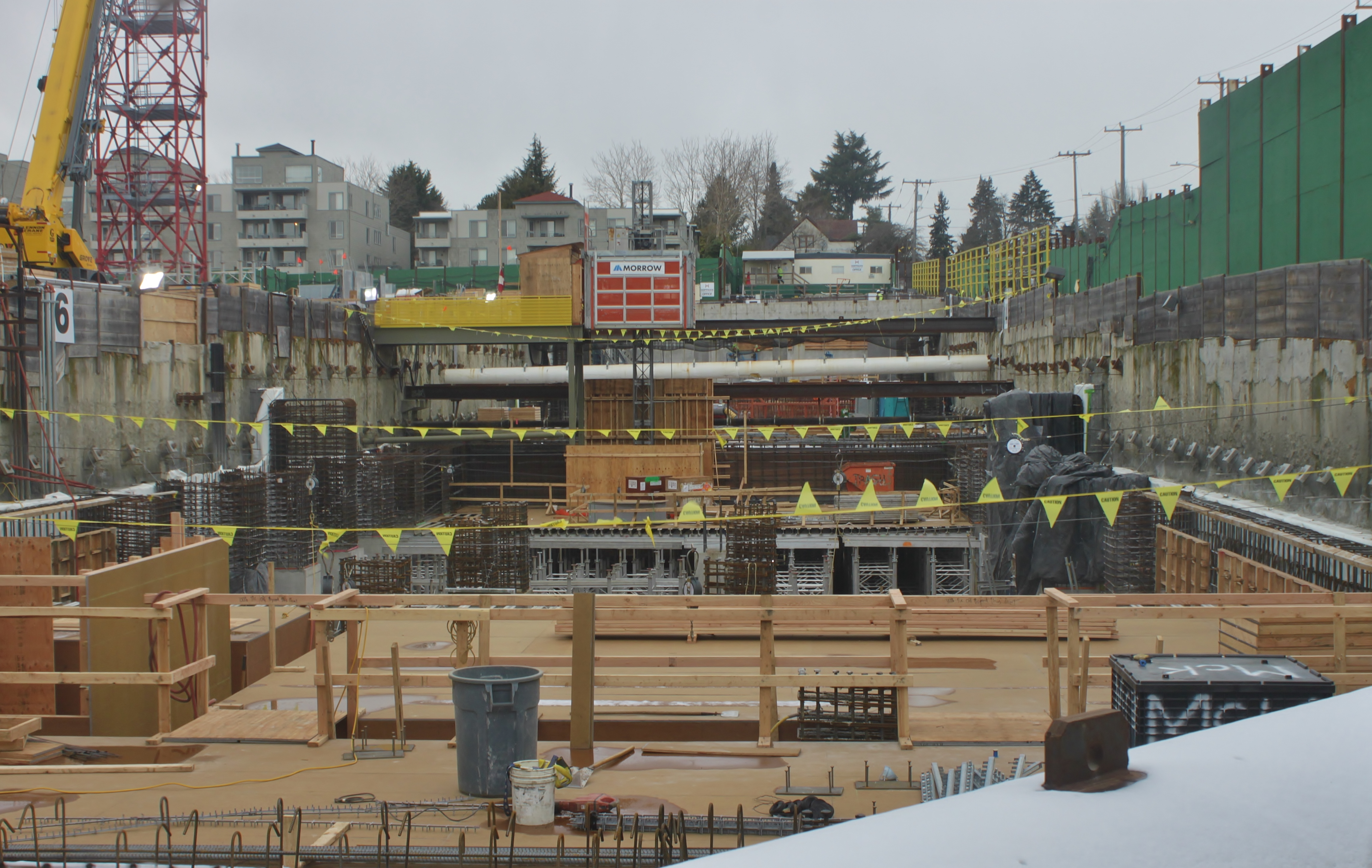
Station construction in February 2018

Tunnel boring machines for the project were launched from the north end near Northgate station in July and November 2014. The two machines arrived at Roosevelt station in March and July 2015, respectively, completing the first 1.5 miles (2.4 km) of the 3.4-mile-long (5.5 km) tunnel between Northgate and University of Washington station. Both machines continued south towards U District station, arriving in November 2015 and March 2016, respectively. During construction of cross-passages for the two tunnels south of Roosevelt in May 2016, a small sinkhole formed in the front yard of a house.

Hoffman Construction was awarded a $152 million contract in November 2016 to build the station's floor and supporting structures. Construction on Roosevelt station's interior structures began in early 2017 and reached street level the following year. The construction site's prominent 280-foot (85 m) tower crane, nicknamed "Big Red", was dismantled in March 2019. Construction of the station was declared substantially complete in February 2021. Roosevelt station opened on October 2, 2021, with a community festival featuring live performances and a food truck at the Northeast 66th Street plaza. The 2 Line entered simulated service on February 14, 2026, with passengers able to board trains from Lynnwood to International District/Chinatown station.

== Station layout ==
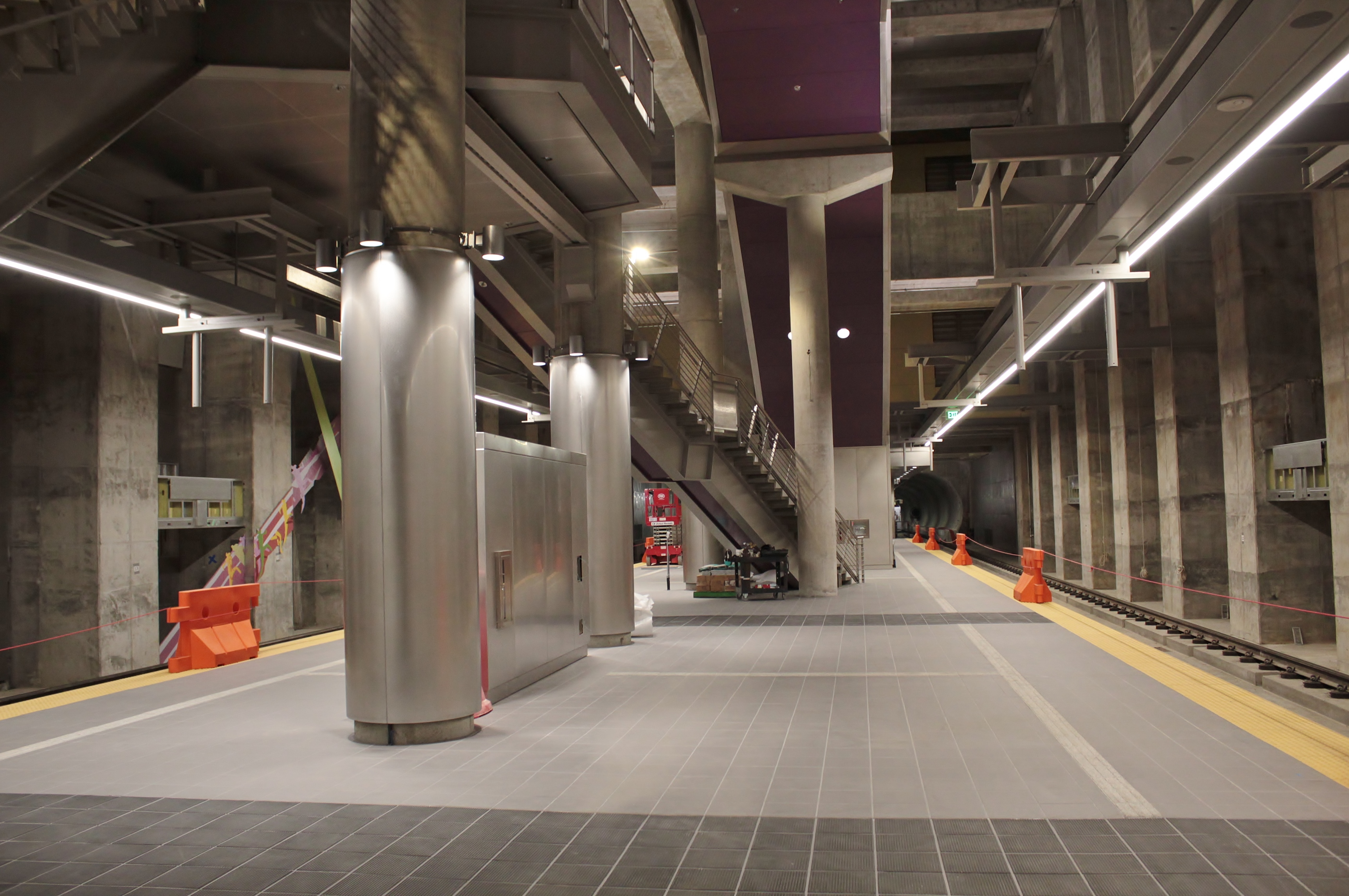
Platform level view in December 2019, prior to opening

Roosevelt station is located on the west side of 12th Avenue Northeast on two blocks between NE 65th and 67th streets, with entrances at the two cross streets; they are labeled Exit A for the north entrance at Northeast 67th Street and Exit B for the south entrance at Northeast 65th Street. Both entrances have ticket vending machines and each have a pair of emergency ventilation shafts. The underground station has two lower levels, connected to the entrances by a series of stairs, escalators, and elevators: a mezzanine and the 380-foot-long (120 m) island platform, located at a depth of 80 feet (24 m). The area between the entrances includes a public plaza on Northeast 66th Street and an enclosed bicycle parking cage with 74 spaces. The station was designed by Hewitt Architects, which also worked on Northgate station.

=== Art ===
Public art is integrated into the station's design under the "STart" program, which allocates a percentage of project construction funds to art projects to be used in stations. Lead artist Christian French coordinated the project, while R & R Studios and Luca Buvoli created permanent art installations inside and outside the station. The station's outdoor plaza at 12th Avenue Northeast and Northeast 66th Street includes Building Blocks, a 49-foot (15 m), three-tiered stepped pyramid by R & R Studios that is primarily painted gold. Buvoli's Mo-Mo-Motion on the platform and mezzanine consists of several abstract depictions of cyclists and runners inspired by the works of the Italian Futurism movement. The south entrance's ticketing area is home to the preserved façade of the Standard Records building, which was demolished for the station, including the restored neon sign.

Roosevelt station was represented in maps and signage by a pictogram that depicted a moose. The pictogram series was retired in 2024 and replaced by station numbers.

== Services ==
The station is served by the 1 Line and 2 Line, both part of the Link light rail system. Roosevelt is situated between Northgate and U District stations; it is the fifth southbound station from Lynnwood City Center, the northern terminus of both lines. Link light rail trains serve Roosevelt station 20 hours a day on weekdays and Saturdays, from 5:00 a.m. to 12:00 a.m.; and 18 hours on Sundays, from 6:00 a.m. to 12:00 a.m. During regular weekday service, trains on each line operate roughly every eight minutes during rush hour, ten minutes during midday operation, and twelve to fifteen minutes in the early morning and at night. On weekends, trains on each line arrive at Roosevelt station every ten minutes during midday hours and every twelve to fifteen minutes during mornings and evenings. The two lines combine for frequencies of four minutes during rush hour and five minutes during midday and weekend service. The station is approximately 12 minutes from Westlake station in Downtown Seattle, 39 minutes from Bellevue Downtown station, and 50 minutes from SeaTac/Airport station. In 2025, an average of 3,993 passengers boarded Link trains at Roosevelt station on weekdays.

Roosevelt station is also served by several King County Metro buses that provide onward connections to surrounding neighborhoods. The station has five bus bays, primarily on Roosevelt Way and Northeast 65th Street; the final bus bay, on Roosevelt Way at Northeast 66th Street, opened in March 2023. King County Metro operates six routes from Roosevelt station with connections to the University District, Greenwood, Fremont, Lake City, Sand Point, Northgate, South Lake Union, and Downtown Seattle. Sound Transit Express route 522, serving the State Route 522 corridor through Kenmore, Bothell, and Woodinville, terminated at the station until 2026.

Metro had planned to operate the RapidRide J Line between the station and Downtown Seattle on Roosevelt Way and 12th Avenue Northeast until it was truncated to U District station.
