= Dexter Horton Building =

Building in Seattle, Washington, U.S.

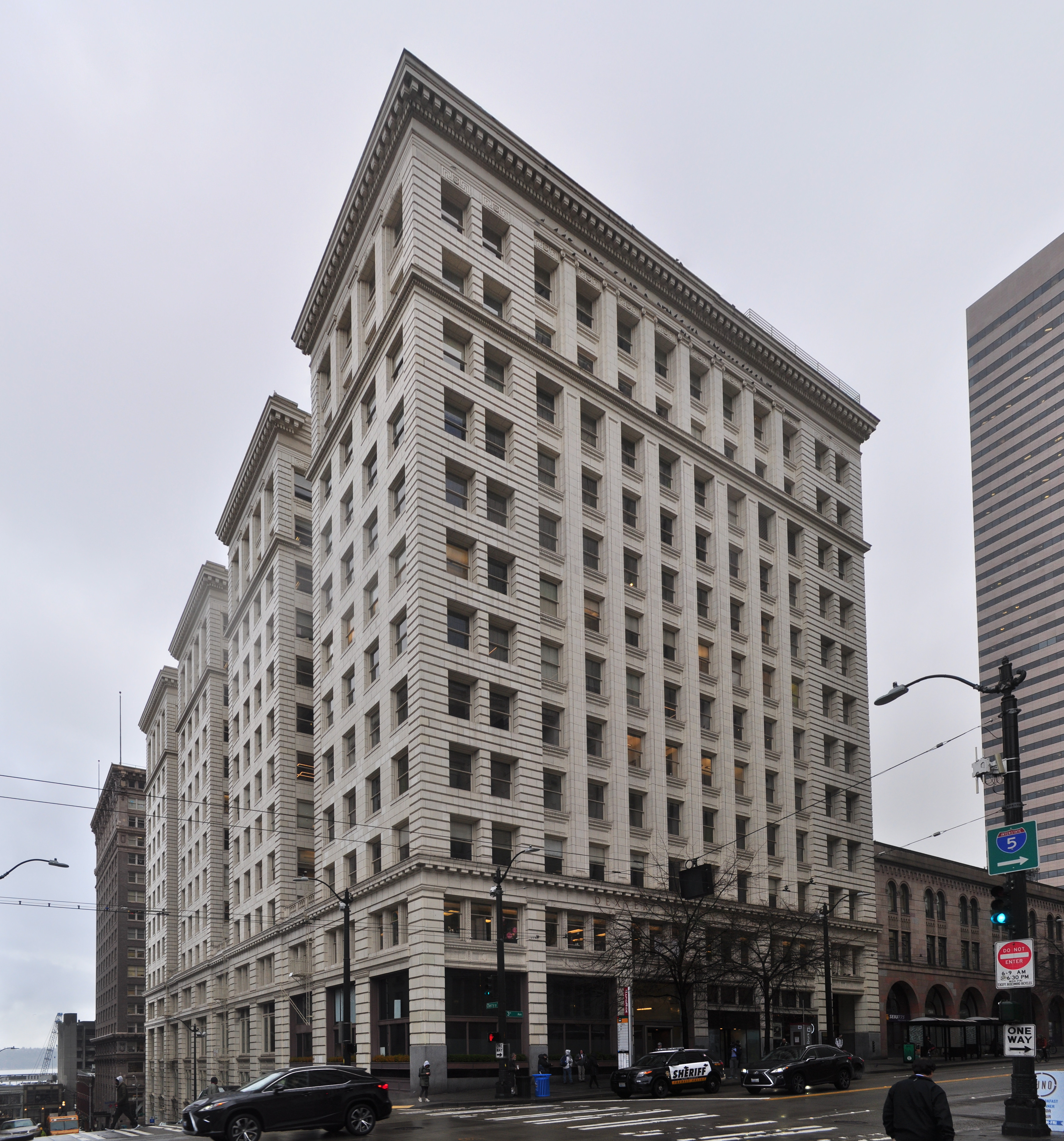
- The building's exterior in 2018
- Interactive map of the Dexter Horton Building area

General information
- Location: Seattle, Washington, United States
- Coordinates: 47°36′13″N 122°19′58″W

The Dexter Horton Building (710 2nd Avenue) is a 15-story office building in Seattle, Washington, United States. It is located at the intersection of 2nd Avenue and Cherry Street in Downtown Seattle and was the headquarters of the Seattle First National Bank (Seafirst) until it built a new building, now known as Safeco Plaza, in 1969. The building was opened in 1924 and designed by John Graham. It underwent seismic renovations in 2002 and was sold to Gerding Edlen in 2013 for $76.6 million. The building was later sold in 2015 to a subsidiary of Great Eagle Holdings for $124.4 million. CIM Group purchased the building for $151 million in 2019; it was the third time the Dexter Horton Building had been sold in a five-year period. On June 11, 2024, the building was sold again at a steep discount to King County as CIM went into default.

Pegasus Coffee opened in the building as the first specialty coffee bar in downtown Seattle in 1983.
