= Three-Piece No. 3: Vertebrae (Working Model) =

Sculpture by Henry Moore

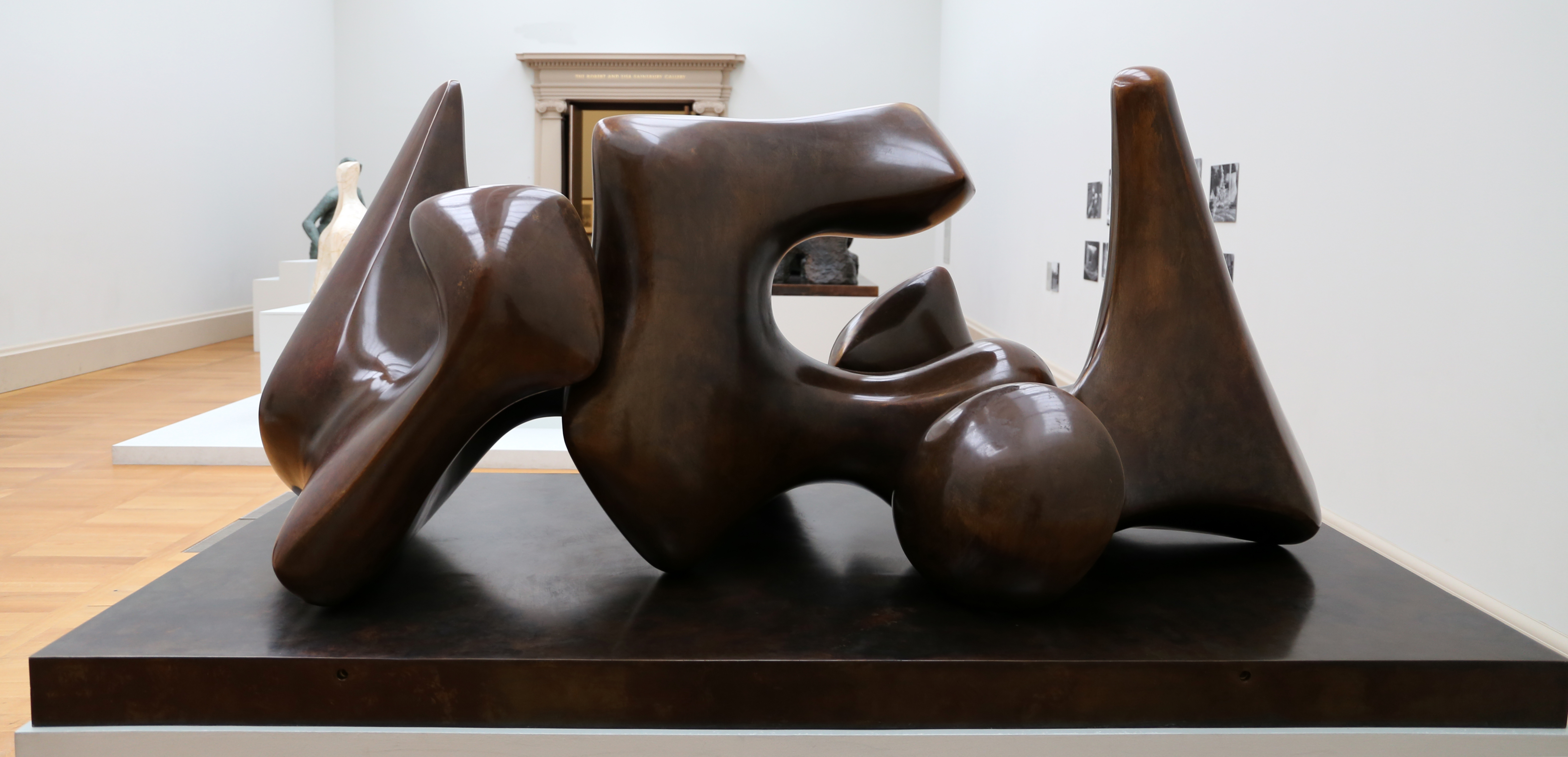
- Artist's copy in the Tate collection
- Artist: Henry Moore
- Year: 1968
- Catalogue: LH 579
- Type: Bronze
- Dimensions: 234 cm (92 in)

Three-Piece No. 3: Vertebrae (Working Model) is a bronze sculpture by Henry Moore. It was cast in 1968 as in edition of 8, along with an artist's copy which is now part of the Tate collection. One of the eight casts is in the Hirshhorn Museum and Sculpture Garden.

== Description ==
The sculpture refers to bones, which Moore collected.

Each of the forms, although different, has the same basic shape. Just as in a backbone which may be made up of twenty segments where each one is roughly like the others but not exactly the same…This is why I call these sculptures Vertebrae. The two or three forms are basically alike but are arranged to go with each other in different positions. The sculptor’s life is one of thinking, reacting, or making, expressing himself through form, through shape – for me the three-dimensional world is unending.

== See also ==
- List of sculptures by Henry Moore
- Three Piece Sculpture: Vertebrae
