= Safeco =

Former American insurance company based in Seattle

Safeco Insurance
- Formerly: General Insurance Company of America
- Type: Subsidiary
- Industry: Insurance
- Predecessor: American States Financial Corporation; Washington Mutual's WM Life Insurance Company; R.F. Bailey
- Founded: Seattle, Washington (1923)
- Founder: Hawthorne K. Dent
- Defunct: April 25, 2026
- Fate: Merged into Liberty Mutual, brand retired
- Headquarters: Seattle, Washington, United States
- Products: Insurance; Auto insurance Homeowners insurance Liability insurance

Safeco Logo

Safeco Insurance was an American insurance company based in Seattle. A subsidiary of Liberty Mutual, Safeco provided auto insurance, homeowners insurance, and liability insurance. The company name was an acronym for Selective Auto and Fire Ensurance Company of America, or SAFECO (i.e., S.A.F.E. Co.).

== History ==
Safeco was founded in 1923 by Hawthorne Kingsbury Dent (1880-1958) as the General Insurance Company of America, a property and casualty insuring company, with a headquarters in Downtown Seattle at the corner of University Street and Fourth Avenue. In 1936, it moved to the eight-story Brooklyn Building at the corner of N.E. 45th Street and Brooklyn Avenue N.E. in the University District, Seattle. In 1953, it formed a subsidiary, the "Selective Auto and Fire Ensurance Company of America," or SAFECO.

General Insurance began to sell life insurance in 1957. In 1968, it changed its name from the General Insurance Company of America to Safeco Corporation. Around the same time the company began to offer mutual funds and commercial credit, though precursors to the Safeco Funds had been around since the 1930s.

Safeco replaced the Brooklyn Building with the 22-story Safeco Plaza (now UW Tower) building in 1973. It remains the tallest building in the city outside Downtown.

In January 1987, it sold its title insurance business to Chicago Title for $30.7 million cash and $46 million in a 7-year promissory note.

In 1997, Safeco acquired American States Financial Corporation from Lincoln National Corporation for $2.8 billion, expanding beyond the West Coast. Washington Mutual's WM Life Insurance Company was purchased the same year. In 1999, Safeco bought R.F. Bailey (Underwriting Agencies) Limited of London.

In 2001, new management was brought in to restructure the company. Commercial credit operations were sold to GE Capital in August 2001.

In August 2004, the company sold its life insurance and investments business to a group of private investors led by Safeco board members, Warren Buffett's Berkshire Hathaway, and White Mountains Insurance Group, incorporating as Symetra. Hub International acquired Safeco's insurance brokerage operations. Mellon Financial acquired Safeco Trust Company, its private bank. Also in 2004, the company sold its land title insurance business to First American Corporation.

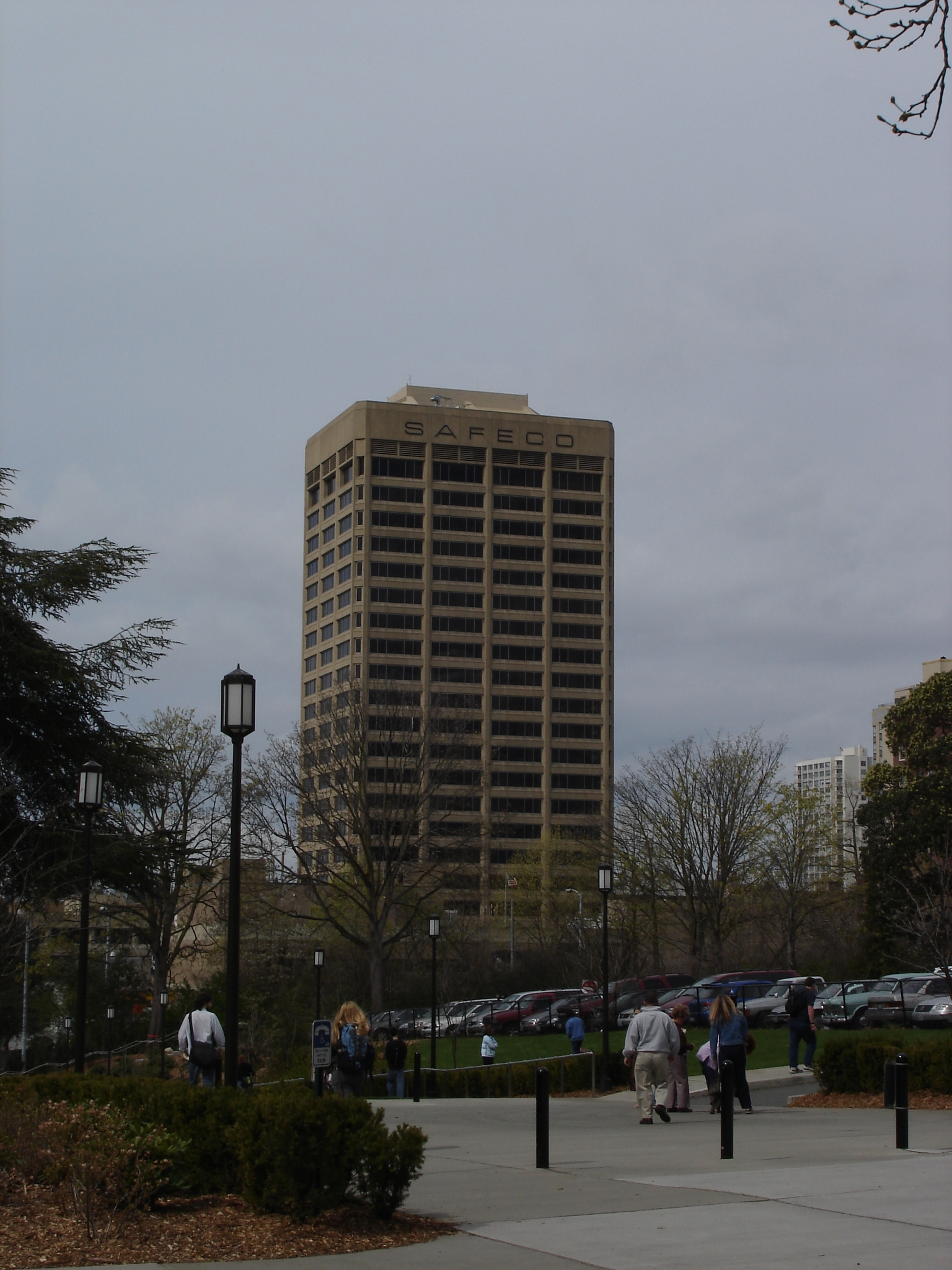
The former Safeco Plaza, now UW Tower

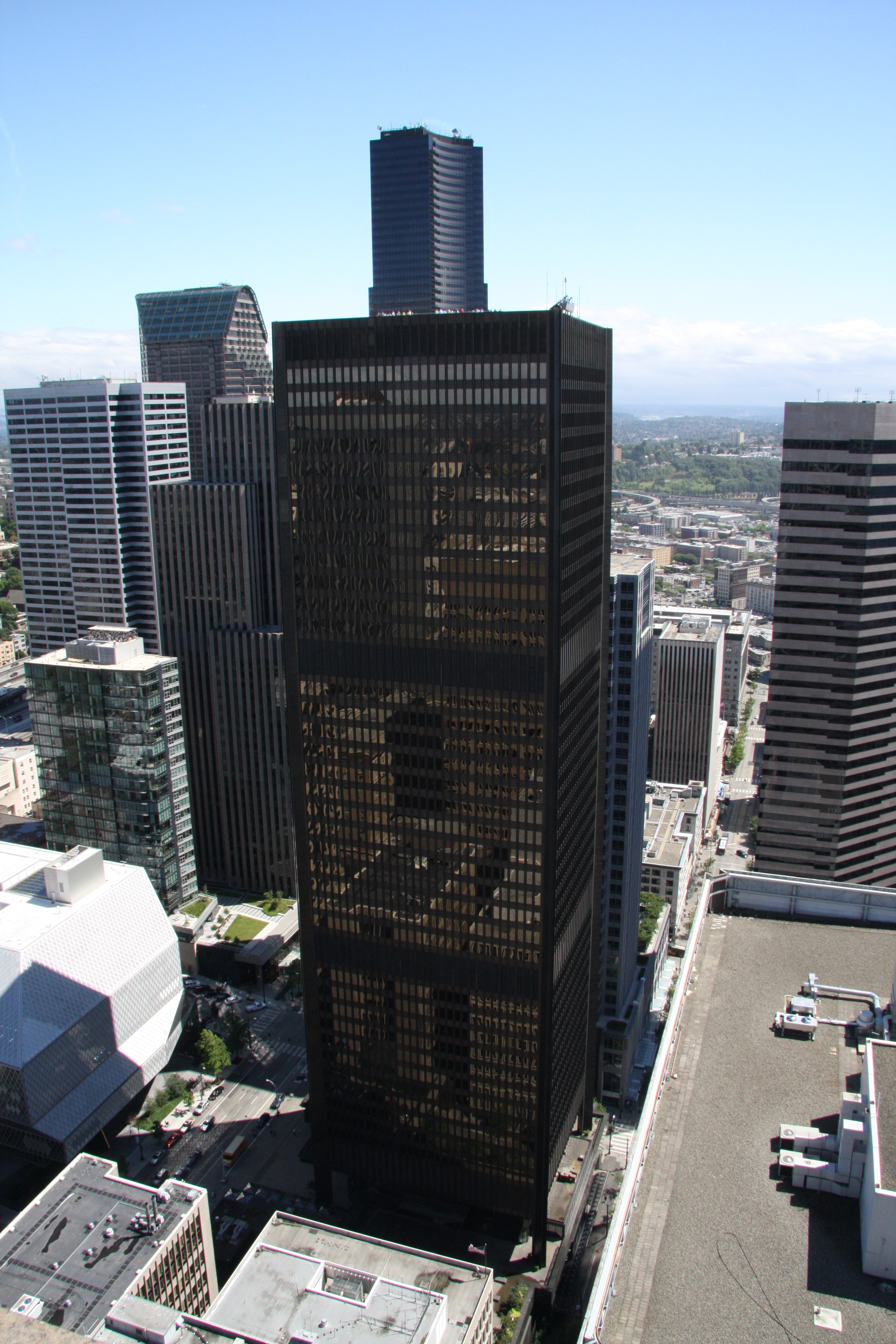
The current Safeco Plaza, originally the Seafirst Building.

In July 2005, CEO Mike McGavick stepped down as CEO to run in the 2006 United States Senate election in Washington.

In May 2006, Assurant acquired Safeco Financial Institution Solutions.

In 2006, Microsoft acquired the company's Redmond campus for $209.5 million. The University District complex was sold to the University of Washington for $130 million. Safeco moved back downtown in 2007; its new headquarters at 1001 Fourth Avenue became the new Safeco Plaza, and the former Safeco Plaza was renamed UW Tower.

In May 2007, BlackRock assumed management of the company's $10.5 billion investment portfolio.

In September 2008, the company was acquired by Liberty Mutual Insurance for $6.2 billion in cash.

In February 2010, Safeco donated more than 800 pieces of its art collection, valued at $3.5 million, to a consortium of museums, the Washington Art Consortium.

In March 2025 Liberty Mutual announced that it was retiring the Safeco brand in 2026. This became effective on April 25, 2026.

== Sponsorships ==
Safeco held the naming rights to the Seattle Mariners' baseball stadium from its opening in July 1999 through the 2018 season. The company also sponsored the Safeco Classic, a women's professional golf tournament on the LPGA Tour from 1982 through 1999; it was held in September at the Meridian Valley Country Club in Kent.
