= Pegasus Coffee Company =

Coffee company based in the U.S. state of Washington

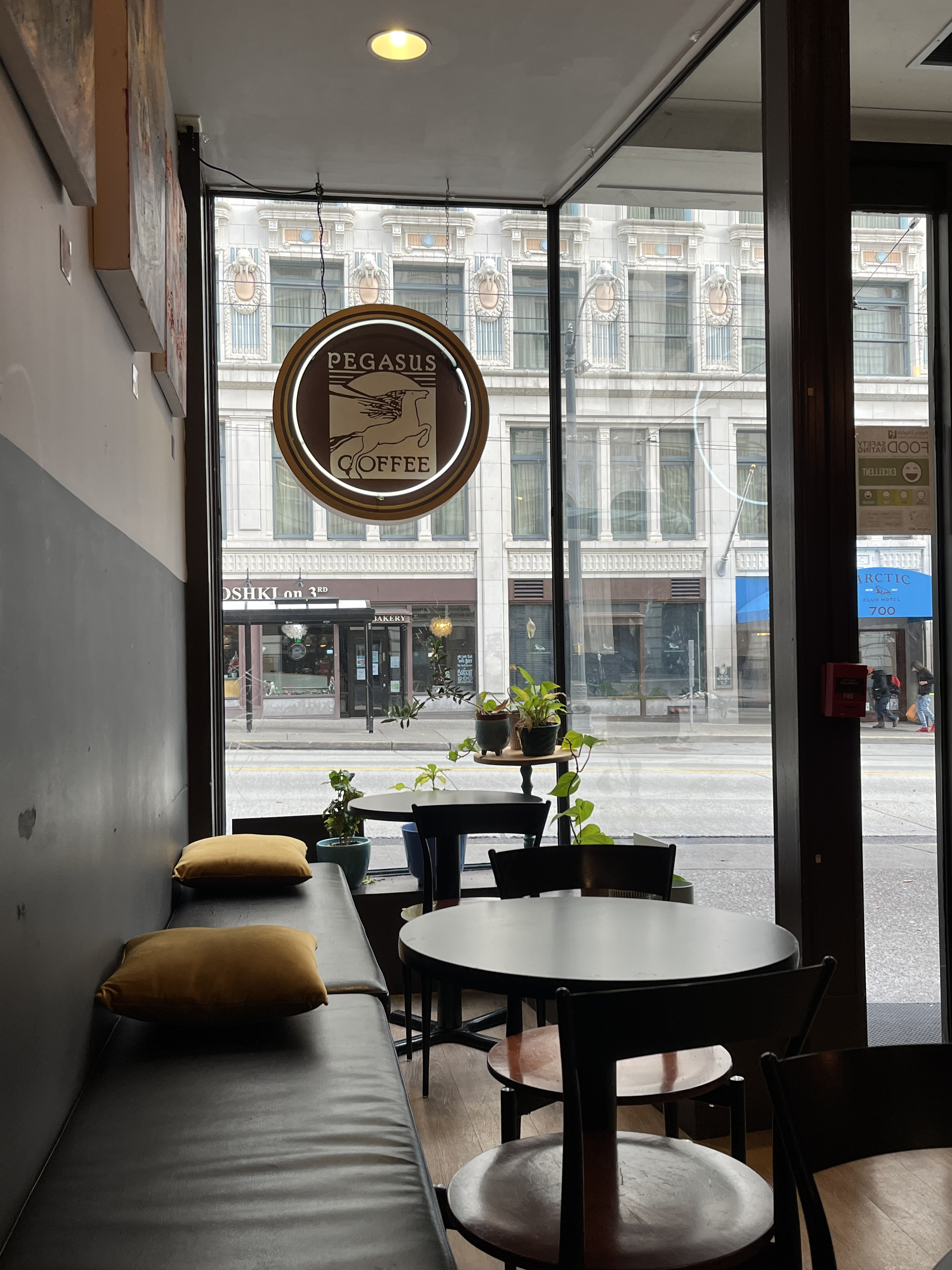
- Interior of the coffee shop in downtown Seattle's Dexter Horton Building, 2022

Pegasus Coffee Company (also known as Pegasus Coffee House) is a coffee company operating in Bainbridge Island and Seattle, in the U.S. state of Washington. The business has operated Pegasus Coffee Bar on 3rd Avenue, in the lobby of the Dexter Horton Building, in downtown Seattle.

== History ==
Jeff Waite was an owner. Matt Grady purchased the company in 2019. The company acquired Dudes Donuts in 2022.

== Reception ==
Financial Times included the Bainbridge Island location in a 2022 list of readers' picks for the best independent coffee shops in the world.

== See also ==
- List of coffeehouse chains
- List of restaurant chains in the United States
