= UW Tower =

Office Skyscraper

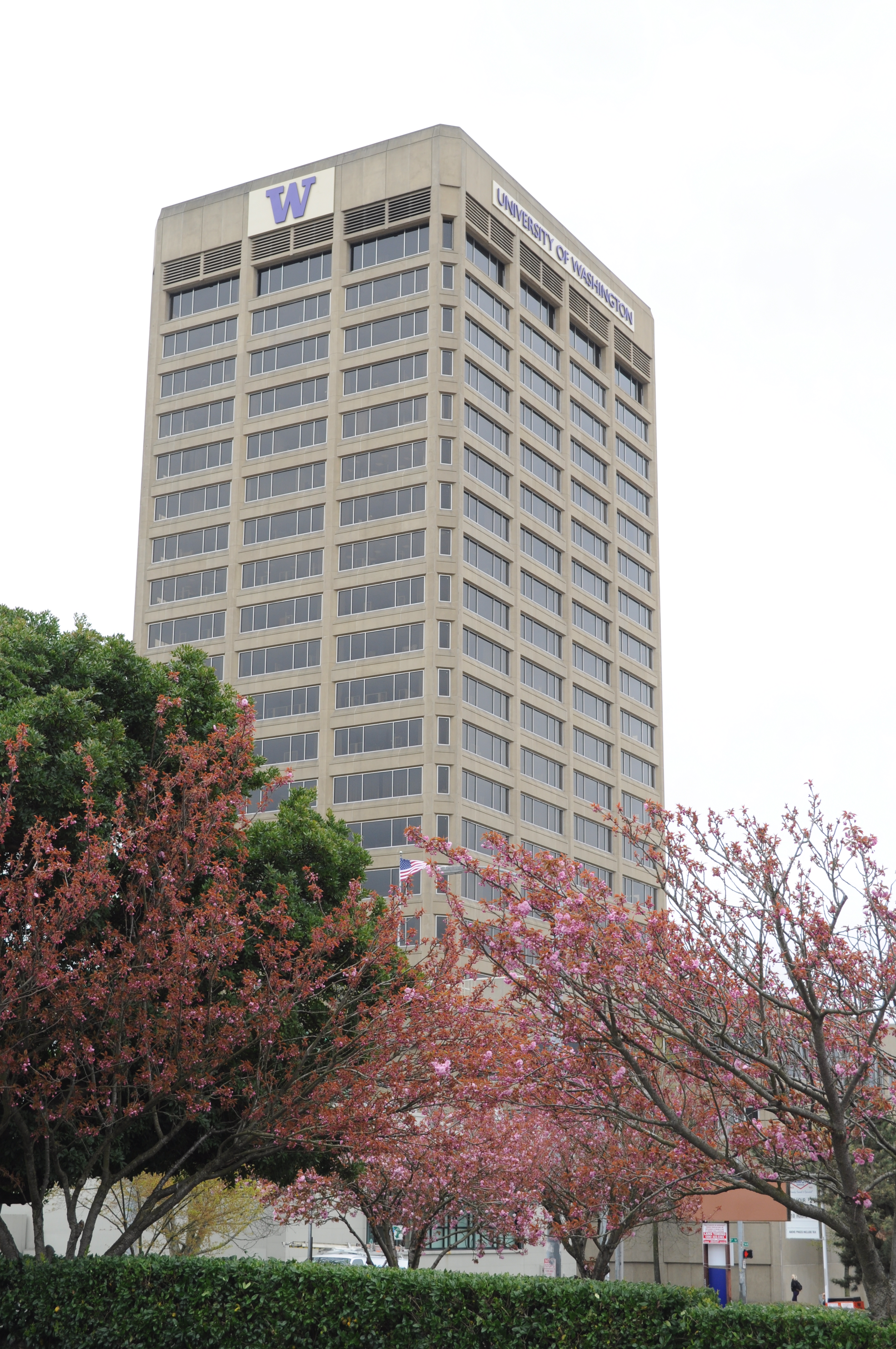
- UW Tower pictured in 2010
- Interactive map of the UW Tower area
- Alternative names: Safeco Plaza; Safeco Building

General information
- Type: Commercial offices
- Location: 4333 Brooklyn Avenue NE; Seattle, Washington, U.S.
- Coordinates: 47.660755°N 122.314673°W
- Completed: 1975
- Owner: University of Washington

Height
- Roof: 99 m (325 ft)

Technical details
- Floor count: 22

Design and construction
- Architect: Robert Sowder
- Architecture firm: NBBJ

The UW Tower is a high-rise office building complex located in the University District of Seattle, Washington, United States. It was completed in 1975 and serves as the head offices of the University of Washington. The 22-story tower was designed by NBBJ. It reaches a height of 99 m (325 ft), making it Seattle's tallest building outside the Downtown area.

The tower was originally constructed as Safeco Plaza to serve as Safeco Insurance's headquarters. It was generally referred to as the Safeco Building. Safeco sold the property to the University of Washington in 2006 for $130 million, and moved out one year later.

The purchase from Safeco included Safeco Tower, three adjacent buildings, a residential building with 29 units, two parking garages and two surface parking lots. Presently the university properties consist of the UW Tower itself, Buildings A, C, O, and S, the Collegiana building, two garages, and two surface lots.

== Architecture ==
The tower and surrounding complex were designed by Robert Sowder of Naramore, Bain, Brady and Johanson, a Seattle-based architecture firm. Its exterior uses a mix of precast concrete and terracotta elements in "earth tones" to match other buildings in the area. The tower sits on a series of octagonal columns that rise from the street-level plaza, which sits under part of the structure.

== Tenants ==
Although much of the building is used for administrative purposes, various schools and departments at the University of Washington, especially the medical sciences, have offices in the UW Tower. These include UW Information Technology (UW-IT), the UW Payroll Office, University Advancement and Professional and Continuing Education.

== Gallery ==
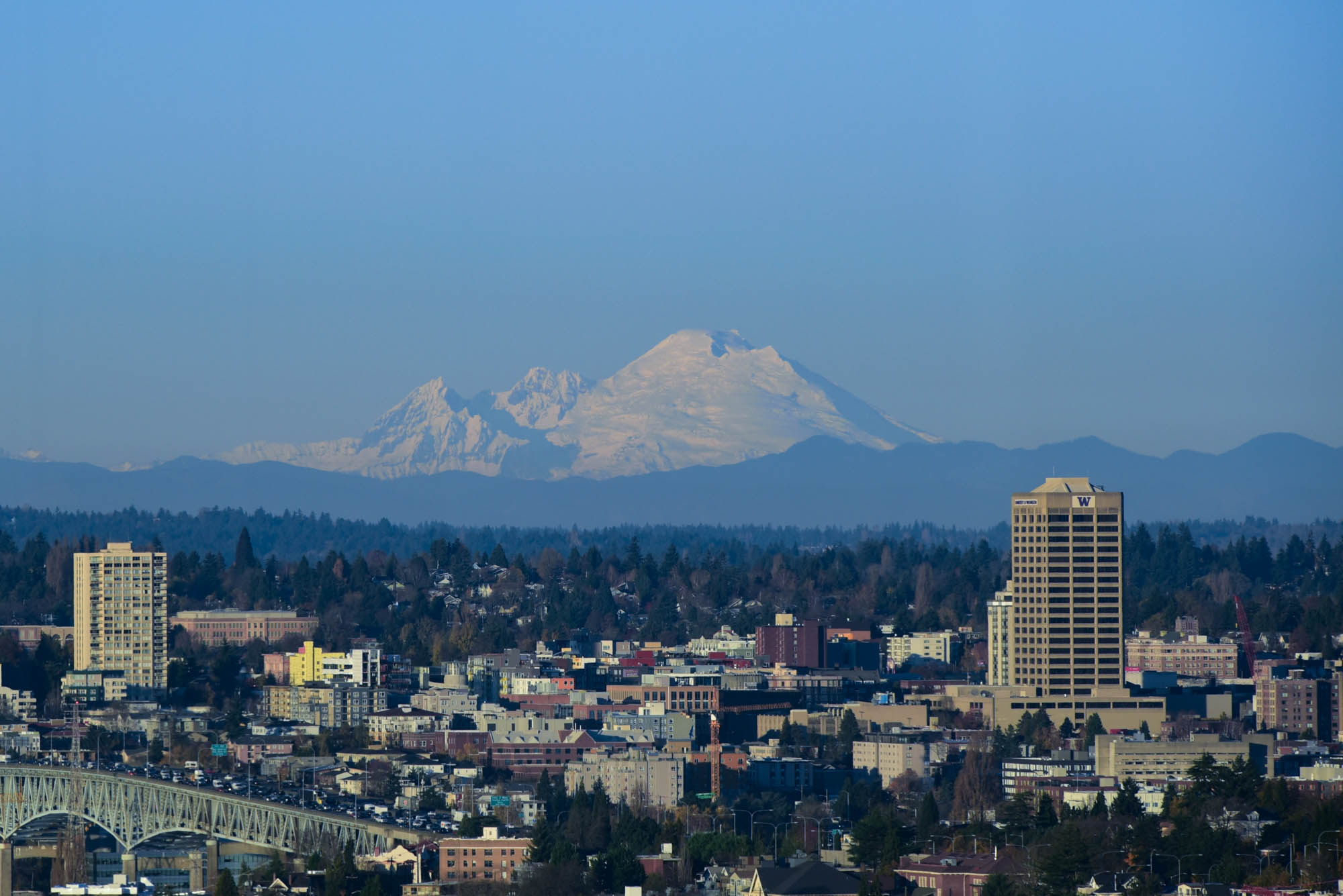
UW Tower with Mount Baker in the background

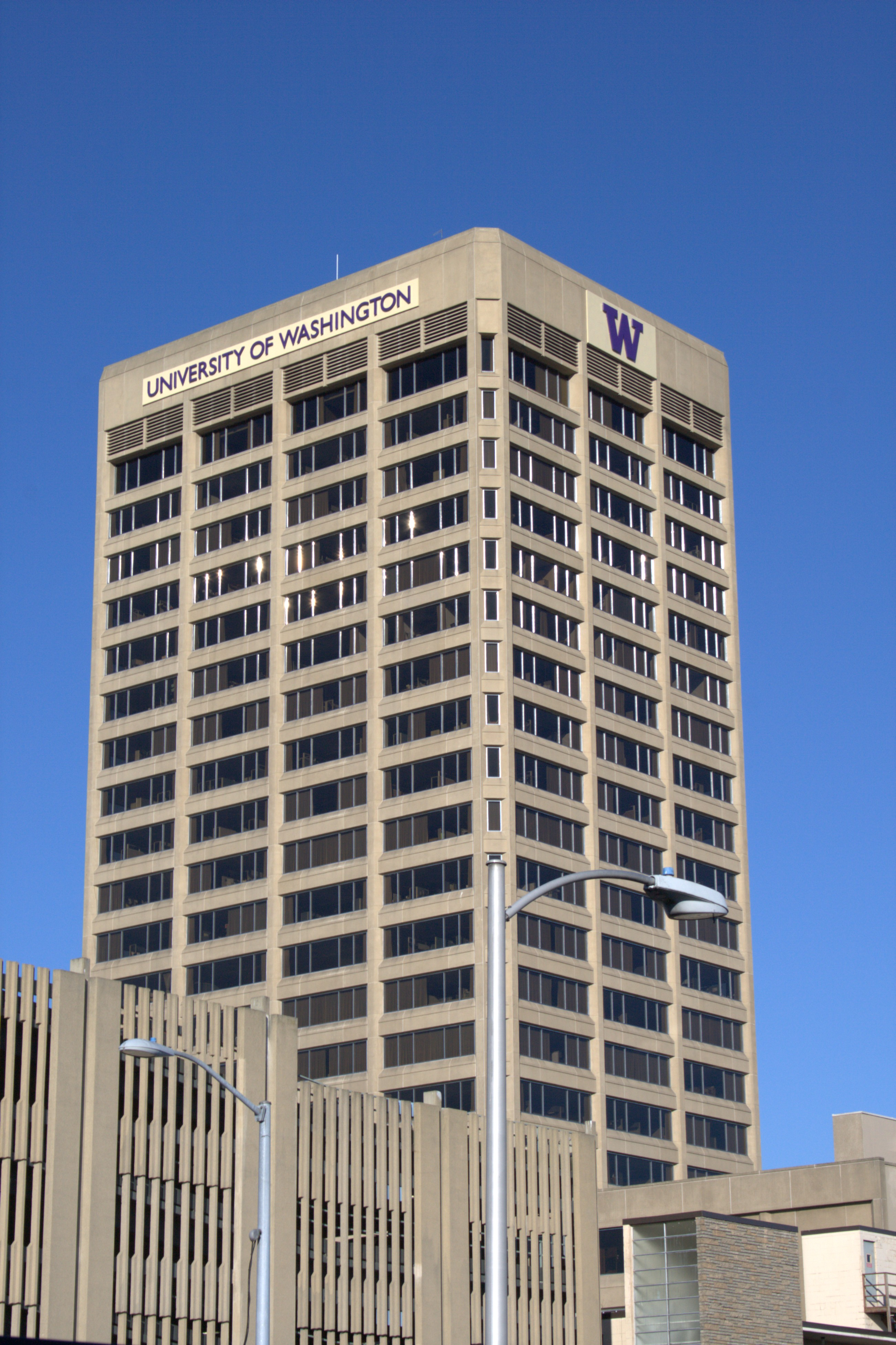
UW Tower in 2009

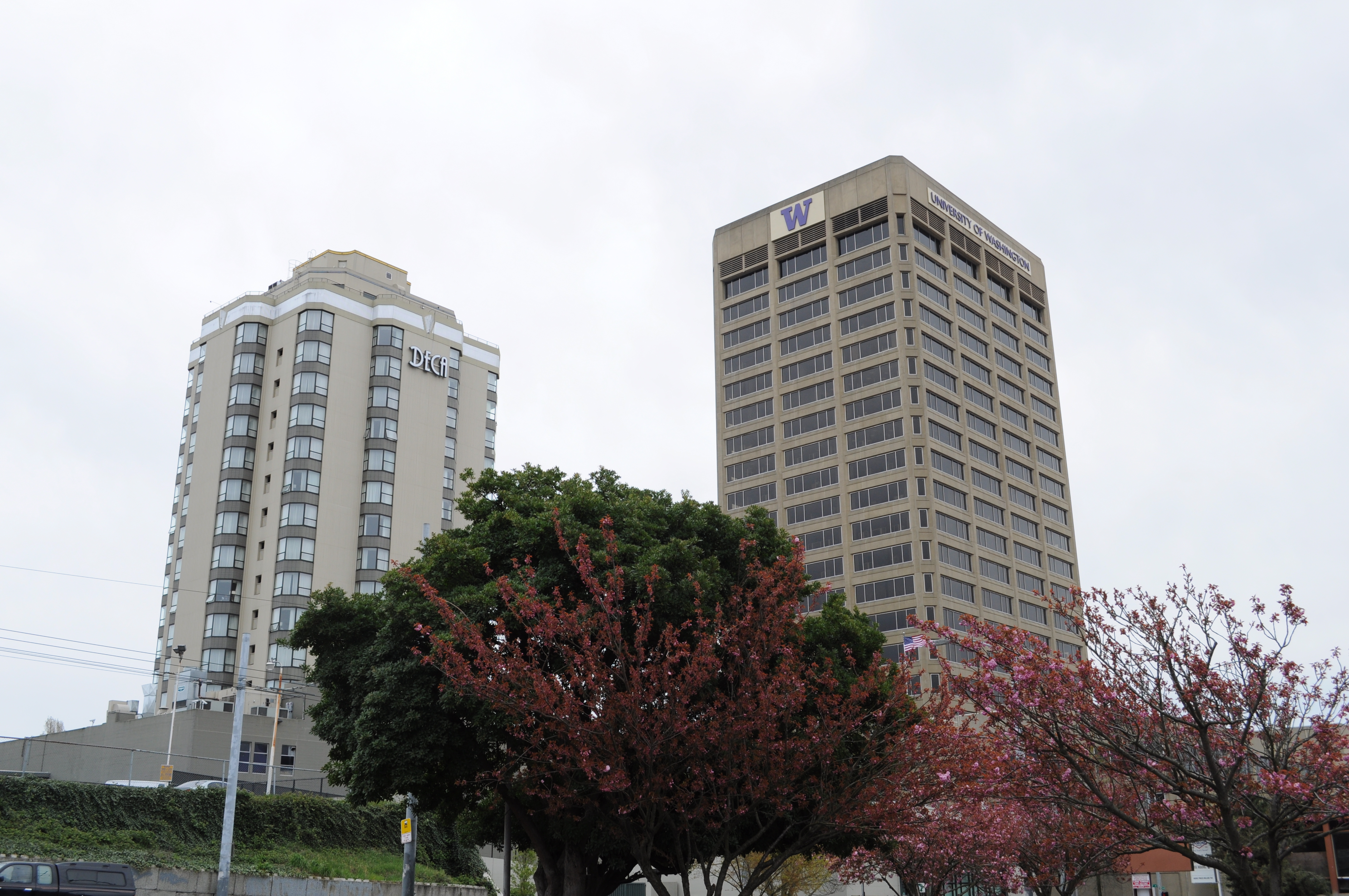
Hotel Deca (left) and UW Tower (right)

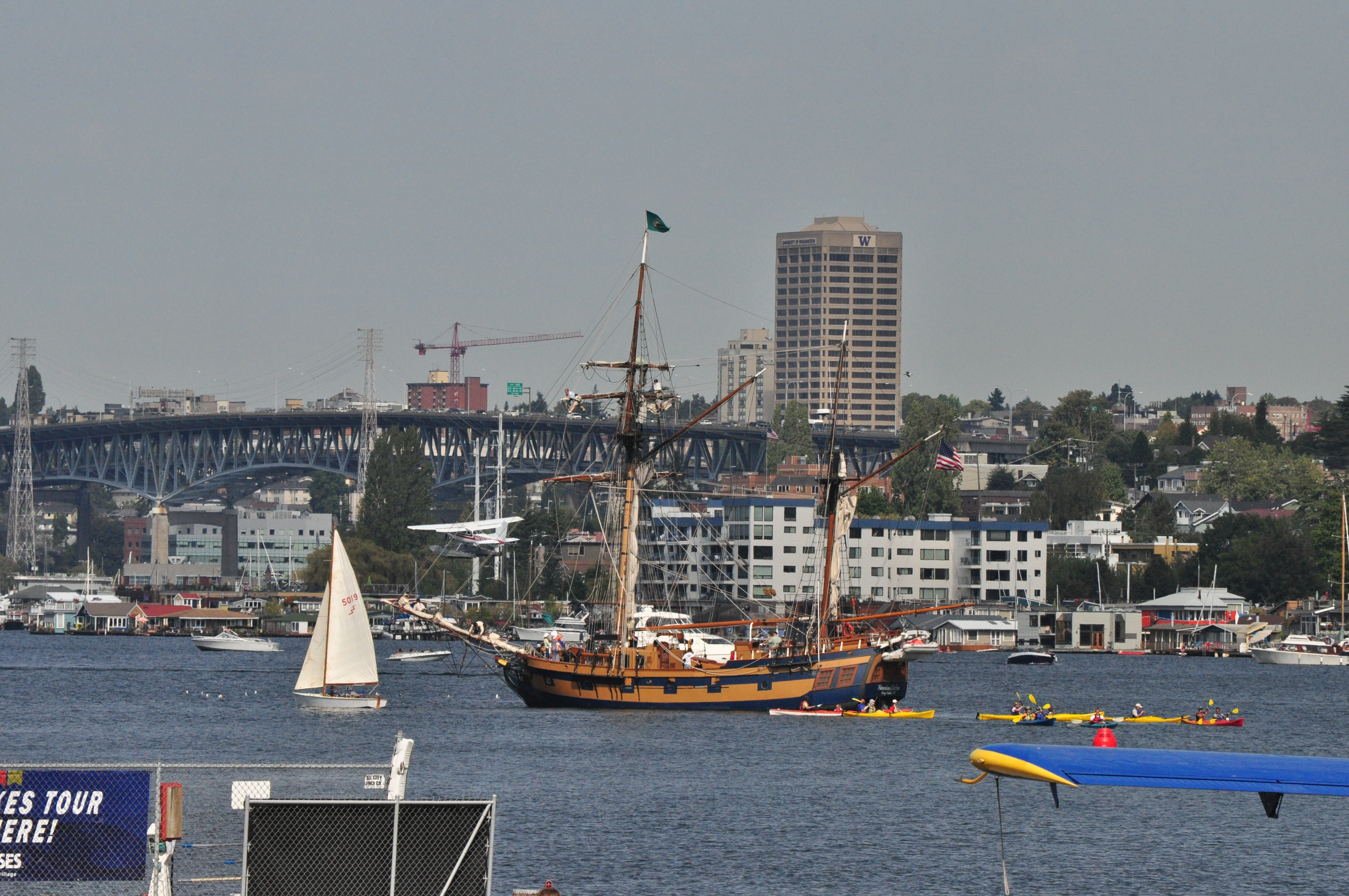
UW Tower pictured from Lake Union
