= Little Mouse on the Prairie =

- Genre: Comedy; Adventure
- Created by: Betty Birney; Stephen Cosgrove (original books)
- Developed by: Betty Birney
- Directed by: Arne Wong
- Opening theme: "Little Mouse on Prairie"
- Composers: Shuki Levy; Cashier Machi
- Countries of origin: United States; China
- Original languages: English; Mandarin
- No. of seasons: 1
- No. of episodes: 26 (each containing 2)

Production
- Executive producers: Eric S. Rollman; Joel Andryc; Shea PaiChuan; Qu JianZhong; Doug Stone
- Producers: Eric S. Rollman; Kurt Weldon; QuJian Fang
- Running time: 20 min (part 8-11 min)
- Production companies: Saban Entertainment; Afanti International Animation Corp.

Original release
- Network: CCTV
- Release: 1996

Little Mouse on the Prairie (Chinese: 大草原上的小老鼠; pinyin: Dàcǎoyuán Shàng De Xiǎo Lǎoshǔ) is a 26-episode animated series made by the cooperation of the US and China, loosely based on the Serendipity book by Stephen Cosgrove with the same title. The story features a city mouse named Osgood Dee who just moved to the countryside Squeaky Corners to live at his uncle's farm. Each show focuses on Osgood Dee and a group of animal friends he met at the farm. This is the second adaptation of a Serendipity book as the first adaptation was the 1983 anime series Serendipity the Pink Dragon.

Ownership of the series passed to Disney in 2001 when Disney acquired Fox Kids Worldwide, which also includes Saban Entertainment.

== Characters ==
=== Kids ===
- Osgood Dee (Chinese: 奥斯谷) - main character of the series and the leader of his friends.
- Tweezle Dee (Chinese: 特薇佐) - Osgood's cousin.
- Blossom (Chinese: 布劳森) - a rabbit who is in love with Osgood.
- Jeremiah (Chinese: 杰瑞迈) - a frog.
- Flaps (Chinese: 弗莱普) - a duck.
- Sweeny (Chinese: 斯威尼) - a weasel.

=== Cats ===
- B.C. - a fat cat.
- Cal - B.C.'s roommate, a thin cat.

=== Other ===
- R.D. - Osgood's uncle and Tweezle's father.
- Molly Dee - Osgood's aunt and Tweezle's mother.
- Betty Dee - Tweezle's baby sister.
- Grandpa Whiskers - an old wise mouse.
- Mutzy - a friendly dog who often interacts with the main characters.

== Episodes ==
No.	Title	Written by	Original release date
1	"The Whole Toot / Treasure Hunt"	TBD	1996
2	"All's Fair / Down the Creek"	TBD	1996
3	"A Pair of Spectacles / Popularity Contest"	TBD	1996
4	"Get a Job / Shut My Mouth"	TBD	1996
5	"Follow That Leader / Little Green Riding Hood"	TBD	1996
6	"Quack Up / Spring Cleaning"	TBD	1996
7	"Blossom Cries Wolf / Osgood the Snowman"	TBD	1996
8	"The More the Merrier / Fiddlin' Around"	TBD	1996
9	"Rain, Rain Go Away / Growing Like Crazy"	TBD	1996
10	"Fangs a Lot / Handyman Cal"	TBD	1996
11	"Going Bats / Osgood & the Beanstalk"	TBD	1996
12	"Junkyard Genius / Fright Night"	TBD	1996
13	"Nuts to You / The Best Gift of All"	TBD	1996
14	"Surprised Party / To Catch a Thief"	TBD	1996
15	"A Camping We Will Go / Lady For a Day"	TBD	1996
16	"A Clothes Call / Forget Me Not"	TBD	1996
17	"The Creature of Crawdaddy Creek / Pa's Little Helpers"	Betty G. Birney	1996
Osgood and his friends do some farm chores for a tired R.D. while having fun. When R.D. inspects their handiwork, he finds they have made messes in the process.
18	"A Fishy Story / Scaredy Cats"	TBD	1996
Scaredy Cats: Overhearing a ghost story, B.C. and Cal scare away the Prairie residents for easy pickings, so Osgood and his friends decide to get even.
19	"Up, Up and Away / Peas and Thank You"	TBD	1996
20	"Bitty's Big Adventure / Dear Patches"	TBD	1996
21	"Radish Rivals / No Bones About It"	TBD	1996
Given by R.D. the responsibility of their own radish patches, Osgood competes with his scientific methods against Tweezle's common sense methods.
22	"Barnyard Circus / B.C. and the Magic Lamp"	TBD	1996
23	"Stage Struck / Lemonade Wars"	TBD	1996
24	"Call of the Wild / Squeaky Corners Cook-Off"	TBD	1996
25	"Batter Up / Rock Star"	TBD	1996
26	"Thanks For Giving / Home Again"	TBD	1996

== DVD releases ==
In 2004, two DVDs each containing three episodes were released in German. The release of the rest of the series is unknown.

In 2011, the series was released on DVD (ISBN 9787888683518, Region ALL, NTSC format) in China. A set of 5-disc features all episodes in Mandarin Chinese dialogue or English language and with optional Chinese subtitles.

== See also ==
- Serendipity the Pink Dragon - first adaptation of the Serendipity book series.
