= Space Needle =

Observation tower in Seattle, Washington, U.S.

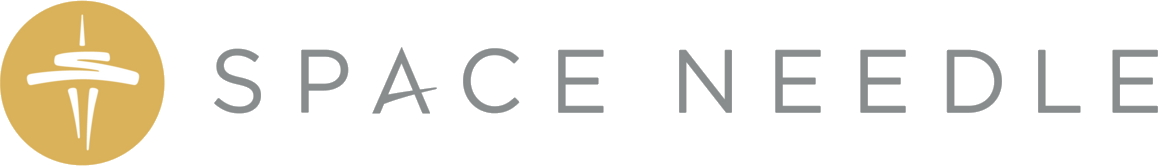

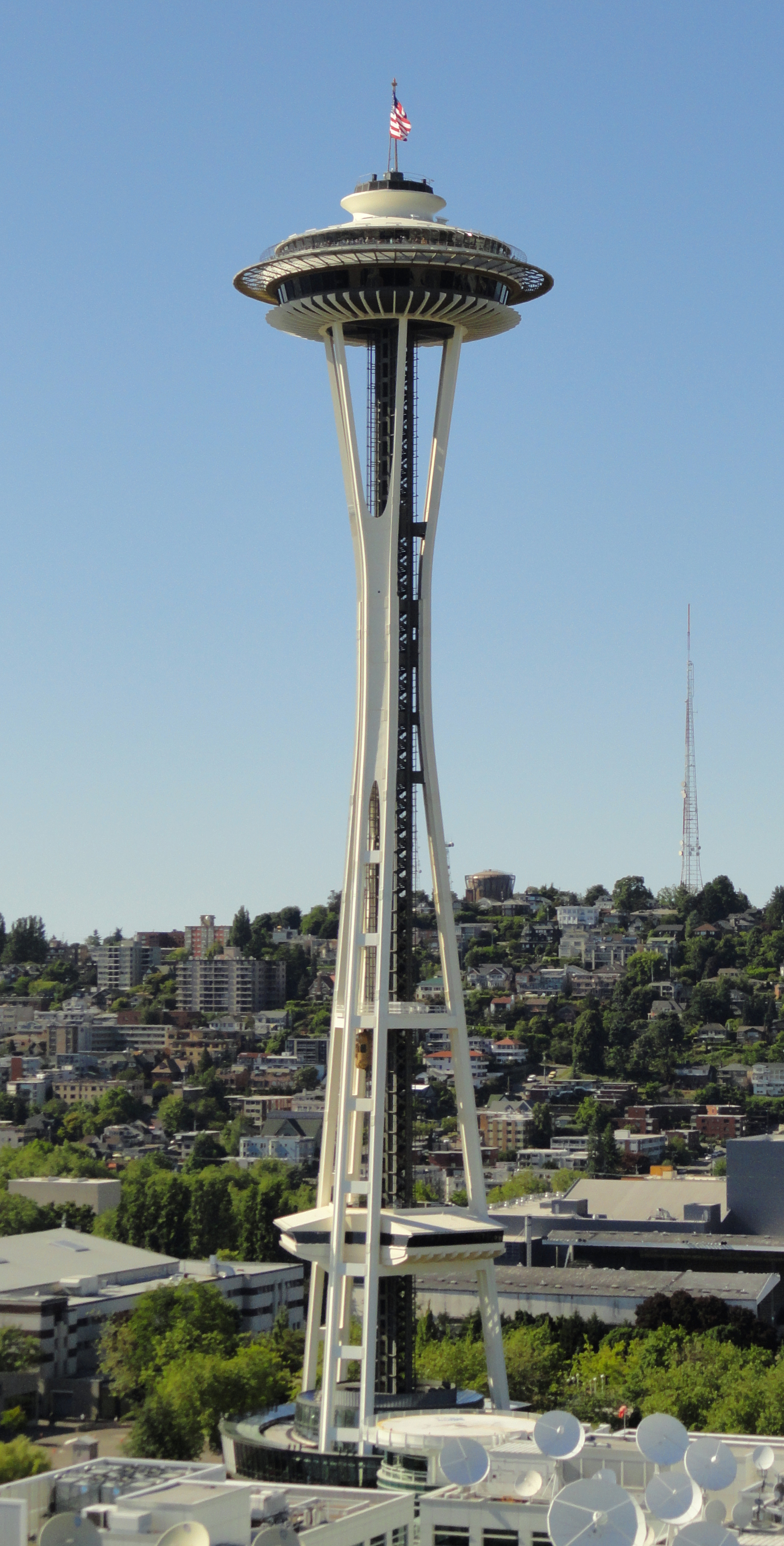
- The Seattle Space Needle in 2011

Record height
- Tallest in Seattle and Washington state from 1962 to 1969^{[I]}
- Preceded by: Smith Tower
- Surpassed by: Safeco Plaza

General information
- Status: Completed
- Type: Observation tower / Gyro tower
- Location: 400 Broad St; Seattle, Washington, U.S.
- Coordinates: 47.6204°N 122.3491°W
- Construction started: April 17, 1961
- Completed: December 8, 1961
- Opening: April 21, 1962
- Owner: Space Needle Corporation

Height
- Antenna spire: 605.00 ft (184.404 m)
- Top floor: 518 ft (158 m)

Technical details
- Floor count: 6
- Lifts/elevators: 3

Design and construction
- Architecture firm: John Graham & Company
- Structural engineer: John K. Minasian; Victor Steinbrueck
- Main contractor: Howard S. Wright Construction Co.

Website
- www.spaceneedle.com

Seattle Landmark
- Designated: April 19, 1999

The Space Needle is an observation tower in Seattle, Washington, United States. Considered to be an icon of the city, it has been designated a Seattle landmark. Located at 400 Broad Street in the Lower Queen Anne neighborhood, it was built in the Seattle Center for the 1962 World's Fair, which drew more than 2.3 million visitors.

At 605 ft (184 m) high, the Space Needle was once the tallest building west of the Mississippi River in the United States. The tower is 138 ft (42 m) wide, weighs 9,550 short tons (8,660 metric tons), and is built to withstand winds of up to 200 mph (320 km/h) and earthquakes of up to 9.0 magnitude, as strong as the 1700 Cascadia earthquake.

Elevators take visitors to an observation deck 520 ft (160 m) above ground in 41 seconds, which offers panoramic views of the downtown Seattle skyline, the Olympic and Cascade Mountains, Mount Rainier, Mount Baker, Elliott Bay, and various islands in Puget Sound. On April 19, 1999, the city's Landmarks Preservation Board designated the tower a historic landmark.

== Architecture ==
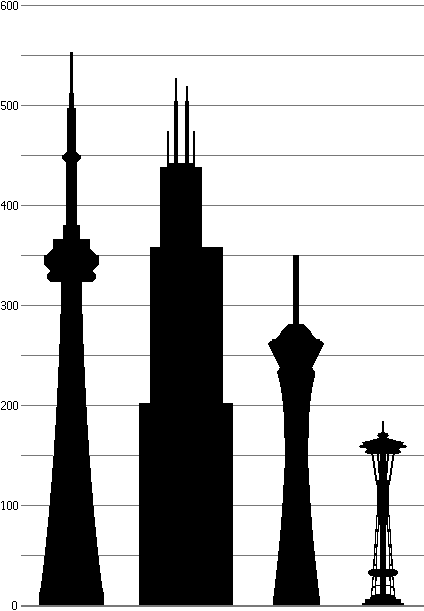
Left to right: CN Tower (Toronto), Willis Tower (Chicago), Stratosphere (Las Vegas), and the Space Needle

The architecture of the Space Needle is the result of a compromise between the designs of two people, Edward E. Carlson and John Graham, Jr. The two leading ideas for the World Fair involved businessman Edward E. Carlson's sketch (on a napkin) of a giant balloon tethered to the ground (the gently sloping base) and architect John Graham's concept of a flying saucer (that houses the restaurant and observation deck). Victor Steinbrueck introduced the hourglass profile of the tower and its tripod design, which resembles the isthmus that Seattle is situated on. The Space Needle was built to withstand Category 5-plus wind speeds of 200 mph (320 km/h), double the requirements in the building code of 1962, swaying only 1 inch (25 mm) per 10 miles per hour (16 km/h) of wind speed.

While the 2001 6.8 M_{w} Nisqually earthquake jolted the Needle enough to cause water to slosh out of the toilets, the structure is designed to avoid serious structural damage in earthquakes of magnitudes below 9.1.

For decades, the hovering disk of the Space Needle was home to two restaurants 500 ft (150 m) above the ground: the Space Needle Restaurant, which was originally named Eye of the Needle, and Emerald Suite. These were closed in 2000 to make way for SkyCity, a larger restaurant featuring Pacific Northwest cuisine, which closed in 2017. In 1993, the elevators were replaced with new computerized versions. The new elevators descend at a rate of 10 mph (16 km/h).

On December 31, 1999, a powerful beam of light was unveiled for the first time. Known as the Legacy Light or Skybeam, it is powered by lamps that total 85 million candela shining skyward from the top of the Space Needle to honor national holidays and special occasions in Seattle. The concept of this beam was derived from the official 1962 World's Fair poster, which depicted such a light source (although none was incorporated into the building's original design). It is somewhat controversial because of the light pollution it creates. Originally planned to be turned on 75 nights per year, it has generally been used fewer than a dozen times per year. It did remain lit for eleven days in a row from September 11, 2001, to September 22, 2001, in response to the September 11, 2001, attacks.

A 1962 Seattle World's Fair poster showed a grand spiral entryway leading to the elevator that was ultimately omitted from final building plans. The main stairwell has 848 steps from the basement to the top of the observation deck. At approximately 605 ft (184 m), the Space Needle was the tallest building west of the Mississippi River at the time it was built by Howard S. Wright Construction Co., but is now dwarfed by other structures along the Seattle skyline alone, among them the Columbia Center, at 967 ft (295 m). Unlike many other similar structures, such as the CN Tower in Toronto, the Space Needle is not used for broadcasting purposes.

== History ==
=== Construction ===
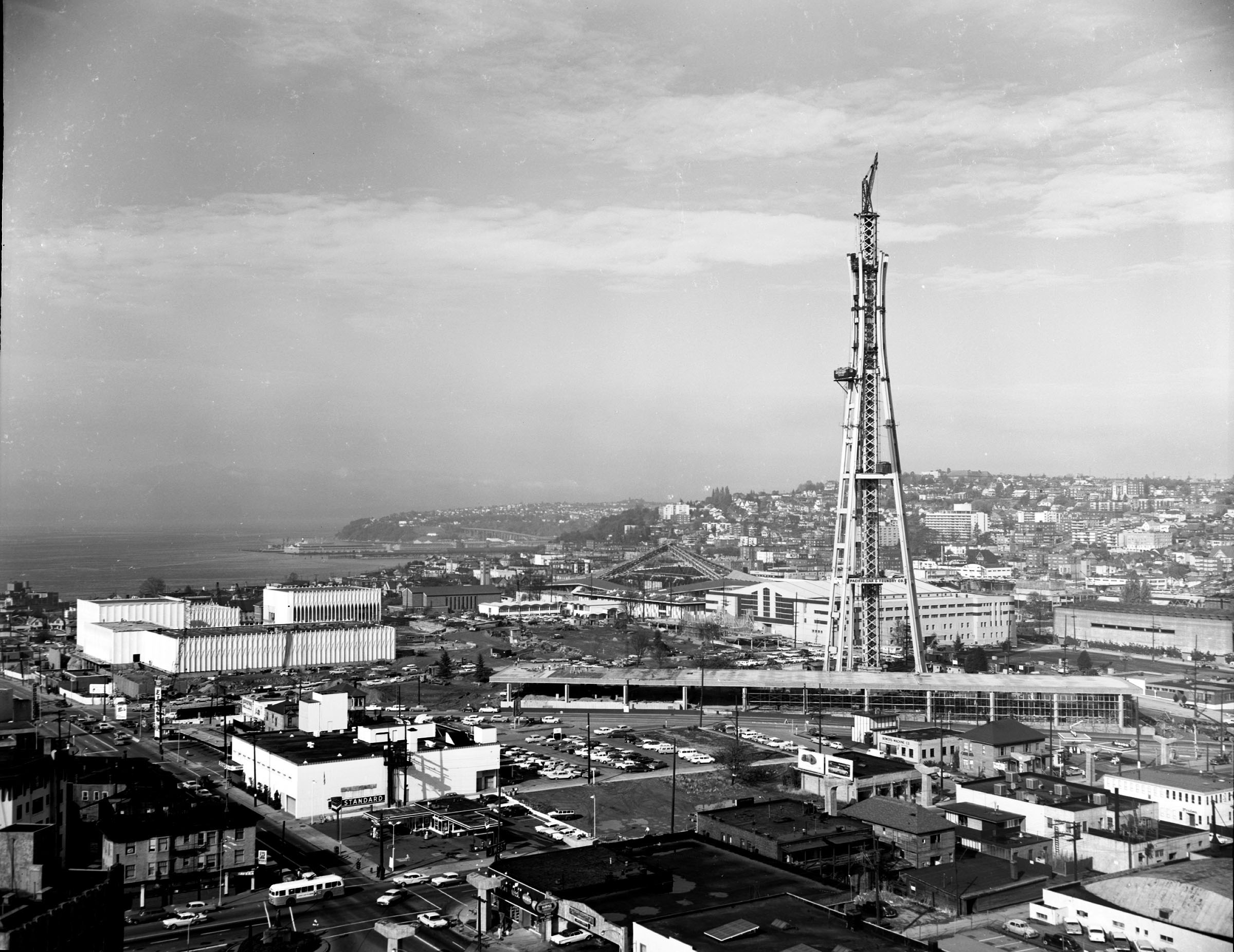
Space Needle and various buildings for the Seattle World's Fair under construction, 1961

Edward E. Carlson, chairman of the 1962 Worlds Fair in Seattle, had an idea for erecting a tower with a restaurant at the World's Fair. The president of Western International Hotels, he had been inspired by a recent visit to the Stuttgart Tower in Germany. Local architect John Graham soon became involved as a result of his success in designing Northgate Mall. Graham's first move was to alter the restaurant's original design to a revolving restaurant, similar to his previous design of the La Ronde tower restaurant at the Ala Moana Center in Honolulu. Among the names proposed for the structure by Carlson, Graham, and Steinbrueck were the "Space Needle", "Star Tickler", "Top Hat", and "Big Skookum".

The proposed Space Needle had no pre-selected site. Since it was not financed by the city, land had to be purchased within the fairgrounds. The investors had been unable to find suitable land and the search for a site was nearly dead when, in 1961, they discovered a lot, 120 by 120 ft (37 by 37 m), containing switching equipment for the fire and police alarm systems. The land, which originally had the neighborhood's fire station until 1921, was sold by the city for $75,000. Geotechnical engineers quickly tested and approved the site for construction. At this point, only one year remained before the World's Fair would begin. The Needle was privately financed and built by the Pentagram Corporation, consisting of Bagley Wright, contractor Howard S. Wright, architect John Graham, Ned Skinner, and Norton Clapp. In 1977, Bagley, Skinner, and Clapp sold their interest to the Howard Wright Company, which now controls it under the name of Space Needle Corporation.

The concrete base of the Space Needle is 30 ft (9.1 m) deep and 120 ft (37 m) across, and took 467 redi-mix trucks one full day to fill. The foundation weighs 5,850 short tons (5,310 metric tons) (including 250 short tons or 230 metric tons of reinforcing steel), the same as the above-ground structure. The tower is secured to the foundation with 72 30 ft (9.1 m) long bolts.

With time an issue, the construction team worked around the clock. The domed top, housing the top five levels (including the restaurants and observation deck), was perfectly balanced so that the restaurant could rotate with the help of one tiny electric motor, originally 0.8 kilowatts (1.1 hp), later replaced with a 1.1 kilowatts (1.5 hp) motor. Painted in Orbital Olive paint for the body, Astronaut White for the legs, Re-entry Red for the saucer, and Galaxy Gold for the roof, the Space Needle was finished in less than one year. It was completed in April 1962 at a cost of $4.5 million. The last elevator car was installed the day before the Fair opened on April 21. During the course of the Fair, nearly 20,000 people a day rode to the Observation Deck, culminating to a total of 2.56 million visitors. Upon completion, the Space Needle was the tallest building west of the Mississippi River, replacing the Kansas City Power and Light Building which had held that distinction since 1931. It also replaced the Smith Tower in downtown Seattle as the tallest building on the American west coast, which it had been since 1914.

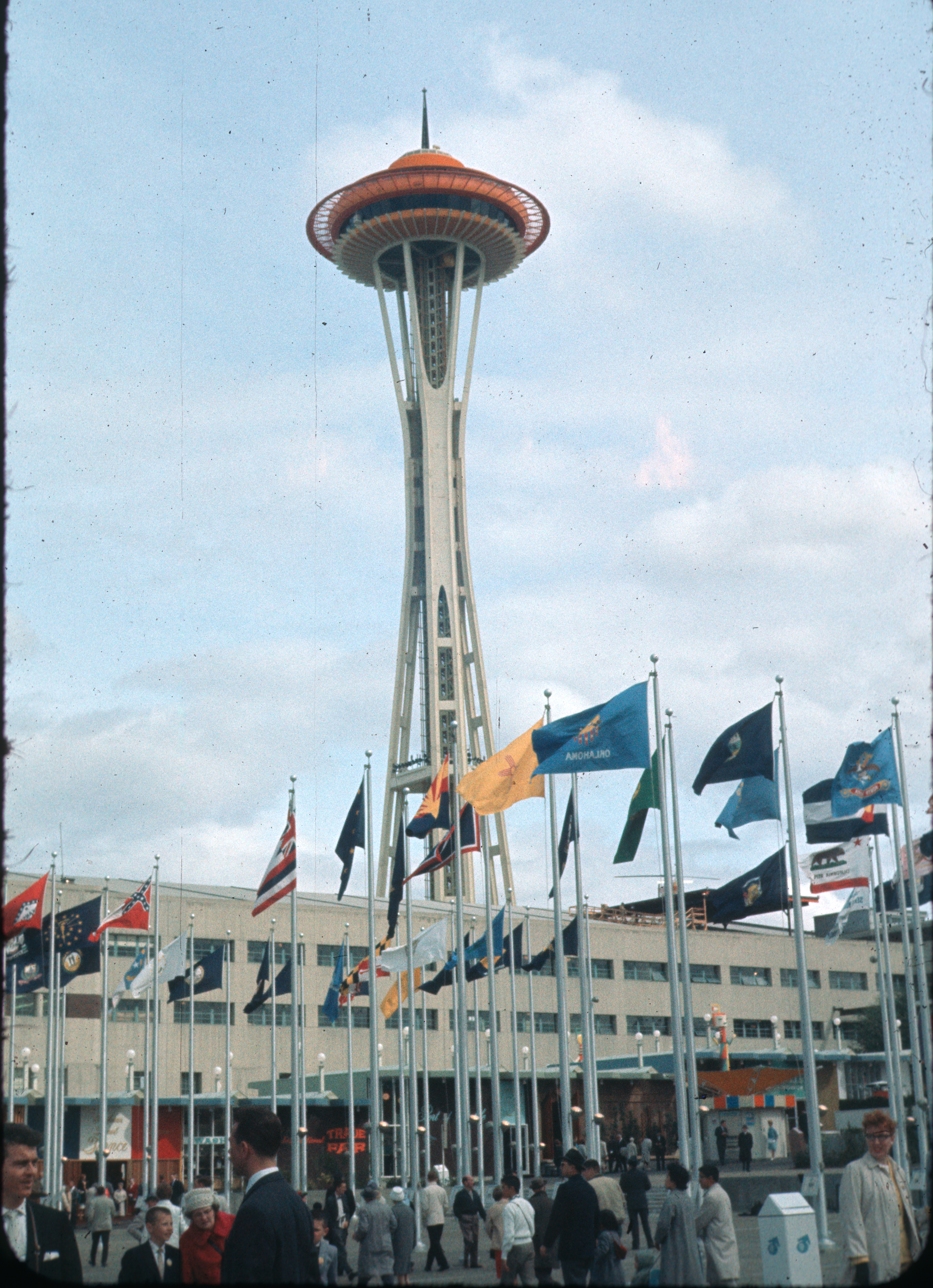
Completed Space Needle after the opening of the World's Fair - April 1962

The revolving restaurant was operated by Carlson's Western International Hotels under a 20-year contract from April 1, 1962, to April 1, 1982.

=== Carillon ===
An imitation carillon (using recordings of bells, rather than live bells) was installed in the Space Needle, and played several times a day during the World's Fair. The instrument, built by the Schulmerich Bells Company of Hatfield, Pennsylvania under the name "Carillon Americana", recreated the sounds of 538 bells and was the largest in the world, until eclipsed by a 732 bell instrument at the 1964 New York World's Fair. The operator's console was located in the base of the Space Needle, completely enclosed in glass to allow observation of the musician playing the instrument. It was also capable of being played from a roll, like a player piano. The forty-four stentors (speakers) of the carillon were located underneath the Needle's disc at the 200-foot (61 m) level and were audible over the entire fairgrounds and up to ten miles (16 km) away. The carillon was disassembled after the fair's close.

The Carillon Americana was featured on a 12-track LP record called "Bells On High-Fi" (catalog number AR-8, produced by Americana Records, of Sellersville, Pennsylvania). These studio recordings were performed by noted carillonneur John Klein (1915–1981).

=== After the Fair ===
A radio broadcast studio was built on the observation level of the Space Needle in 1963. It was used for morning broadcasts by Radio KING and its sister TV station KING-TV from July 1963 to May 1966, and KIRO Radio from 1966 to 1974. Disc jockey Bobby Wooten of country music station KAYO-AM lived in an apartment built adjacent to the Space Needle's broadcast studio for six months in 1974, which required a permit variance from the city government.

On March 27, 1964, the restaurant atop the Space Needle stopped rotating as a result of the 9.2 earthquake in Alaska.

In 1974, author Stephen Cosgrove's children's book Wheedle on the Needle imagined a furry creature called the Wheedle who lived on top of the Space Needle and caused its light to flash. Its closing quatrain is: There's a Wheedle on the Needle / I know just what you're thinking / But if you look up late at night / You'll see his red nose blinking. The Wheedle has since become a fixture of Seattle. It became the mascot of the Seattle SuperSonics National Basketball Association (NBA) franchise, which played in nearby KeyArena (now Climate Pledge Arena). The SuperSonics moved to Oklahoma City on July 3, 2008.

In 1982, the SkyLine level was added at the height of 100 ft (30 m). Although it was part of the original plans for the Space Needle, it was not built until that time. Today, the SkyLine Banquet Facility can accommodate groups of 20–360 people.

On April 19, 1999, the Space Needle was designated as a city historic landmark by the Seattle Landmarks Preservation Board 37 years after it opened. It was the youngest historic landmark in the city. Renovations were completed in 2000 at a cost ($21 million) approximately the same in inflated dollars as the original construction price. Renovations between 1999 and 2000 included the SkyCity restaurant, SpaceBase retail store, Skybeam installation, Observation Deck overhaul, lighting additions, and repainting.

On New Year's Eve, the Space Needle hosts a fireworks show at midnight; Alberto Navarro, a fireworks artist from Bellevue, is the lead architect of the show, which is viewed by thousands from the Seattle Center grounds, and televised by KING-TV. In 2000, public celebrations were canceled because of perceived terror threats against the structure after investigations into the foiled millennium bombing plots, but the fireworks show was still held. The 2020 fireworks display was canceled and replaced by a light show due to high winds, while the 2021 display was canceled and replaced by a broadcast-only augmented reality show due to the COVID-19 pandemic. The fireworks display returned for 2022, but the Seattle Center grounds were closed to the public due to state proof of vaccination rules, and the television broadcast included augmented reality effects.

In 2002, a real estate consultant in Bellevue proposed the construction of five smaller replicas of the Space Needle around the city to promote tourism, though official plans to build the proposed structures have not yet materialized.

On May 19, 2007, the Space Needle welcomed its 45 millionth visitor, Greg Novoa from California, who received a free trip for two to Paris.

In May 2008, the Space Needle received its first professional deep cleaning since the opening of the 1962 World's Fair. The monument was pressure washed by Kärcher with water at a pressure of almost 2,611 psi (18,000 kPa) and a temperature of approximately 194 °F (90 °C). The cleaning was done only at night so that the Space Needle could stay open to the public. No detergents were used in consideration of the Seattle Center and the nearby Experience Music Project.

=== 50th anniversary and renovation ===
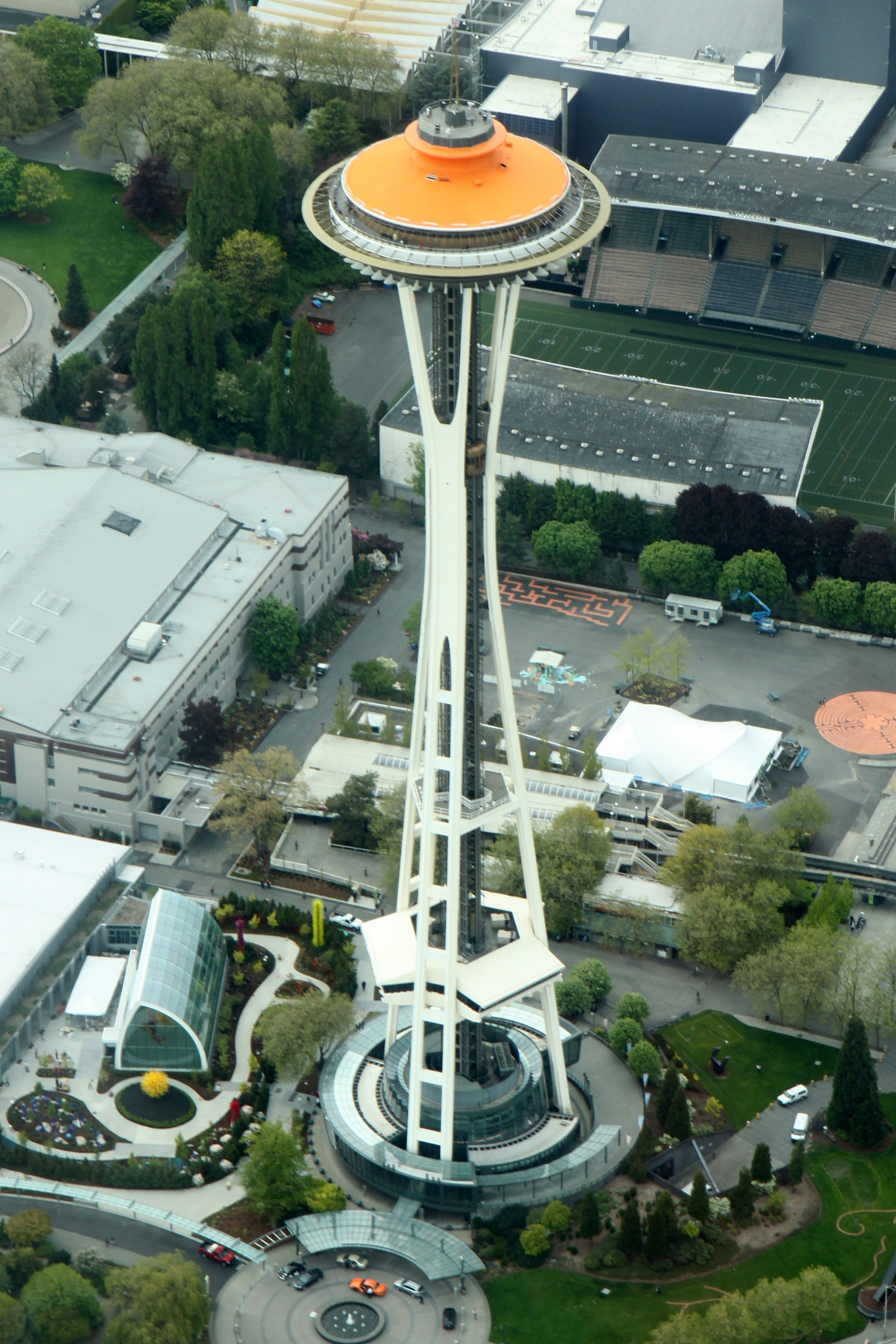
Space Needle painted in "Galaxy Gold" for its 50th anniversary.

As part of the celebration of its 50th anniversary in April 2012, the roof of the Needle was painted "Galaxy Gold", which is more of an orangish color in practice. This is the same color used when the needle was originally constructed for the 1962 World's Fair. This temporary makeover, intended to last through the summer, is not the Needle's first: it had the University of Washington (UW) Huskies football team logo painted after the team won the 1992 Rose Bowl; when the game show Wheel of Fortune taped episodes in Seattle in 1995, it was painted to resemble the titular wheel as part of an intro sequence with Vanna White; it was painted crimson after Washington State won the Apple Cup; was painted red, white, and blue for Memorial Day in 2003; and has been seen with the Seattle SuperSonics and Seattle Mariners colors and logos. The Galaxy Gold paint scheme returned for the Space Needle's 60th anniversary in May 2022 and was replaced a year later at a cost of $60,000 to $70,000.

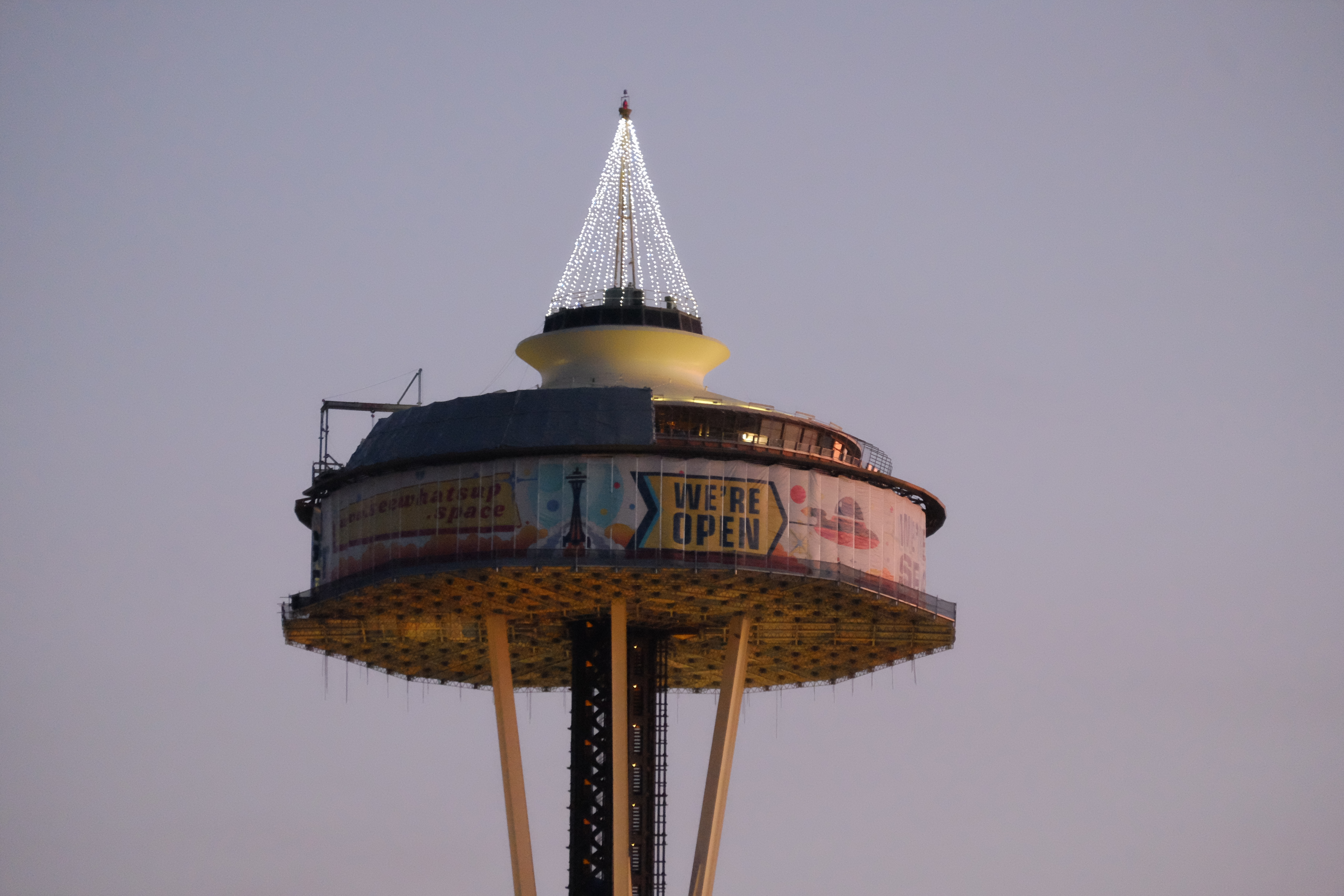
Scaffold surrounding top section during 2017–2018 renovation

A renovation of the top of the Space Needle began in the summer of 2017, to add an all-glass floor to the restaurant, replace the observation platform windows with floor-to-ceiling glass panels to more closely match the 1962 original concept sketches, as well as upgrade and update the internal systems. Called the Century Project, the work was scheduled to finish by June 2018, at a cost of $100 million in private funds provided by the Wright family, who own the Space Needle. The designer is Olson Kundig Architects and the general contractor is Hoffman Construction Company. The rotating restaurant's motor was replaced, the elevator capacity was increased by adding elevators or double-stacking them, and the energy efficiency of the building was improved with the aim of achieving LEED Gold Certification. The temporary scaffold's 28,000-pound (13,000 kg), 44,650-square-foot (4,148 m^{2}) platform under the top structure was assembled on the ground and then lifted by cables 500 ft (150 m) from the ground to the underside of the structure, controlled by 12 operators standing on the platform as it was raised. The platform was made by Safway Services, a company specializing in unique construction scaffolding. One-sixth of the observation deck was closed at a time so that the Space Needle was never completely shut down to the public.

The space reopened in August 2018 as the Loupe, an indoor observation deck with a revolving glass floor. It takes 45 minutes for the observation deck to do a full rotation. Two sets of stairs called the Oculus Stairs were added to connect the two new levels. They were named after the glass oculus at the base of the stairs where the Space Needle elevators can be seen ascending and descending. A café, wine bar, more restrooms, and an additional accessibility elevator to the top observation deck were also added. For the first several months of construction, a temporary enclosure was added above the roof.

Further renovations were made in 2025, including the addition of a revolving glass floor in the restaurant, new glass on the observation decks, and the first of three double-deck floor-to-ceiling glass elevators. The renovation aimed to open up larger, panoramic views from both the top of the structure and from the elevators. The remaining two elevators are scheduled to be replaced, one each in 2027 and 2028.

== Flag ==
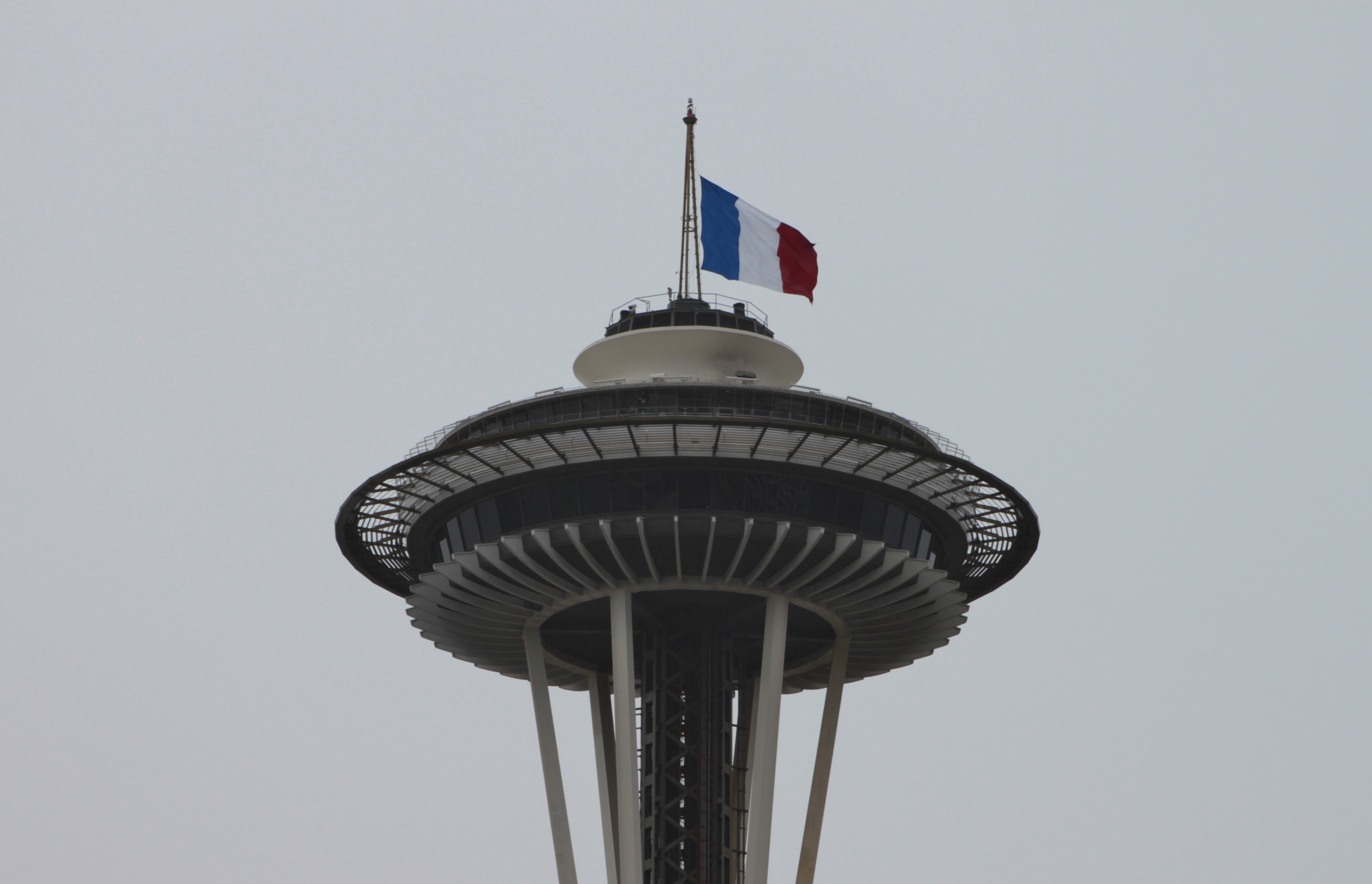
The flag of France, displayed atop the Space Needle in November 2015 after the Paris attacks

The top of the Space Needle is periodically decorated with a large flag to commemorate holidays, events, and other civic occasions. These flags measure 25 by 35 feet (7.6 by 10.7 m) and are produced by a Tukwila-based printing company. The flag of the United States is displayed on several annual dates, including Independence Day and lowered to half-staff for the deaths of prominent figures, such as U.S. presidents, or to commemorate major events. The flags of local sports teams are raised for championships and major events; during Super Bowl XLVIII, fireworks were launched from the Space Needle for each touchdown scored by the Seattle Seahawks.

The Pride flag and its variants have been displayed during annually in June to commemorate Pride Month; it was first raised at the Space Needle in 2010 and followed by another in 2011, but was not displayed in 2012 due to the ongoing referendum to legalize same-sex marriage in Washington. A special marriage equality flag was used in 2013 and replaced by normal Pride flags in the following years and later the Progress Pride flag from 2020 onward.

The flag of France was raised at half-staff in November 2015 to show solidarity with the victims of the Paris attacks. In July 2020, a "Mask Up" flag was raised by the King County government as a reminder of face mask rules during the COVID-19 pandemic. The flag of India was raised on August 16, 2025, to commemorate the country's 79th Independence Day.

== Jumping incidents ==
Six parachutists have leaped from the tower since its opening, in a sport known as BASE jumping. This activity is legal only with prior authorization. Four of them were part of an authorized promotion in 1996, and one of the jumpers broke a bone in her back while attempting the stunt. The other two jumped illegally and were arrested.

Paul D. Baker was the first person to jump from the Space Needle, committing suicide on March 4, 1974. Mary Lucille Wolf also jumped from the tower that year, on May 25. Following the two 1974 suicides, netting beneath and improved fencing around the observation deck were installed. In spite of the barrier additions, however, another suicide by Dixie Reeder occurred on July 5, 1978.

On July 24th, 2026, two unidentified men illegally parachuted off the top of the Space Needle. They were seen on camera going to a restroom, then emerging wearing helmets. The two men then ran and scaled a window on the observation deck, and jumped off. Shortly afterwards, police began searching for the two jumpers.

== Appearances in TV and film ==
As a symbol of the Pacific Northwest, the Space Needle has made numerous appearances in films, TV shows, and other works of fiction. The Space Needle is often used in establishing shots as an economical means of indicating the setting is Seattle. Examples include the TV shows Frasier, Grey's Anatomy, Dark Angel, Bill Nye the Science Guy, and films It Happened at the World's Fair (1962), The Parallax View (1974), where it was used as a filming location, Sleepless in Seattle (1993), and Chronicle (2012). The 1999 film Austin Powers: The Spy Who Shagged Me made an absurdist visual gag conflating another icon of Seattle, Starbucks, with the tower, showing the coffee chain's name written across the Space Needle's saucer placing the villain Doctor Evil's base of operations there after his henchman Number 2 shifted the organization's resources toward the coffee company. As a visual symbol of Seattle, the Space Needle has been incorporated into the logos of NBA (in various logos for the Seattle SuperSonics from 1967 to 2001), WNBA (for the Seattle Storm), MLS (for Seattle Sounders FC), and NHL (for the Seattle Kraken's alternate anchor logo) professional sports teams.

The Space Needle has been involved in practical jokes, especially those on April Fools' Day. In 1989, KING-TV's Almost Live! reported that the Space Needle had collapsed, causing panicked people to call emergency services and forcing the station to apologize afterwards; the incident was compared to the 1938 radio broadcast of The War of the Worlds, which caused panic among some listeners. On April 1, 2015, public radio station KPLU reported that a hoax sign had been erected by a group calling itself the "Borg Collective", depicting a fake proposed land use action "to construct a 666 unit cube to assimilate" the landmark.

Other TV appearances include The History Channel's Life After People, in which the tower collapses after 200 years because of corrosion. The tower was also destroyed in the TV miniseries 10.5 when a 7.9 earthquake hits Seattle. The miniseries mistakenly portrays the Needle as crumbling concrete, though the structure is actually made of steel and designed to withstand up to a 9.0 earthquake. The Space Needle was also the site of the first task for the finale of The Amazing Race 35, where contestants had to walk atop its roof.

The Space Needle features in the HBO series The Last of Us as a watchtower in a post-apocalyptic version of Seattle, a major setting of the second season. It played a similar role in the video game The Last of Us Part II, which serves as source material for the TV series.

== Gallery ==
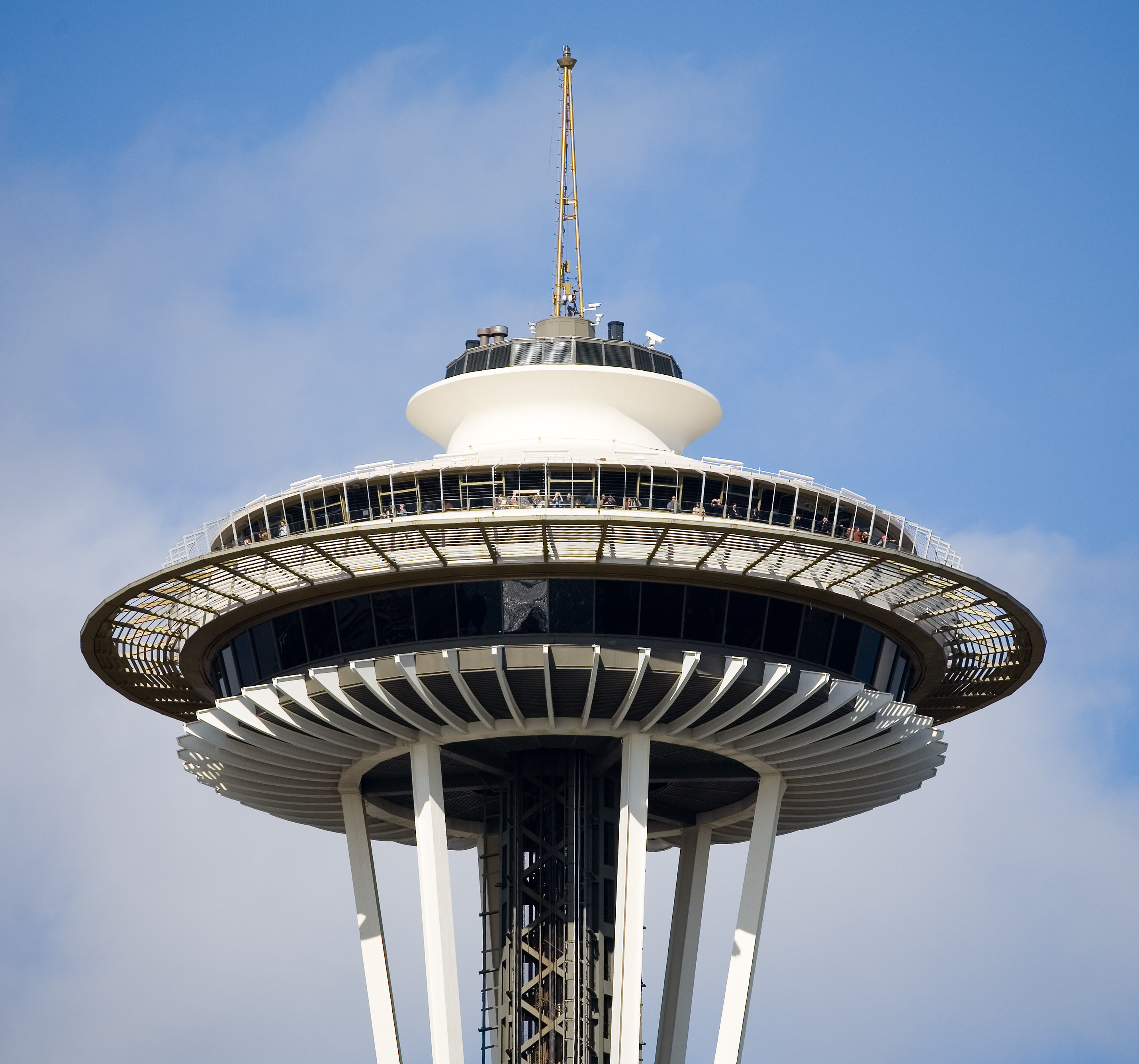
Observation and restaurant floors in 2007

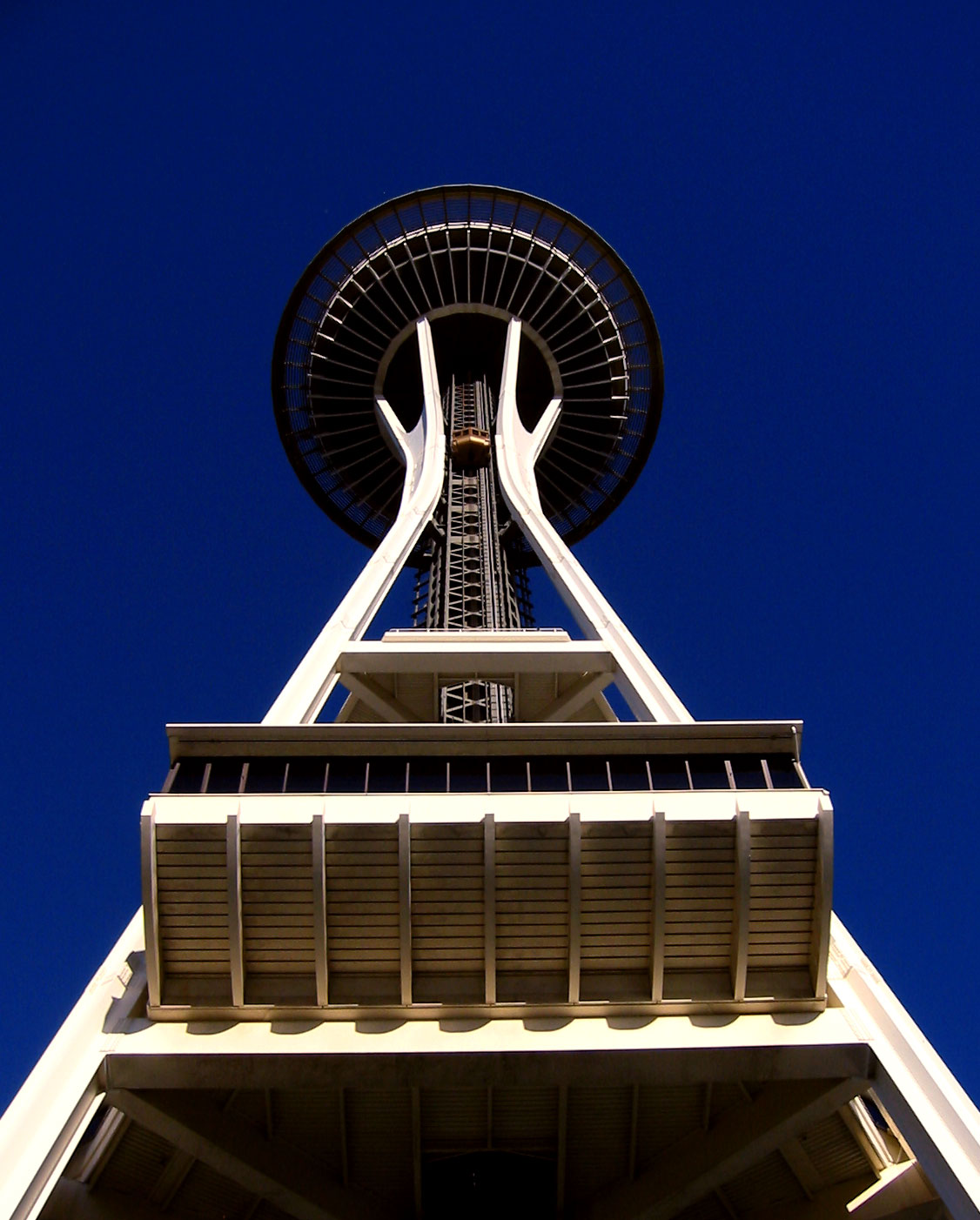
View from the base of the Needle

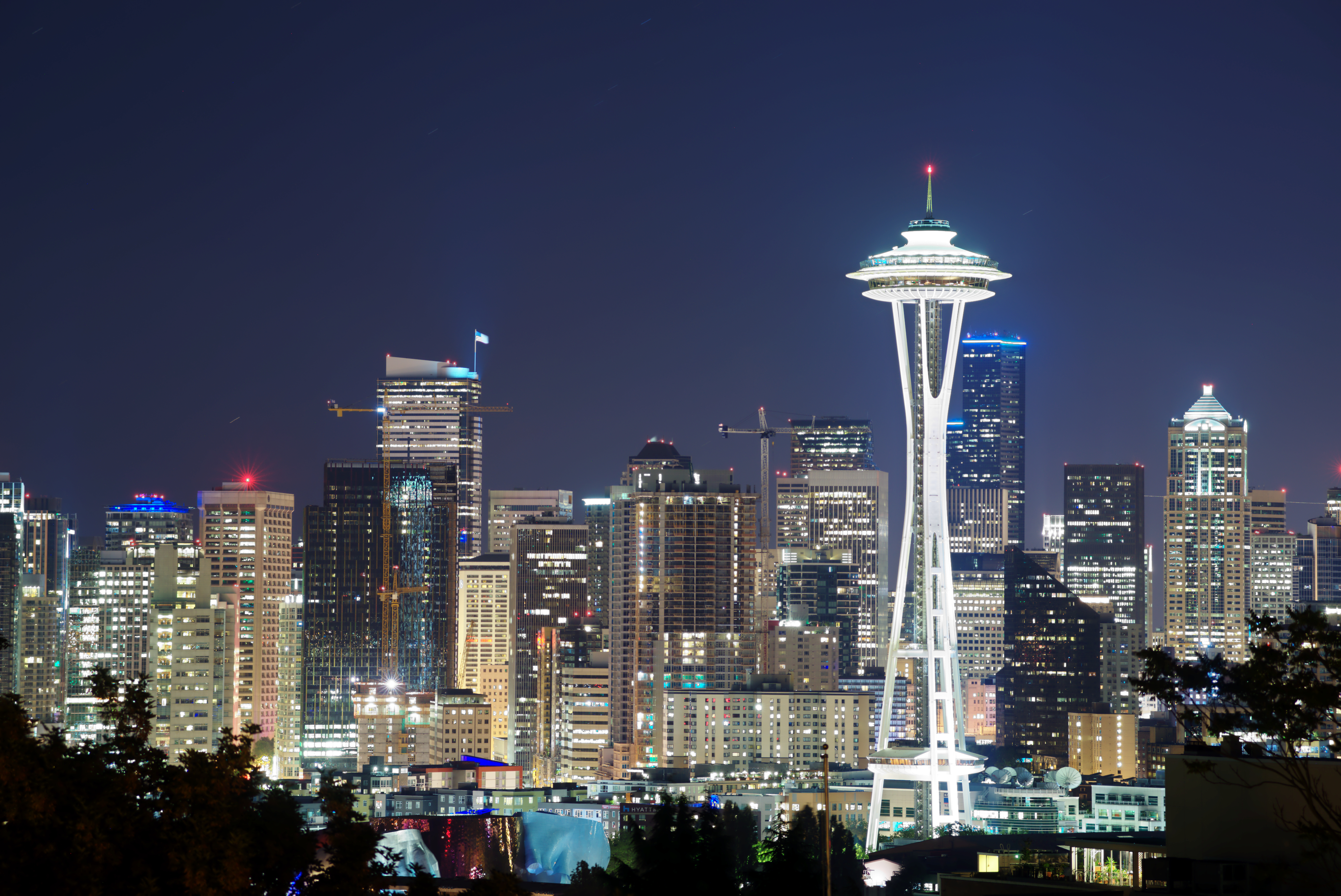
Nighttime illumination

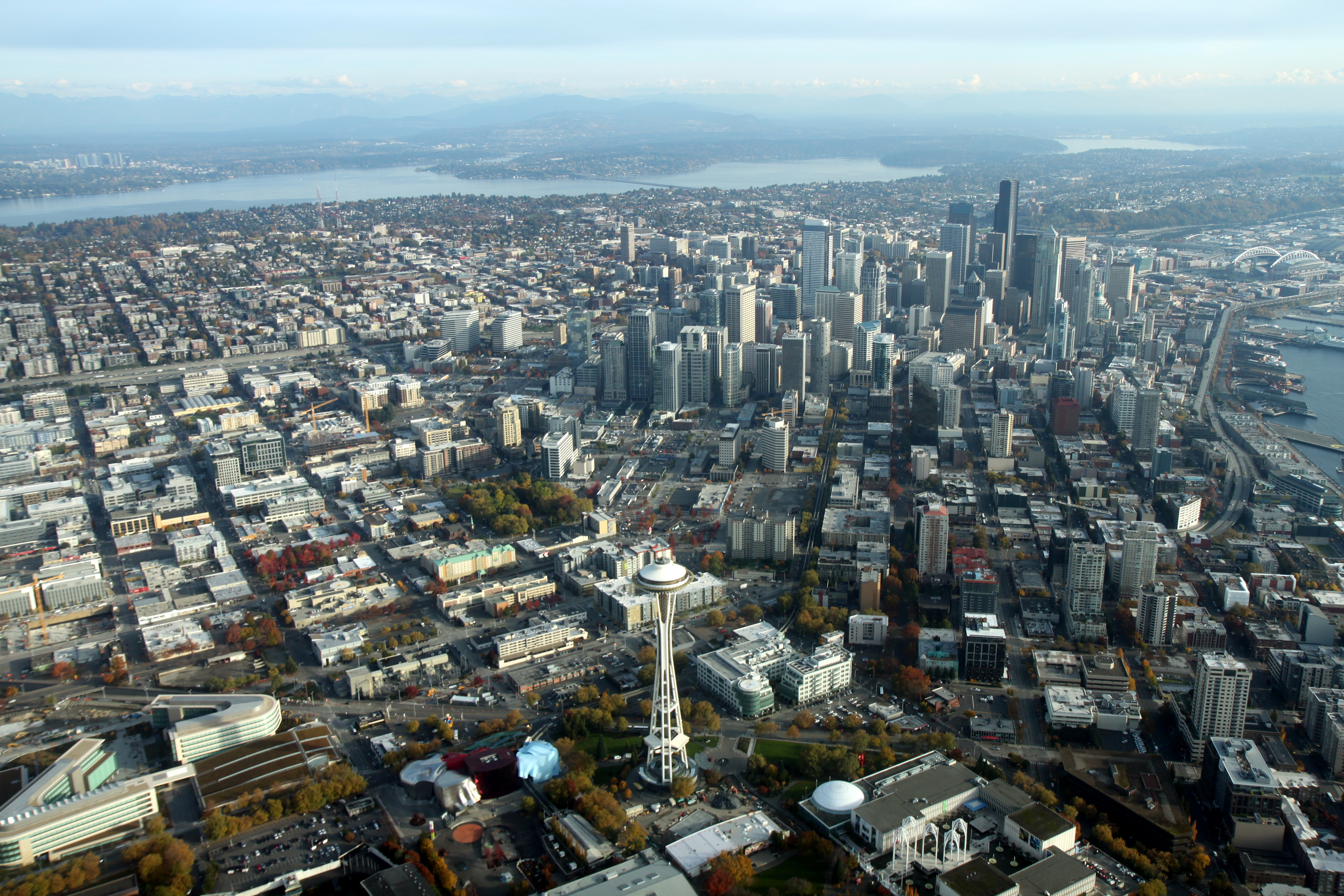
Location relative to downtown Seattle

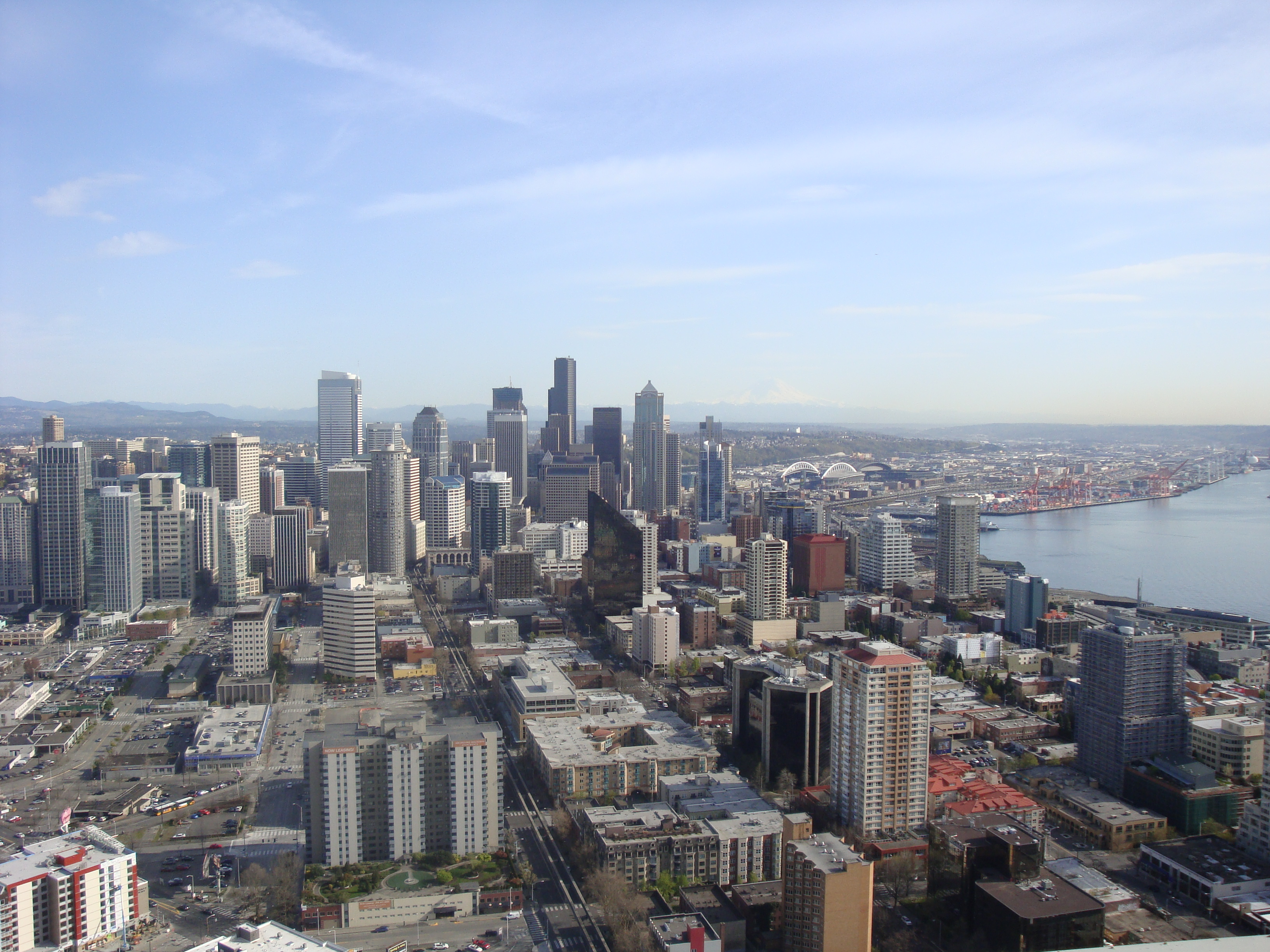
View of downtown from the observation deck

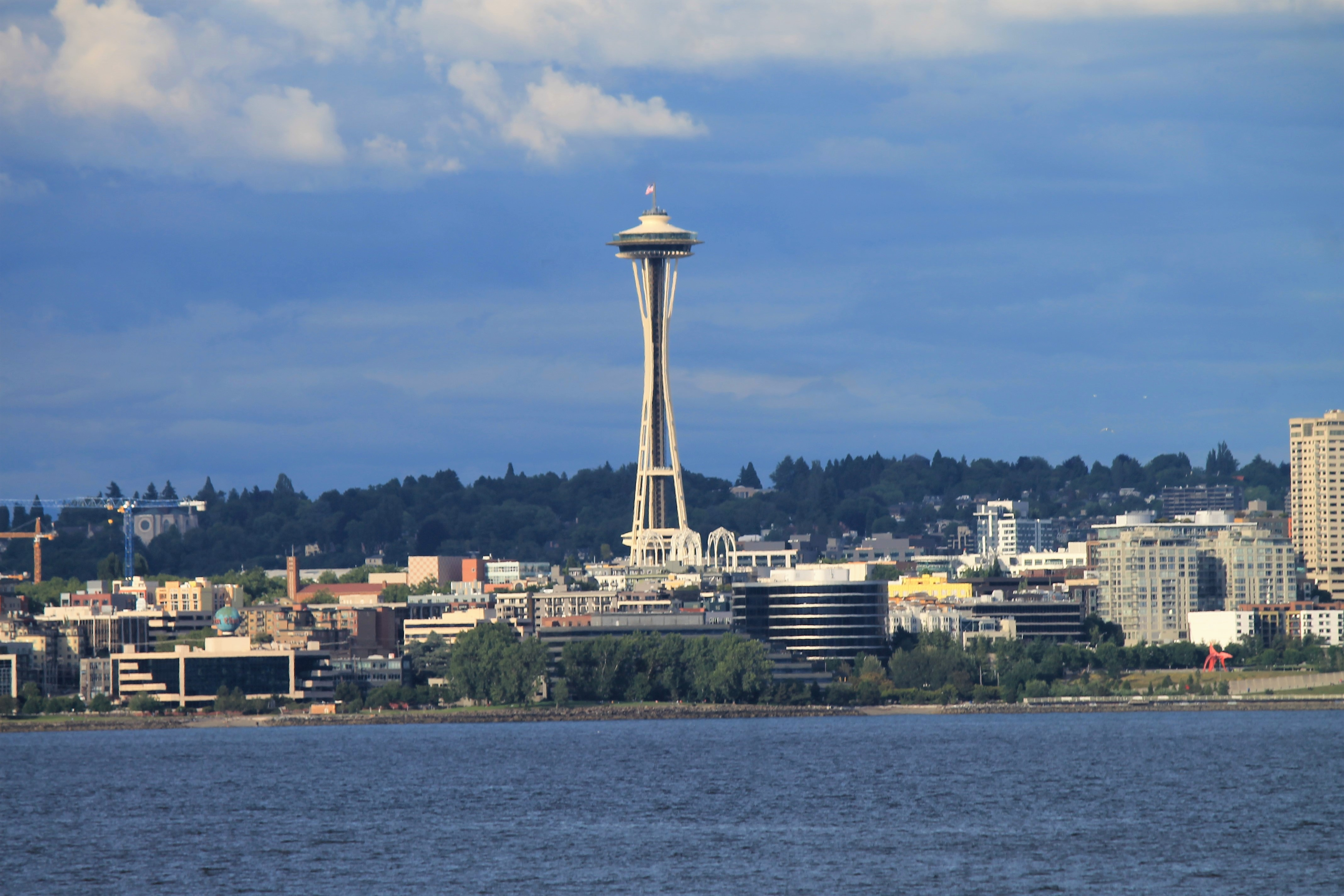
Space Needle seen from the ferry Wenatchee on Puget Sound

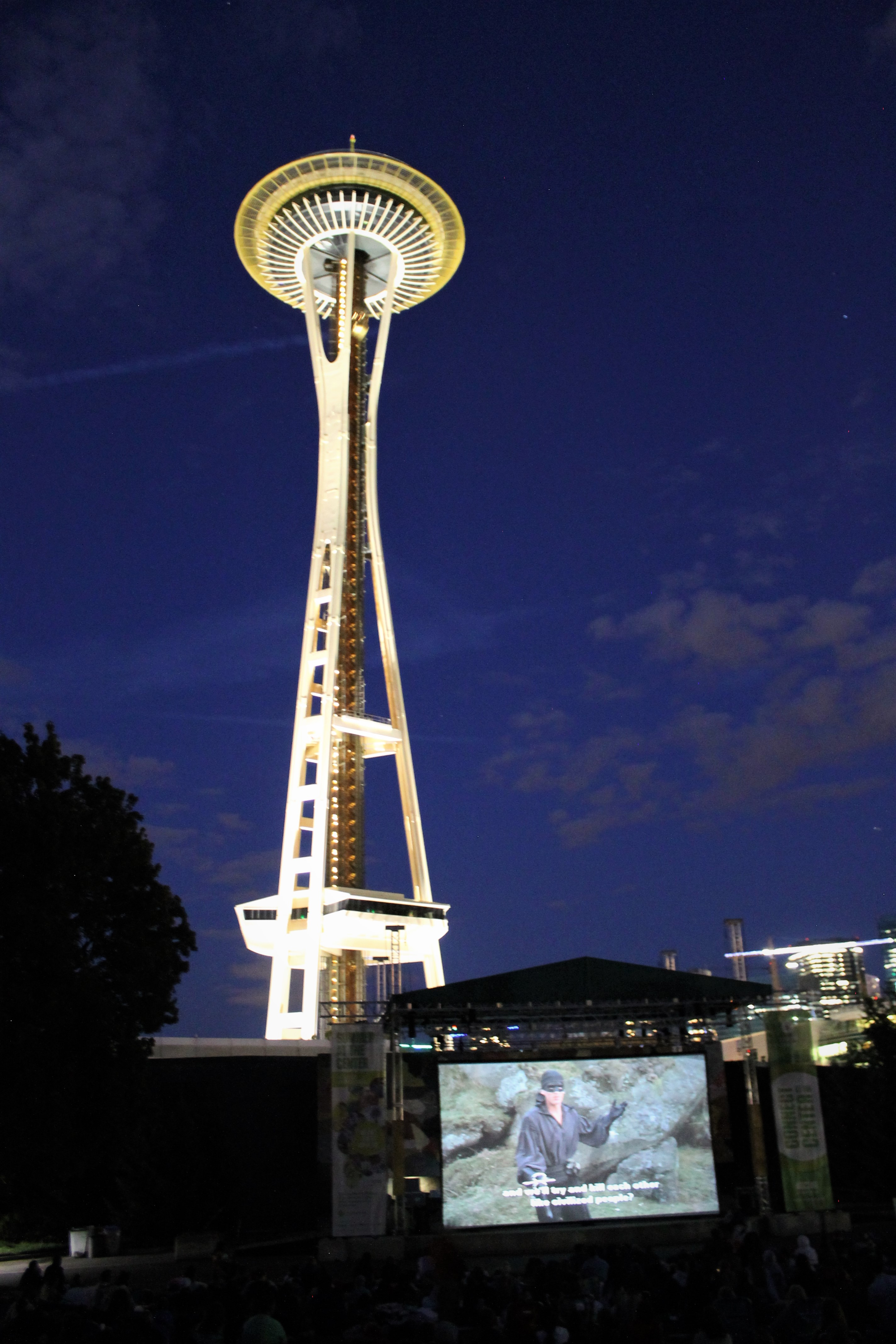
Movie at the Mural underneath the Space Needle

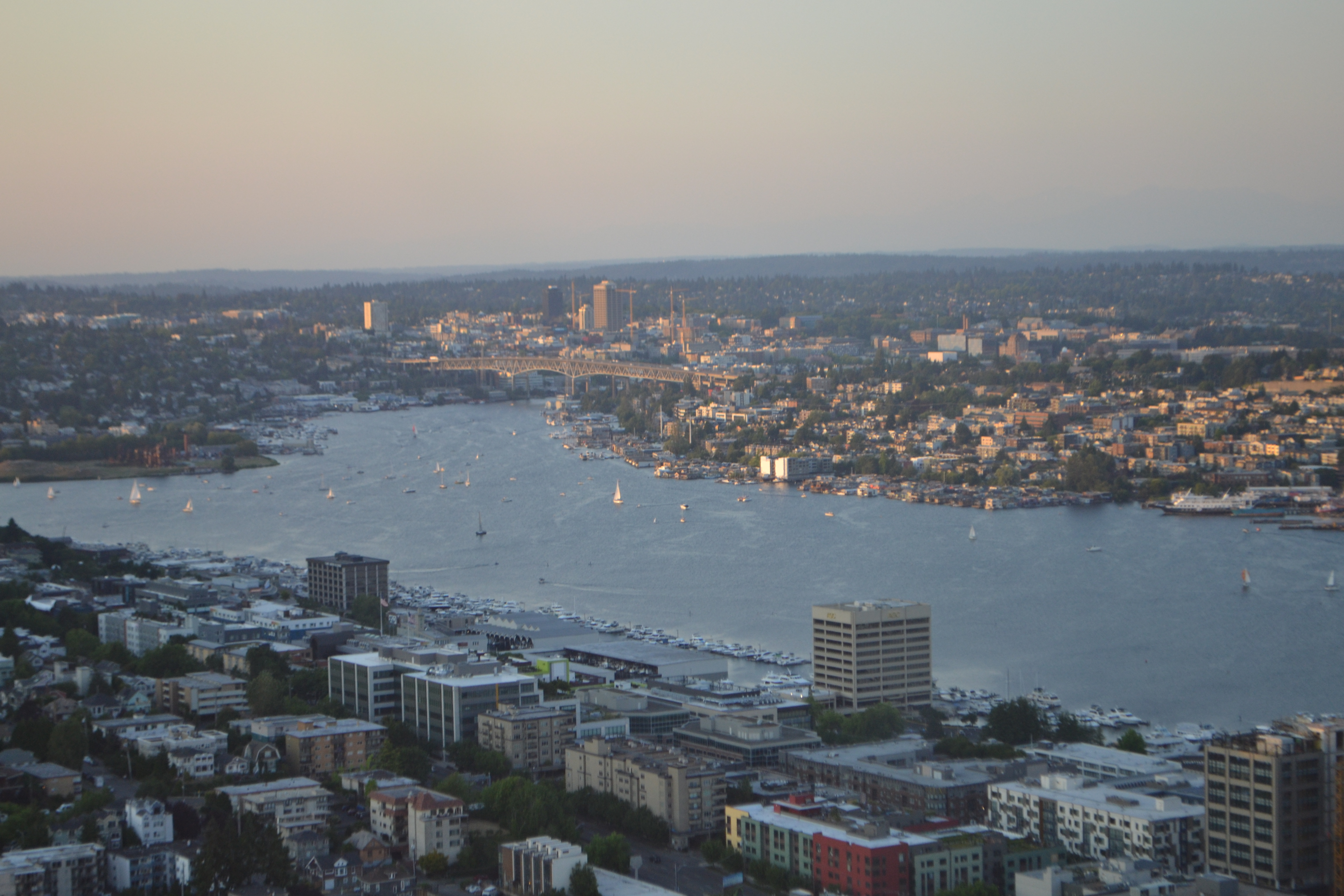
A view of Seattle from the Space Needle

== See also ==
- List of tallest buildings in Seattle
- List of towers
- Näsinneula in Tampere, Finland
- Sydney Tower in Sydney, Australia
- Skylon Tower in Niagara Falls, Ontario
- Namsan Seoul Tower in Seoul, South Korea
