= CDK Global =

American automotive dealer services company

CDK Global, Inc.
- Type: Private
- Industry: Software
- Founded: 2014; 12 years ago
- Headquarters: Austin, Texas, U.S.
- Key people: Brian P. MacDonald (president & CEO)
- Products: Software for automotive retail
- Revenue: ▲US$1.67 billion (2021)
- Operating income: ▼US$425 million (2021)
- Net income: ▲US$1.03 billion (2021)
- Total assets: ▼US$2.71 billion (2021)
- Total equity: ▲US$495 million (2021)
- Owner: Brookfield Business Partners
- Number of employees: 6,500 (2021)
- Website: cdkglobal.com

CDK Global Inc. is an American multinational corporation based in Austin, Texas, providing data and technology to the automotive, heavy truck, recreation, and heavy equipment industries.

The company has 37 locations in 25 countries and its products are sold in over 100 countries, though most of its customers are in the United States. In 2020, the company ranked 911 on the Fortune 1000 list of the largest United States corporations by total revenue.

== Products ==
CDK Global provides integrated information technology and digital marketing to the automotive, heavy truck, recreation, and heavy equipment industries. The company's products help to integrate clients’ buying processes and include targeted advertising and marketing, as well as products for the sale, financing, insuring, parts supply, repair, and maintenance of vehicles. Competitors include Reynolds and Reynolds, Tekion, and Dealertrack.

== History ==
The company has its origins as the Dealer Services division of Automatic Data Processing (ADP), which was formed in 1973 after ADP acquired National Inventory Control System, Portland OR (NICS) and Computer System Inc., Cincinnati, OH (CSI) providing computerized Accounting, Financial Reporting, Sales Analysis, Lease Accounting, Parts Inventory Control, Customer Relations, Management Systems for both Sales and Service, and Payroll Services for automotive dealerships. As ADP Dealer Services, the division was subsequently built up of more than 30 acquisitions completed over the next 41 years.

=== Acquisitions and sales ===
In 2006, ADP acquired BZ Results.

On October 1, 2014, ADP Dealer Services division was spun-off to form the independent company CDK Global. The CDK in the company's name was inspired from different acquisitions; C from Cobalt Digital Marketing, D from the original ADP Dealer Services business, and K from Kerridge Computer Company, a UK-based dealer management system (DMS) supplier acquired by ADP in 2005.

In May 2017, CDK Global announced its intention to acquire rival DMS supplier Auto/Mate Dealership Systems, but the proposed acquisition was blocked by the Federal Trade Commission in March 2018 on the grounds that it would reduce competition in an already concentrated market.

In 2020, CDK Global announced the sale of its international operations (to be called Keyloop) to Francisco Partners, as an effort to focus more on its North American business.

In 2021, CDK acquired Roadster, a software platform for dealerships to sell vehicles online, for $360 million in cash.

On April 7, 2022, CDK Global agreed to be acquired by Brookfield Business Partners and institutional partners for a total enterprise value of $8.3 billion. The deal offered CDK investors $54.87 for each share held, representing a 30% premium. Brookfield completed the deal on July 6, 2022.

On August 27, 2026, CDK announced Sudhakar Ramakrishna, the current CEO of SolarWinds, would take over the CEO role from Brian MacDonald, effective October 5.

=== June 2024 ransomware attack ===
On June 19, 2024, CDK experienced a ransomware attack that took most of its services offline, disrupting thousands of car dealerships across the US and Canada. An Eastern European and Russian hacker group, thought by security researchers to be BlackSuit, claimed responsibility and demanded tens of millions of dollars in ransom. On June 21, CDK paid $25 million in bitcoin to a cryptocurrency account connected with BlackSuit, and on June 23, began the process of restoring services, later advising that the work would not be completed before June 30. By July 4, access for nearly all dealers had been restored.

Shares in CDK's parent company lost over 5.7% value in the wake of the attack, while share prices of large auto dealers Sonic, Group 1 and AutoNation dropped up to 4.4%. JD Power estimated that due to the outage, U.S. retail unit sales in June 2024 would decrease by up to 7.2% from June 2023. At least eight lawsuits alleging negligence were filed against CDK by dealerships whose operations were affected by the outage. Within the first two weeks, the dealers recorded financial losses amounting to approximately $605 million.

== Antitrust lawsuits ==
In May 2017, CDK was sued, along with DMS supplier Reynolds and Reynolds, by data integration service provider Authenticom, which alleged that the two companies engaged in anti-competitive conduct and violated antitrust law by conspiring to block third-party access to their data systems in order to create a duopoly. In July 2017, District Judge James Peterson granted a preliminary injunction against CDK and Reynolds and Reynolds, ruling that there was sufficient evidence to find "the existence of a per se illegal horizontal conspiracy" between CDK and Reynolds and Reynolds to divide the data integration market between them and block competitors, and requiring the two companies to "cease blocking Authenticom" from providing "data integration services to dealers who authorize Authenticom to provide this service." In November 2020, CDK settled its lawsuit with Authenticom, agreeing to make a one-time cash payment to Authenticom.

CDK agreed to pay $100 million plus $250,000 for notice and administration costs to resolve claims involving an alleged conspiracy by CDK and Reynolds to charge unlawful prices in the markets for DMS Services and Data Integration Services. Dealerships doing business with CDK from September 1, 2013 through August 15, 2024 were invited to join a class action lawsuit that paid out the settlement. On February 25, 2025, the court approved the settlement payout.

In 2018, software vendor Autoloop sued CDK for violating antitrust law, accusing CDK of restricting access to data and causing vendors to pay hundreds of millions of dollars in overcharges. The lawsuit was granted class action status in July 2024.

In December 2024, Tekion filed a federal antitrust lawsuit against CDK, alleging that CDK attempted to illegally monopolize the DMS market by withholding or delaying dealers' access to operations data, making it harder for dealers to switch to alternative management systems and leading dealers to pay higher prices. In November 2026, CEO Dan Clara reported that Asbury Automotive Group Inc. had finished replacing CDK Global with Tekion dealership management systems.
