= Serendipity the Pink Dragon =

Japanese anime television series

ピュア島の仲間たち (Pyuatō no Nakama-tachi)
- Genre: Adventure, coming of age, comedy drama
- Anime television series
- Directed by: Nobuo Onuki
- Produced by: Shigeto Takahashi
- Written by: Sumiko Nakao; Tsunehisa Ito
- Music by: Takeo Watanabe
- Studio: Zuiyo Enterprise; Dragon Production; Shaft; Studio Unicorn; Tama Production
- Original network: NNS (NTV)
- Original run: July 1, 1983 – December 23, 1983
- Episodes: 26
- Related articles
- Serendipity (book series); Little Mouse on the Prairie

Serendipity the Pink Dragon (ピュア島の仲間たち, Pyuatō no Nakama-tachi; Serendipity Stories: Friends of Pure Island) is an anime television series produced by ZUIYO Enterprise that aired on NTV on July 1, 1983, ending on December 23. The series was based on the Serendipity books by Stephen Cosgrove and character designs for the animation version were done by Yōichi Kotabe. After a boy is shipwrecked on a deserted island, he finds a pink egg which hatches into the pink dragon (referred to as a dinosaur in the English-language theme song) Serendipity. The series follows their adventures on the island.

A feature-length English dub consisting of episodes from the TV series, directed by Jim Terry (Force Five), was released on home video in the United States on March 9, 1989, by Celebrity Home Entertainment. The boy's name was changed from Kōna to "Bobby" in the English version. The TV series itself has also been aired in France, as Biniky le Dragon Rose (Biniky the Pink Dragon), in Italy as Rosaura, in Iran as Serendipity, in Spain as Biniki, el dragón rosa, and in Turkey as Şekerpembe. There has not been a DVD release of the English dub as of 2017.

== Story ==
A boy named Kona, has an accident with his parents who were investigating the Southern Ocean, and flows to the isolated Pure Island in the South Sea with a large pink egg. The pink sea dragon Serendipity, born from the pink egg, and Kona, who is deeply moved, are allowed to live on the island with the mermaid named Lola, who is the queen of Pure Island. Meanwhile, the pirate captain Smudge attacks and tries to take possession of the treasure Tear of the mermaid on the island. Kona, Serendipity, Lola and the other members of the island must work together to preserve the peace of Pure Island.

== Characters ==
Serendipity
Voiced by Mari Okamoto
A mysterious pink sea dragon lady, she protects the inhabitants of Pure Island with Kōna, but is also playful.
Kōna
Voiced by Michiko Nomura
A boy who decided to live on Pure Island after drifting, he is curious and hard to lose. Eventually, he fell in love with Pure Island and its inhabitants, and fighting enemies who is trying to harm them.
Pira-Pira
Voiced by Yūji Mitsuya
A colorful talking parakeet, Kōna first met him in a cage on a ship on an expedition to the South Pole and released him for his flying freedom. Although he sometimes spoiled Kōna, Serendipity and the inhabitants of Pure Island, he is even a good friend with them.
Captain Smudge
Voiced by Kōsei Tomita
Although he is the captain of his ship Ombolo, his only crew is Mudlark, his bird on his shoulder. He is greedy and pretending to be a big pirate. He is trying to get the treasure of Pure Island, "The mermaid tear" and Serendipity.
Prime Minister Dolf
Voiced by Kei Tomiyama
Prime minister of Pure Island, he is also the chairman of the World Congress of Fish Representatives. He has a gentle personality and loves princess Laura, and feels like a father for her. He has a good understanding and is an adviser of Kōna and Serendipity.
Princess Laura
Voiced by Yuri Nashiwa
A pretty mermaid princess who lives in the palace, she is also the queen of Pure Island. Her parents were killed by humans and she hated humans as enemies, but becomes friend with Kōna, who has a pure heart.
Akanatsu the Fruit Spirit
Voiced by Noriko Tsukase
Minta
Voiced by Rihoko Yoshida

== Miscellaneous characters ==
Mudlark
Captain Smudge's pet raven.
Long
A shark in the Pure Island.
Chap & Mestle
Voiced by Hirotaka Suzuoki (Chap)
Two flying fishes in the Pure Island, Chap is a blue male and Mestle is a red female.
Nulu Nulu
An eel in the Pure Island.
Kachi Kachi & Puly
Voiced by Tetsuo Mizutori (Kachi Kachi)
A crab couple in the Pure Island, Kachi Kachi is male and Puly is female. They have three children.
The Tentecks
Inhabitants in the Pure Island.
The Moais
A group of spiritual high rocks.

== Cast ==
Character	Japanese	English
Serendipity	Mari Okamoto	Barbara Goodson
Kōna	Michiko Nomura	Kathy Ritter
Pira Pira the Bird of Paradise	Yūji Mitsuya	Mona Marshall
Akanatsu the Fruit Spirit	Noriko Tsukase	Unknown
Prime Minister Dolf	Kei Tomiyama	Richard Rossner
Captain Sumaji	Kōsei Tomita	Jan Rabson
Princess Laura	Yuri Nashiwa	Kathy Ritter

=== Additional voices ===
- Cleo Rae
- Mr. Angelo
- Cody Walker
- David Monson
- Ginny Masters
- Harry Metrano
- Danielle Romeo
- Andrea Deschamps
- Geoffrey Deschamps

== Episodes ==
No.	Title	Original release date
1	"Yasashi no hamabe de tanjou" (優しの浜辺で誕生)	July 1, 1983
2	"Pyua shima no joou" (ピュア島の女王)	July 8, 1983
3	"Yousei-tachi no umi" (妖精たちの海)	July 15, 1983
4	"Taiyou to nakama-tachi" (太陽と仲間たち)	July 22, 1983
5	"Tentekku wa choukoku-ka" (テンテックは彫刻家)	July 29, 1983
6	"Tobidashita Pirapira" (飛び出したピラピラ)	August 5, 1983
7	"Kaori no hana saiban" (香りの花裁判)	August 12, 1983
8	"Roora hime no sainan" (ローラ姫の災難)	August 19, 1983
9	"Ya no tobu yashiki" (屋の飛ぶ屋敷)	August 26, 1983
10	"Umi no hoshi no sasayaki" (海の星の囁き)	September 2, 1983
11	"Yoru no sukooru" (夜のスコール)	September 9, 1983
12	"Kirereen-mura" (キレレーン村)	September 16, 1983
13	"Yashi to rubii" (椰子とルビー)	September 23, 1983
14	"Dai kaigi" (大会議)	September 30, 1983
15	"Yama mo kawa mo umi mo" (山も河も海も)	October 7, 1983
16	"Ningyo no namida" (人魚の涙)	October 14, 1983
17	"Minta no kokoro" (ミンタの心)	October 21, 1983
18	"Kaitei no yotto" (海底のヨット)	October 28, 1983
19	"Nankai no serenaado" (南海のセレナード)	November 4, 1983
20	"Kommata mondai" (困った問題)	November 11, 1983
21	"Sora no sangoshou" (空の珊瑚礁)	November 18, 1983
22	"Kodomo wa darenomono" (子供は誰のもの)	November 25, 1983
23	"Suihei-sen no taiyou" (水平線の太陽)	December 2, 1983
24	"Zendaimimon no daijigen" (前代未聞の大事件)	December 9, 1983
25	"Sumajji ni ai o" (スマッジに愛を)	December 16, 1983
26	"Yasashii mono wa un ga yoi" (優しいものは運がよい)	December 23, 1983
