= Serendipity (book series) =

Children's book series by Stephen Cosgrove

Serendipity is a series of children's books about animals and other creatures. The books were written by Stephen Cosgrove and illustrated by Robin James. The books are short stories with colorful illustrations that have a moral perspective.

Cosgrove wrote the books after searching for an easy to read book with a message to read to his then three-year-old daughter. After finding primarily large expensive books, Cosgrove teamed up with illustrator James to create low cost softcover books. After receiving an offer to publish the books only in hardcover, Cosgrove created his own publishing company Serendipity Press. The first four books of the Serendipity series were released in December 1973: Serendipity, The Dream Tree, Wheedle on the Needle, and The Muffin Muncher. Cosgrove merged Serendipity Press with the publishing company, Price/Stern/Sloan (now part of Penguin Random House) in 1978 so that Cosgrove could focus on writing. Cosgrove decided to re-edit his earlier books, which have been republished with the changes. To date, there are 70 books in the series, written from the kindergarten to grade three levels.

The animals in the Serendipity series include bears, cats, dogs, horses, squirrels, rabbits, and mythical creatures such as unicorns, dragons, sea monsters, and pegasus. Cosgrove also invented his own creatures such as the wheedle, hucklebug and kritter. The books present moral issues such as growing up, disabilities, abuse, fear, friendship, prejudice, gossip, fat shaming, and helping the environment.

== Adaptations ==
The book series was adapted into a 26-episode anime series entitled Serendipity the Pink Dragon and 26-episode cartoon series Little Mouse on the Prairie.

At least 25 of the books were translated into Spanish (based on the list in El Dragon Gloton), at least 6 in Italian (by Arnoldo Mondadori Editore) and also 6 in French, by Nathan éditeur in 1979, under the series name Les contes du dragon rose.

== List of books in the Serendipity series ==
Title	Copyright year	Moral
Bangalee	1976	Best clean up your junk, cause here comes the Grunk!
Buttermilk	1986	The dark of night can make ordinary things seem scary.
Buttermilk Bear	1987	An open mind is the key to conquering all kinds of prejudice.
Butterwings	1993	Laughing at yourself can be the most fun of all.
Cap'n Smudge	1977	Everyone deserves a chance to do something good.
Catundra	1978	Healthy food and exercise keep you well in body and mind.
Crabby Gabby	1985	Having fun while playing a game is more important than winning.
Creolé	1975	Never, never judge a book by the way you think it's covered, for inside that tattered binding there is a lot to be discovered.
Crickle-Crack	1987	It's important to know when to say "no".
Dragolin	1984	You can be your best if you really believe in yourself.
Dream Tree	1974	Though it is sometimes hard to wait, growing up comes soon enough.
Fanny	1986	Being handicapped is only a state of mind.
Feather Fin	1983	There's no place like home.
Flutterby	1976	Be just who you are.
Flutterby Fly	1984	Gossip is harmful—and usually filled with lies.
Frazzle	1990	Children need love and attention from the very beginning.
Gabby	1983	Silence can be golden. Learn to listen to others.
Gigglesnitcher	1988	In giving happiness to others, you will find it yourself.
Glitterby Baby	1985	Sometimes love forces us to make difficult choices.
The Gnome from Nome	1974	Love and friendship can warm the coldest day.
The Grumpling	1989	Good manners are important.
Hucklebug	1975	Even though you have chores to do, home is still the place to be.
In Search of the Saveopotomus	1974	It's best to take only what you need.
Jake O'Shawnasey	1975	If you believe in yourself, you can do anything.
Jalopy	1990	Language can sometimes be used as a barrier.
Jingle Bear	1985	Father Snow will only come when all little bears are asleep.
Kartusch	1978	Beauty is not only in the eye, but in all of the senses.
Kiyomi	1984	Conceit can make you blind to what is really beautiful.
Lady Rose	1990	Those who are gone are never forgotten.
Leo the Lop	1977	You're special because you're you.
Leo the Lop: Tail 2	1979	You are best just who you are.
Leo the Lop: Tail 3	1980	You can always play with you.
Leo the Lop: Tail 4 (a.k.a. Grampa Lop)	1981	Make time for stories and books.
Little Mouse on the Prairie	1978	Laughter makes work much easier.
Maui-Maui	1978	Take only what you need from nature.
Maynard's Mermaid	1993	Your own imagination can be a good friend.
Memily	1987	Whether you're short, tall or medium, you're perfect just as you are.
Ming Ling	1983	Sharing your environment with others is rewarding.
Minikin	1984	You're special just the way you are.
Misty Morgan	1987	Remember that there is a time for work and a time for play.
Morgan and Me	1975	Treat others the way you would like them to treat you.
Morgan and Yew	1982	Love is the most important possession we can have.
Morgan Mine	1982	To have a friend, you must be a friend.
Morgan Morning	1982	Sometimes we must lose in order to gain.
The Muffin Muncher	1974	When we work together there's more to share.
Mumkin	1986	Fear of losing what you have can rob you of the joy of sharing.
Napoleon's Rainbow	1994	Don't be afraid of change, it can be beautiful.
Nitter Pitter	1978	Vanity can cost you friends.
Persnickity	1988	We each have our own idea of perfection.
Pish-Posh	1986	Every creature is useful and special in its own way.
Poppyseed	1989	Being a big brother or sister is a special job.
Puddle Pine	2004	Protect the forests, for they are important to everyone.
Raz-ma-taz	1982	Showing off is not a good way to get loving attention.
Rhubarb	1988	To have a friend, you must be a friend.
Sadie	1994	True friendship grows out of love, not need.
Sassafrass	1988	Kindness is always appreciated more than sarcasm.
Serendipity	1974	Knowing who you really are will bring you happiness.
Shimmeree	1980	Don't be afraid of what is different from you.
Snaffles	1980	We all have emotions and show them.
Sniffles	1988	When we exaggerate everything, we often forget what the truth is.
Sooty Foot	2003	Friends don't take advantage of each other.
Squabbles	1990	It is good to help friends in trouble.
Squeakers	1987	It is important to learn to say "no" to situations that make you uncomfortable.
Tee Tee	1983	Learning who we are is an important lesson.
Tickle's Tale	1987	Sometimes too much curiosity can get you into trouble.
Trafalgar True	1980	Learning to share can bring us closer together.
Trapper	1981	Everyone can enjoy nature if we all let it be.
Wheedle on the Needle	1974	Cooperation can solve almost any problem.
Zippity Zoom	1989	It is important to take the time to enjoy life.
Tale of Three Tails	1973	
