= Wheedle =

- First appearance: 1974
- Written by: Stephen Cosgrove
- Illustrated by: Robin James

In-universe information
- Home: Seattle, Washington

The Wheedle is the title character of a popular children's book by author Stephen Cosgrove. The character eventually evolved into a popular mascot generally associated with the city of Seattle.

== Children's book character ==
=== Original story ===
Wheedle on the Needle (Serendipity Books, 1974), written by Stephen Cosgrove and illustrated by Robin James, is about a large, round, furry creature called the Wheedle who lived in the Northwest. Bothered by the whistling of workers first settling the city of Seattle, the creature was unable to sleep and became irritable, eventually moving to Mount Rainier to escape the noise. The Wheedle slept there peacefully for many years, his red nose blinking, until the region's growth brought people – and their whistling – to his doorstep once again. In an effort to silence the noise, the Wheedle gathered clouds in a large sack atop Mt. Rainier, returned to Seattle, climbed atop the Space Needle, and threw them into the sky to make it rain. With their lips wet from precipitation, the city's residents were unable to whistle, and the creature once again had some peace and quiet. Upset, the people sent the mayor to try to convince the Wheedle to stop the rain; when the creature explained his problem, the mayor had a giant pair of earmuffs constructed to muffle the disagreeable warbling. When they were presented to him, "The Wheedle placed them over his ears, and smiled for the first time in years." In appreciation, the Wheedle gathered up all the clouds, put them back in his bag, and fell fast asleep – and once again, his big red nose began to blink. The book ends with a short poem: There's a Wheedle/On the Needle/I know just what/You're thinking/But if you look up/Late at night/You'll see/His red nose blinking.

Cosgrove came up with the idea of Wheedle at a meeting with the Space Needle team in November 1973. The story was written over a weekend and the original illustration created by James was of a green Wheedle. As of the 50th anniversary (February 2024), Cosgrove estimates that 2.5 million copies of the book have been sold.

=== Later editions ===
In 2002 a second edition of the book was published. The story was significantly rewritten, generally matching the existing illustrations, but eliminating environmental themes present in the original story and altering it so that the Wheedle was not native to the Seattle area.

In 2009 after battling with Penguin US for over 15 years, the rights to the book Wheedle on the Needle reverted to Cosgrove. Under a new agreement with Sasquatch Books of Seattle, Cosgrove has created a third edition which returns to the tone and themes of the original book, while making some revisions for quality. The new edition was released in spring of 2010. The Wheedle is now back home, in Seattle.

=== Other books ===
There were also two other children's book featuring the Wheedle, entitled "How to plant a Bunch of Stuff" and "How to Cook a Bunch of Stuff." The cookbook for kids features a pictorial; essay of the Wheedle demonstrating how to cook a "bunch of stuff" and to appreciate what their mothers do in the kitchen. The cookbook was by Stephen Cosgrove with recipes by Nancy Roberts. The garden book was by Stephen Cosgrove with planting tips by Ed Hume.

In 2011 "Wheedle and the Noodle" was published. A mewling sound wakes up Wheedle and he searches the city of Seattle to find where it's coming from.

== Seattle mascot ==
From 1978 through 1985 the Wheedle was the official mascot of the NBA's Seattle SuperSonics, and was part of the organization when they won their only NBA Championship to date (in 1979). It would not be until 1993 that the Sonics would debut a new mascot, Squatch, who was the team's mascot until 2008. While representing the Sonics, the character wore a jersey bearing number 0. Robert Crosby performed the Wheedle as Seattle hosted the NCAA's Final Four for the first time. Toying with Brent Musberger on the sidelines, as well as in celebration with Georgetown's Patrick Ewing, it was a memorable highlight in the Wheedle's career. That same year Seattle acknowledged the Wheedle as an icon, honoring Wheedle as the Torchlight Parade's Grand Marshal. During the early years of the Wheedle's Sonics tenure, Laurel Brown, a member of the Sonics staff, performed as the Wheedle, the first female mascot of an NBA team. Her dance moves distinguished her from other mascots of that time.

The Wheedle was also the official mascot of the Space Needle from the late 1970s until 1984. In May 1982 the Space Needle opened a new addition at its 100-foot (30 m) level amidst controversy about altering the then 20-year-old structure, a mixed-use restaurant and banquet facility called "The Wheedle in the Needle". The facility existed as a restaurant for only about a year, before it was converted to a full-time banquet facility (now referred to as the "Skyline Level"). The Space Needle adopted a new mascot, "Sneedle," in 1997; however, it appears that the character is no longer in use.

In 1993 the Wheedle became the mascot for KOMO-TV, Seattle's ABC affiliate, and appeared at many events wearing a KOMO hat and T-shirt. The character represented KOMO for several years before being unofficially retired in the late 1990s.

For several years, the Wheedle could be seen encased in a block of plastic "ice," in a small SuperSonics museum near the Sonics & Storm Team Shop at Seattle's KeyArena. Following the relocation of the team to Oklahoma City, its whereabouts are unknown.

In 2012, Wheedle was the mascot for the "Take Winter By Storm" campaign to help people get prepared for bad weather and natural disasters.

== Music industry ==
In 1974 the Seattle band Annakonda (originally from Spokane) recorded a funky instrumental track called "Wheedle's Groove." The song got significant airplay in the Seattle area and was released as a single a few years later, after a local radio station adopted it as the theme song for the SuperSonics during their run to the 1978 NBA Finals. In 2004 the song was part of a compilation CD entitled "Wheedle's Groove: Seattle's Finest in Funk and Soul - 1965-75," on Seattle-based Light in the Attic Records. Similar Seattle funk and soul history was covered by Jennifer Maas's 2009 documentary of the same name. As of 2010 a group of musicians, largely veterans of these bands, have reunited to perform under the name Wheedle's Groove. They have a CD, Kearney Barton (2009) on Light in the Attic.
