= BrandSafway =

Construction, engineering and safety company

- Type: Private
- Industry: Access & Industrial Services
- Founded: 1919
- Headquarters: Atlanta, Georgia
- Area served: Global
- Key people: Gabe McCabe (President & CEO)
- Number of employees: 32,000+
- Website: www.brandsafway.com

BrandSafway is a construction and civil engineering company in the United States. BrandSafway has customers in 30 countries and has annual sales of 5 billion per year. The company provides Safety equipment to businesses around the world. They have 114 locations in the United States and Canada. The company has a total of 253 locations around the world.

== History ==
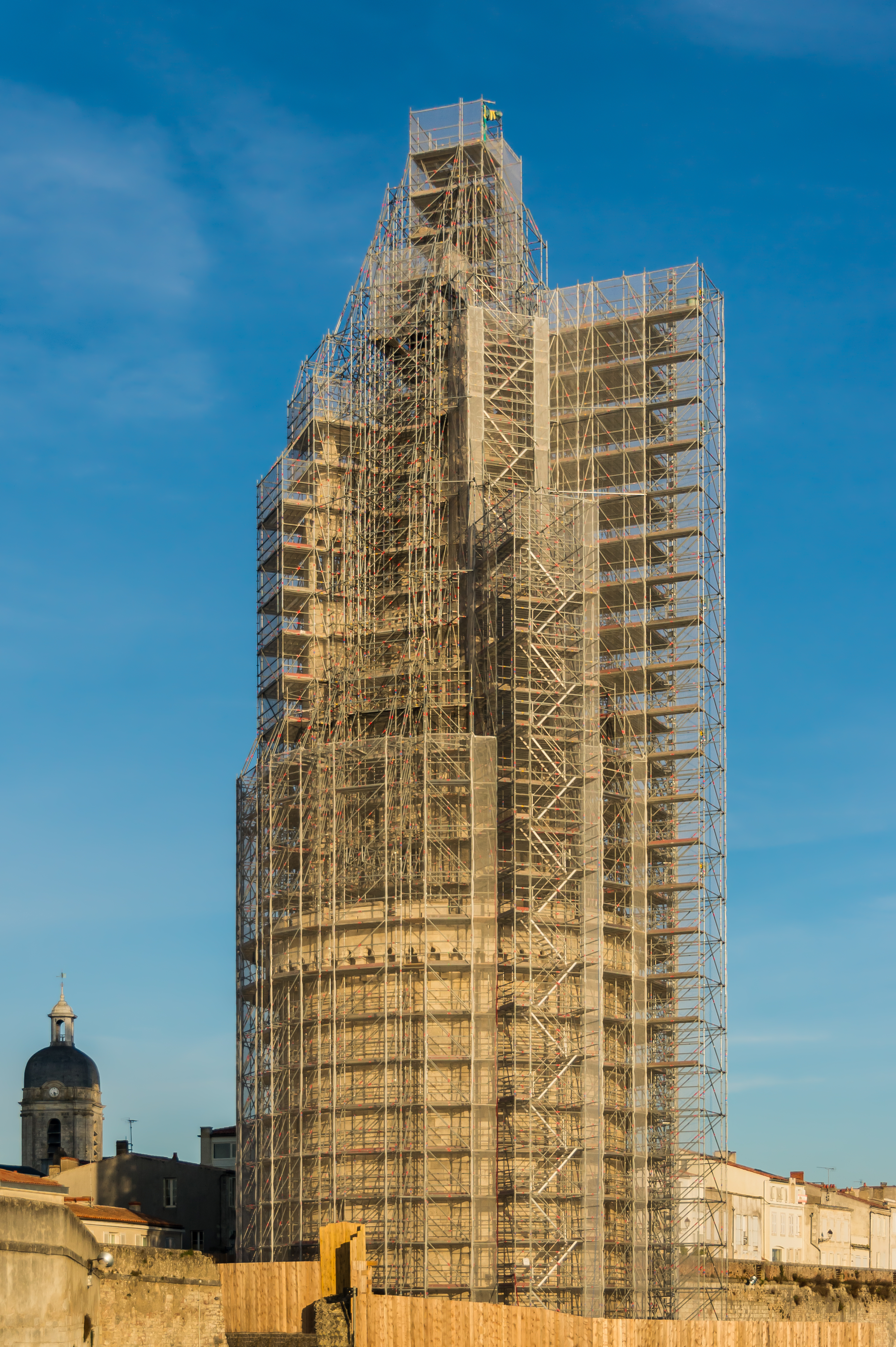
An Example of scaffolding around the Lantern Tower in La Rochelle

The company was started in 1919 and is headquartered in Georgia. Over the years the company expanded to other countries. The company has provided safety equipment on construction sites.

In 2017, the company began to focus on safety equipment which would be needed to improve infrastructure. Bridges and other Infrastructure has begun to age in North America and BrandSafway began to focus on supplying the safety equipment which will be needed.

In 2019, the company had over 38,000 employees. Brookfield Business Partners bought 45% of the company in September 2019. BrandSafway was valued at $6.7 billion at the time of the purchase.

The company is often contracted to provide safety equipment for complicated jobs. Recently they provided scaffolding for the 120 year old Milwaukee City Hall in Milwaukee, Wisconsin and the Old Cathedral in St. Louis, Missouri. In December 2019 the company was hired to provide safety equipment and scaffolding for work on the Space Needle in Seattle, Washington.

In January 2020, BrandSafway announced the purchase of AGF Access Group, a Quebec-based construction company.

In 2021, BrandSafway acquired Brace Industrial Group for an undisclosed amount. Brace provides scaffolding, insulation, fireproofing, heat tracing, industrial siding and decking, abrasive blasting, painting, specialty coatings, lead and asbestos abatement, concrete repair and refractory.

In January 2025, Gabriel McCabe took over as President and CEO, following Karl Fessenden's retirment.

=== Locations ===
The company's global headquarters is in Atlanta, Georgia. The company has 253 locations around the world.
