= Brookfield Business Corporation =

Publicly traded limited partnership

Brookfield Business Corporation L.P.
- Type: Public
- Traded as: NYSE: BBU; TSX: BBU.UN
- Industry: Private equity
- Founded: June 2016; 10 years ago
- Headquarters: Toronto, Ontario, Canada
- Area served: Worldwide
- Key people: Anuj Ranjan (CEO); Cyrus Madon (executive chairman)
- Services: Financial services
- Total assets: $75 billion (2024)
- Parent: Brookfield Corporation
- Website: bbu.brookfield.com

Brookfield Business Corporation L.P. is a publicly traded limited partnership and the primary public vehicle through which Brookfield Corporation, its parent company, owns and operates the business services and industrial operations of its private equity group. It was formed through a spin-off from Brookfield Asset Management (now named Brookfield Corporation) in June 2016.

== History ==
Its units trade on the Toronto Stock Exchange (BBU.UN) and New York Stock Exchange (BBU). Brookfield Business Partners is led by Chief Executive Officer Anuj Ranjan who joined Brookfield Asset Management in 2006, and leads its global private equity group, and is a managing partner of the parent company. Cyrus Madon, who joined Brookfield in 1998, is executive chairman.

In 2016, the company made its first major acquisition, agreeing to acquire a 70% stake in Brazil's largest private water and sewage company, Odebrecht Ambiental, with the remaining 30% continuing to be held by Fundo de Investimento do Fundo de Garantia do Tempo de Servico. The company was renamed BRK Ambiental.

In 2017, the company sold Maax, a bathroom fixtures maker, to American Bath for more than twice the value it acquired it for in 2008. In the first quarter of 2017, the company announced an agreement to acquire an approximate 85% stake in Greenergy, a supplier of road fuels in the UK, and an agreement to purchase Loblaw Companies' network of gas stations (which were rebranded afterwards to Mobil under a franchise agreement with Imperial Oil).

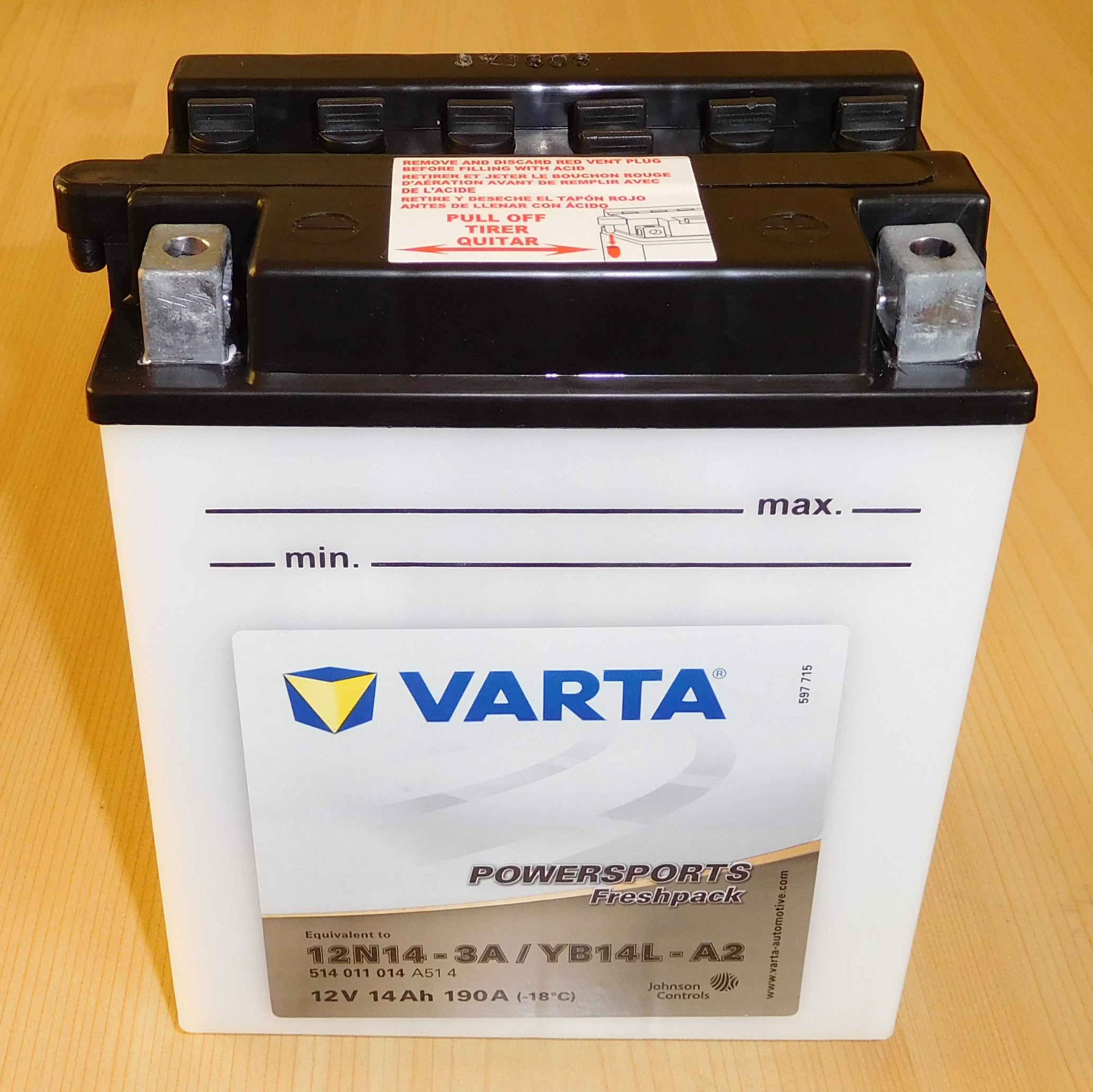
Varta automotive battery

On April 6, 2018, Toshiba completed its sale of Westinghouse Electric Company to Brookfield Asset Management, through its subsidiary, Brookfield Business Partners, and other partners. In 2018 the company also bought the automotive battery division from Johnson Controls, including the Varta brand for car batteries and the Heliar, LTH, Optima, Delkor and MAC brands.

In 2019, Brookfield Business Partners bought 45% of the company BrandSafway. BrandSafway was valued at $6.7 billion at the time of the purchase.

In October 2021, Brookfield announced that it would acquire Scientific Games' lottery division for $6.05 billion.

In April 2022, it was announced that Brookfield would be acquiring the auto dealer services company CDK Global for $6.41 billion. The deal was finalized in July 2022. A cyberattack on CDK Global in June 2024 disrupted around 15,000 North American car dealerships, with the company reportedly paying $25 million in ransom to restore operations.
