= Stephen Cosgrove (writer) =

American author and toy designer

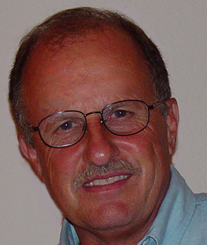
- Cosgrove in 2009
- Born: July 26, 1945 (age 80); Metaline Falls, Washington, U.S.
- Occupation: Children's author
- Website: Official Website

Stephen E. Cosgrove (born July 26, 1945) is a children's author and toy designer. He is known for Serendipity, a series of children's books. The series was adapted into a 26-episode anime, Serendipity the Pink Dragon.

== Early life and education ==
Cosgrove was born in Metaline Falls, Washington and raised in Kennewick, Washington, then Burley and Boise, Idaho. He attended Borah High School in Boise, Idaho. Growing up, Cosgrove was greatly influenced by Aesop's Fables.

In 1963, he received a scholarship for and attended Stephens College in Columbia, Missouri.

== Writing career ==
In 1973, Cosgrove teamed with illustrator Robin James, and wrote his first four books which began the Serendipity Series: "Serendipity", "Wheedle on the Needle", "The Dream Tree", and "The Muffin Muncher". His goal in writing these books was to create interesting, fun, affordable books that contained a moral in each story. The next year, a large New York publishing company offered Cosgrove a contract, but he refused and continued on in his search for a publisher. Three months later, Cosgrove established his own publishing company, Serendipity Press, where he was the author, publisher, shipping clerk, and janitor.

In 1978, after selling over 3 million books, Cosgrove sold Serendipity Press to Penguin/Putnam and began focusing on multimedia literature for children.

In 1990, Cosgrove and Wendy Edelson were awarded the Silver Jubilee Honor by the Pacific Northwest Booksellers Association (PNBA) for "Ira Woodworthy".

In 2002, Cosgrove created the websites Web-pop, Book-pop, and Chatty Hattie, where children can read stories online with colorful and interactive illustrations. Two years later, in 2004, he created the website BuggBooks, where children can have stories read to them by the author.

Currently, Cosgrove has written around 325 books, ranging from picture books for younger children to young adult novels.

== Famous series ==
- Serendipity series, illustrated by Robin Irene James
- ArkAngels series, illustrated by Diana Rice Bonin
- Barely There series, illustrated by Wendy Edelson
- Treasure Trolls series, illustrated by Diana Rice Bonin, inspired by the Troll dolls
